= Leipzig–Hof railway =

Railway line in Germany

Leipzig Bavarian station–Hof railway
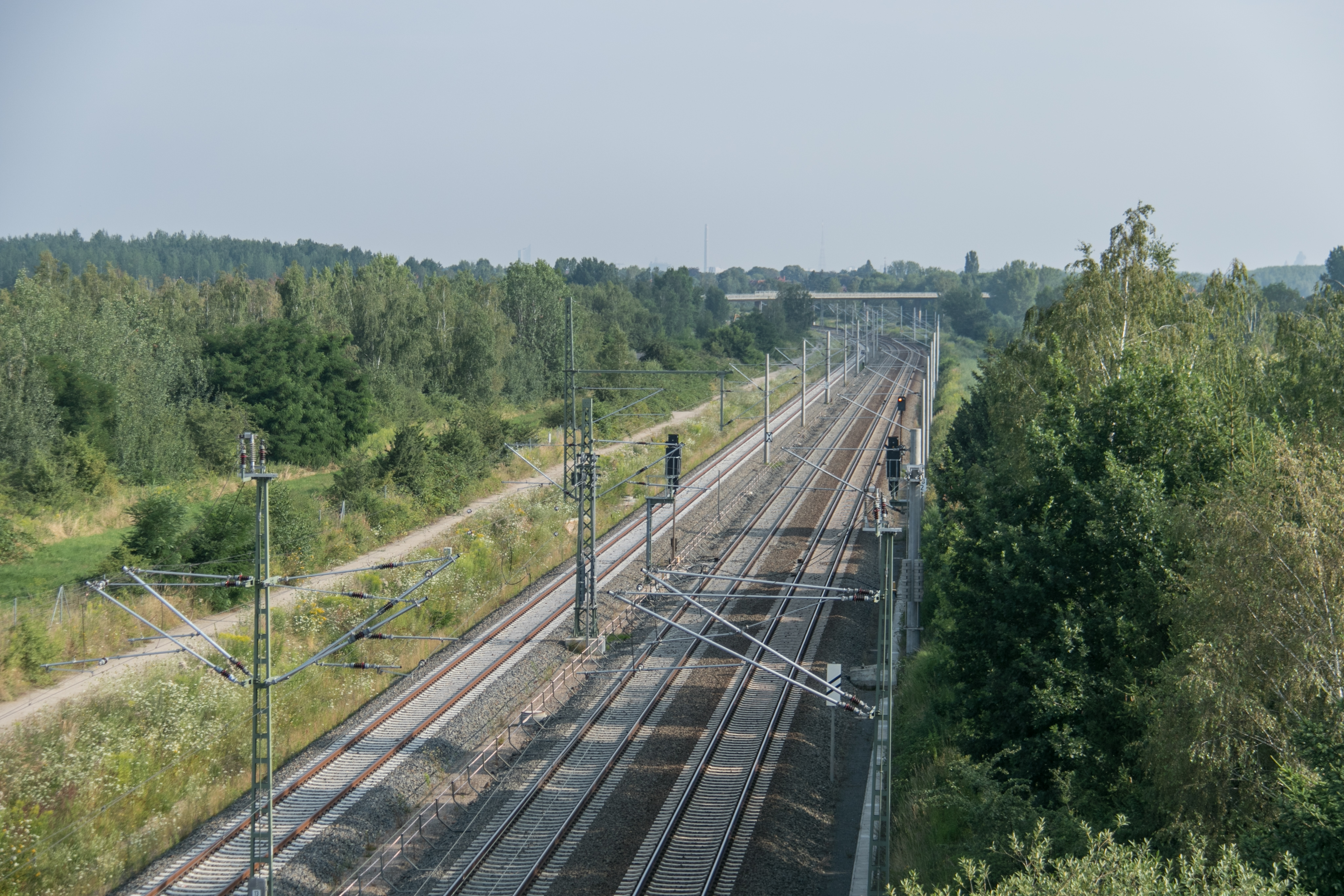

Overview
- Line number: 6362, 6377
- Locale: Saxony, Thuringia and Bavaria, Germany
- Termini: Leipzig Bayer Bf; Hof Hbf

Service
- Route number: 530

Technical
- Line length: 164.7 km (102.3 mi)
- Number of tracks: 2
- Track gauge: 1,435 mm (4 ft 8 1/2 in) standard gauge
- Minimum radius: 300 m (980 ft)
- Electrification: 15 kV/16.7 Hz AC catenary
- Operating speed: 160 km/h (99 mph) (maximum)
- Maximum incline: 1.0%

The Leipzig–Hof railway is a two-track main line in the German states of Saxony, Thuringia and Bavaria, originally built and operated by the Saxon-Bavarian Railway Company. It runs from Leipzig through Altenburg, the Werdau wye junction, Reichenbach and Plauen to Hof. The Werdau–Hof section is part of the Saxon-Franconian trunk line (Sachsen-Franken-Magistrale), the line connecting Dresden and Nuremberg. Its first section opened in 1842 and it is one of the oldest railways in Germany.

As a result of the division of Germany after the Second World War, the line lost considerable importance. Even after German reunification in 1989/90, the line has not been able to regain its former importance, especially as government policy gave preference to the extensive upgrade of the parallel Großheringen–Saalfeld railway. The remaining long-distance services ended In 2006.

== History ==
After its founding in 1835, the Leipzig–Dresden Railway Company (Leipzig-Dresdner Eisenbahn-Compagnie, LDE) received a concession to build a railway on the Leipzig–Hof route, but the company waived its right due to the difficulties that were to be expected. Thereupon a railway committee formed in Leipzig, and other cities such as Plauen, Altenburg and Bamberg also expressed interest in a railway connection. However, the financing as well as the technical feasibility were not yet assured. Investors wanted to wait to see if the LDE and its Leipzig–Dresden railway would succeed and the Saxon state gave the project little support; only surveys of route for the line were carried out 1837.

Railway construction was finally approved on 20 June 1840, but railway construction was to be undertaken by a private company with interest-free state loans. A treaty covering the route of the line and the Hof border station was signed between the three states of Saxony, Saxe-Altenburg and Bavaria on 14 January 1841. However, the final route also touched the territory of Reuss Elder Line and Reuss Junior Line. On 12 June 1841, the Sächsisch-Baierische Eisenbahn-Compagnie (Saxon-Bavarian Railway Company) was founded in Leipzig, which, according to the concession, had to finish one-third of the line within two years, and the rest within another four years.

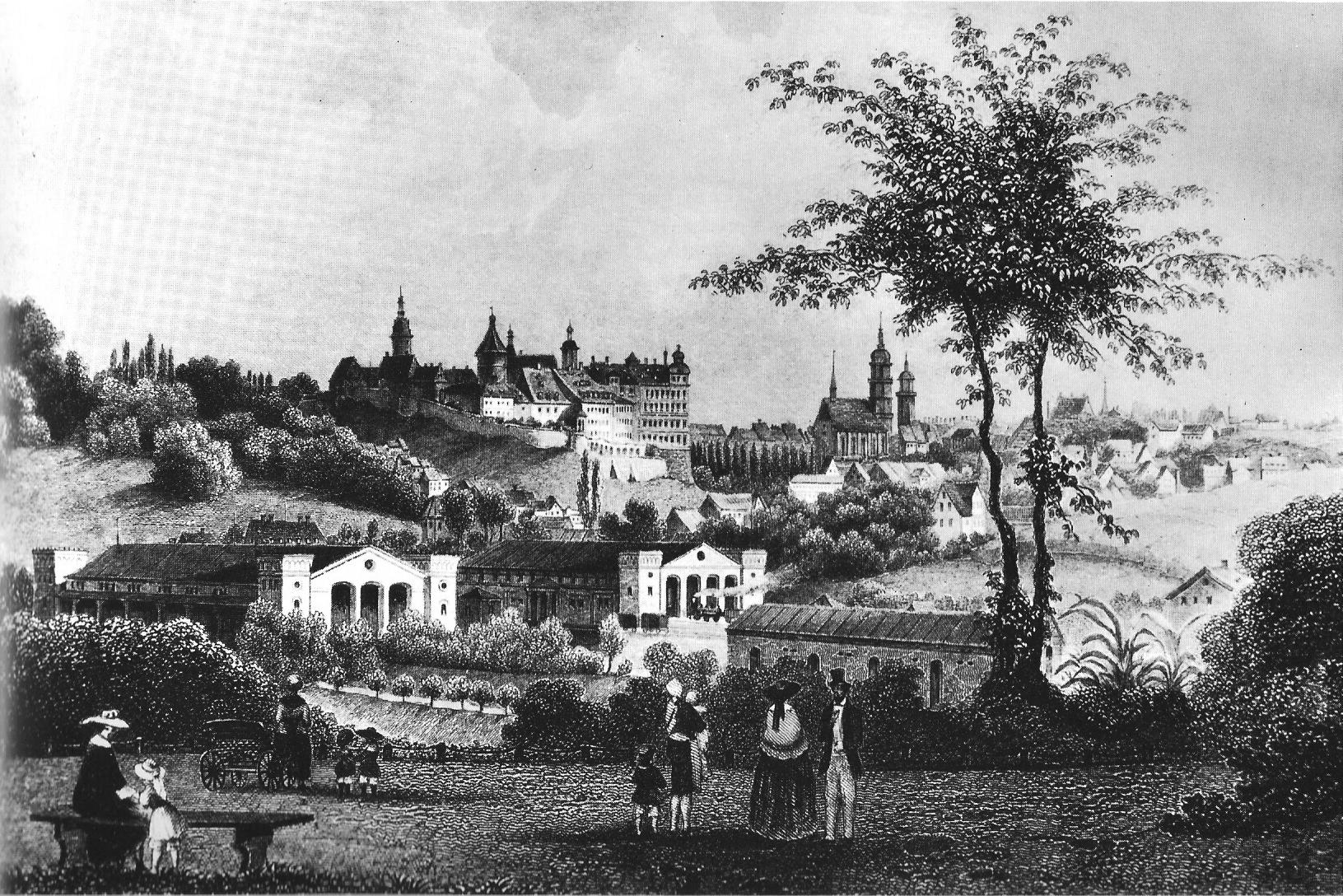
Altenburg station in about 1860

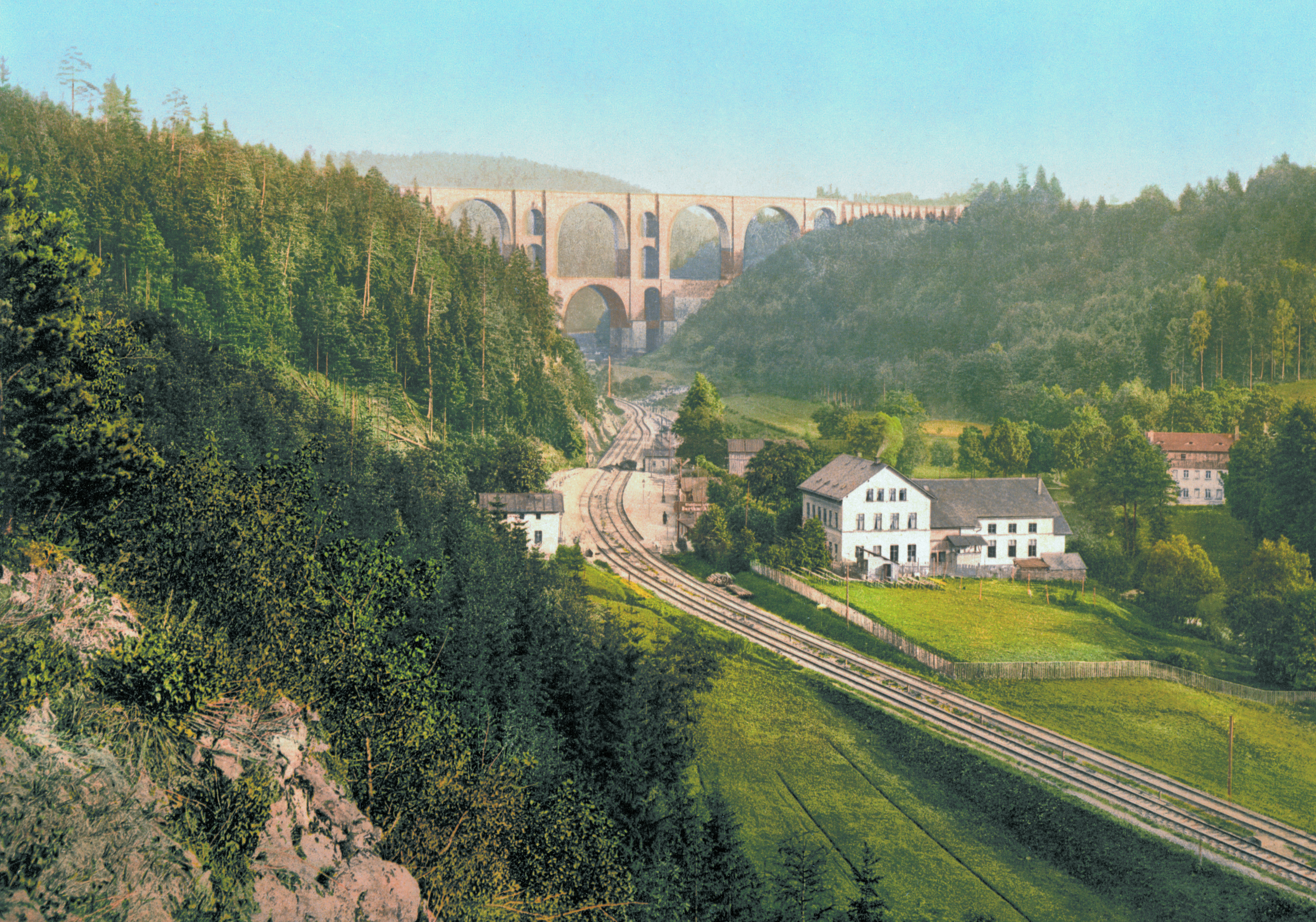
Elster Viaduct in about 1900

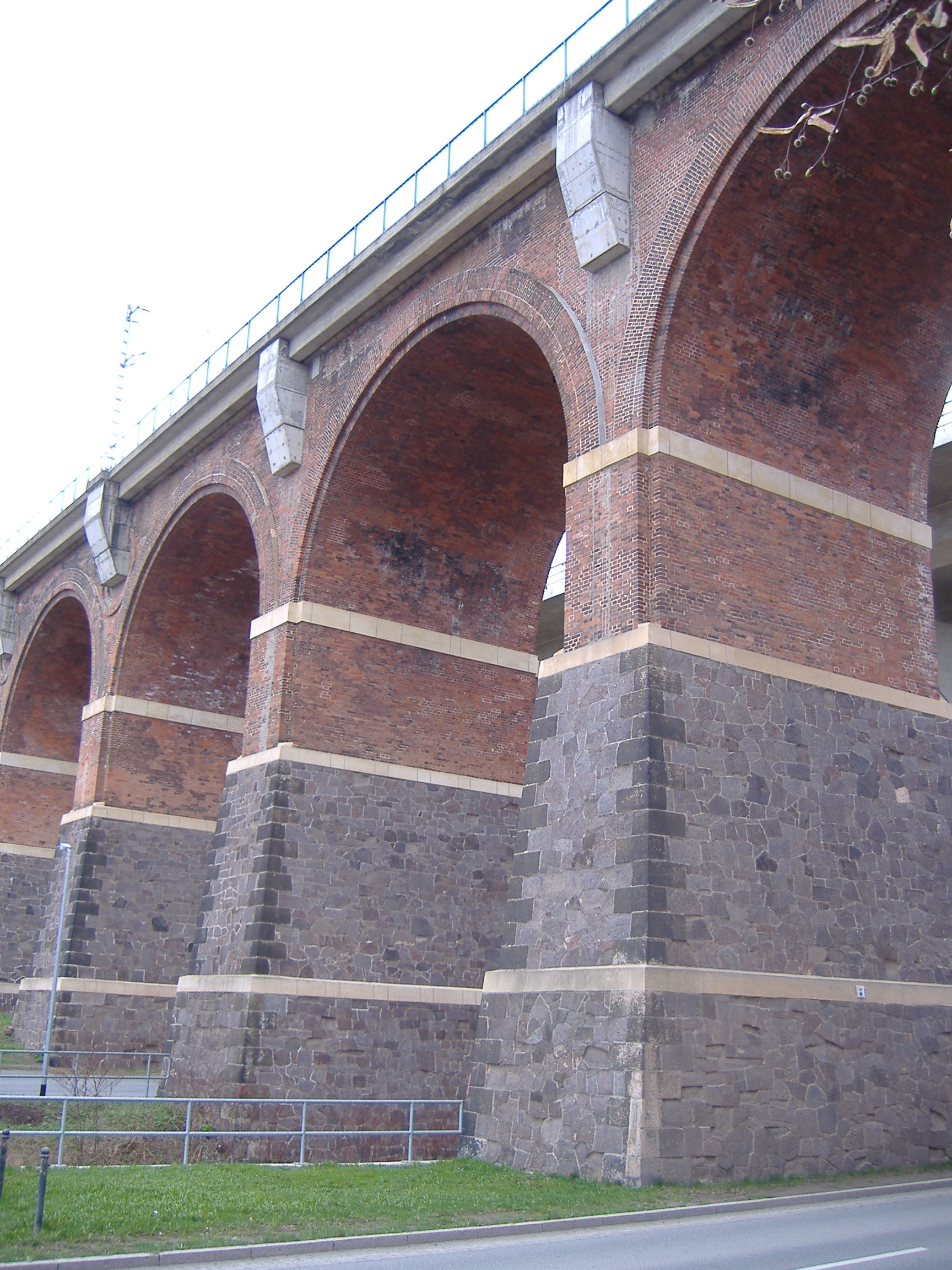
Leubnitz Viaduct, brick construction from 1845

Railway construction began on 1 July 1841 under the leadership of Karl Theodor Kunz, and initially work was carried out on the easily built section of the line from Leipzig to Reichenbach. The Leipzig–Altenburg section was already completed in 1842. Test runs took place on the section on 6 September 1842 and it was opened on 19 September of the same year. The Altenburg–Crimmitschau section was put into operation on 15 March 1844. A branch was also opened to the remote town of Zwickau. The Crimmitschau–Werdau and Werdau–Zwickau sections were inaugurated on 6 September 1845. With the opening of the Werdau–Reichenbach section on 31 May 1846, a connection was also opened to the Vogtland.

The building of the viaducts at Werdau had already caused financial difficulties for the company. Two large viaducts were needed to cross the Göltzsch or Elster valleys. Since no experience had been acquired in building such large bridges, the two viaducts were ultimately twice as expensive as originally planned. The double-line construction as well as the complicated route surveyed between Plauen and Hof cost more than had been planned. On 21 September 1846, the Saxon-Bavarian Railway Company had to cease financing the construction work and asked the Kingdom of Saxony for help. On 1 April 1847, the Kingdom of Saxony purchased the company and operated it as the Saxon-Bavarian State Railways (Sächsisch-Bayerische Staatseisenbahn).

The private railway company had begun construction work on the Plauen–Hof section to obtain further revenue to finance the expensive bridge structures as quickly as possible. This section was opened on 20 November 1848 and the state railways started operations on the last section from Reichenbach to Plauen on 15 July 1851.

=== Opening dates ===
- Leipzig–Altenburg: 19 September 1842
- Altenburg–Crimmitschau: 15 March 1844
- Crimmitschau–Werdau: 6 September 1845
- Werdau–Reichenbach: 31 May 1846
- Plauen–Hof: 20 November 1848
- Reichenbach–Plauen: 15 July 1851

=== Later history ===
The Neumark–Greiz line was opened in 1865; it was later extended to Neumark and connected to the Saxon-Bavarian railway. Trains on this line used the Neumark–Brunn section of the Leipzig–Hof line between 1865 and 1886. With increasing traffic, this section became congested, so from 1885 onwards a new track was laid parallel to the two existing ones and opened on the 19 May of the following year. It was nationalised in 1876 and it became part of the Saxon-Bavarian Railway. It was closed in 1999.

On 14 January 1867, a 6.8 km-long branch line was opened from Neukieritzsch to Borna. On 8 April 1872 this was extended by 55.7 km to become the direct Leipzig–Chemnitz line.

The inconvenient terminal station in Altenburg was converted into a through station between 1876 and 1878. This required a new alignment with a tunnel through a ridge south of the town.

On 1 September 1879, a 9.9 km-long branch line was opened from Gaschwitz (now in Markkleeberg) on the main line, running via Gautzsch (now Markkleeberg West) to the Plagwitz-Lindenau station of the Saxon State Railways on the southern outskirts of Leipzig.

The terminal station in Hof was replaced by a through station in 1880.

From 1888 to 1925, the Leipzig-Connewitz–Plagwitz railway branched off the Leipzig–Hof railway to the south of Connewitz station to connect the Leipzig Bavarian station with the Plagwitz-Lindenau station of the Saxon State Railways.

On 1 April 1920, the Royal Saxon State Railways was absorbed into the Deutsche Reichsbahn (DR). The Leipzig–Hof line was then administered by the Dresden railway division (Reichsbahndirektion Dresden).

Although the line was one of the most important railways in Germany, it was long spared from Allied air raids. Thus, although some stations in the southern section of the line became the target of air raids in 1944, in contrast to other routes, largely scheduled operations continued until 1945. It was only in April 1945 that the Elster Viaduct was partly blown up by the Wehrmacht, and the Saale viaduct (near Unterkotzau) was significantly damaged by air raids. Rail traffic came to a standstill and was resumed only after the end of the war.

After the Second World War, no trains initially operated across the line of demarcation between the Russian and the American occupation zones at Gutenfürst. All the trains terminated in Gutenfürst and Feilitzsch. Interzonal freight traffic recommenced in 1946, passenger services only recommenced in 1947.

The Altenburg tunnel had to be converted into a cutting in the run-up to the electrification in 1958/59 because its roof was too low for the installation of overhead wire and because its damaged roof allowed surface water to penetrate.

Electrification was completed on the line from Leipzig Hauptbahnhof and Leipzig Bavarian station to Böhlen on 2 October 1961. Several more sections of electrification were opened, finally reaching Reichenbach on 20 December 1963.

The only local service between Hof and Feilitzsch was discontinued in 1972. On 30 October 1972 there was a serious railway accident in Schweinsburg-Culten when two express trains collided and 28 people died.

In the 1990s, the Planungsgesellschaft Bahnbau Deutsche Einheit ("planning corporation for German unity railway construction") developed plans for an upgrade of the railway lines between Leipzig and Zwickau, which had not been implemented by 2011.

The renovation of the Altenburg–Paditz section, which is about four kilometers long, was completed on 25 November 2013 after more than two years of construction; this work included the restoration of operations on two tracks. Since the summer of 2011, around €36 m have been invested and at the same time about 8 kilometres of track have been renewed; 11 kilometres were fully reconstructed and four railway overpasses and one road overpass as well as two culverts were built. In the area of the former Altenburg tunnel, about 1000 metres of support wall and 500 metres of trough construction were built. In the future trains in this section will be able to operate at up to 150 km/h.

=== Unimplemented upgrade between Plauen and Hof ===
The line between Plauen and Hof is almost twice as long as the straight line distance, which is around 26 kilometres, considerably increasing travel time. There have been plans for a new line between Plauen and Hof since 1874. All proposals have assumed that the new line would start at Weischlitz on the Plauen–Cheb railway. The route would then have run via Wiedersberg and reconnected with the existing line at Hof. From 1884 onwards the community of Plauen sent a petition to the Saxon Landtag (parliament) every year, but the request was not implemented.

A second serious attempt to promote a shortening of the route was made in 1913 and a third was made at the end of the 1930s. Preliminary work actually began, but it was stopped in favour of other projects with more military significance. The Werdau wye–Plauen section would have been upgraded to four tracks at the same time; the new section would have begun at Weischlitz and tunnelled under the heights of the Vogtland. The new line would have re-entered the existing railway network in Feilitzsch.

At the beginning of the 1990s, there were again discussions on the construction of a new route between Weischlitz on the Plauen–Cheb railway and Feilitzsch, which would have shortened the Plauen–Hof section from 49 to no more than 32 kilometres. Because of the high costs and the routing of interregional long-distance traffic between Berlin and Munich via the Großheringen–Saalfeld railway, the projection has not been implemented.

=== Integration of the Leipzig City Tunnel ===
In the course of the construction of the Leipzig City Tunnel, work was carried out on the Leipzig–Hof to integrate in the network. This work enabled the City-Tunnel to be integrated into the existing network, as part of the creation of the new S-Bahn Mitteldeutschland network.

Since the end of 2011, the S-Bahn line has been moved from the east side (route 6362) to the west side (route 6377) of Leipzig as a result of this work. Markkleeberg Nord station was rebuilt and Leipzig-Connewitz, Markkleeberg and Markkleeberg-Großstädteln stations were adapted. Several bridges were replaced and the track infrastructure were rebuilt with new overhead, turnouts and noise barriers. One track of line 6362 between Connewitz and Gaschwitz was dismantled to make space for the Markkleeberg Nord platform.

Gaschwitz station was renamed Markkleeberg-Gaschwitz with the start-up of the new S-Bahn network.

=== Electrification between Reichenbach and Hof ===
The electrification of the roughly 73 km-long section between Reichenbach and Hof made it possible to run electric trains between Leipzig and Dresden and Hof. This made the integration of Plauen and Hof into the electrically operated S-Bahn Mitteldeutschland possible.

Construction of the electrification started on 21 July 2010. The Reichenbach–Herlasgrün section was completed in December 2011. In addition to this, extensive work had to be carried out on the Göltzsch Viaduct and several road bridges with too little clearance for electrification were replaced.

The electrification of the Herlasgrün–Plauen section took place between February and December 2012. This included the renewal of three road overbridges.

A frequency changer was set up in Hof for the production of railway power. The power between Plauen (Vogtland) and Hof was connected on 9 November 2013 and regular electric train services commenced to Hof on 15 December 2013. Restoration and other residual work were expected to continue until 2014. The cost of the whole works was expected to be around €120 million. RE 3 Regional-Express services have been operated between Dresden and Hof since then using double-deck carriages and electric haulage.

The Leipzig Bayerischer Bahnhof–Werdau wye section has been served by services on lines S5 and S5X of the S-Bahn Mitteldeutschland since 15 December 2013. Line S3 services also run from Leipzig Bayerischer Bahnhof to Neukieritzsch and line S2 services also run to Markkleeberg-Gaschwitz. The services on lines S1 and S4 running towards Leipzig-Stötteritz use the short section between Leipzig Bayerischer Bahnhof and Leipzig MDR.

== Route ==
The route starts at the Bayerischen Bahnhof (Bavarian station) in Leipzig, where it connects to the City Tunnel. At Leipzig-Connewitz station, it connects with the former Verbindungsbahn ("connecting line") from Leipzig Hbf, over which all traffic ran until November 2012 and the Leipzig freight ring (Leipziger Güterring). Since the closure of the connecting line, the Leipzig–Hof line is no longer directly accessible from Leipzig Hbf.

The line then runs through southern Leipzig, which is dominated by coal mining and mining landscapes composed of lakes in abandoned open cuts and slag heaps. There are four tracks as far as Gaschwitz and then three tracks to Böhlen. In Altenburg, the landscape becomes hilly and the line then follows the valley of the Pleiße. In Gößnitz the line intersects with the Mid-Germany connection and then passes through Crimmitschau and Werdau before reaching the Werdau wye, where it connects with the line from Dresden to Werdau. It then enters northern Vogtland. Two kilometres west of Neumark the line to Greiz branched off until it was closed in 1999. Electrification of the line currently ends at Reichenbach, where a section with interesting structures begins, including the Göltzsch Viaduct at Netzschkau and the Elster Viaduct at Jocketa.

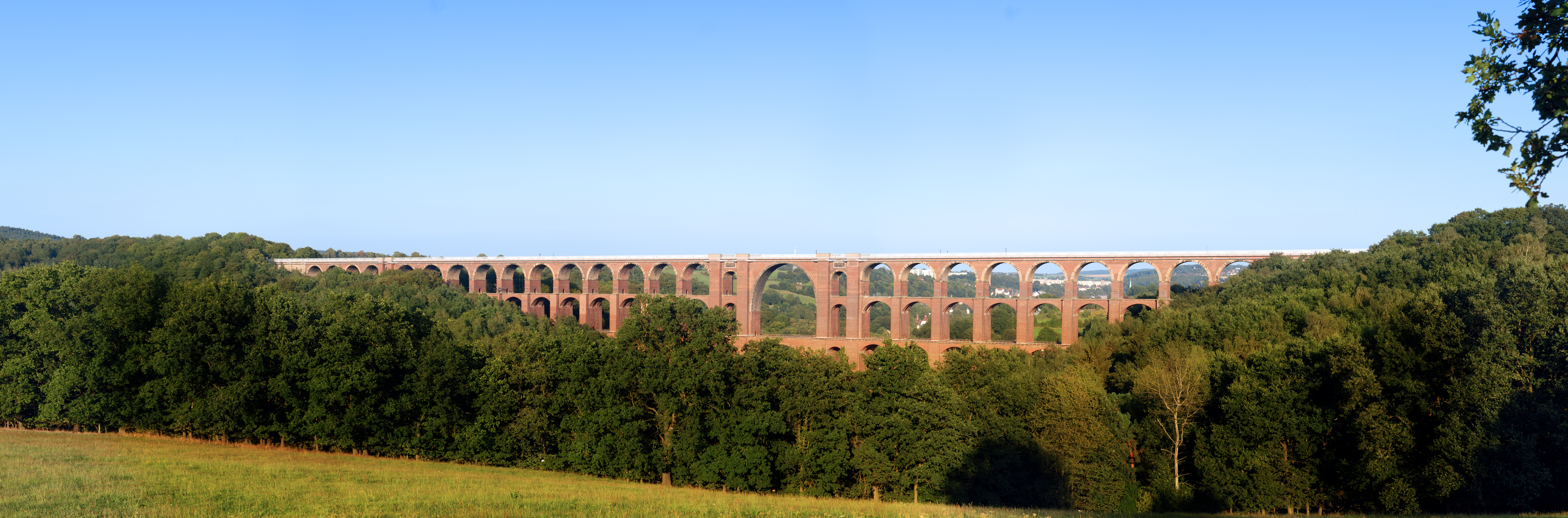
Göltzsch Viaduct

The route then reaches Plauen, which has seven stations, but trains on the Saxon-Bavarian Railway only stop at Plauen upper station and Jößnitz. After Plauen station, the line turns back to the north, while the line to Bad Bramstedt and Cheb turns off to the south. After Syrau the line turns back to the west and in Mehltheuer it connects with the line from Gera. At Schönberg after connecting with the line to Schleiz and the closed line to Hirschberg, it turns south and runs over three very short sections that cross Thuringian territory. The last station in Saxony is the former border station of Gutenfürst, where only three main tracks remain. At the 151.699 km mark (from the Leipzig Bavarian station) the line leaves Saxony.

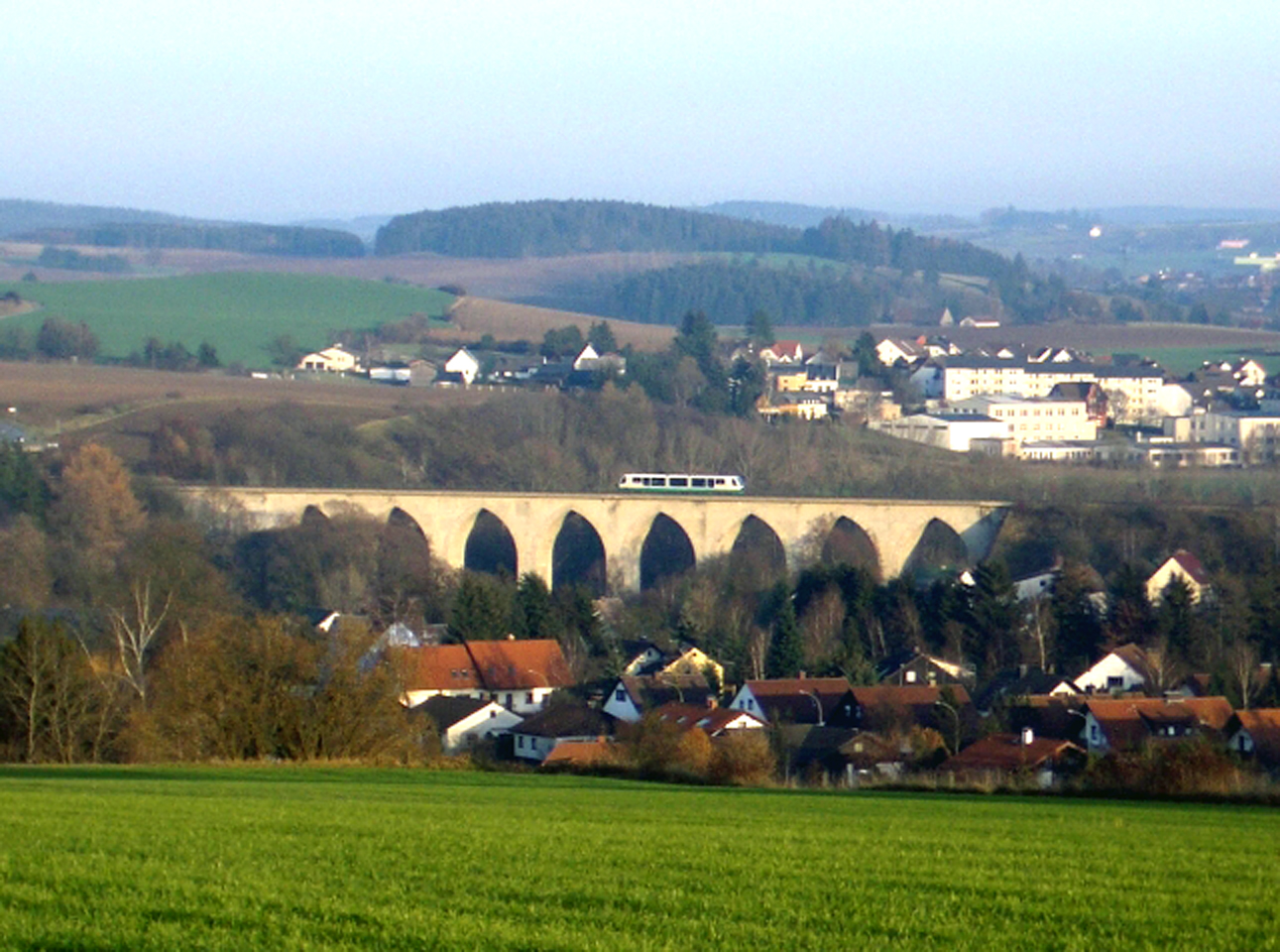
Unterkotzau bridge near Hof

In Bavaria the line crosses the A72 autobahn and passes through the village of Feilitzsch. The station was closed in June 1973, but re-opened on 15 September 2006; it is only served by the Vogtlandbahn and the Erfurter Bahn on request. Hof Hauptbahnhof is reached at kilometre 164.7.

=== Stations ===
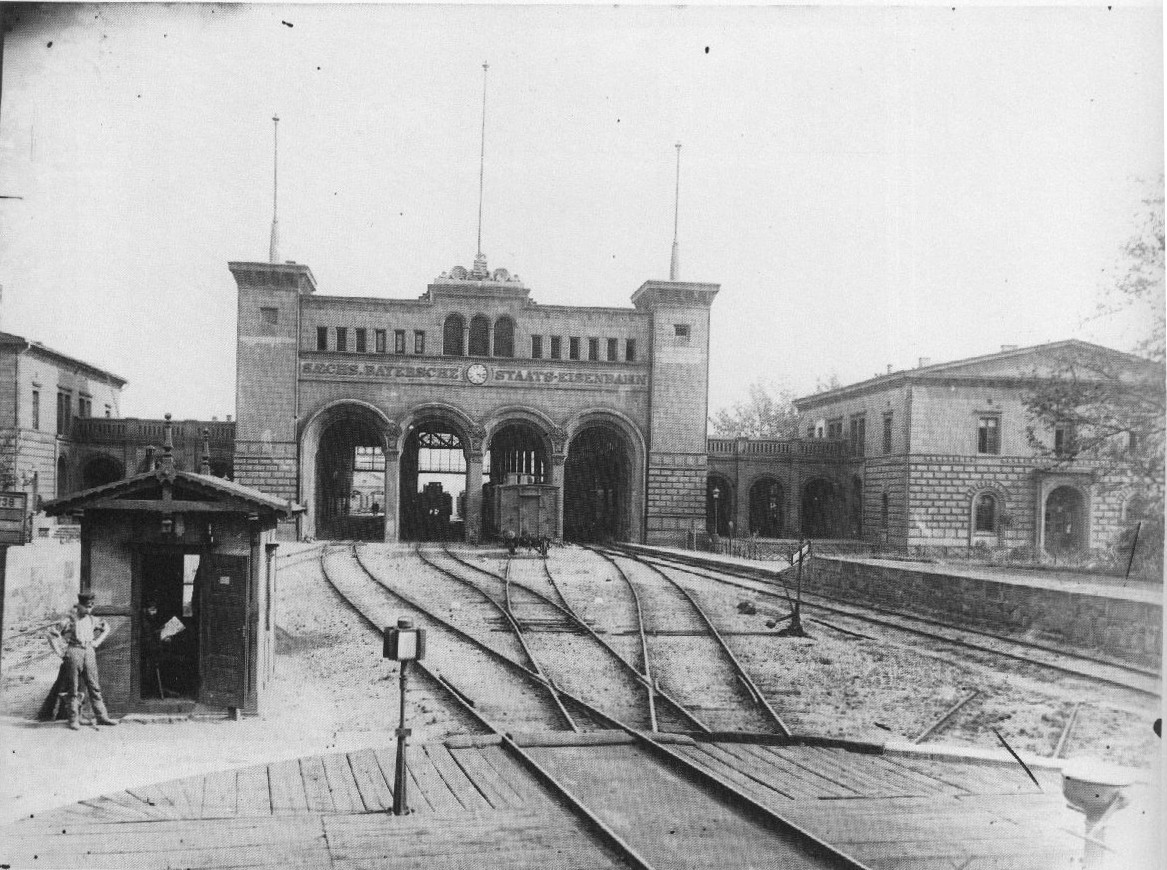
North side of the Bayerischer Bahnhof, about 1900

Leipzig Bayer Bf (51°19′38″N 12°22′57″E)

The station was built to the plans of Eduard Pötzsch. Although the section of the line to Altenburg was commissioned in 1842, the station was not completed to 1844. In the following decades the station was expanded several times to cope with the strongly growing traffic. With the opening of Leipzig Hauptbahnhof, the station lost considerable importance since all long-distance traffic was now handled at the main station.

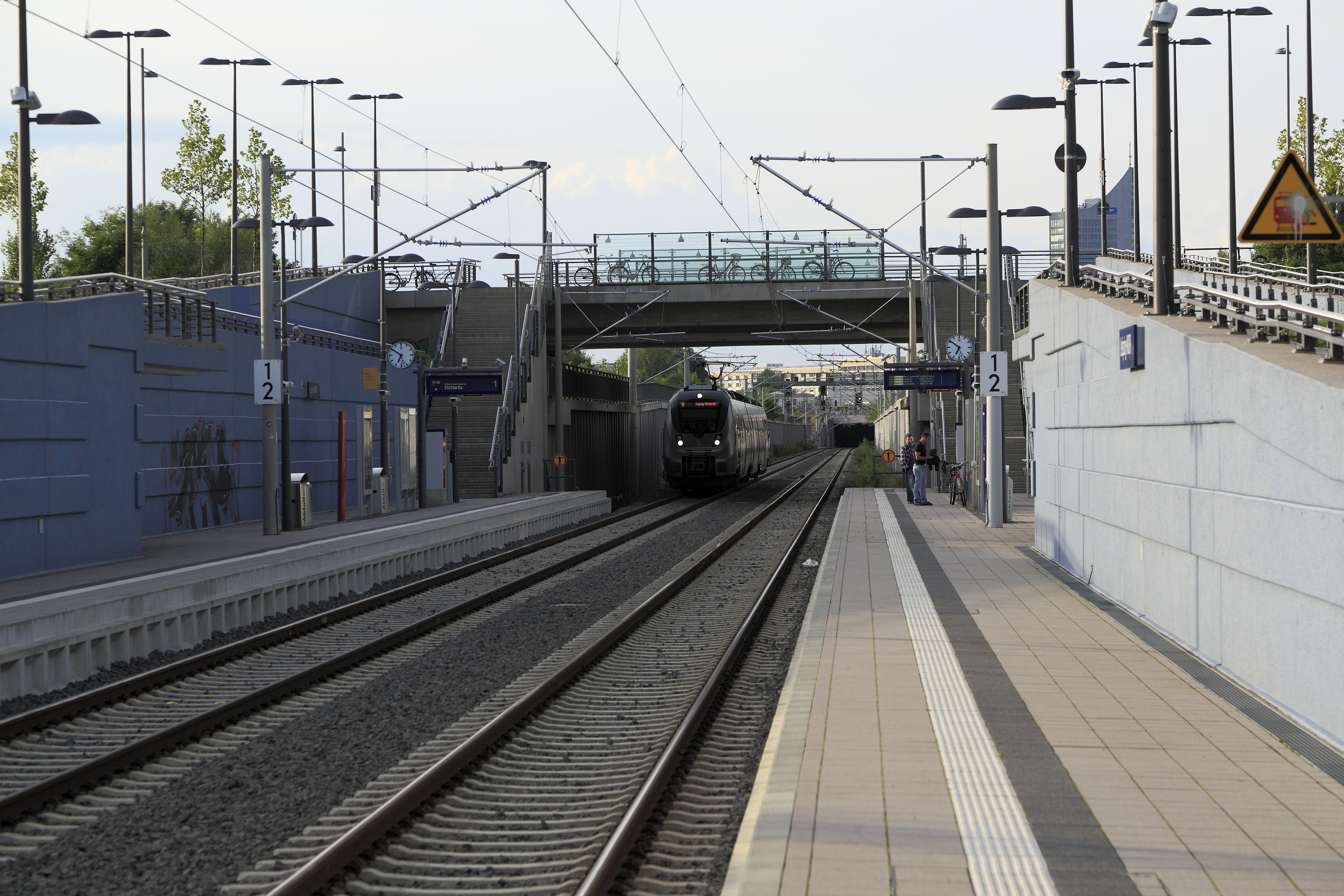
Leipzig MDR, the tunnel ramp towards Leipzig Bayer Bf is behind (2014)

Leipzig MDR (51°19′12″N 12°23′11″E)

The above-ground Leipzig MDR station, which opened on 15 December 2013, is outside the Leipzig City Tunnel, but still in the cutting leading to its southern ramp. It is part of the southern connection from the city tunnel to the existing network. Its planning name was Semmelweisstraße. Two 140 metre-long side platforms were built, which are located directly south of Semmelweisstraße, a street that was recently built to connect Kurt-Eisner-Strasse with Zwickauer Straße. Access to the platforms is by stairs and ramps.

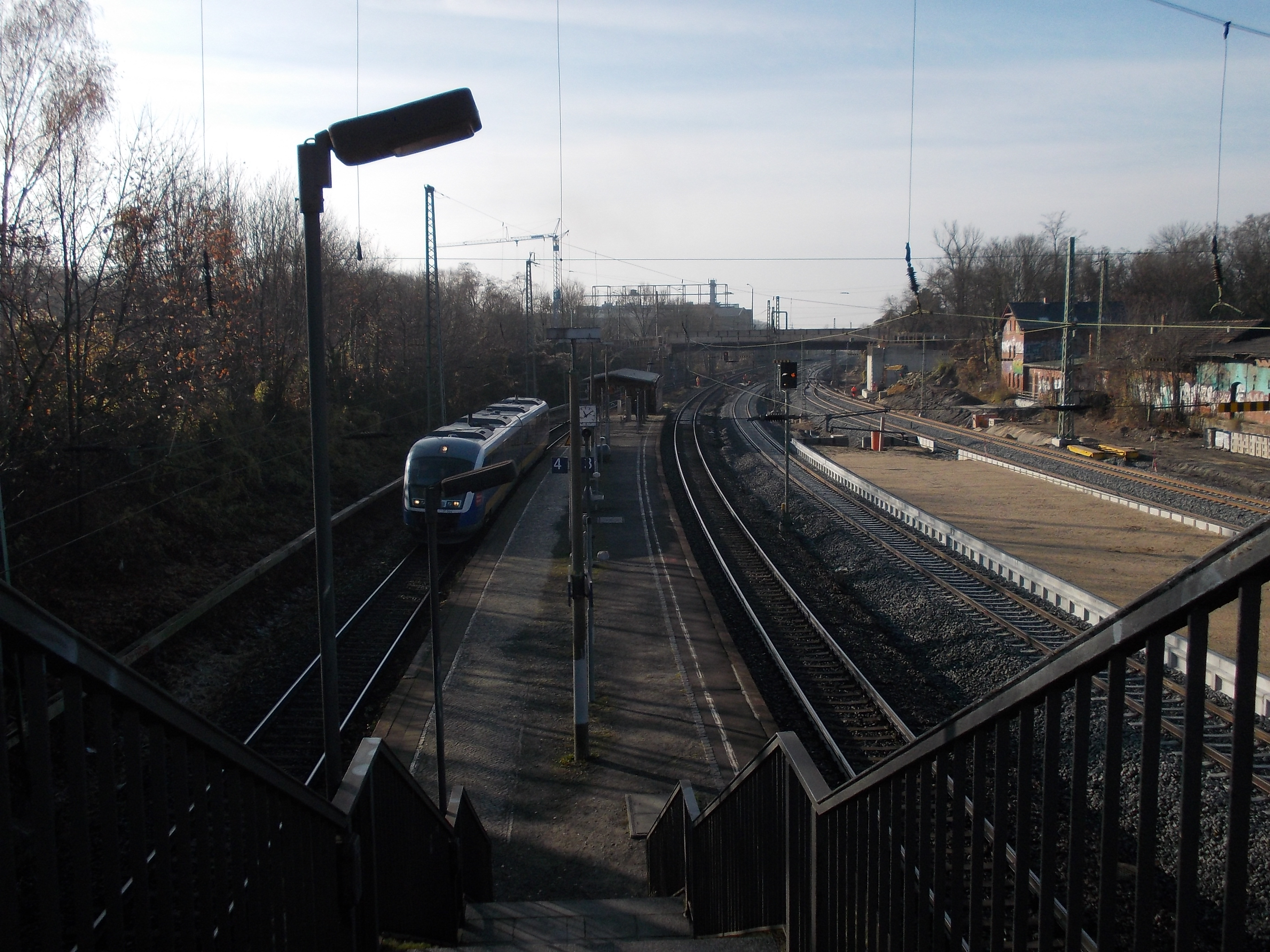
Leipzig-Connewitz station 2012 during the construction of the City Tunnel

Leipzig-Connewitz (51°18′01″N 12°23′09″E)

Leipzig-Connewitz station opened on 10 July 1889 as Connewitz loading point (Ladestelle). The connection from Connewitz to Leipzig was opened in 1891. The station was opened on 1 November 1893 as a halt (Haltestelle) and renamed Leipzig-Connewitz in 1897. The halt was reclassified as a station in 1905.

The station is a railway junction in southern Leipzig. Between 1888 and 1925, the Leipzig-Connewitz–Plagwitz railway connected the industrial area of Plagwitz to the Saxon State Railways network. Between 1876 and 2012, the Leipzig Hbf–Leipzig-Connewitz railway (known as the Zweite Verbindungsbahn—"second connecting railway") ran from Leipzig Hauptbahnhof (called Leipzig-Dresdener Bahnhof until 1915). The section of the Engelsdorf–Leipzig-Connewitz railway (which was opened in 1906) between the former Tabakmühle junction and Leipzig-Connewitz was closed in 2012 and dismantled with the opening of the S-Bahn Mitteldeutschland in 2013. Leipzig-Connewitz was the starting point of the Leipzig–Hof line during the reconstruction of the line to connect with the new City Tunnel. The remaining part of the Leipzig Hbf–Leipzig-Connewitz route from Stötteritz runs past the station. The S-Bahn trains run between Connewitz and Gaschwitz over the suburban tracks, line number 6377. There are platforms on the suburban tracks only, which were built on the location of the former long-distance tracks and opened in 2013.

Markkleeberg-Nord (51°17′17″N 12°22′20″E)

Markkleeberg-Nord halt was opened with the commissioning of the S-Bahn Mitteldeutschland on 15 December 2013. It is served by lines S2, S3, S5 and S5X. It is located on the suburban tracks, line number 6377, and because of the space needed for the platform, the main line between Leipzig-Connewitz and Gaschwitz has been reduced to one track since 2013.

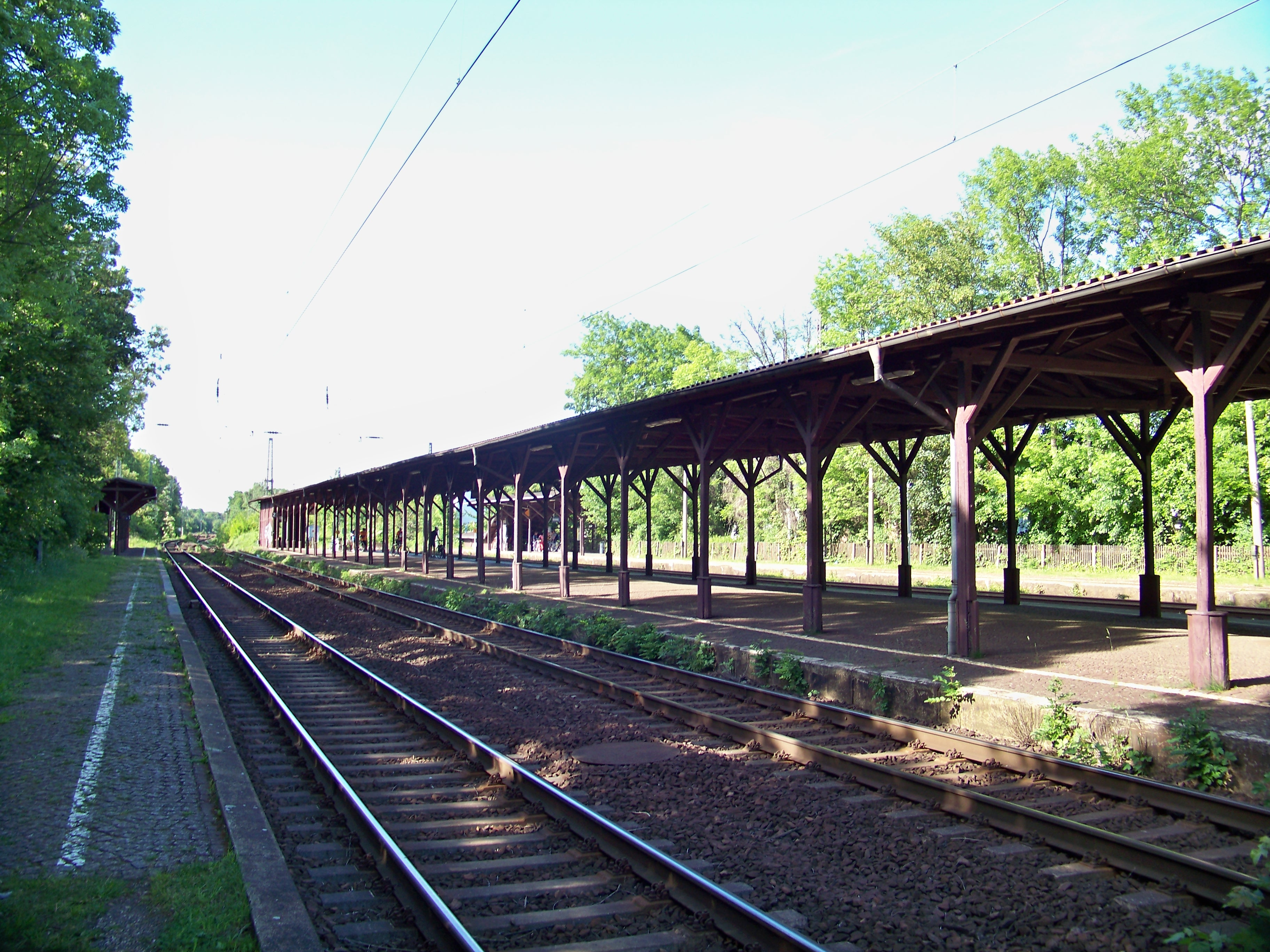
Markkleeberg halt in 2009 before the reconstruction works; the suburban tracks are in the foreground

Markkleeberg (51°16′45″N 12°22′21″E)

Markkleeberg halt was opened on 1 July 1889 under the name of Oetzsch. It has had the following names:

- until 1905: Oetzsch
- until 1924: Ötzsch
- until 1934: Oetzsch
- since 1934: Markkleeberg

After Oetzsch and Markkleeberg had united to form Oetzsch-Markkleeberg in 1915, the station retained the name of Oetzsch. It was only with the incorporation of the new town of Markkleeberg that it was renamed to Markkleeberg. In 1969, the station was integrated in the Leipzig S-Bahn network, which since 2013 has formed part of the S-Bahn Mitteldeutschland. The halt is served by lines S2, S3, S5 and S5X. Since 2013, there have been no platforms on the main line.

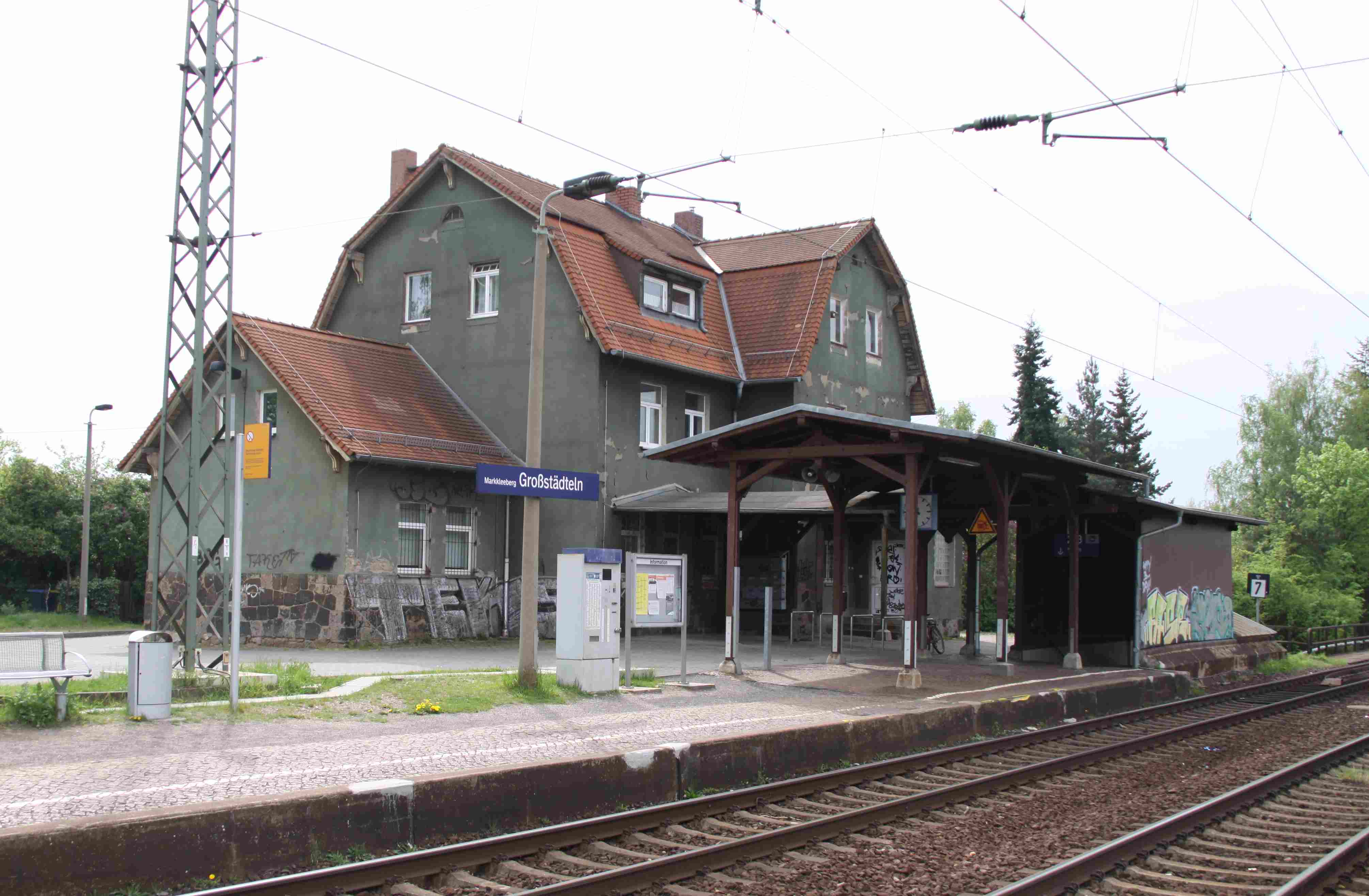
Entrance building of Markkleeberg-Großstädteln station with the main line tracks in front. 2010, before the start of the construction work for the City Tunnel

Markkleeberg-Großstädteln (51°15′45″N 12°22′34″E)

Großstädteln halt was opened on 1 November 1907. With the integration of Großstädteln into the municipality of Markkleeberg on 1 November 1937, it was renamed Markkleeberg-Großstädteln. From 1879 to the cessation of passenger traffic in 2002, Großstädteln was also a stop on the Leipzig-Plagwitz–Markkleeberg-Gaschwitz railway. The halt has been served since 15 December 2013 by the S-Bahn Mitteldeutschland (lines S2, S3, S5 and S5X).

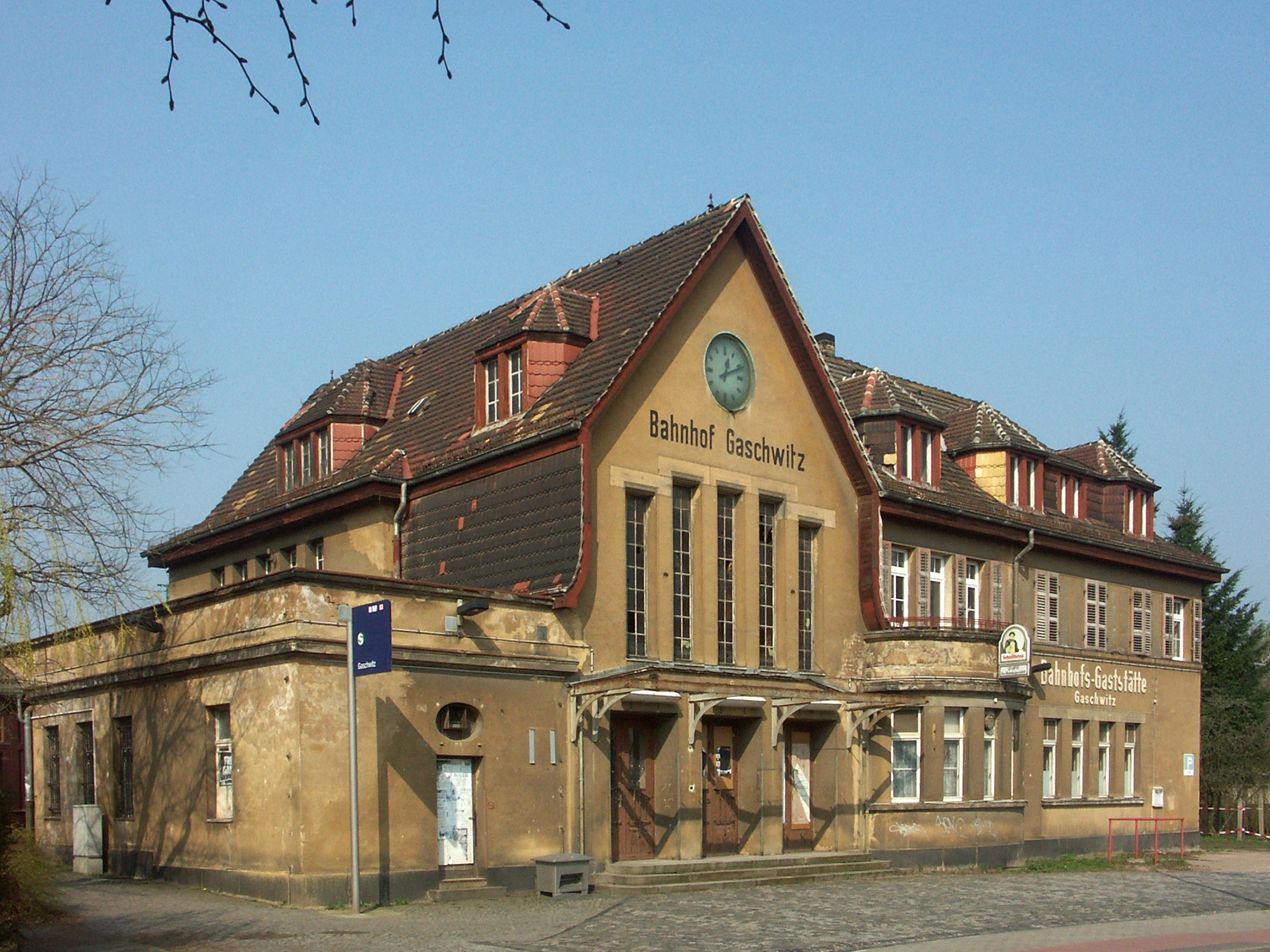
Gaschwitz station building (2009)

Markkleeberg-Gaschwitz (51°15′00″N 12°22′44″E)

Gaschwitz halt was opened on the Leipzig–Hof railway on 19 September 1842. The station was expanded into a major marshalling yard for freight transport in 1870. Subsequently, the station became an important point for changing trains in the south of Leipzig. The Gaschwitz–Meuselwitz railway opened to Zwenkau in 1874 and the Leipzig-Plagwitz–Markkleeberg-Gaschwitz railway in 1879. The Leipzig S-Bahn network was opened in 1969; trains on the heart-shaped line A reversed in Gaschwitz.

The railway connection to Zwenkau was shut down and dismantled in 1957 because of the advance of open-cast mining in Zwenkau. Since 2002, the line to Leipzig-Plagwitz has only been used as an occasional diversion route for freight or regional traffic. Two of the original six platforms at Gaschwitz station are still in operation. These have been served since 15 December 2013 at half-hour intervals in both directions by services on line S3 of the S-Bahn Mitteldeutschland between Halle and Geithain. At the same time, the station was renamed Markkleeberg-Gaschwitz. Bundesautobahn 38 crosses the line over a bridge in the area of the station. The separate suburban tracks (line 6377) end at the southern end of Gaschwitz station and from there to Böhlen there is an additional freight track (line 6378) next to the tracks of the main line.

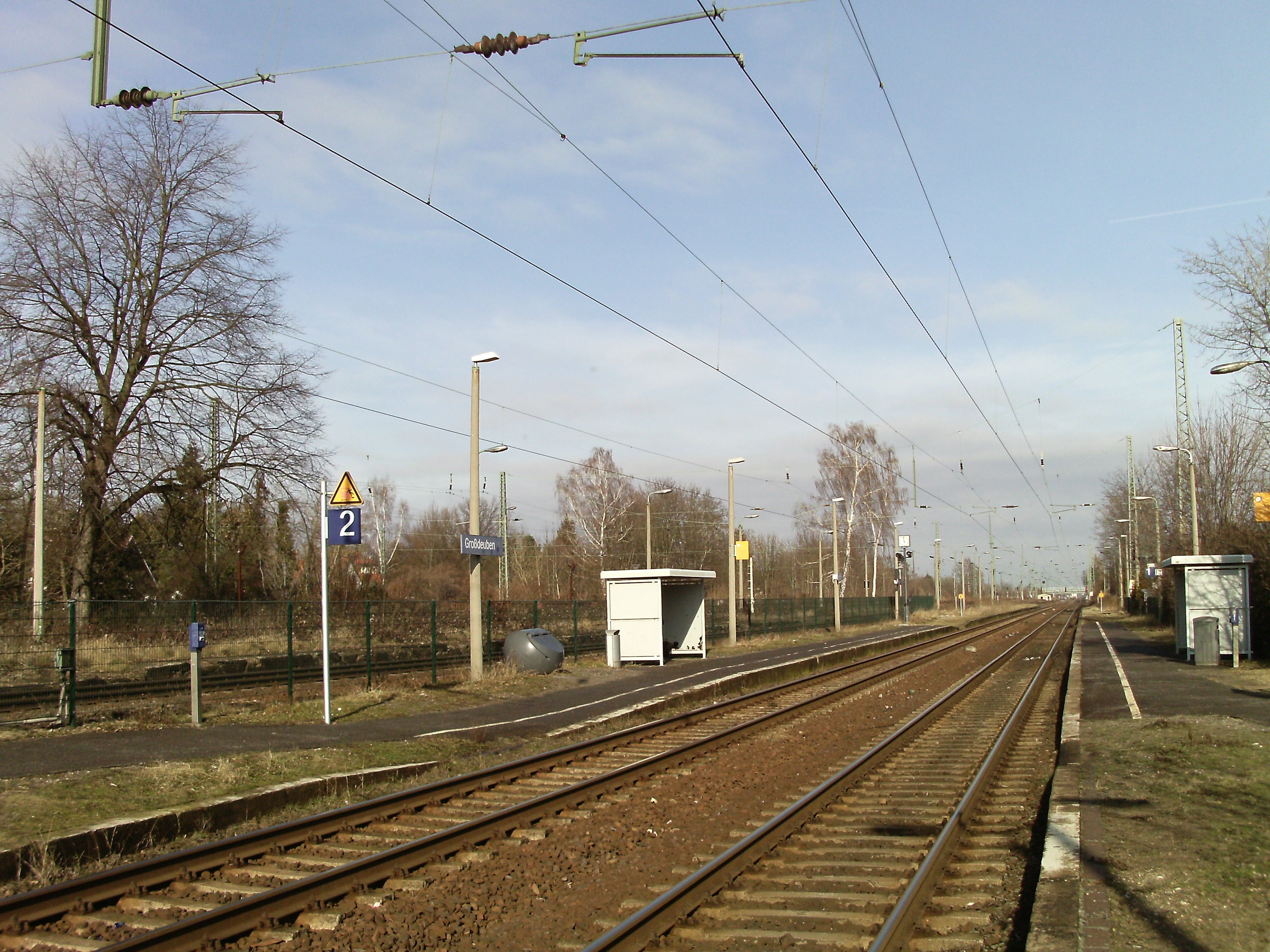
Großdeuben station

Großdeuben (51°13′56″N 12°22′59″E)

Großdeuben was opened on 1 October 1904 under the name of Probstdeuben. After Probstdeuben was integrated into Großdeuben in 1934, the station was renamed Großdeuben. The station is in the south of the village. In the area of Großdeuben, the railway is located on a 500-metre-wide corridor with the Böhlen/Zwenkau open-cast lignite mine (1921–1998) to the west and the Pleiße, federal highway 2 and the Tagebaus Espenhain open-cast lignite mine (1940–1992) to the east.

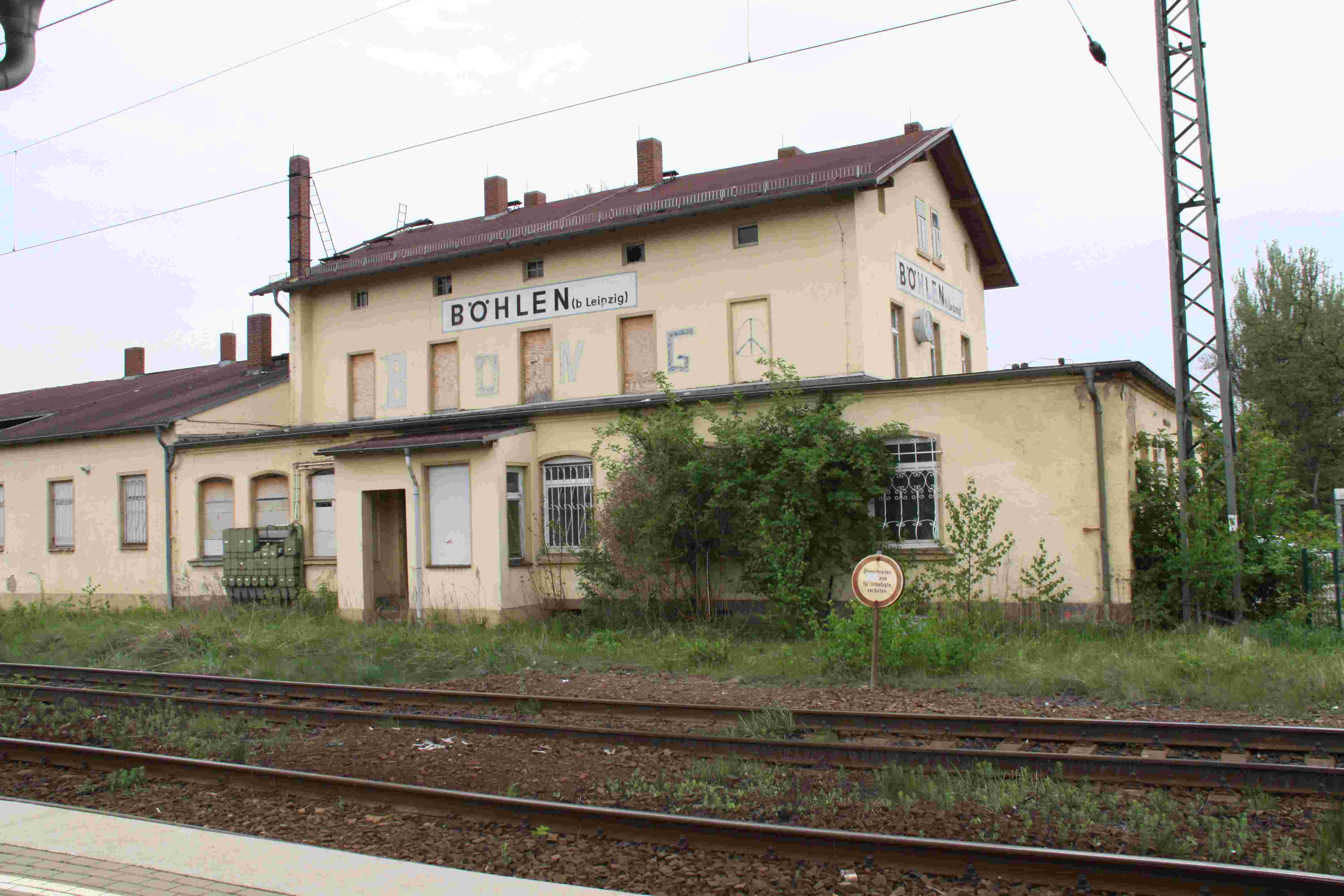
Böhlen (b Leipzig) station building, track side

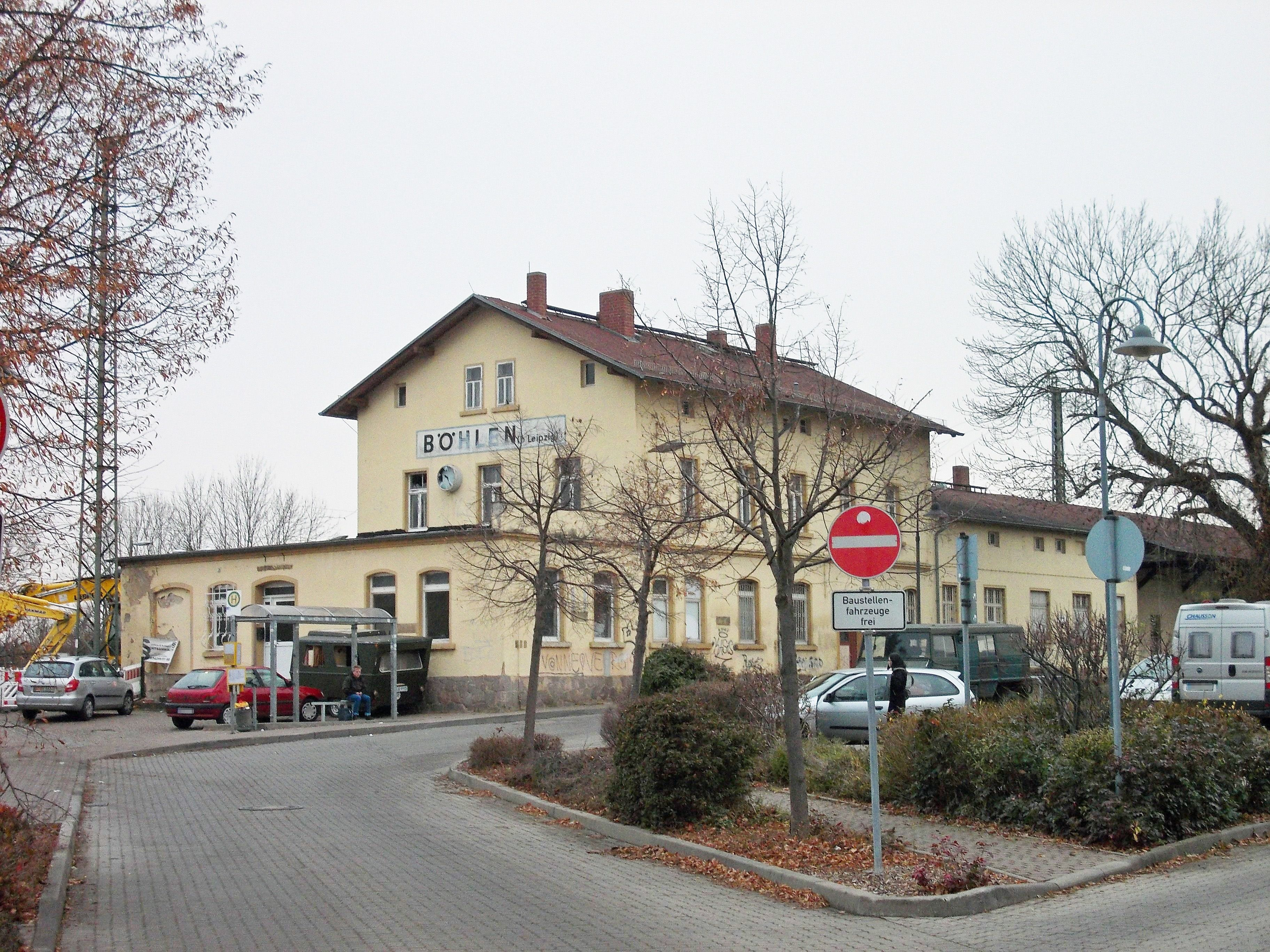
Street side

Böhlen (b Leipzig) (51°12′13″N 12°22′56″E) Böhlen halt was opened on 19 September 1842 passengers and goods. It has had the following names:

- until 1886: Böhlen
- until 1911: Böhlen (Rötha)
- until 1913: Böhlen-Rötha
- until 1918: Böhlen b Rötha
- until 1933: Böhlen b Leipzig
- since 1933: Böhlen (b Leipzig)

The first station building dates from 1858. A new station building and a goods shed were built in 1878/79. The tunnel for passenger traffic was completed in 1911. A new station building and a goods shed were built in 1878/79. The station was upgraded in 1888/96. The passenger subway was completed In 1911. Since 1913, Böhlen (b Leipzig) station has been the starting point of the Böhlen–Espenhain railway, which has only been used for freight traffic since 1993. Since Rötha had its own station on the new line, the station in Böhlen was renamed Böhlen b Rötha (Böhlen near Rötha) in 1918.

The station is located in the west of Böhlen. It has been served since 15 December 2013 by the S-Bahn Mitteldeutschland (lines S3, S5 and S5X). Between 1921 and 1950, the area west of the railway line was dug up by the Böhlen opencast mine.

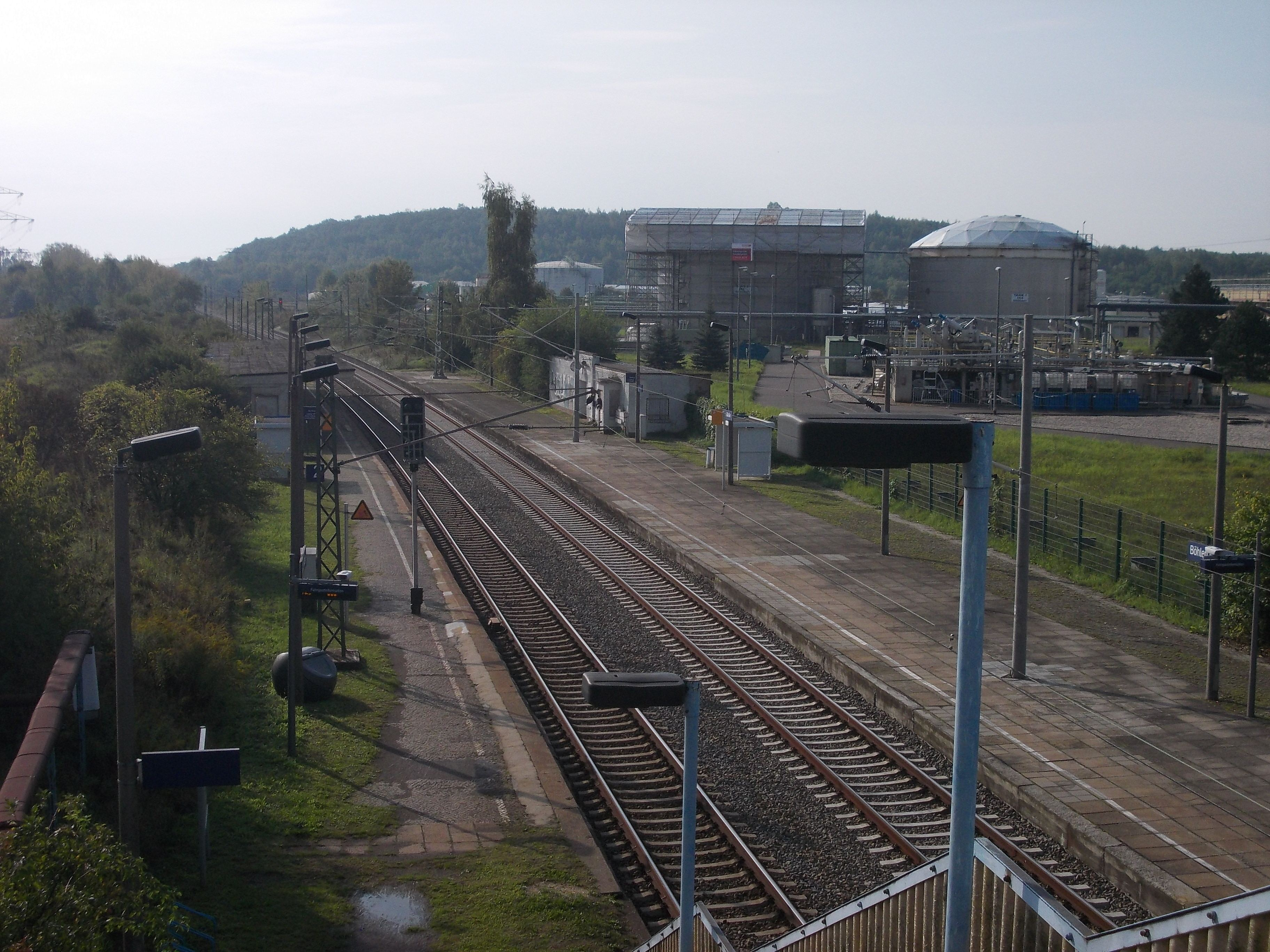
Böhlen Werke station

Böhlen Werke (51°11′05″N 12°23′02″E)

Böhlen Werke (works) halt was opened in October 1948. There has been an entrance building since 1954. Located in the vicinity of the station are, among others, the Chemiewerke Böhlen (Böhlen chemical works) and the Lippendorf Power Station. West of the station is the industrial area of Böhlen-Lippendorf. The station has been served by the S-Bahn Mitteldeutschland (lines S3 and S5) since 15 December 2013.

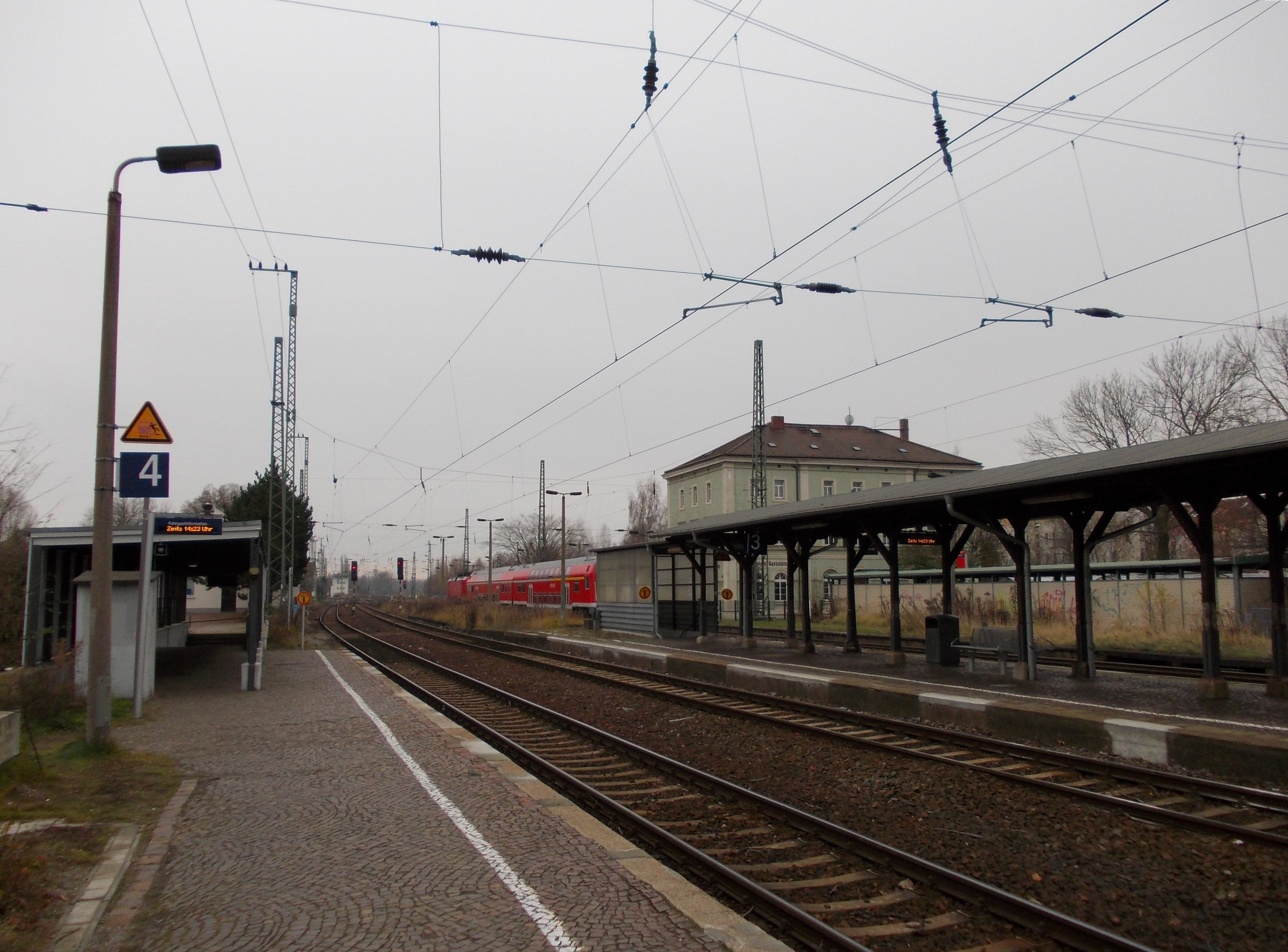
Neukieritzsch station

Neukieritzsch (51°09′02″N 12°24′46″E)

Neukieritzsch station (until 3 October 1936 it was called Kieritzsch) was opened in 1842 with the Leipzig–Altenburg section; the first tracks had reached it in 1841. In the immediate vicinity a separate railway settlement developed (called Neukieritzsch, meaning "new" Kieritzsch) as the village of Kieritzsch was about three kilometres away. While the station was in the vicinity of Kahnsdorf and Pürsten, both villages rejected the use of the name of their municipalities. From its opening, there were repair facilities in Kieritzsch station, with the opening of the lines to Borna (1867, extended to Chemnitz in 1872) and to Pegau (1909), the station developed into a small railway junction in the following decades.

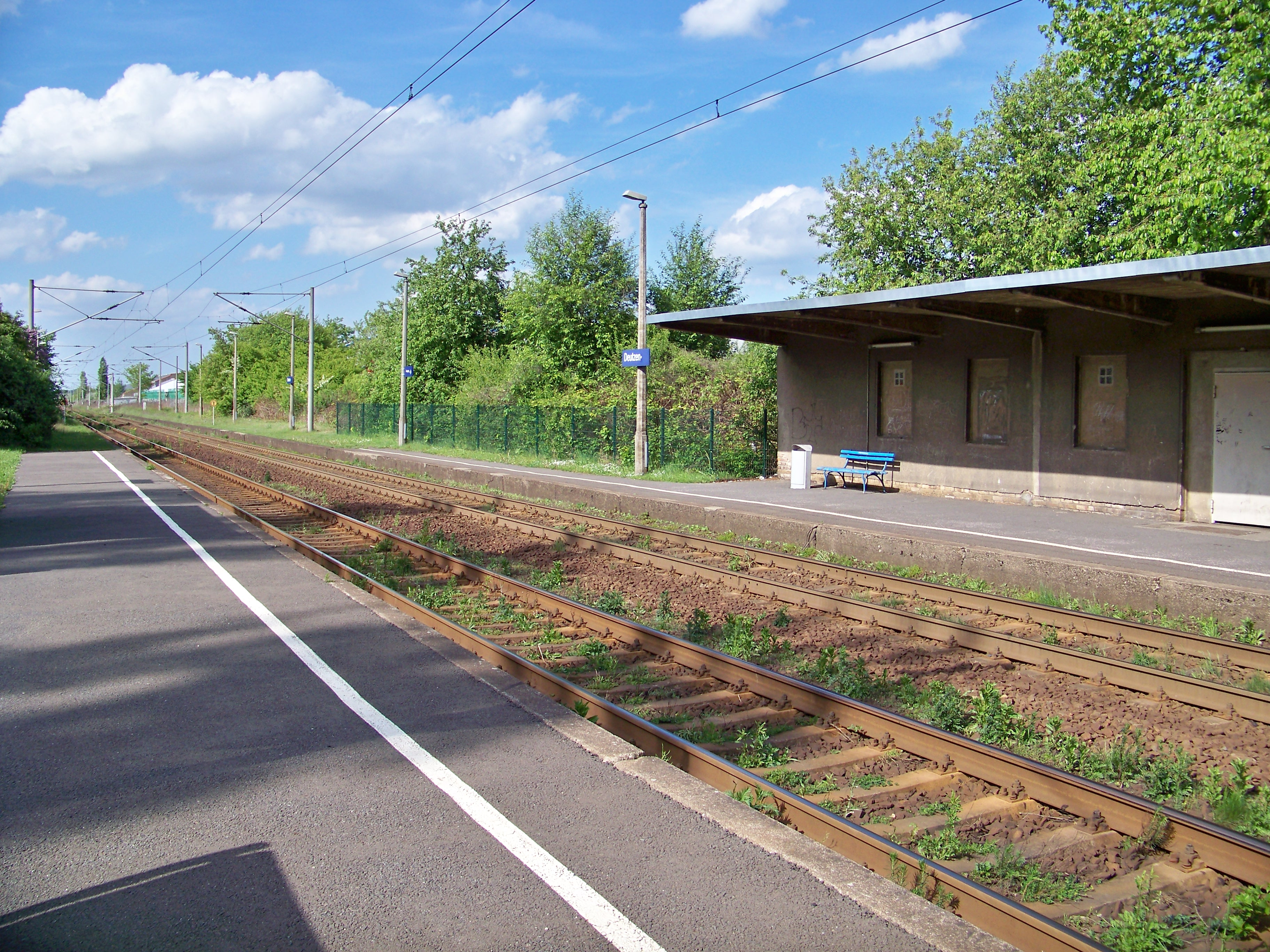
Deutzen station

Deutzen (51°06′52″N 12°25′10″E)

Deutzen station was opened on 15 November 1919. At this time, the village of Deutzen, now known as Alt-Deutzen ("old Deutzen"), was east of the modern Deutzen in the area now covered by Borna reservoir. At this time, the town experienced enormous population growth due to the opening of a brown coal mine. East of the station, the Deutzen opencast mine was put in operation between 1910 and 1963. After 1965 the town of (new) Deutzen was built on the already worked area, since the centre of the old town had been subsumed by the Borna-West open-cast mine. The area west of the station and the railway is currently being worked by the United Schleenhain coal mine.

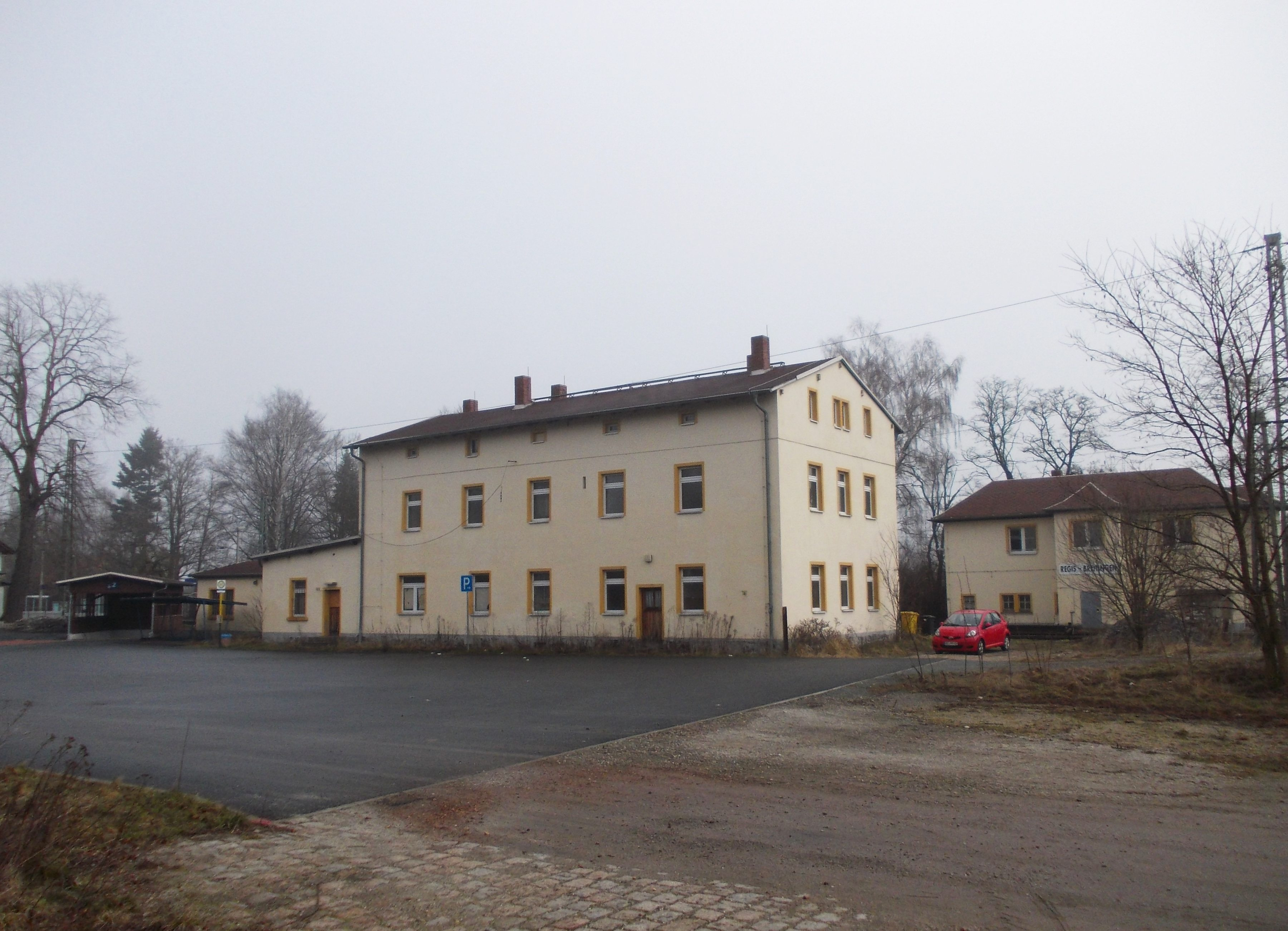
Regis-Breitingen station

Regis-Breitingen (51°04′59″N 12°25′34″E)

Breitingen halt was renamed Breitingen–Regis in 1902 and reclassified as a station in 1905. With the merger of Regis and Breitingen as Regis-Breitingen in 1920, the station also changed its name to Regis-Breitingen.

The station is the last stop in Saxony in the fare zone of the Mitteldeutscher Verkehrsverbund (middle German transport association). It has formed part of the S-Bahn Mitteldeutschland since 15 December 2013.

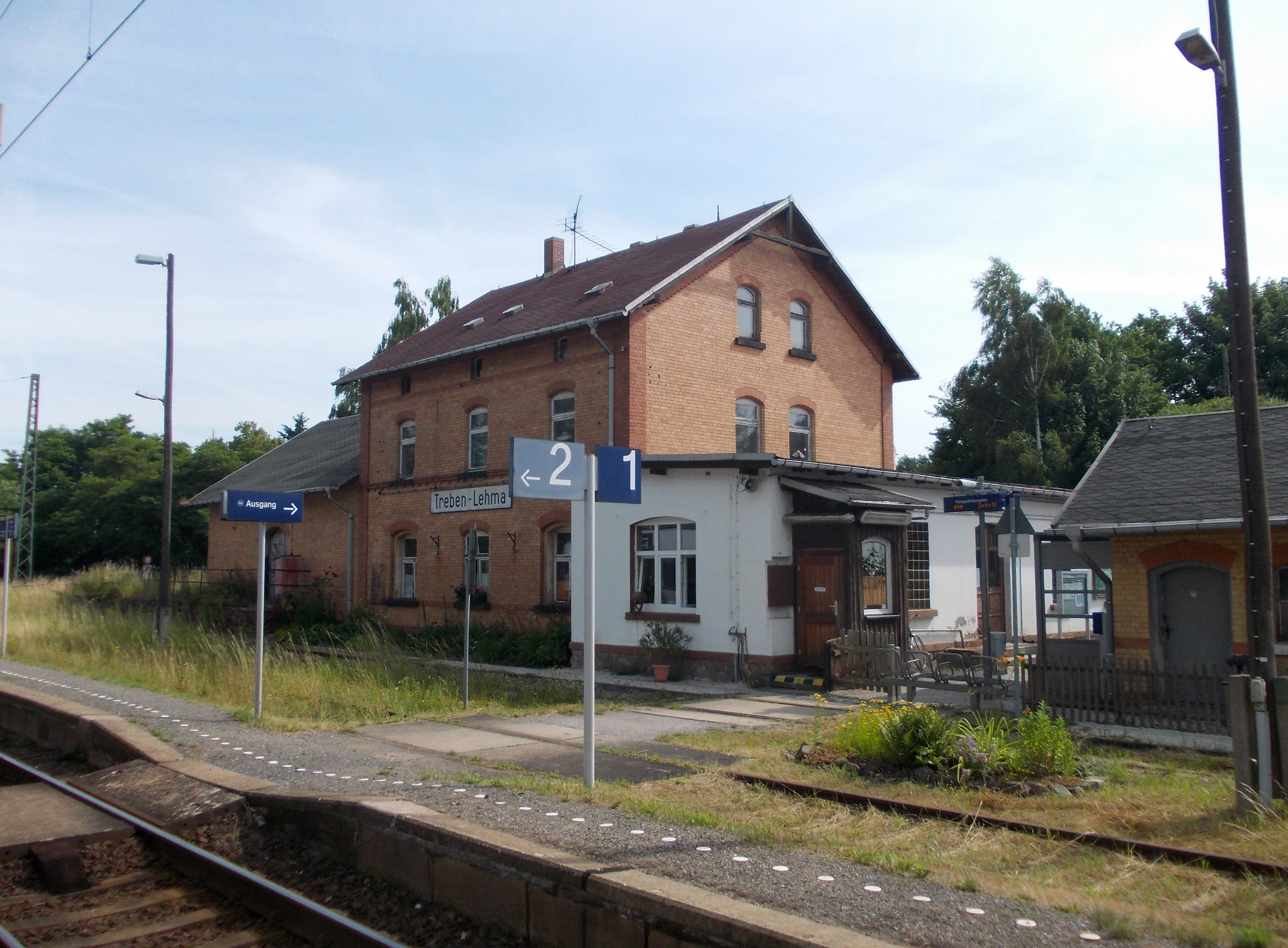
Treben–Lehma station in Trebanz

Treben–Lehma (51°02′48″N 12°26′26″E)

Treben–Lehma halt was opened on 2 December 1889 as Trebanz–Treben. Between 1905 and 1970, it was classified as a station, but since then it has been a halt. It was renamed Lehma in 1952, but it has been called Treben–Lehma since 1953.

Travelling towards Hof, Treben-Lehma is the first station in the state of Thuringia (it was in Saxe-Altenburg until 1920). It has been served by the S-Bahn Mitteldeutschland since 15 December 2013. The station is located in the municipality of Treben between the districts of Treben in the north-east and Trebanz (in which it is located) and Lehma in the south-west. In addition to the entrance building, the freight sheds and the workshops are also preserved.

Altenburg (50°59′48″N 12°26′39″E)

Initially, Altenburg was a terminal station, as the Duchy required the station to be as close to the town as possible. Since a direct extension to the south was not possible with the technology then available, trains, after reversing, originally continued of a line that bypassed the town to the east.

Since the dead-end station on today's Fabrikstraße became more and more of a problem for rail operations, planning for a change of route commenced in 1871. Instead of building a connecting line between the two original approach lines, Altenburg received a new station, which was connected to the south by a tunnel. The new station was completed in 1878 after two years of construction.

The now decommissioned railway to Zeitz branched from the station from 1872.

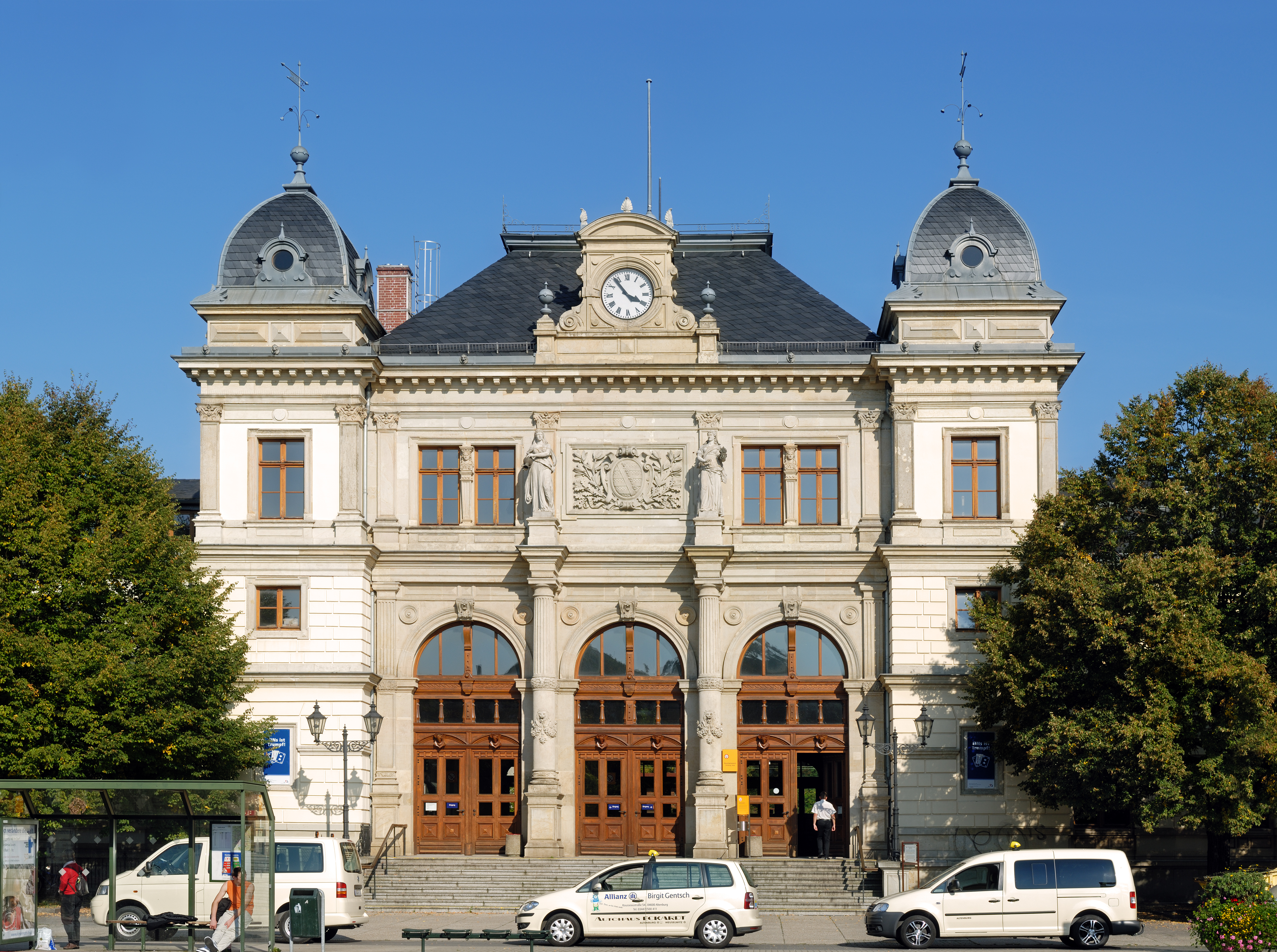
Altenburg station building (2009)

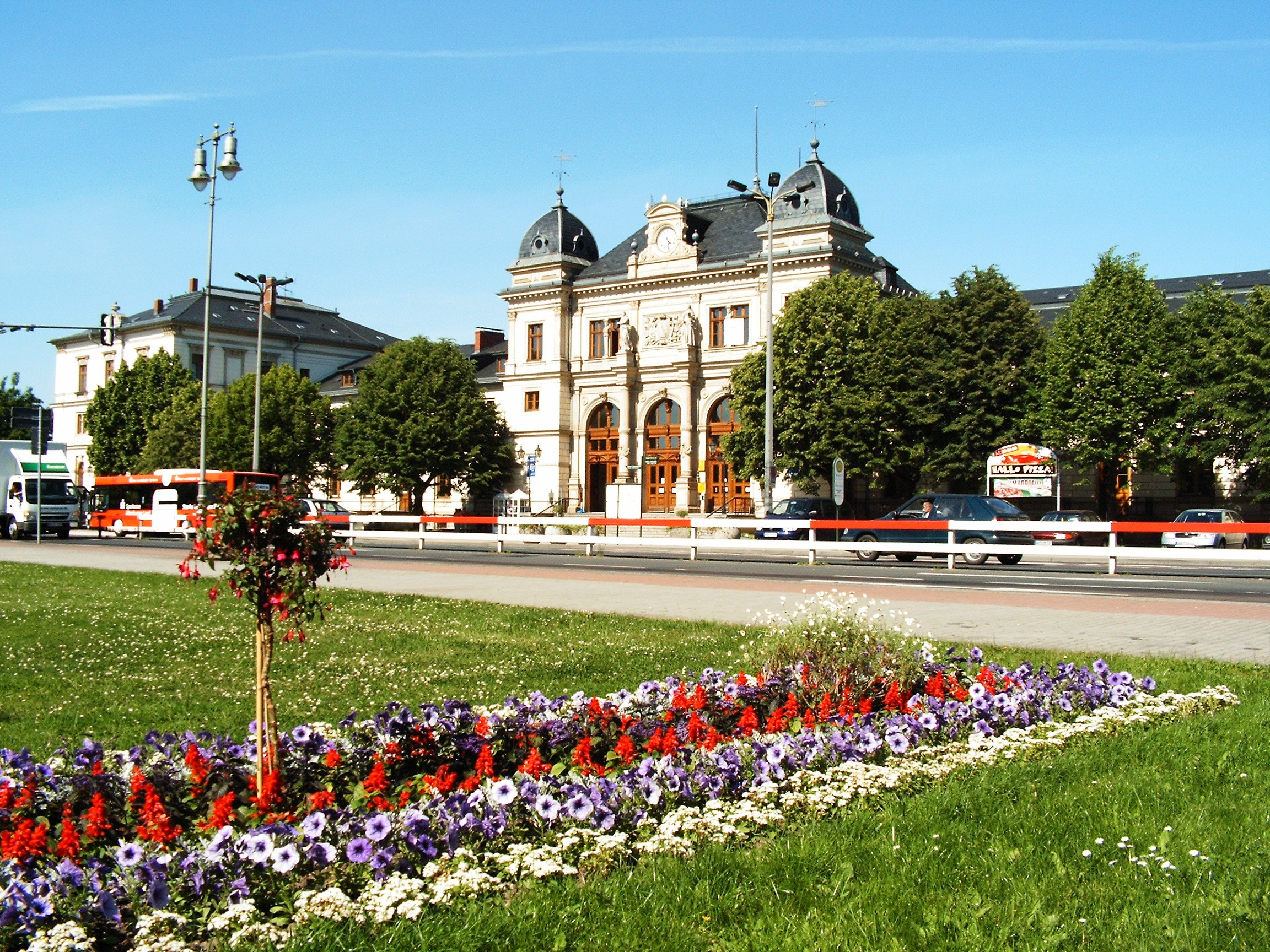
Station front in 2006

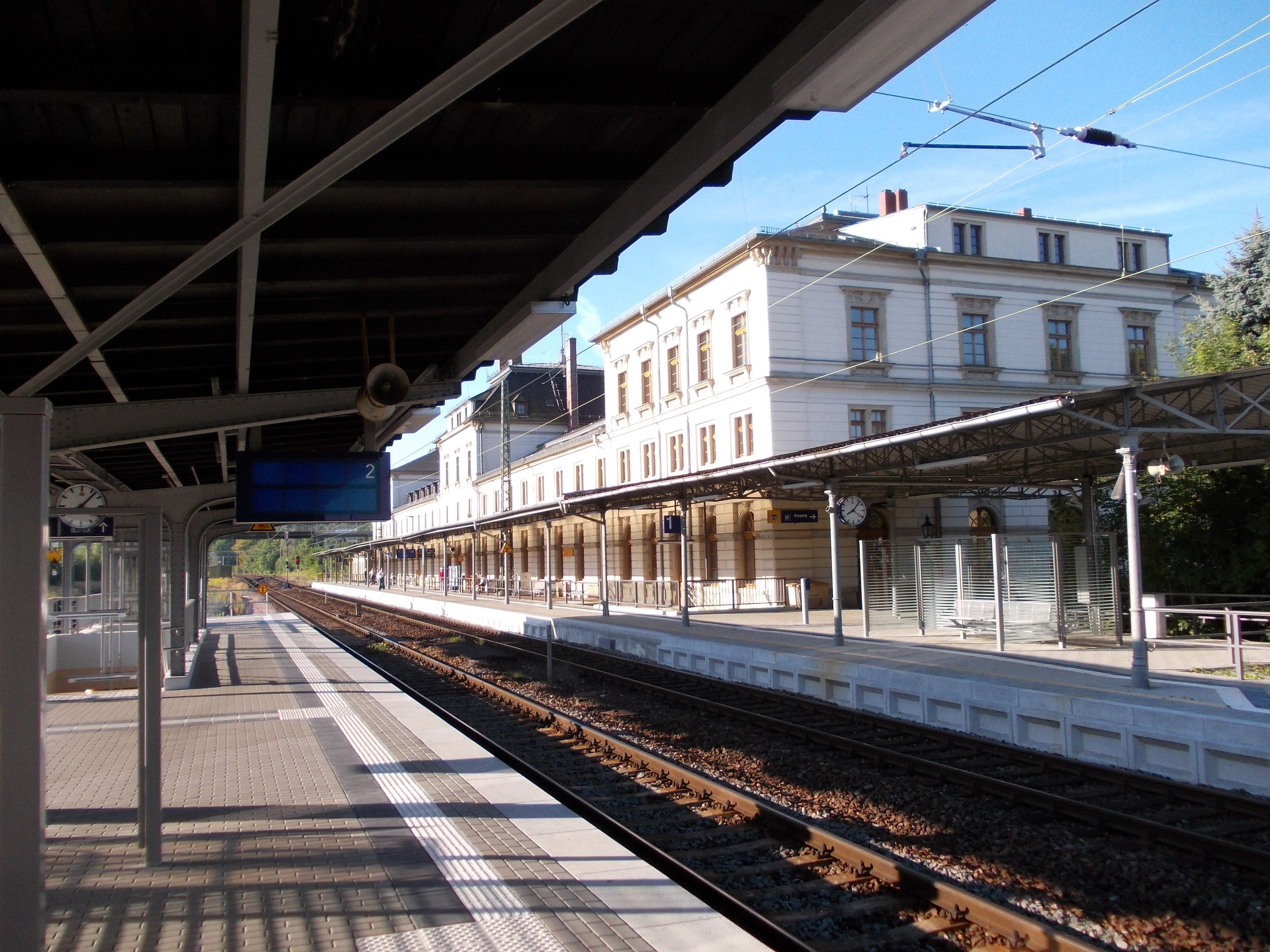
Track side in 2012

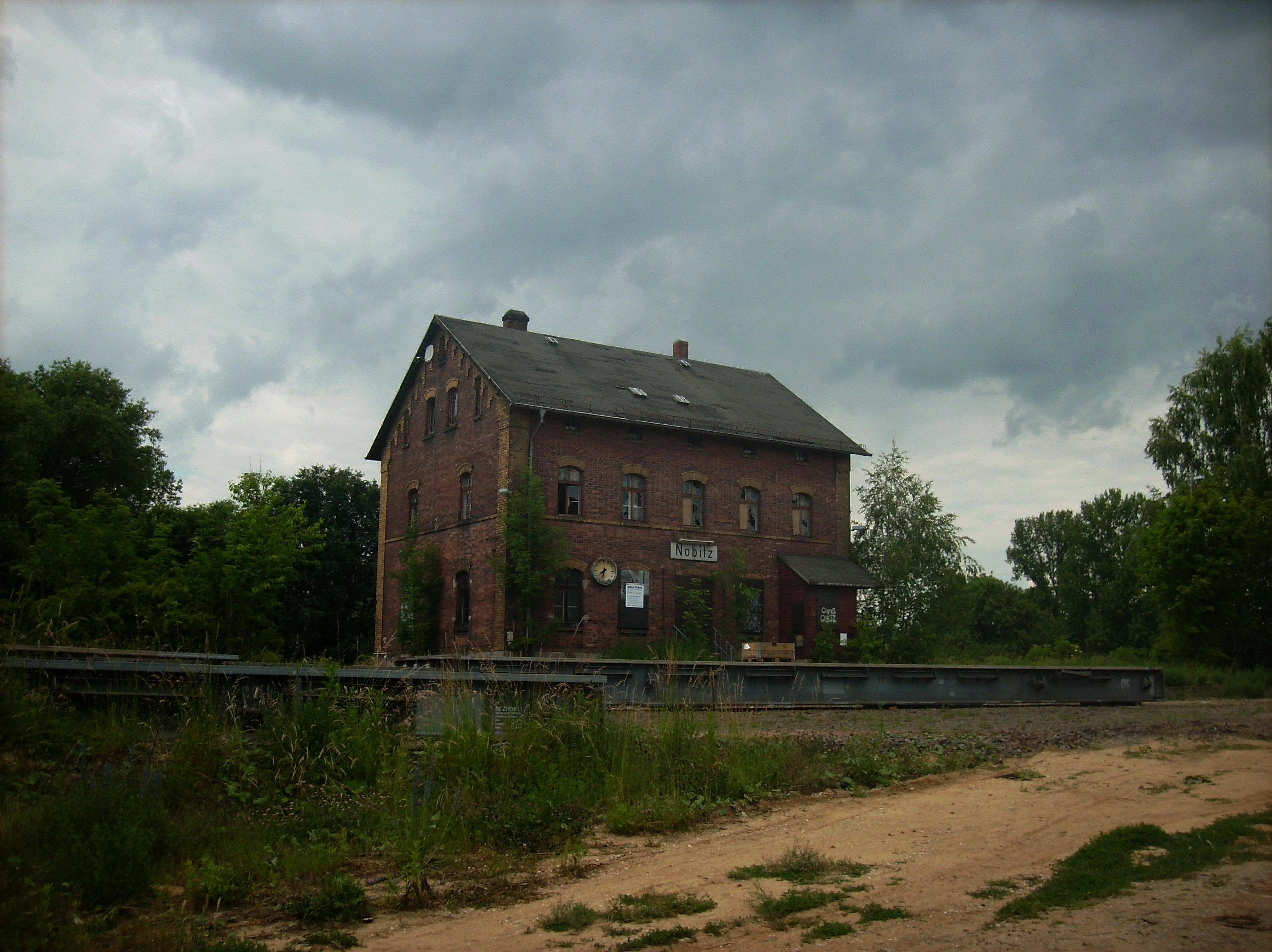
Nobitz station

Nobitz (50°58′26″N 12°28′22″E)

Nobitz station lay on the Altenburg–Langenleuba-Oberhain railway, which opened in 1901. It ran from a nearby junction on the Leipzig–Hof railway, which was controlled by signal box B1. This has been out of operation since the points to the line, which was closed in 1998, were removed.

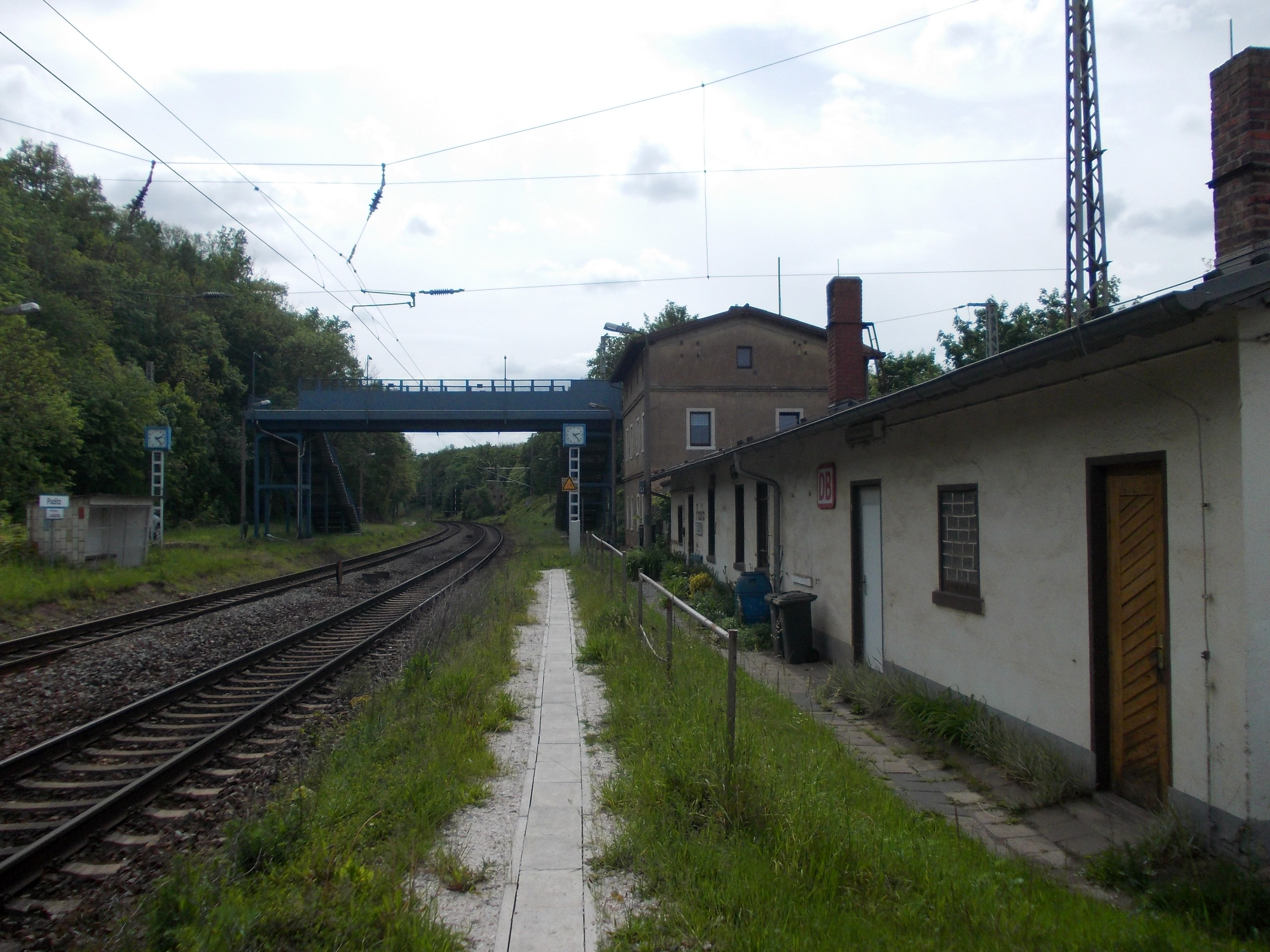
Paditz station

Paditz (50°57′54″N 12°27′43″E)

Paditz halt was opened on 1 December 1886 as Paditz Ladestelle (loading point). It has been called Paditz since 1911. The station was converted into a freight station in 1933, later reclassified as a station and finally reduced to a halt. It was taken out of service on 12 December 2010. The entrance building consists of a low-rise building, but there are more modern waiting-rooms on the platform.

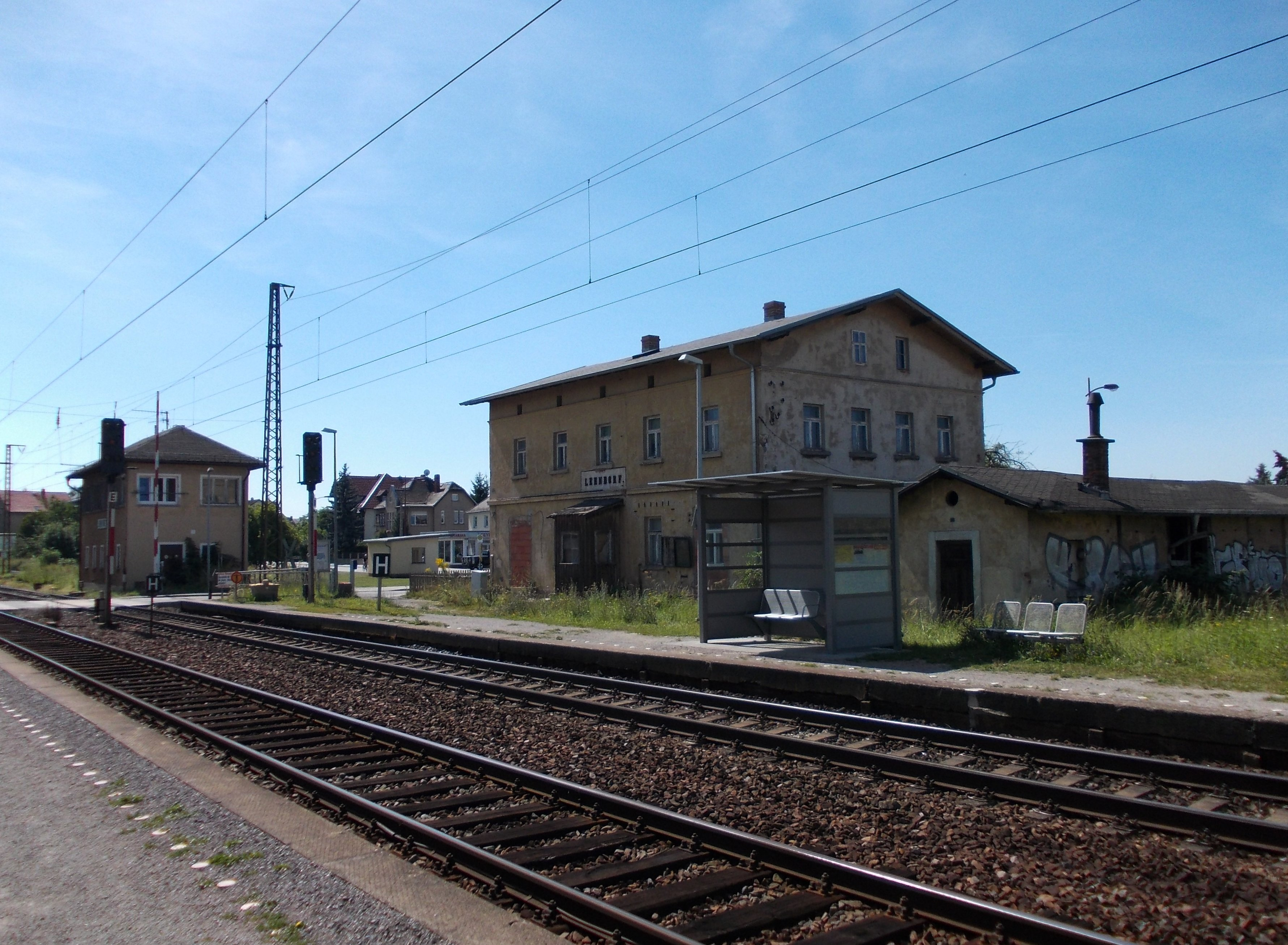
Lehndorf (Kr Altenburg) station

Lehndorf (Kr Altenburg) (50°56′16″N 12°25′33″E)

The Lehndorf halt was opened on 1 December 1877. It was upgraded to a station in 1905 and renamed Lehndorf (Kr Altenburg) in 1927. The buildings (entrance buildings, workshops and freight sheds) still present in the station are marked by decay. Lehndorf (Kr Altenburg) is on the Lehndorf (Kr Altenburg)–Saara curve connecting with the Gößnitz–Gera railway opened in 1865. Therefore, the station is an important change station between trains on the Leipzig–Hof railway to/from Altenburg/Leipzig and trains to/from Gera/Jena/Erfurt in Thuringia.

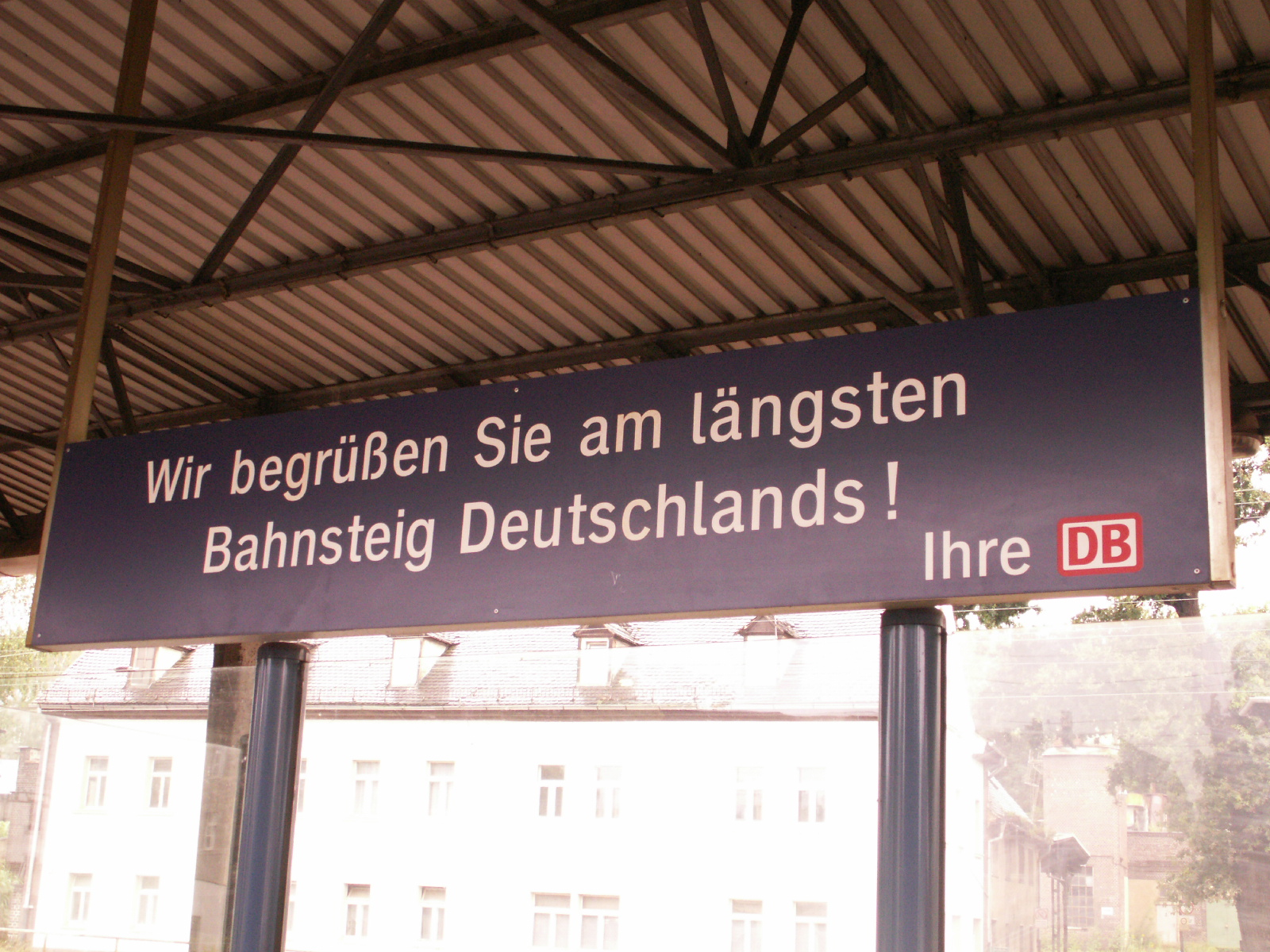
”Längster Bahnsteig Deutschlands” (longest station in Germany” sign in Gößnitz station (2007)

Gößnitz (50°53′34″N 12°25′46″E)

Gößnitz station is an interchange with the Schönbörnchen–Gößnitz and Gößnitz–Gera railways. It has been part of the Bahnstrecke Leipzig–Hof railway since 1844. The neo-baroque entrance building was demolished in 2010. Its operational feature is the 603.50 metres long island platform, which can hold up to four trains at the same time. According to a sign erected by Deutsche Bahn, it is the longest platform in Germany.

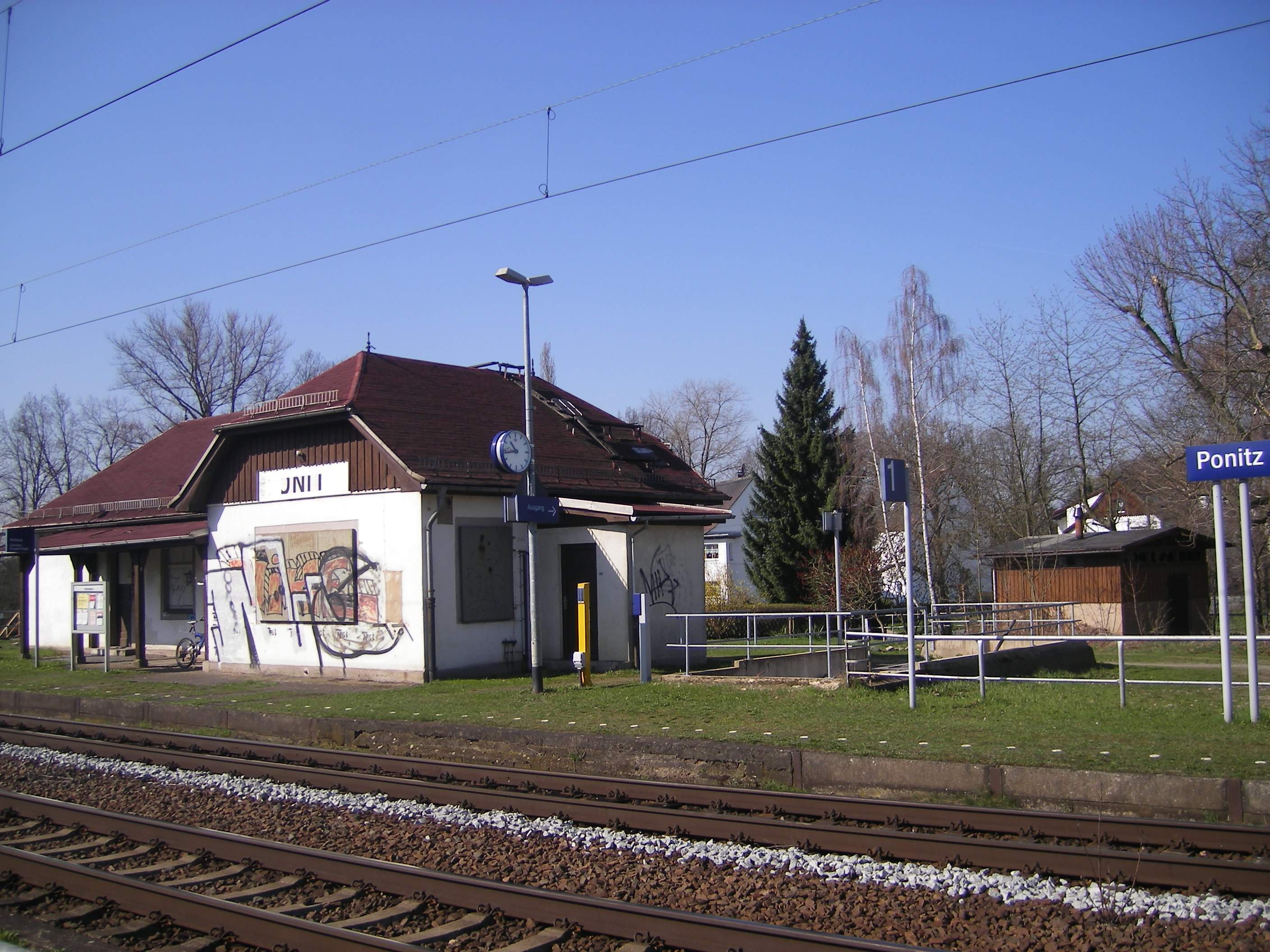
Ponitz station

Ponitz (50°51′29″N 12°25′00″E)

The Ponitz halt was opened on 15 August 1912. It was classified as a station between 1905 and 1933 and it has been a halt since.

Ponitz is the last station in the state of Thuringia (in Saxe-Altenburg until 1920) on the line towards Hof. In addition, it is the last station in the area with fares set by the Mitteldeutscher Verkehrsverbund (central Germany transport association). It has been served by the S-Bahn Mitteldeutschland since 15 December 2013.

Crimmitschau (50°48′54″N 12°23′35″E)

Crimmitschau station was opened on 15 March 1844. It was the starting point of the Crimmitschau–Schweinsburg railway between 1908 and 1963, which was only used for freight transport. Today it is only classified as a Haltestelle (literally "halt place"), which indicates that it includes a halt (Haltepunkt) and a crossover.

Crimmitschau station is the first stop that is again in Saxony running towards Hof. It is also the first stop back in the fare zone of the Verkehrsverbund Mittelsachsen. It has been served by the S-Bahn Mitteldeutschland since 15 December 2013.

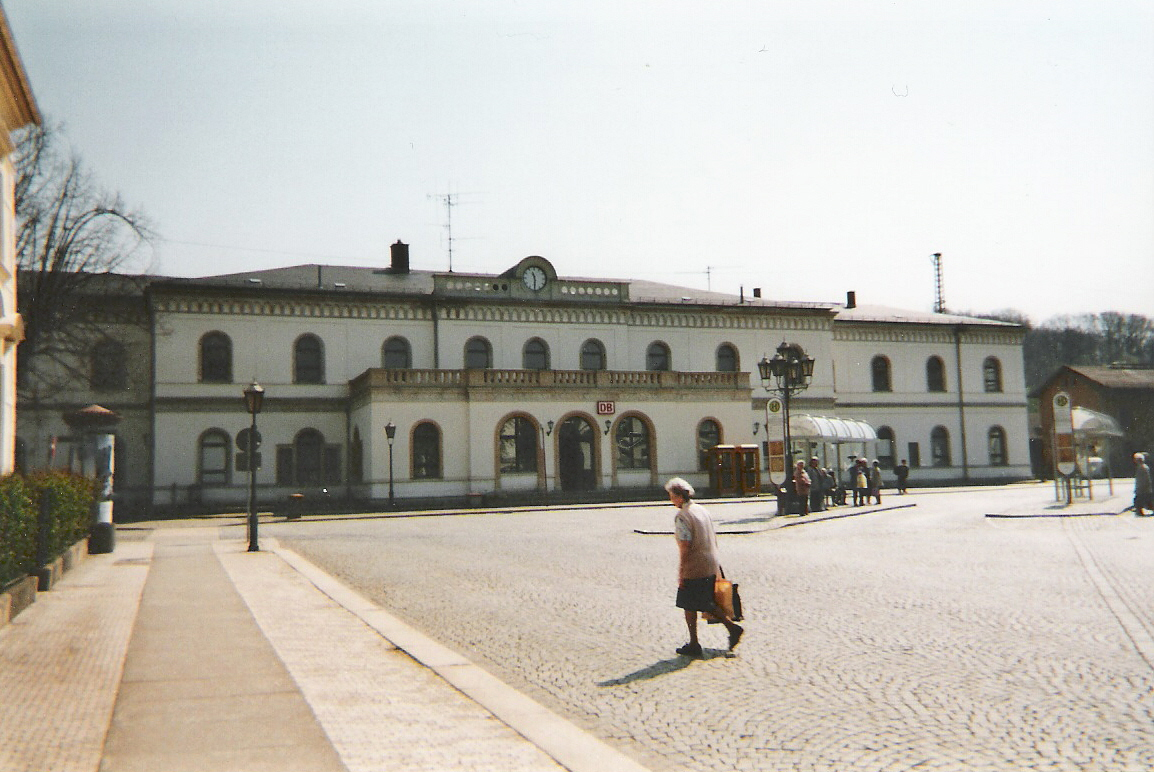
Crimmitschau station when the entrance building was still in use

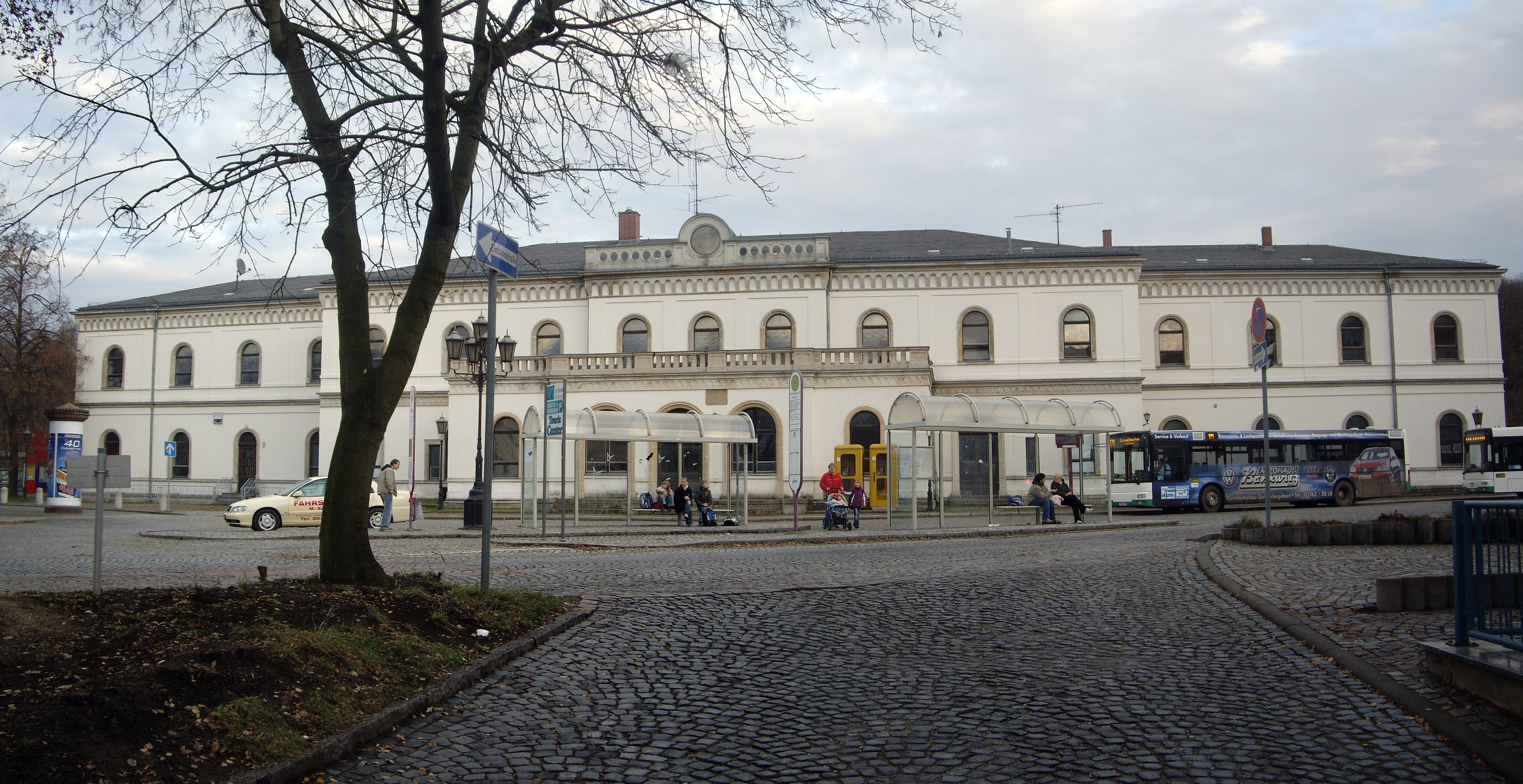
Crimmitschau station entrance building

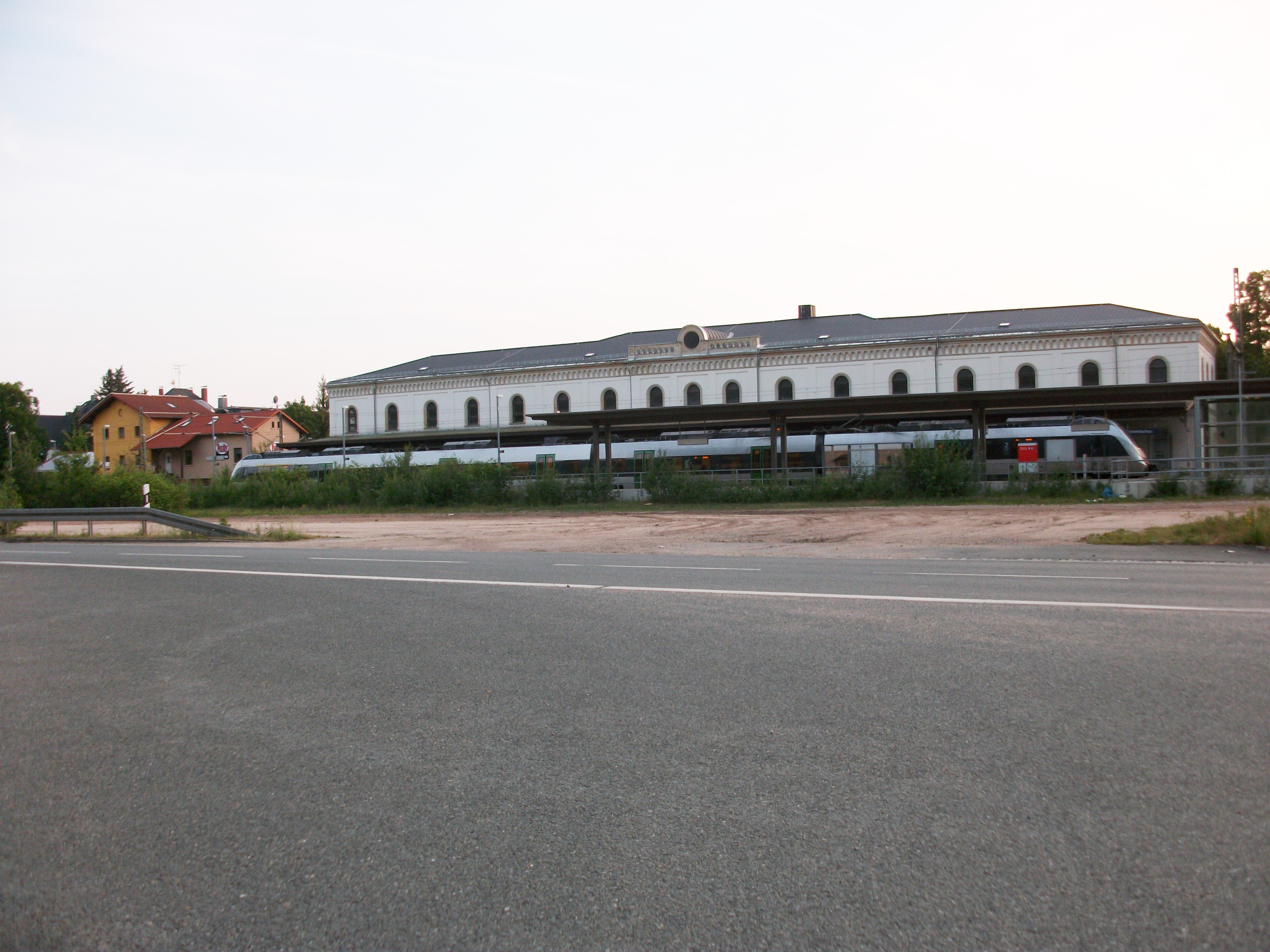
Crimmitschau station with an S-Bahn service (2016)

Schweinsburg-Culten (50°47′14″N 12°22′10″E)

Schweinsburg-Culten was opened on 1 June 1887 as Culten halt and it was renamed Schweinsburg-Culten in 1908. In 1934 th the two villages were incorporated as the municipality Schweinsburg-Culten, which in turn was incorporated in 1950 into Neukirchen. Schweinsburg-Culten has become known through a train crash in 1972, in which 22 people died, one of the most serious to happen in the German Democratic Republic. The station is at the Mannichswalder Straße level crossing. The entrance building and the goods shed, which was located directly at the railway junction, are no longer used.

The station has been served by the S-Bahn Mitteldeutschland since 15 December 2013. Between 1908 and 1963, Ladestelle Schweinsburg (Schweinsburg loading point) still existed in the town; this was the terminus for goods traffic on the Crimmitschau–Schweinsburg railway.

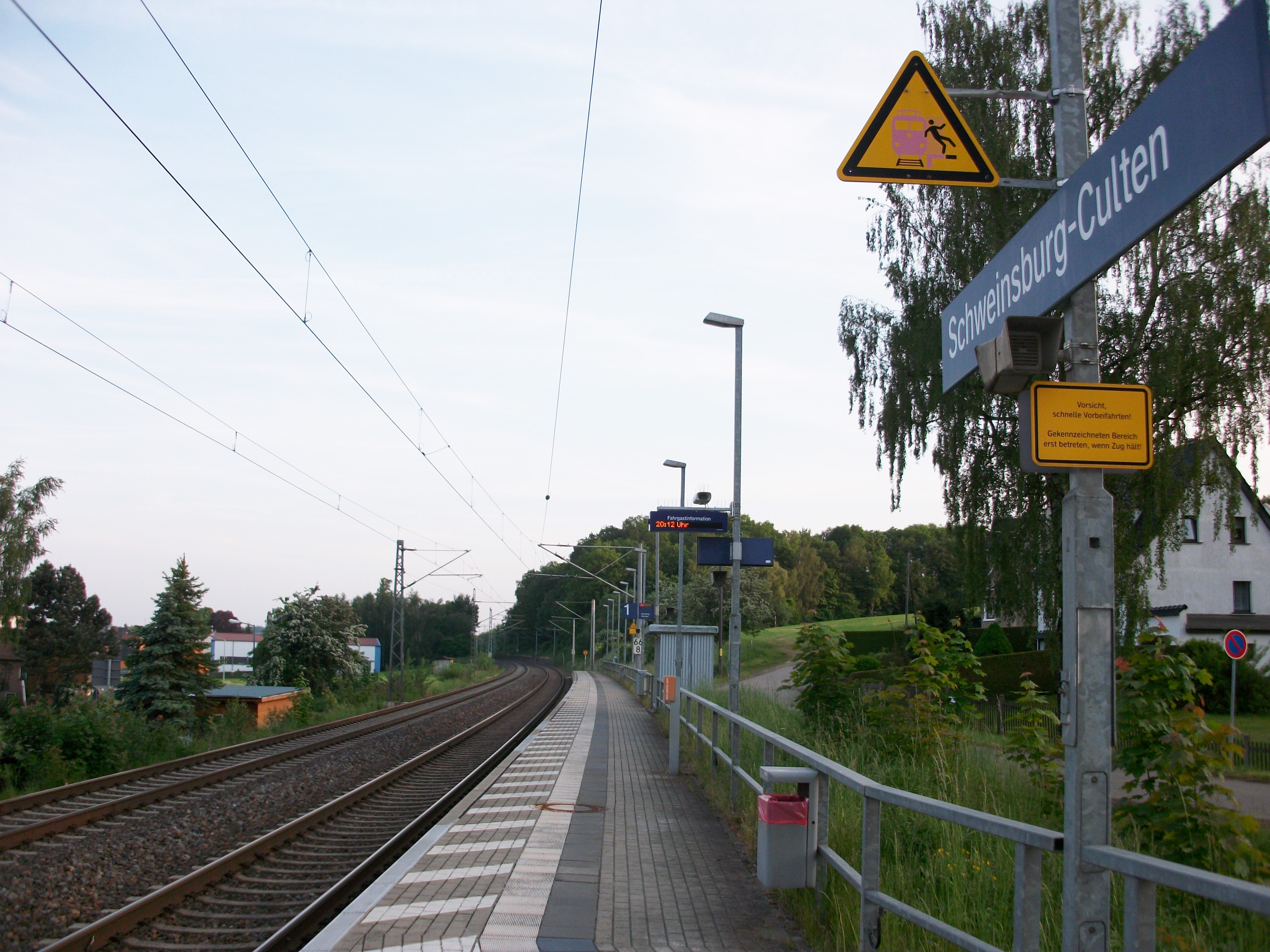
Schweinsburg-Culten station, looking towards Hof (2016)

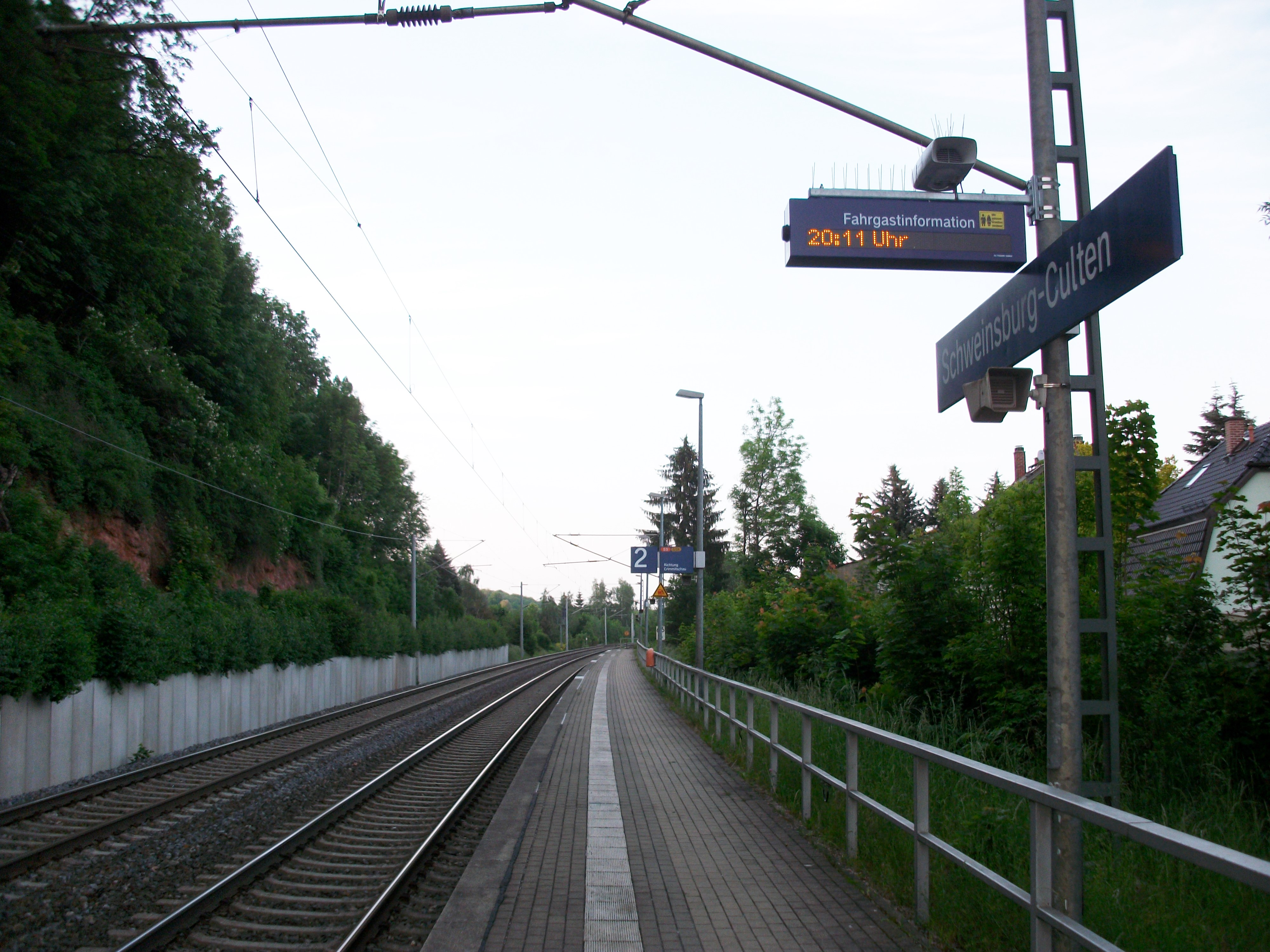
Schweinsburg-Culten station, looking towards Leipzig (2016)

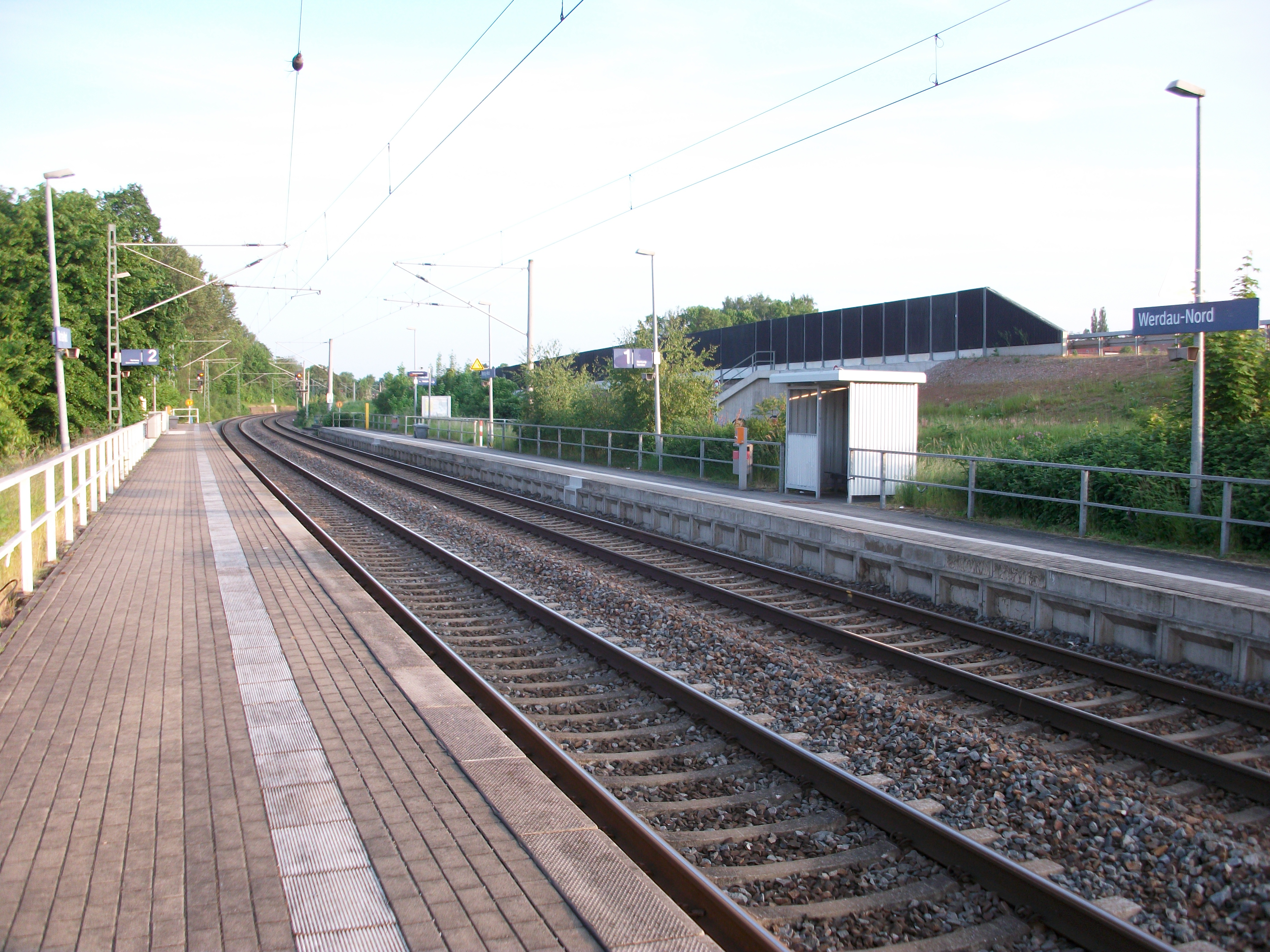
Werdau Nord station (2016)

Werdau Nord (50°44′37″N 12°22′17″E)

Werdau Nord was opened on 3 November 1898 as Ladestelle (loading place) Werdau-Langenhessen. It was made a halt on 1 July 1908 under the name of Werdau Nord. It has been served by the S-Bahn Mitteldeutschland since 15 December 2013. The entrance building, which still existed in 2001, no longer exists.

Werdau (50°43′39″N 12°22′02″E)

The station, opened in 1845, was originally far from the town centre, but Werdau slowly grew towards the station in the following decades. In those years, the station was only expanded a bit at a time and after the opening of the Werdau–Mehltheuer railway, the station was no longer sufficient for the traffic. So, around 1900, the station was fundamentally reconstructed at a cost of about 1.5 million Marks.

Nevertheless, the facilities were again too small in the 1920s and, as an expansion of the grounds of the station was hardly possible, a new marshalling yard was built in Zwickau. At the end of the 1990s, the station was almost completely rebuilt and the facilities of the former locomotive depot was also completely removed.

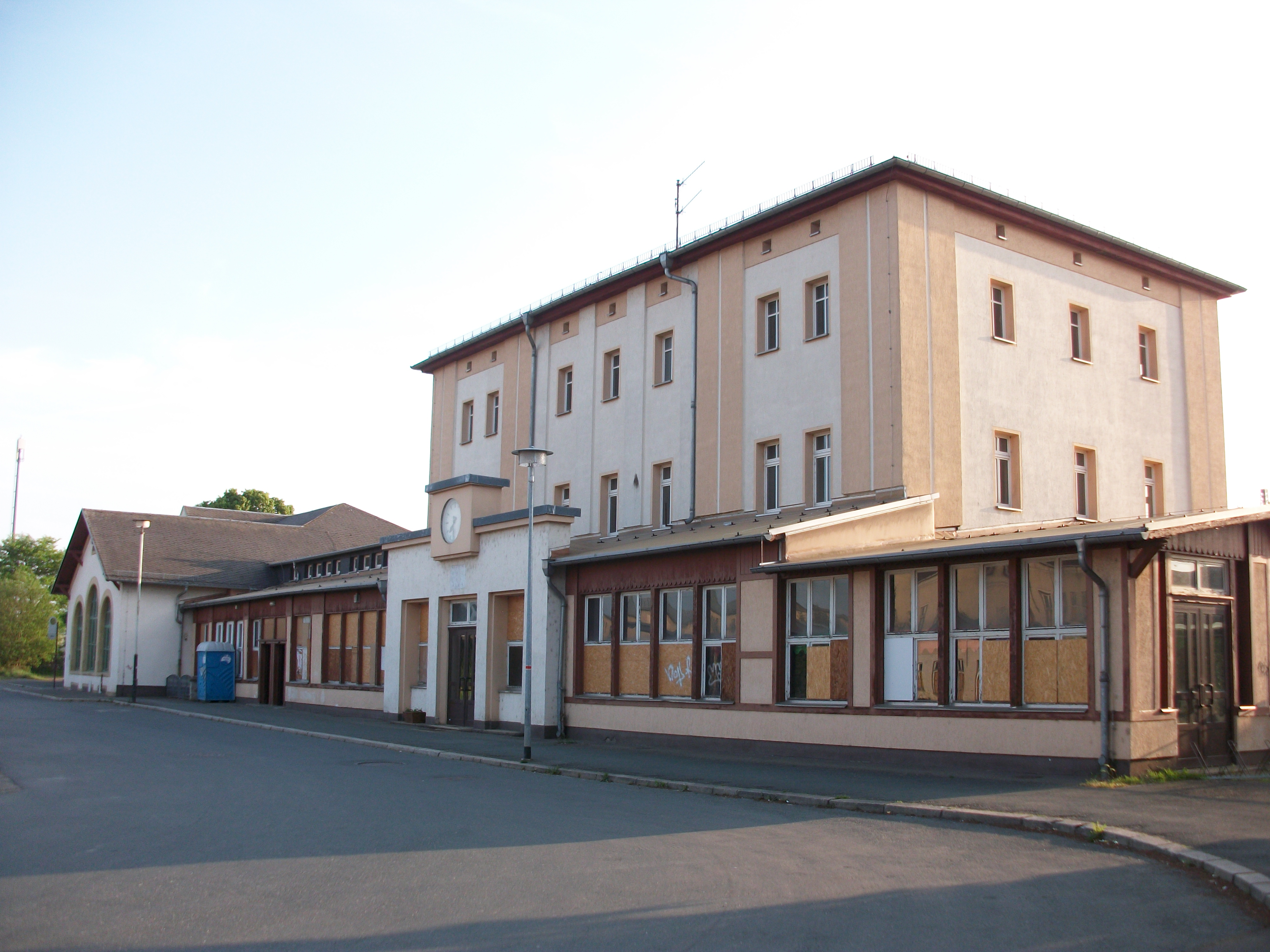
Werdau station, entrance building (2016)

Werdau station with an S-Bahn train (2016)

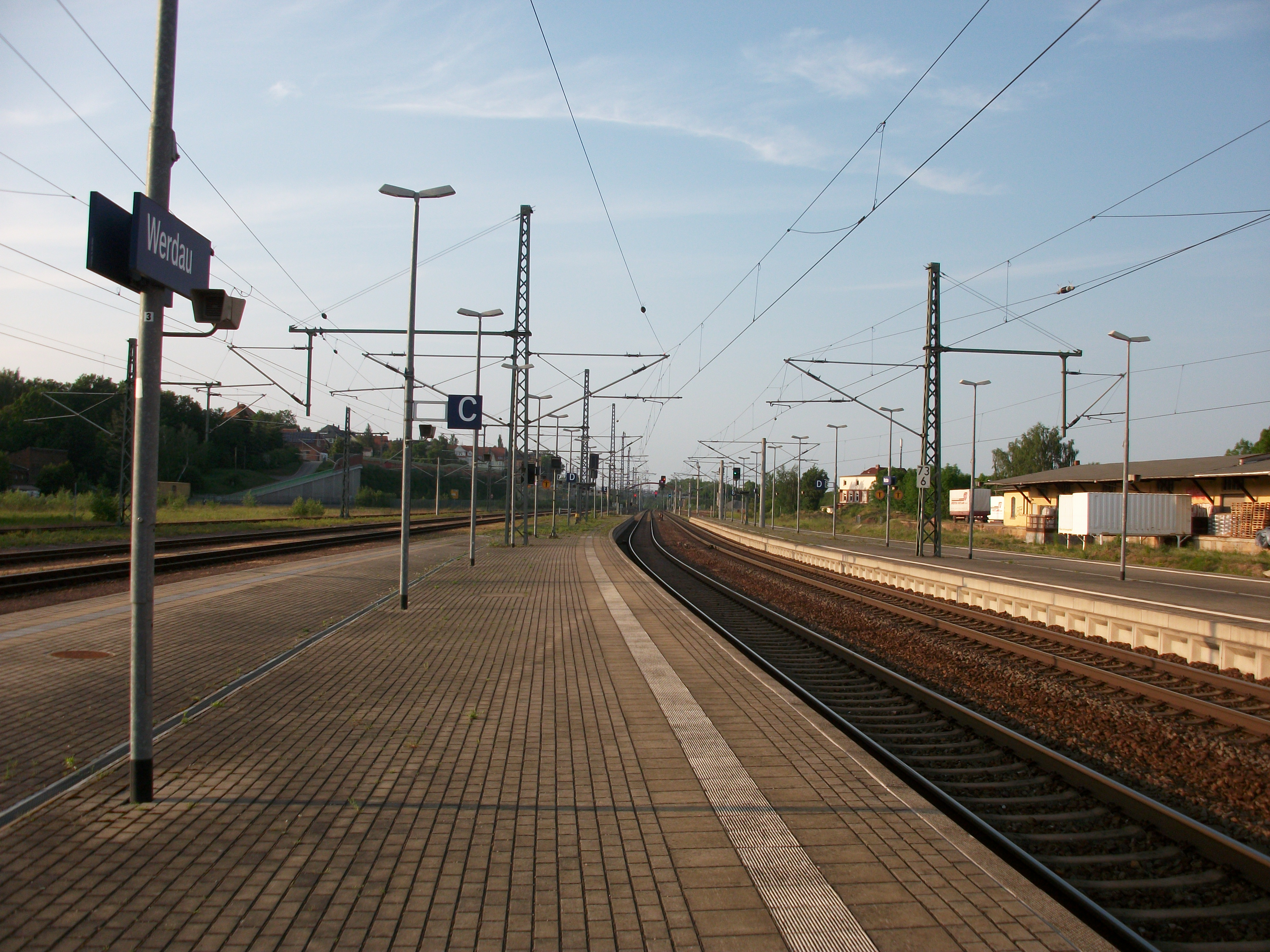
Werdau station, platforms (2016)

Werdau wye (Werdau Bogendreieck) (50°42′42″N 12°22′44″E)

With the completion of the Leipzig-Werdau section of the Leipzig–Hof railway line on 6 September 1845, the 8.10 kilometre-long branch line to Zwickau was also opened. With the opening of the line towards Reichenbach on 31 May 1846, a simple branch was opened that later developed into a wye junction. Construction began on the connecting railway on 25 June 1855 and construction of the main line towards Zwickau began on 15 November 1855. The two new lines were opened on 15 November 1858. The double-tracked Zwickau–Neumark connecting curve had already been opened at the former Werdau junction. This was now referred to as the Bogendreieck Werdau (Werdau wye junction).

As a result of its connection of the Dresden–Werdau and the Leipzig–Hof railways, The Werdau wye has a significance that extends beyond Saxony. It is part of the Saxon-Franconian trunk line (Sachsen-Franken-Magistrale) and is included in the plans for the Mid-Germany Railway (Mitte-Deutschland-Verbindung).

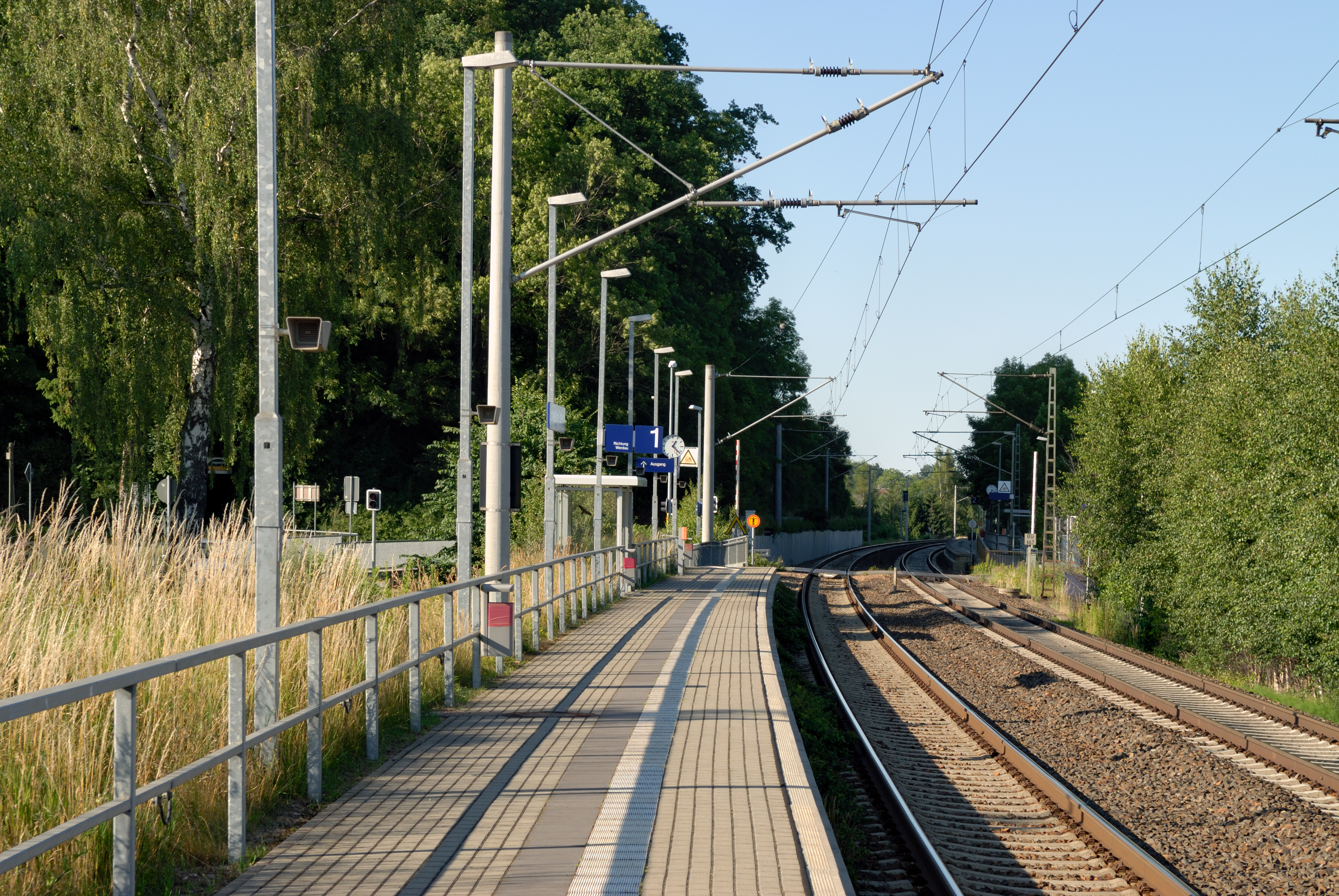
Neumark station

Neumark (Sachs) (50°39′37″N 12°21′10″E)

Although Neumark station was opened as early as 1846, it became more important with the opening of the Neumark–Greiz railway by the private Greiz-Brunner Eisenbahn-Gesellschaft (Greiz-Brunn Railway Company) in 1865. The station was expanded several times up to 1900 and then remained essentially unchanged until the 1990s. Although the line to Greiz was closed in 1999, the station did not completely lose its importance as the Vogtlandbahn (now Die Länderbahn) opened its central repair shop here in 2000.

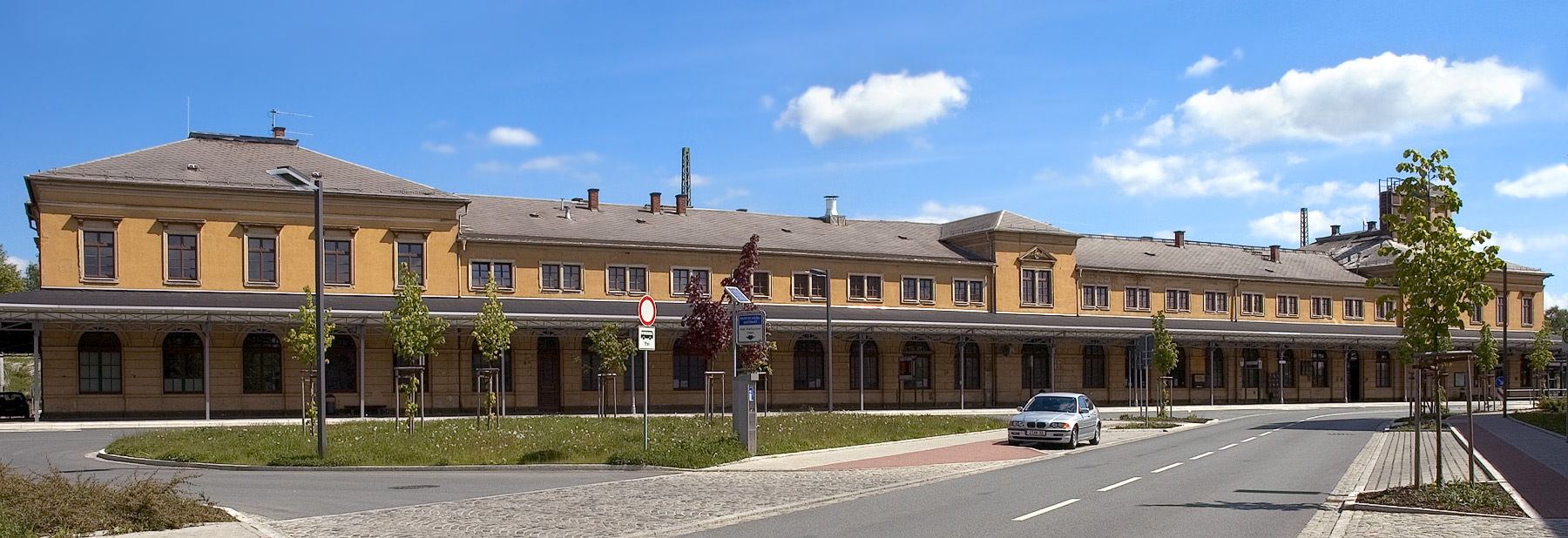
Reichenbach ob Bf, platforms connecting to the north used to be located on today's station forecourt

Reichenbach (Vogtl) ob Bf (50°37′39″N 12°17′44″E)

Although the station was only a transit station until the opening of the railway to the Göltzsch Viaduct in 1895, Reichenbach developed into a station of regional importance as a result of the building of a roundhouse with coal-loading facilities (Heizhaus) here. The locomotive depot was closed in 1999. In the 2000s the track layout was extensively rebuilt and since then Reichenbach station has not been an Inselbahnhof ("island station", that is a station surrounded by rail tracks) anymore.

Netzschkau (50°36′42″N 12°14′39″E)

Netzschkau was opened on 15 July 1851. Between 1886 and 1998 it was classified as a station, since then it has been a halt. The station is located in the centre of the village. The entrance building is in decline.

Limbach (Vogtl) (50°35′13″N 12°15′11″E)

Limbach (Vogtl) halt (until 30 June 1911, Bahnhof Limbach i. V) was opened in 1902. Apart from two platforms, two waiting rooms and an open entranceway, there were no other facilities. The waiting rooms have now been replaced by glass shelters.

Herlasgrün (50°34′16″N 12°14′08″E)

Although the Herlasgrün–Falkenstein-Ölsnitz–Adorf–Eger (now Cheb) line of the Voigtland State Railway (Voigtländische Staatseisenbahn) started at Herlasgrün station from 1865, it remained an insignificant stopover until the construction of the Plauen–Oelsnitz connection. Only then was Herlasgrün station significantly extended.

Since the 1990s, the station has been considerably rebuilt. The station has also lost its former importance as a stop for express trains.

Ruppertsgrün (50°34′30″N 12°10′34″E)

Ruppertsgrün halt was opened on 1 October 1905. The facilities consisted of two platforms, two waiting rooms, a service building as well as an open entranceway.

Jocketa (50°33′19″N 12°10′13″E)

Jocketa halt was opened on 15 July 1851. Between 1905 and 1999 it was classified as a station, since then it has been classified as a halt again. The station to the south of the village had an entrance building. It also had a freight shed and a Bahnmeisterei (track maintenance master's office). The buildings are all still there.

Jößnitz (50°32′15″N 12°08′24″E)

Jößnitz halt was opened on 1 October 1902. It is located to the east of the village. The entrance building is no longer in operation. A workshop also exists at the site.

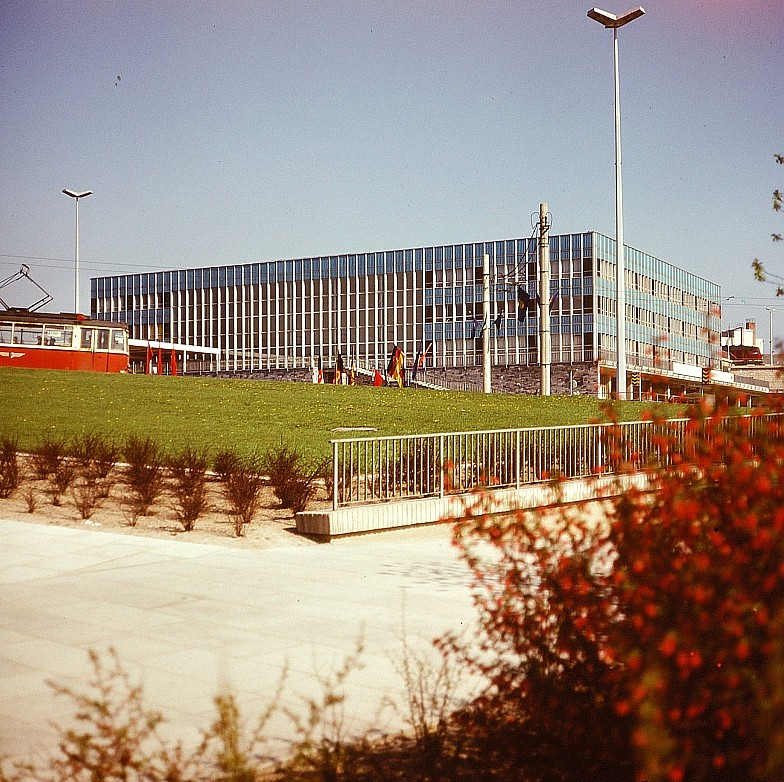
The new entrance building of Plauen upper station

Plauen (Vogtl) ob Bf (50°30′24″N 12°07′39″E)

Plauen received a connection to the railway network in 1848 with the opening of the Plauen–Hof section. At first, the tracks only ran to the north of the entrance building; with the opening of the Plauen–Oelsnitz connecting line in 1874, Plauen station was converted into an island station. At the same time, it received the addition of Oberer Bahnhof (upper station) to its name in 1875, since with the opening of the Gera Süd–Weischlitz railway, Plauen had gained a second station.

Because of the increased traffic, the station was constantly expanded until the turn of the century, but the facilities soon became inadequate. A large station reconstruction approved in 1913 could not be fully realised as a result the outbreak of the First World War and later by the lack of money.

At the end of the Second World War, the station was heavily damaged by air raids, so that the installations were strongly characterised by numerous provisional arrangements until the 1970s. It was not until 1972 that the last remaining war damage was removed with the opening of the new, distinctive entrance building.

The importance of the station has decreased considerably since 1989/90. Today only the service between Dresden and Nuremberg has been preserved of the numerous former long-distance services.

Syrau (50°32′41″N 12°05′07″E)

Syrau halt was opened on 20 December 1896. It was classified as a station between 1926 and 1991, since then it has been a halt again. The station is located in the east of Syrau. It has an entrance building.

Mehltheuer (50°32′39″N 12°02′12″E)

The station only became significance after the opening of the Werdau–Mehltheuer railway. The station was greatly extended in the 1880s and a small locomotive depot was built. The next major changes took place immediately after the Second World War, when several tracks were dismantled. Seven of the former 29 tracks are still available today and there is also a connecting track to a liquid gas storage facility.

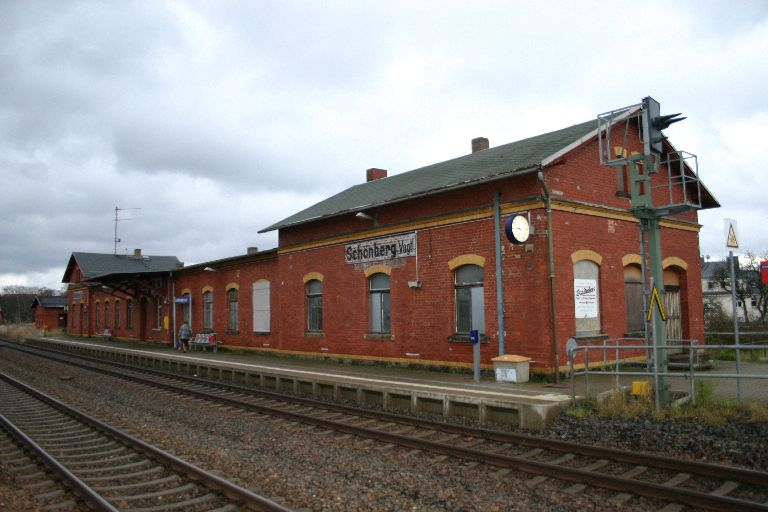
Schönberg (Vogtl) station, 2006

Schönberg (Vogtl) (50°31′43″N 11°57′40″E)

Until the opening of the railway to Schleiz in 1888, there was only an insignificant station on the Leipzig–Hof railway in Schönberg. From 1886, a single-storey entrance building, a roundhouse with coal-loading facilities (Heizhaus) and a coal shed were built. A freight shed had existed since 1875. With the construction of the railway to Hirschberg, the station was again enlarged at the beginning of the 20th century. In the 1990s, the island station was significantly rebuilt.

Reuth (b Plauen) (50°28′33″N 11°57′15″E)

Reuth station has existed since the start of the route. Following works at the end of the 19th century, the station had three through tracks, various marshalling tracks and a total of 17 sets of points. Until the restoration of the second track, Reuth was used for crossing trains. Since the end of the 1990s, there has been only a crossover and a siding.

Grobau (50°25′56″N 11°56′37″E)

Grobau halt was opened on 30 May 1959 and the facilities now consist of two outer platforms and a storage facility.

Gutenfürst (50°25′11″N 11°57′39″E)

Although the Gutenfürst halt had already opened in 1848, the station remained insignificant for a long time. Goods could be handled from 1877 and the halt was reclassified as a station in 1905. Gutenfürst gained importance only after 1945, when the station became a border station with the creation of the inner German border. While, in the early years it was relatively unsecured, Gutenfürst developed into something like a fortress at the end of the 1970s. Border controls were carried out to the summer of 1990, but the station is now again insignificant.

Feilitzsch (50°21′50″N 11°56′00″E)

Feilitzsch station was opened on 1 June 1883 as a halt for freight and passengers. Although lying in Bavaria, it received a typical Saxon entrance building, since the line to Hof was operated by the Saxon State Railways. From 1905 onwards, the station only had a few freight tracks beside the two main thorough tracks. In 1946, with the creation of the boundary between the Soviet occupation zone and Feilitzsch station, it changed from being supervised by Rbd (Reichsbahndirektionen) Dresden to Rbd Regensburg. Until 1973, there were still some passenger services between Hof and Feilitzsch, but it then closed for local passenger traffic. Freight operations were maintained to the station, but they were discontinued after the completion of the restoration of two tracks in 1993. Feilitzsch was transformed into a block post (Blockstelle). In 2006, Feilitzsch station was rebuilt a little north of its former location. Since 15 September 2006, Feilitzsch has again been served by local trains.

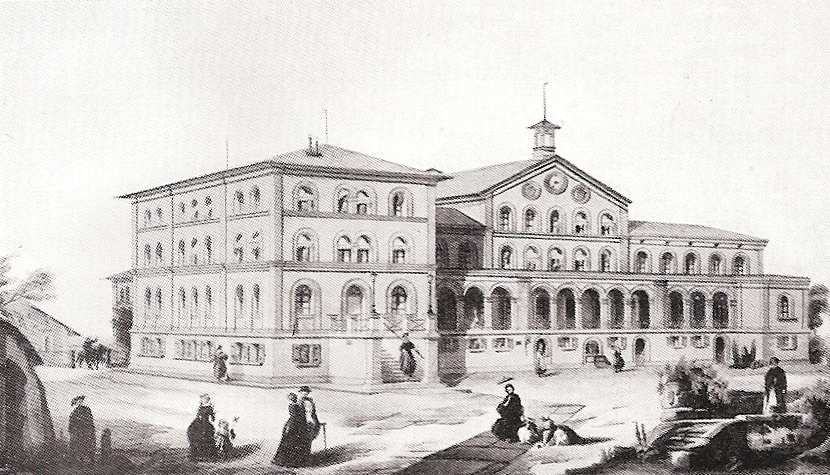
Entrance building of the first Hof station, 1851

Old Hof station (Alter Bahnhof Hof)

As in Altenburg, a dead-end station was built in Hof. At its opening in 1848, it connected with both the line from Plauen and the line from Bamberg.

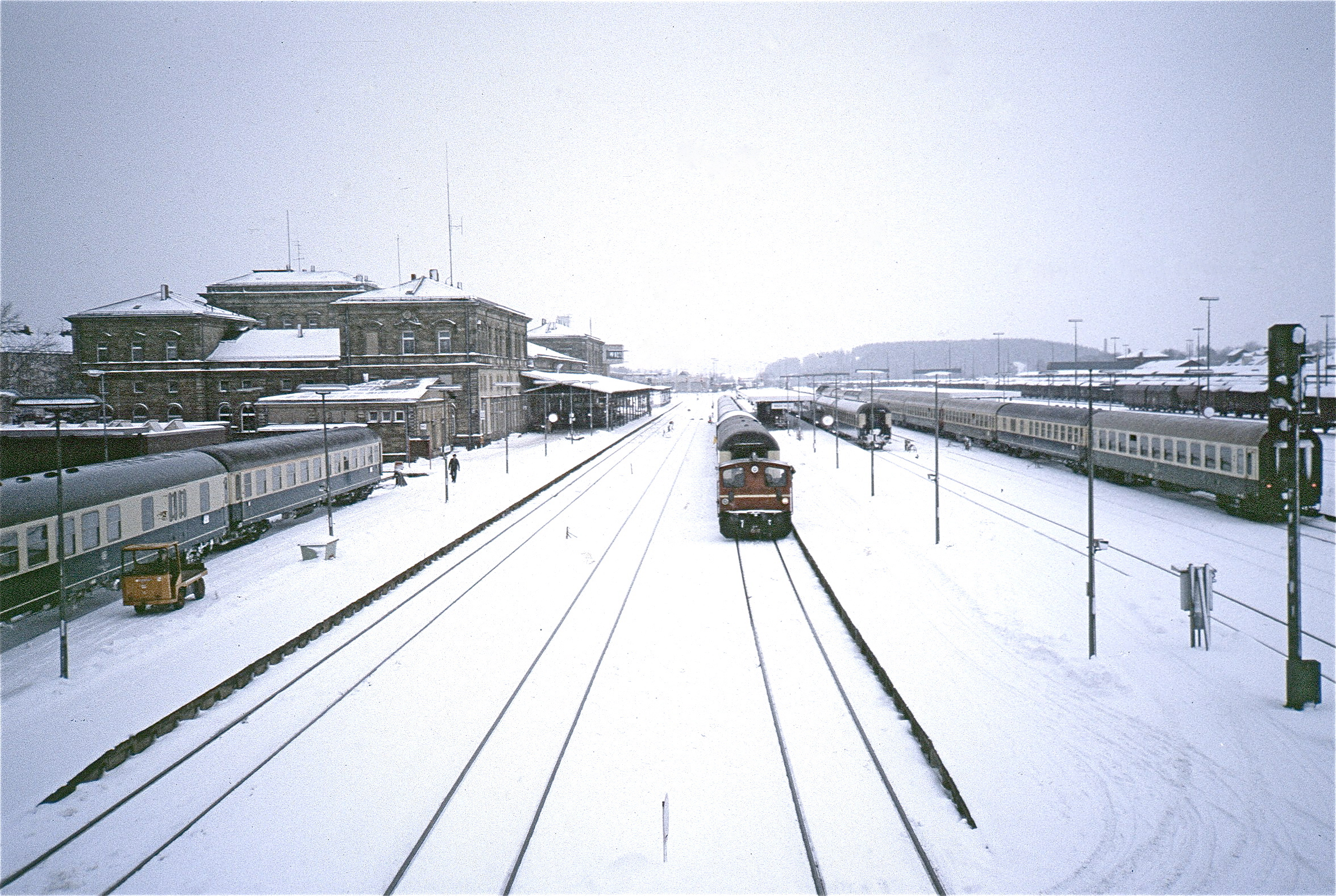
Hof Hauptbahnhof, 1986

Hof Hbf (50°18′28″N 11°55′19″E)

The original terminus in Hof was replaced in 1880 by a through station at another location. In the last decades, the railway junction has lost importance after the closure of some branch lines in the surrounding area and the closure of the Hof locomotive depot.
