= Altenburg =

City in Thuringia, Germany

- City
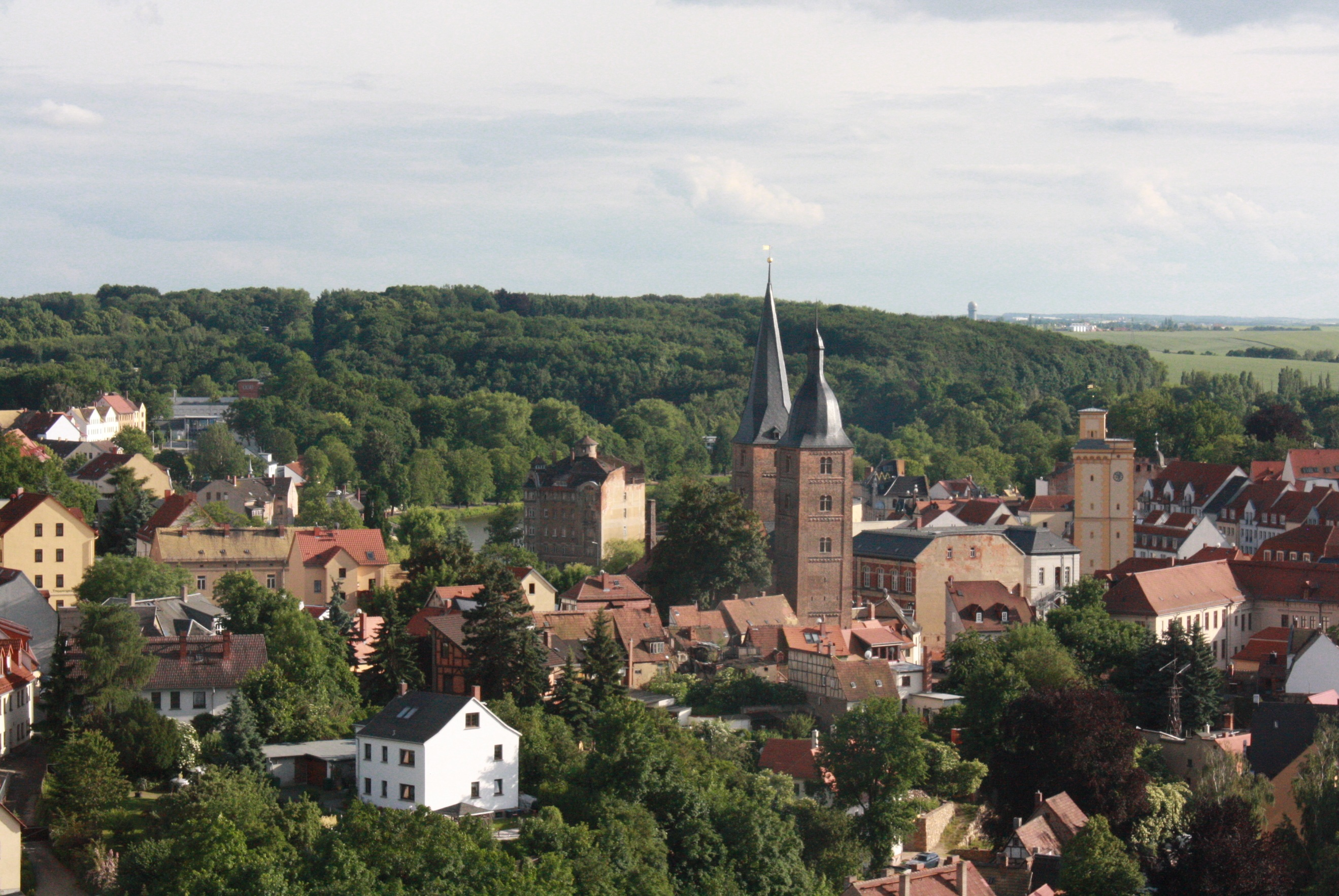

- Coat of arms

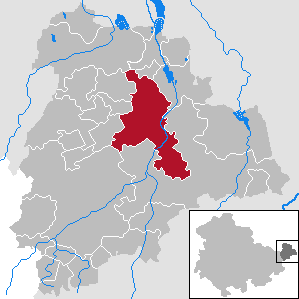
- Location of Altenburg within Altenburger Land district
- Interactive map of Altenburg
- Location within Germany Location within Thuringia
- Coordinates: 50°59′6″N 12°26′0″E
- Country: Germany
- State: Thuringia
- District: Altenburger Land
- Subdivisions: 4

Government
  - Mayor (2024–30): André Neumann (CDU)

Area
  - Total: 45.69 km^{2} (17.64 sq mi)
- Elevation: 202 m (663 ft)

Population (2025-12-31)
  - Total: 31,093
  - Density: 680.5/km^{2} (1,763/sq mi)
- Time zone: UTC+01:00 (CET)
  - Summer (DST): UTC+02:00 (CEST)
- Postal codes: 04600
- Dialling codes: 03447
- Vehicle registration: ABG, SLN
- Website: www.altenburg.eu

Altenburg (German pronunciation: [ˈaltn̩ˌbʊʁk]) is a city in Thuringia, Germany, located 40 kilometres (25 miles) south of Leipzig, 90 kilometres (56 miles) west of Dresden and 100 kilometres (62 miles) east of Erfurt. It is the capital of the Altenburger Land district and part of a polycentric old-industrial textile and metal production region between Gera, Zwickau and Chemnitz with more than 1 million inhabitants, while the city itself has a population of 33,000. Today, the city and its rural county is part of the Central German Metropolitan Region.

Altenburg was first mentioned in 976 and later became one of the first German cities within former Slavic area, east of the Saale river (as part of the medieval Ostsiedlung movement). The emperor Frederick Barbarossa visited Altenburg several times between 1165 and 1188, hence the town is named a Barbarossa town today. Since the 17th century, Altenburg was the residence of different Ernestine duchies, of whom the Saxe-Altenburg persisted until the end of monarchy in Germany in 1918. Industrialization reached Altenburg and the region quite early in the first half of the 19th century and flourished until the Great Depression around 1930. Economic malaise set in while Altenburg was in East Germany and continued after German reunification in 1990, evidenced by a decline in population, high unemployment and house vacancy rates.

The main sights of Altenburg are the castle, the Lindenau-Museum, the historic city center (most buildings are from early-modern origin) and the Gründerzeit architecture around the center. The popular German card game Skat was developed in Altenburg during the 1810s and the founder of the famous Brockhaus Enzyklopädie, Friedrich Arnold Brockhaus, lived and worked in Altenburg between 1810 and 1817.

Altenburg lies in the flat and fertile landscape of Osterland on the Pleiße river in the very east of Thuringia, next to the neighboring federal state of Saxony.

== History ==
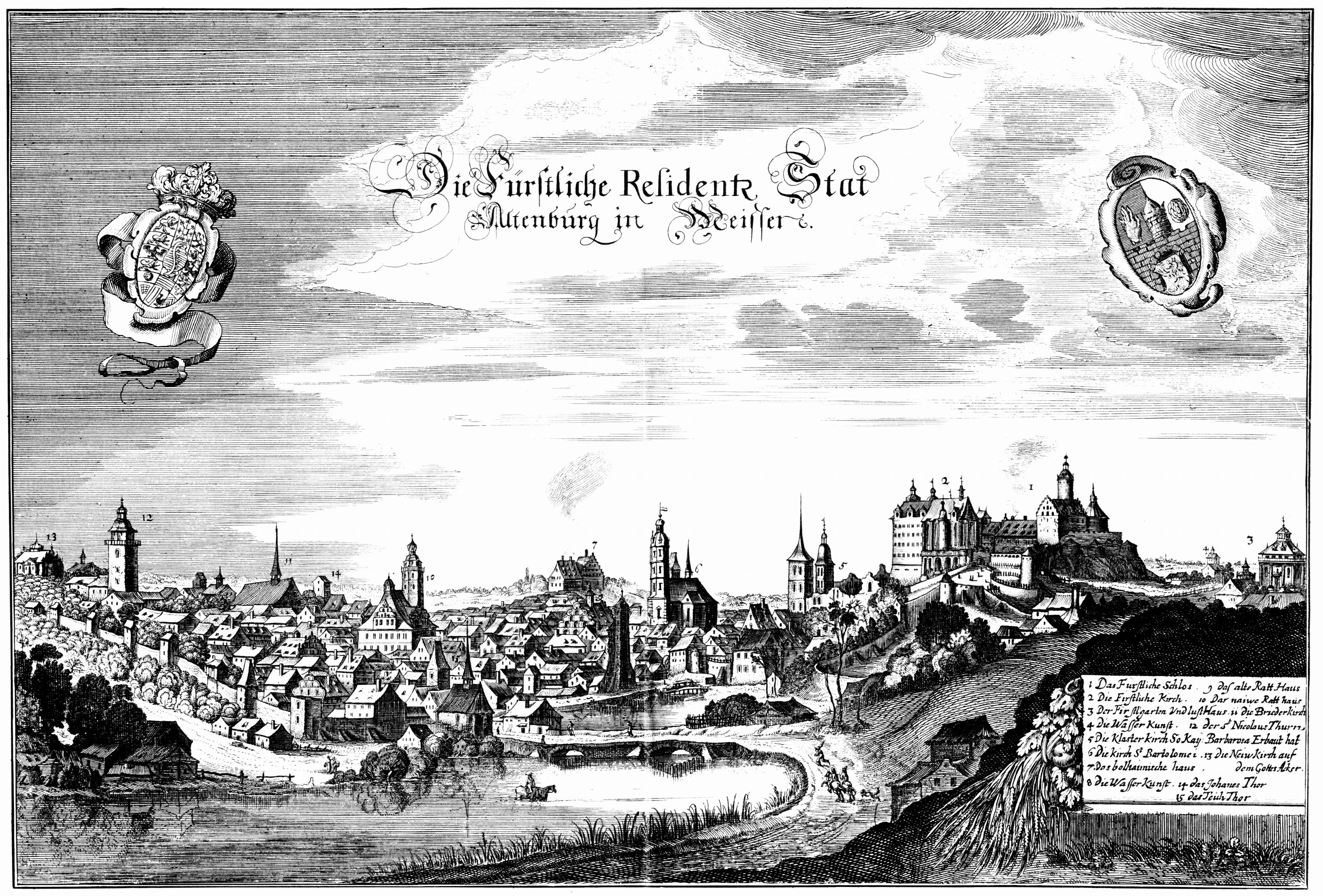
Altenburg about the year 1650

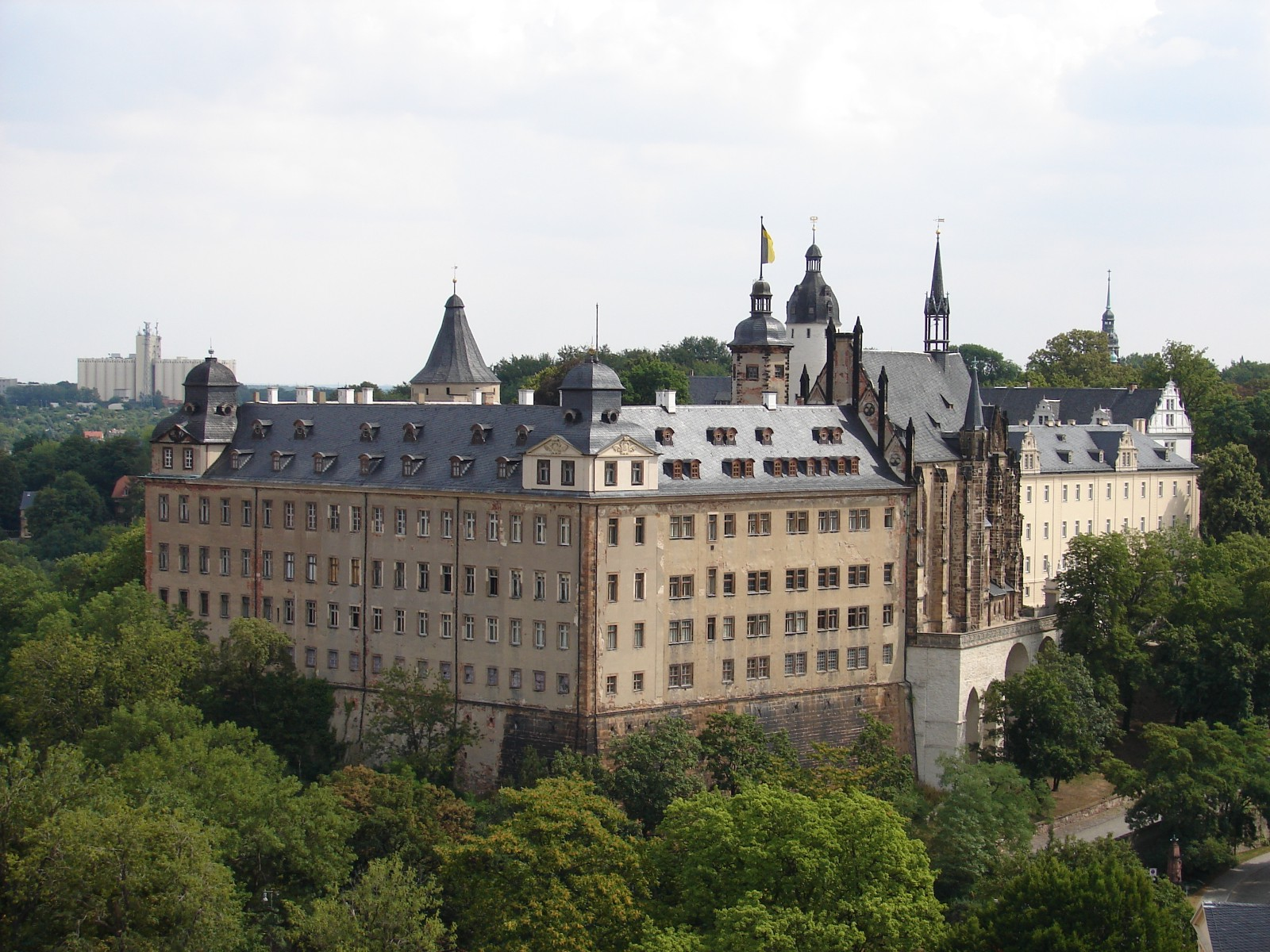
Castle of Altenburg

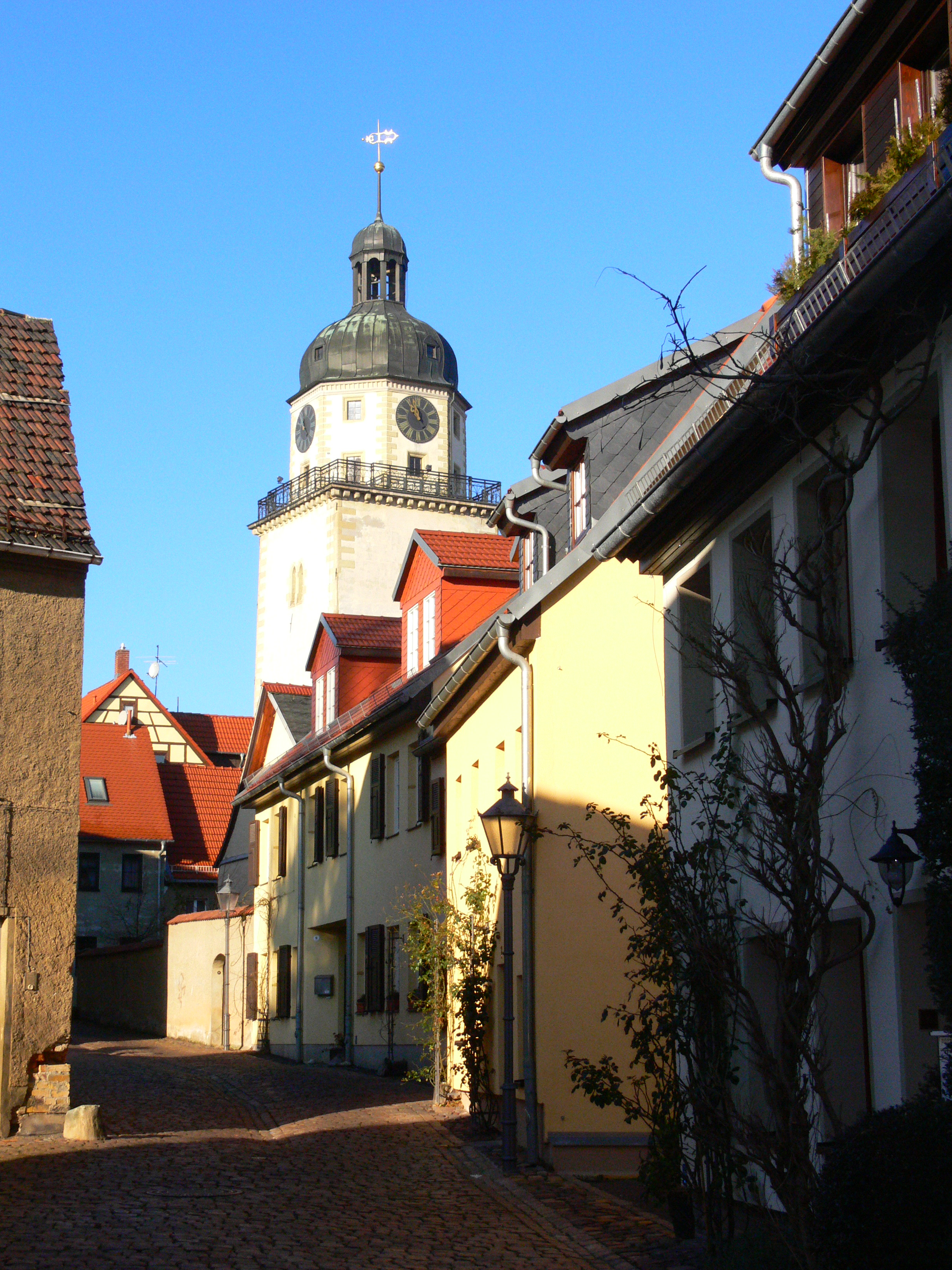
The Nikolai quarter is one of the oldest parts of Altenburg.

=== Middle Ages ===
The town (civitas Altenburg) was first mentioned in a deed to the Bishop of Zeitz in 976. Remains of a Slavic castle on the Schloßberg ("Castle Hill") demonstrate that the town was probably a Slavic foundation, the capital of the shire of Plisni, taken over during the conquest of Meissen by Henry I. As shown by placenames, the surrounding area (Osterland) was mainly settled by Slavs.

The town's location on the imperial road 'Via Imperii' between Halle and Cheb in Bohemia gave Altenburg economic importance in the salt trade.

The first castle, located under the present day church St. Bartholomäi, was destroyed after the Battle of Hohenmölsen between Henry IV and Rudolph of Swabia. It was rebuilt on the Schloßberg outside of the town. The 11th century Mantelturm tower is still preserved. The castle later became an imperial palatinate and played an important part in the German takeover and settlement of the area between the Harz-mountains and the Elbe.

In the middle of the 12th century, the Hohenstaufen emperors patronized Altenburg as one of their Kaiserpfalzes, allowing the town to become a market and a mint. Together with the Royal forests Leina, Pahna, Kammerforst and Luckauer Forst, lands of the Groitzsch family bought by Frederick Barbarossa, Altenburg, Colditz, Zwickau and Chemnitz were turned into the Terra Plisnensis. Altenburg and Chemnitz as Imperial towns were intended to reduce the importance of Leipzig held by the Margrave of Meissen. Under Frederick Barbarossa much building took place, especially in the market area, and the town grew rapidly. A priory of canons regular was founded and the parish church was finished in 1172. The twin towers of the 12th century Augustinian monastery (Rote Spitzen) are still preserved. A town wall with 5 gates was constructed at the end of the 12th century. Altenburg got its charter around 1200, in 1256 the Wettins confirmed it again. The law structure was transposed from Goslar municipal law.

During the Interregnum (1254-1273), the Terra Plisnensis was impounded, but bought back by Rudolph I of Germany, who desired the crown of Thuringia. Together with Zwickau and Chemnitz, Altenburg was part of the anti-Meissen Pleiße-city Union of 1290. After the Battle of Lucka in 1307 against Frederick the Brave of Meissen and his brother Diezmann, King Albert I lost Altenburg and the Pleiße-lands to the Wettin margraves of Meissen, who held the city until 1918.

In 1455, Altenburg saw the division (Altenburger Teilung) of the Meissen lands between Elector Frederick II (the Gentle) and Duke William that led, after a failed attempt at reconciliation (Hallescher Machtspruch) to a war (1446–1451) between the two brothers (Bruderkrieg). In the second division of the Wettin lands between Ernest and Albert at Leipzig in 1485, Altenburg fell to Ernest, together with the Electorate (Kurland), Grimma, the Mutschener Pflege, Leisnig, Thuringia and the Vogtland. From this time on, Altenburg was historically connected with Thuringia and its dynasty, the Ernestine Wettins.

=== Early modern period ===
The Reformation was introduced in Altenburg quite early, in 1522, by George Spalatin, Wenzeslaus Linck and Gabriel Zwilling. During the German Peasants' War of 1525, the Altenburg Augustinian monastery was attacked. In the summer, four peasant rebels were executed at the marketplace. After the Schmalkaldic War brought defeat for the Ernestines, Altenburg belonged to the Albertines for short time (1547–1554) before coming back to the Ernestines after the Naumburg Treaty.

From 1603 to 1672, Altenburg was the residence of an Ernestine line, after that, it fell to Saxe-Gotha-Altenburg. The Thirty Years' War brought heavy damage to the city and more than half of the population died.

From 1705 onwards, the Magdalenenstift was a Protestant boarding school for young noble ladies.

During the Napoleonic Wars it was a scene of a brief Allied raid by the Saxon General Johann von Thielmann.

=== Since 1815 ===
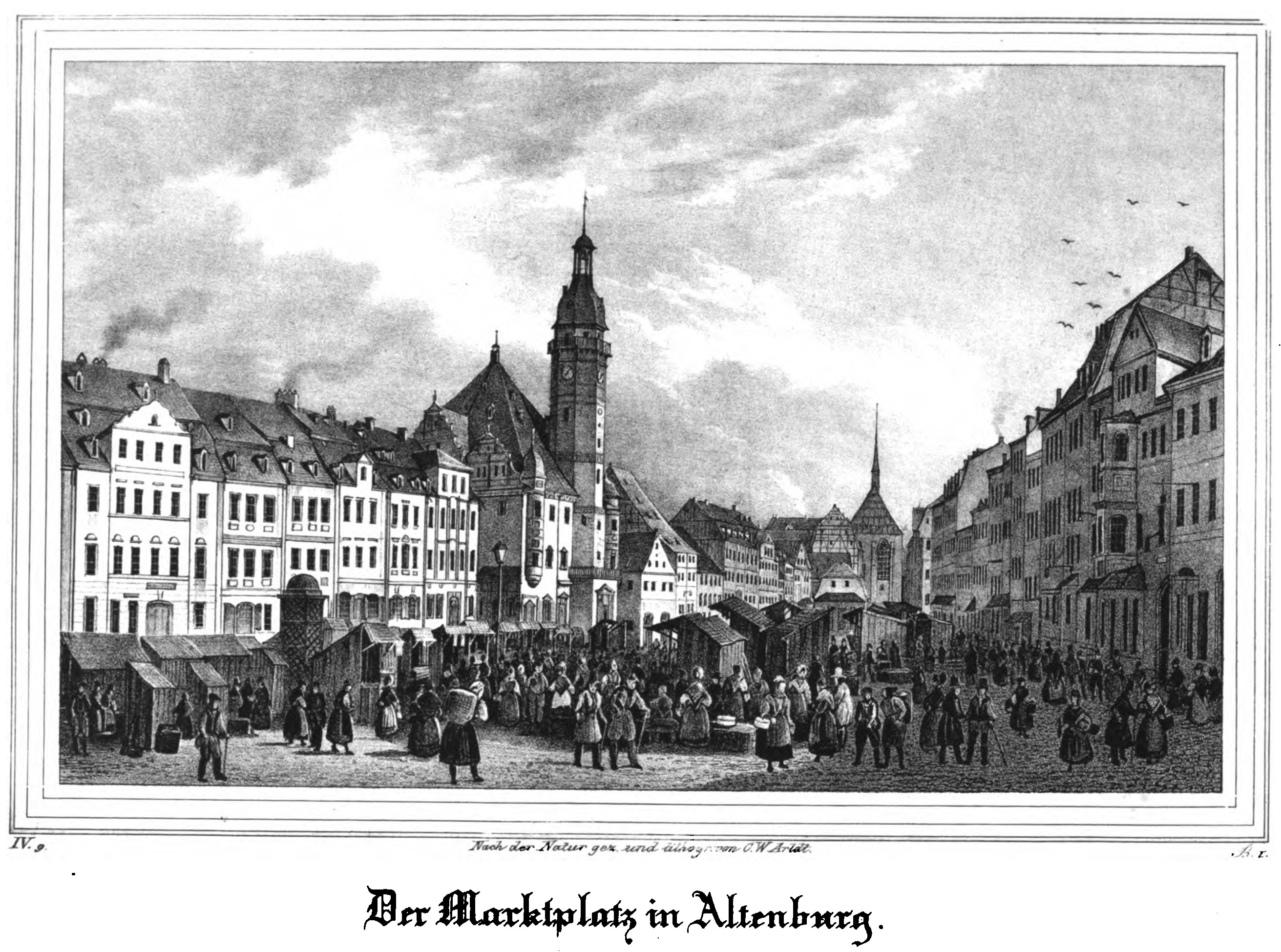
Market square in 1839

When the Ernestine lands were re-divided in 1826, Altenburg became the capital of Saxe-Altenburg, successor state to the dissolved Saxe-Hildburghausen. Around 1830, the city walls and gates were knocked down and the old suburbia in front of the former wall were incorporated. Industrialization began around this time and the economy and population both saw rapid growth, strengthened by the connection to the railway in 1842 (as Thuringia's first connected city). The Revolution of 1848 led to the abdication of the conservative duke Joseph, who was replaced by his more liberal brother George. The last duke, Ernst II, abdicated during the Revolution of 1918 on 13 November 1918. He was later granted 12 million Marks and a large hunting lodge in Trokenborn-Wolfersdorf as a settlement for the loss of his land and property. The post-revolution Free State of Saxe-Altenburg became part of the new State of Thuringia when it was formed in 1920.

Altenburg was a working-class city during the Weimar Republic, ruled by SPD and KPD, which led to heavy conflicts between left- and right-wing forces after 1933. The Jewish community was destroyed during the Kristallnacht in 1938, many Jews emigrated or were killed in the concentration camps. Furthermore, communists and invalids from Altenburg were murdered. During World War II, several subcamps of the Buchenwald concentration camp were located here. They provided 13,000 forced labourers for HASAG, the third largest German company to use concentration camp labour. The US Army reached Altenburg on 15 April 1945 and was replaced by the Soviet Army on 1 July 1945.

In 1952, Thuringia was dissolved and replaced by administrative divisions of East Germany (Bezirks). Altenburg became part of the Leipzig administrative district, in which it was the second largest city. After reunification, previously extant states were re-established in the former east Germany as federal states in the reunified Germany. Although a majority of 54% in the district voted for Saxony in a plebiscite, the district council decided to join Thuringia together with the Schmölln district, partly because a vast majority of 80% in the neighboring Schmölln district had voted for Thuringia. These districts had formed the eastern part of Saxe-Altenburg until 1920 and were reunified as the modern-day Altenburger Land district in 1994.

== Geography and demographics ==
=== Topography ===
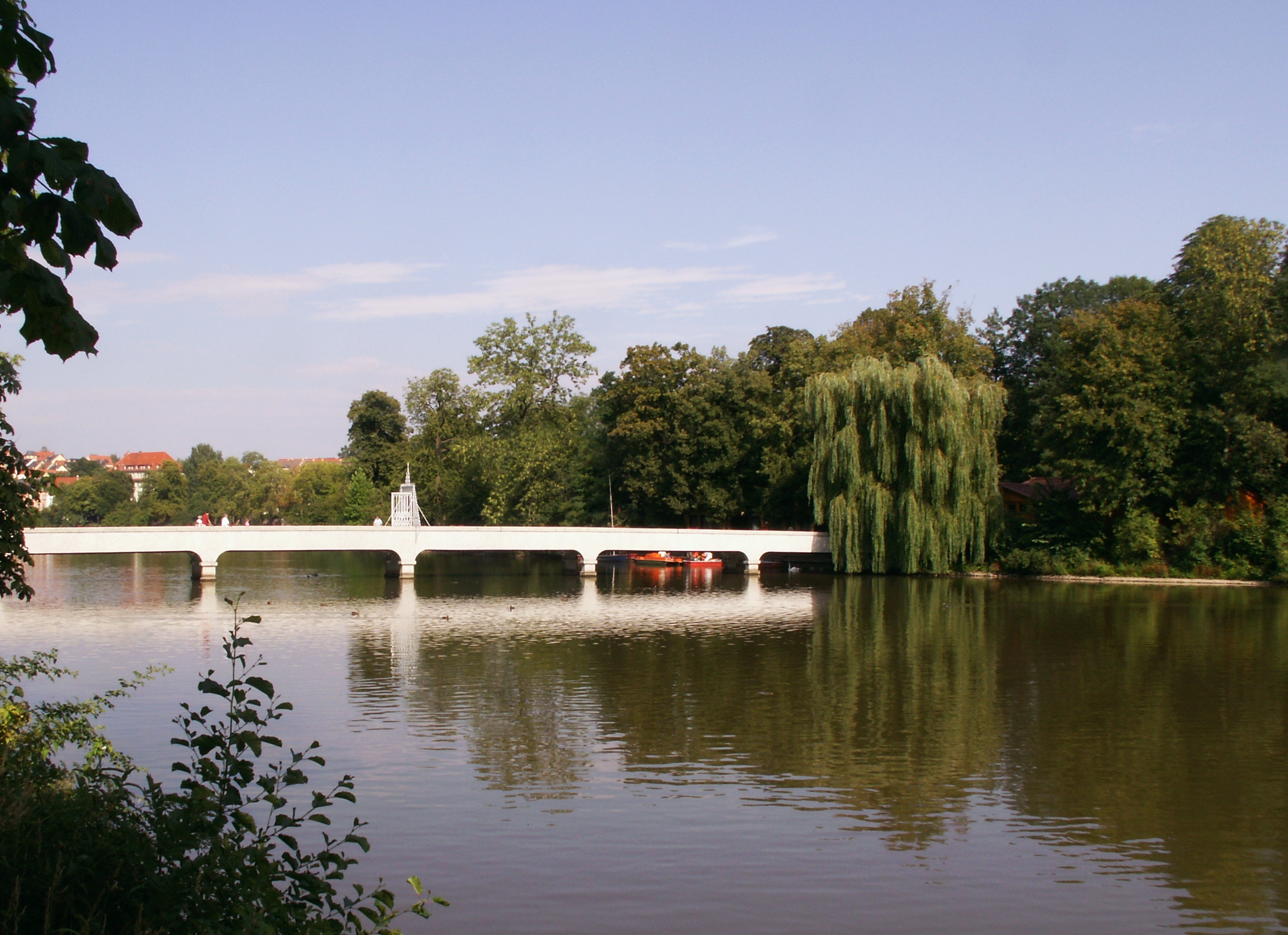
"Großer Teich", bridge to island with the Zoological Gardens

Altenburg is located on the southern edge of the Leipzig Bay, a flat and fertile area, with intensive agricultural use and lignite surface mining 10 km (6 mi) north of the town. The nearest mountains are the Ore Mountains approximately 50 km (31 mi) to the south-east. The Pleiße valley runs east of the city, whereas the center itself is located at Blaue Flut (blue flood) river, a small tributary of Pleiße river. The Blaue Flut feeds the Großer Teich (big pond), an inner-city pond with an island in the middle, on which the Altenburg zoo is located. There is relatively little forest within the town's municipal territory: the small Stadtwald (town wood) and Herzog-Ernst-Wald (Duke Ernest wood) south of the center and the Fasanerieholz (Pheasantry wood) at Ehrenberg district. The elevation of the city center is 200 m, to the north it declines down to 162 m and in the south next to Mockzig district it rises up to 261 m.

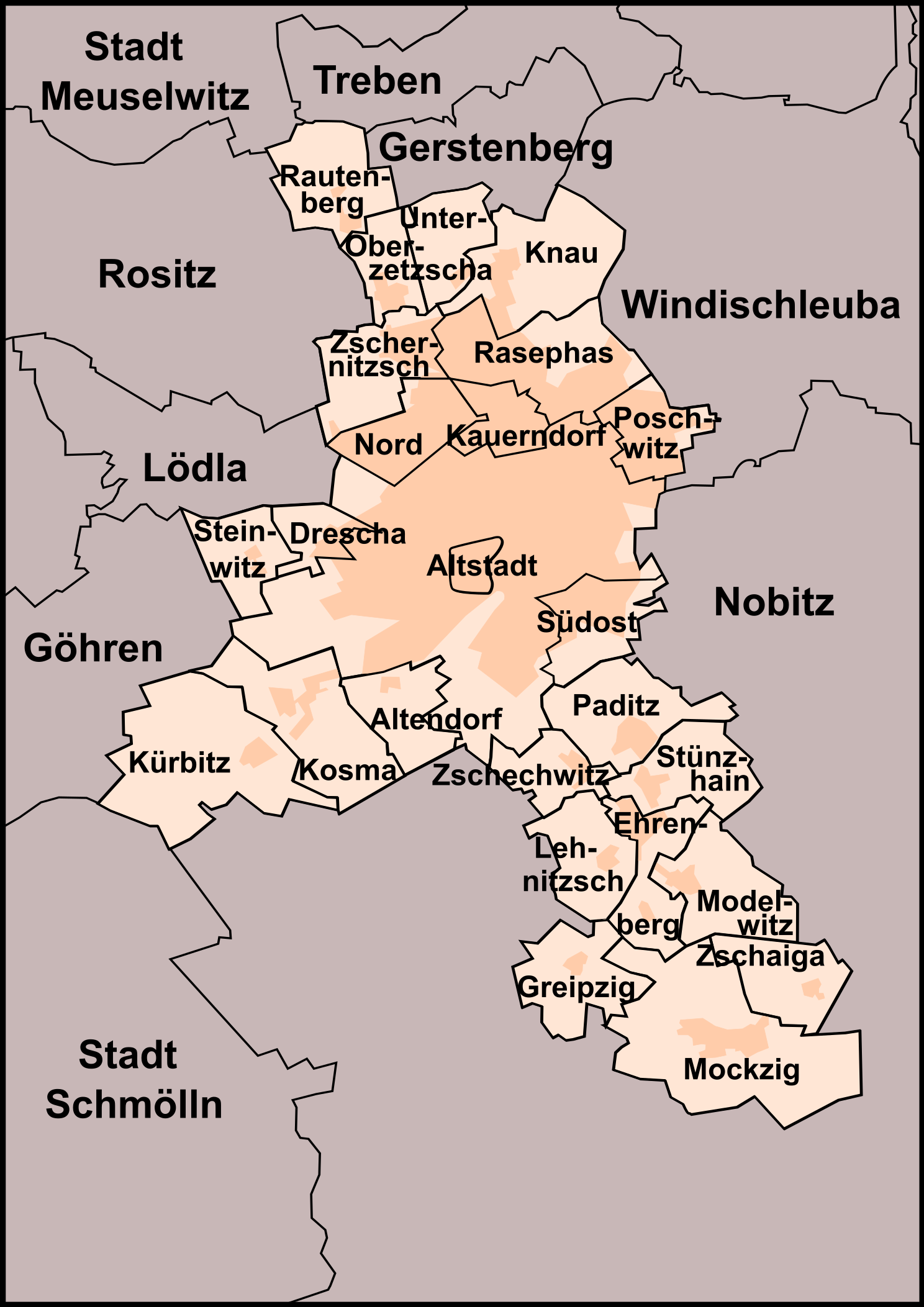
District map

=== Administrative division ===
Altenburg is bounded by Windischleuba, Nobitz, Altkirchen, Göhren, Lödla, Rositz, Meuselwitz, Treben and Gerstenberg.

Because of the quite densely settlement of the region, many small villages and ancient former suburbs are situated within the municipal territory, which is officially divided into 4 districts:

- Altenburg (including the villages Drescha, Kauerndorf, Poschwitz, Rasephas, Steinwitz and Zschernitzsch)
- Ehrenberg, incorporated in 1993 (with Greipzig, Lehnitzsch, Mockzig, Modelwitz, Paditz, Stünzhain, Zschaiga and Zschechwitz)
- Kosma, incorporated in 1996 (with Altendorf and Kürbitz)
- Zetzscha, incorporated in 1994 (with Knau, Oberzetzscha, Rautenberg and Unterzetzscha)

For a detailed view of Altenburg's administrative division, see the list in German Wikipedia.

=== Demographics ===
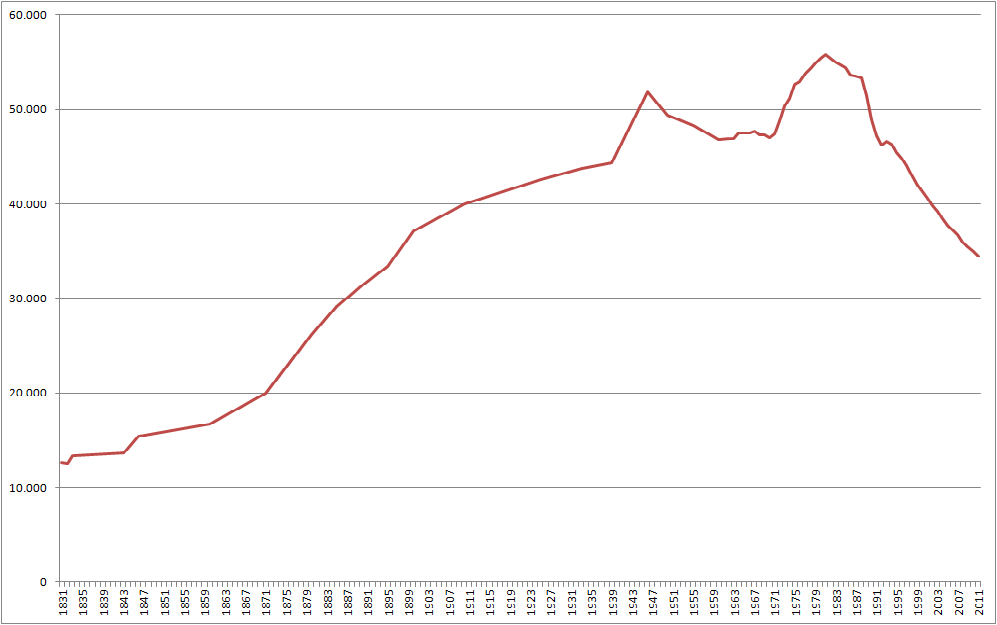
Evolution of population between 1831 and 2011

Altenburg has been a relatively big town (compared to others in the wider region) down the centuries, because of its importance as a Kaiserpfalz and later as a ducal residence. During the Middle Ages, it had a population of 3,000 to 4,000 inhabitants, rising to 6,000 around 1700, 10,000 around 1800 and 20,000 around 1870, making it Thuringia's second-largest city after Erfurt for a short time in the mid-19th century. The population grew further to 40,000 in 1910, 44,000 in 1940 and peaked at about 56,000 around 1980 before starting to decline. In 1988, before reunification, Altenburg had 53,000 inhabitants, shrinking to 41,000 by 2000 and 33,000 in 2012. With a decline of nearly 40% since 1988, Altenburg is among the most rapidly declining urban areas in Germany.

The average decrease of population between 2009 and 2012 was approximately 1.27% p.a., whereas the population in bordering rural regions is shrinking with accelerating tendency. Suburbanization played only a small role in Altenburg. It occurred after the reunification for a short time in the 1990s, but most of the suburban areas were situated within the administrative city borders, others are Windischleuba and Nobitz. During the 1990s and the 2000s, many inhabitants left Altenburg to search a better life in western Germany or other major east German cities like Leipzig, Dresden or Jena. The birth deficit, caused by the high average age of the population, is becoming a bigger problem because there is no immigration to compensate it. Despite urban planning activities to tear down unused flats, vacancy is still a problem with rates around 16% (according to 2011 EU census), which is the largest amount among Thuringia's major towns. A positive side effect for the inhabitants is that Altenburg has one of the lowest rent levels in Germany.

The birth deficit was 282 in 2012, this is -8.5 per 1,000 inhabitants (Thuringian average: -4.5; national average: -2.4). The net migration rate was -1.7 per 1,000 inhabitants in 2012 (Thuringian average: -0.8; national average: +4.6). The most important target regions of Altenburg migrants are the large cities around like Leipzig, Dresden, Halle, Jena and Erfurt, as well as the western German conurbations.

Like most other small to middling eastern German towns, Altenburg has only a small amount of foreign population: circa 1.7% are non-Germans by citizenship and overall 1.6% are migrants (according to 2011 EU census). Differing from the national average, the biggest groups of migrants in Altenburg are Russians and Vietnamese people. During recent years, the economic situation of the city has improved a bit: the unemployment rate in the district declined from 24% in 2005 to 10% in 2013 with little bit higher rates in the city than in the other municipalities of the Altenburger Land district. Nevertheless, this is still one of the highest rates in Thuringia.

Partly due to official atheism in former GDR, most of the population is non-religious. 12.1% are members of the Evangelical Church in Central Germany and 2.5% are Catholics (according to 2011 EU census).

1831 – 1950	1951 – 2000	2001 – 2017
1831 – 12,629; 1880 – 26,241; 1885 – 29,110; 1890 – 31,439; 1900 – 37,110; 1925 – 42,570; 1933 – 43,736; 1939 – 45,851; 1946 – 51,805 (Note: 29 October); 1950 – 49,413 (Note: 31 August)	1955 – 48.281; 1960 – 46,791; 1981 – 55,827; 1984 – 54,755; 1994 – 46,291; 1995 – 45,472; 1996 – 44,854; 1997 – 44,060; 1998 – 43,032; 1999 – 42,005; 2000 – 41,290	2001 – 40,559; 2002 – 39,810; 2003 – 39,189; 2004 – 38,417; 2013 – 32,992; 2014 – 32,819; 2015 – 32,910; 2016 – 32,788; 2017 – 32,374

Source (since 1994): Thüringer Landesamt für Statistik

== Culture, sights and cityscape ==
=== Culture ===
Altenburg is nicknamed playing cards town. The game of skat is said to have originated here, based on the Bavarian tarock. Because of the influence Emperor Frederick Barbarossa had on the town, it is nicknamed a "Barbarossa town".

=== Museums ===
There are some museums in Altenburg:

- The Schloss- und Spielkartenmuseum (castle and playing card museum) inside the castle hosts an exhibition about Altenburg as a ducal residence, and a historical playing cards collection.
- The Lindenau-Museum (established in 1876) shows Bernhard von Lindenau's art collection including Italian paintings of the 13th–15th centuries, a collection of classical antiquities and cast and modern art.
- The Mauritianum (opened in 1908) is Altenburg's museum of natural history with the largest well-known mummified rat king, which was found in 1828 in a miller's fireplace at Buchheim.
- The Brauereimuseum inside the Altenburger brewery shows an exhibition about beer and its history with a local focus.
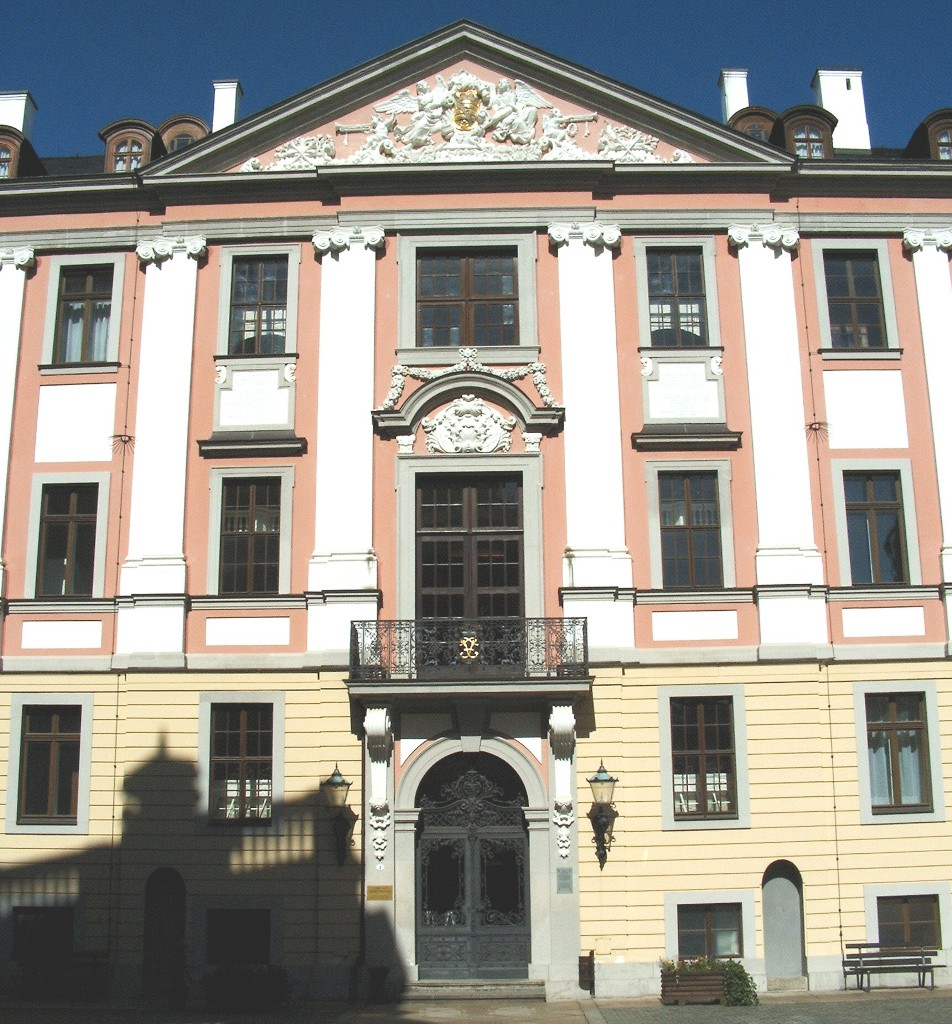
Schloss- und Spielkartenmuseum inside the castle

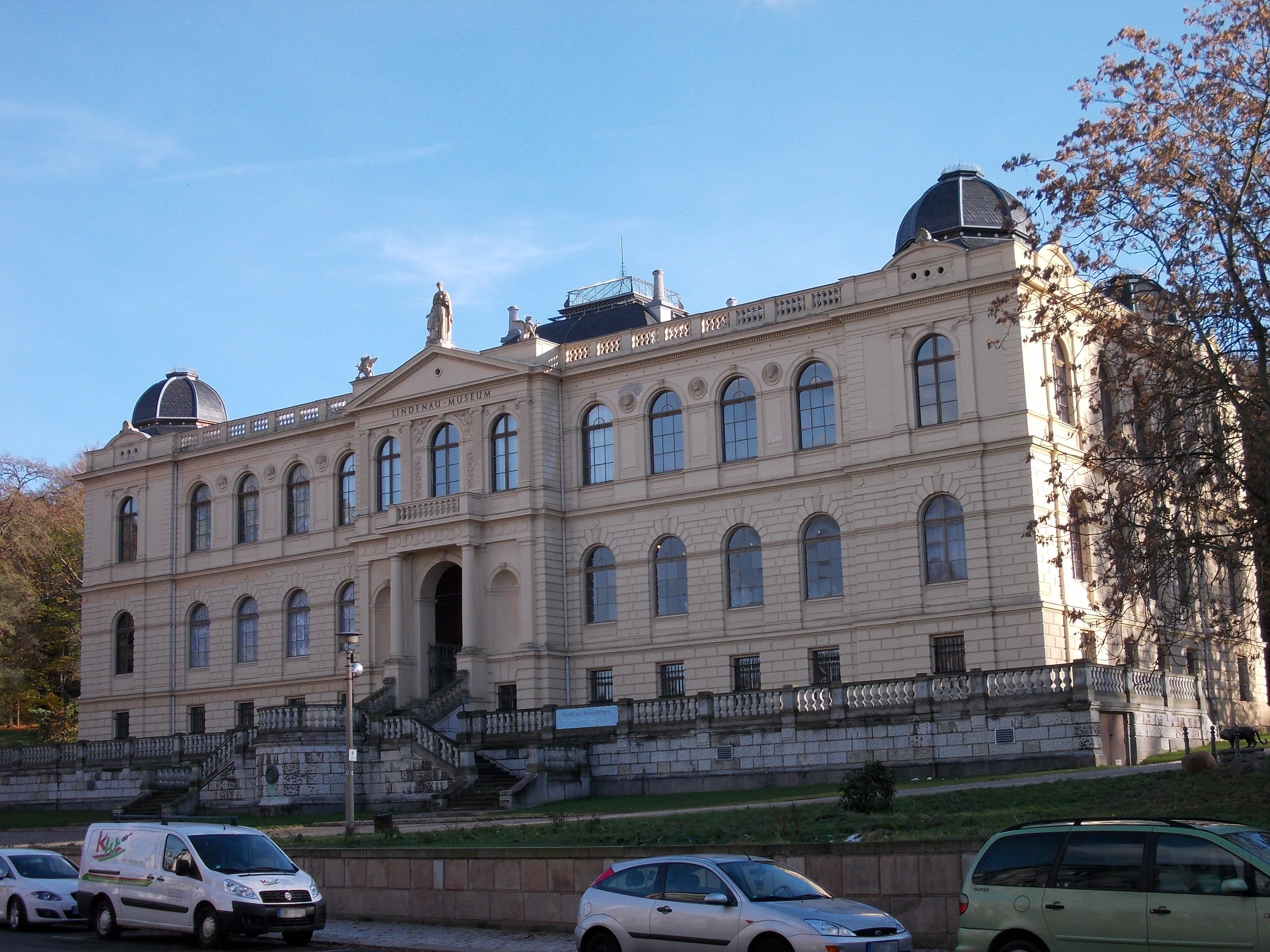
Lindenau-Museum

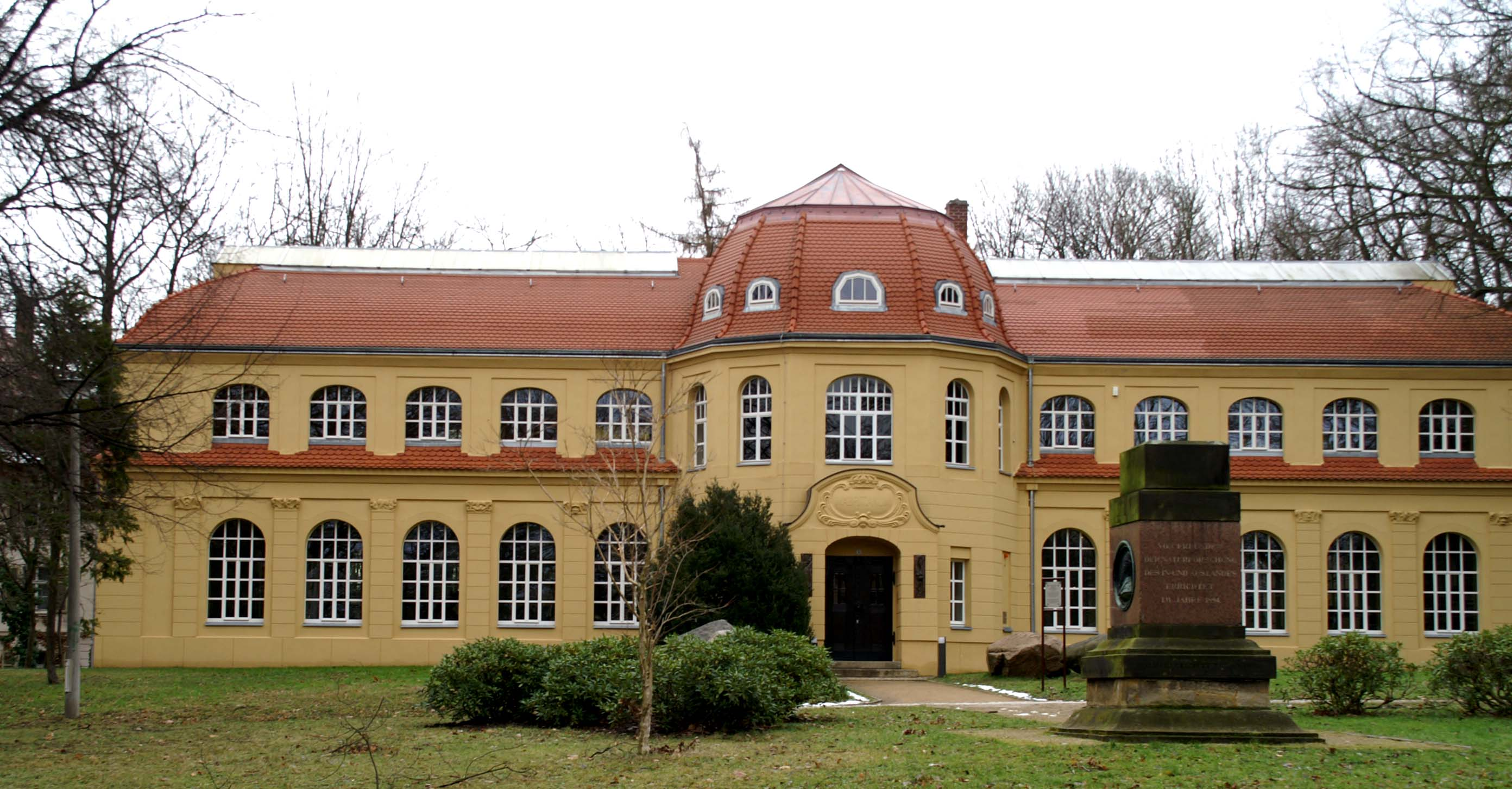
Mauritianum

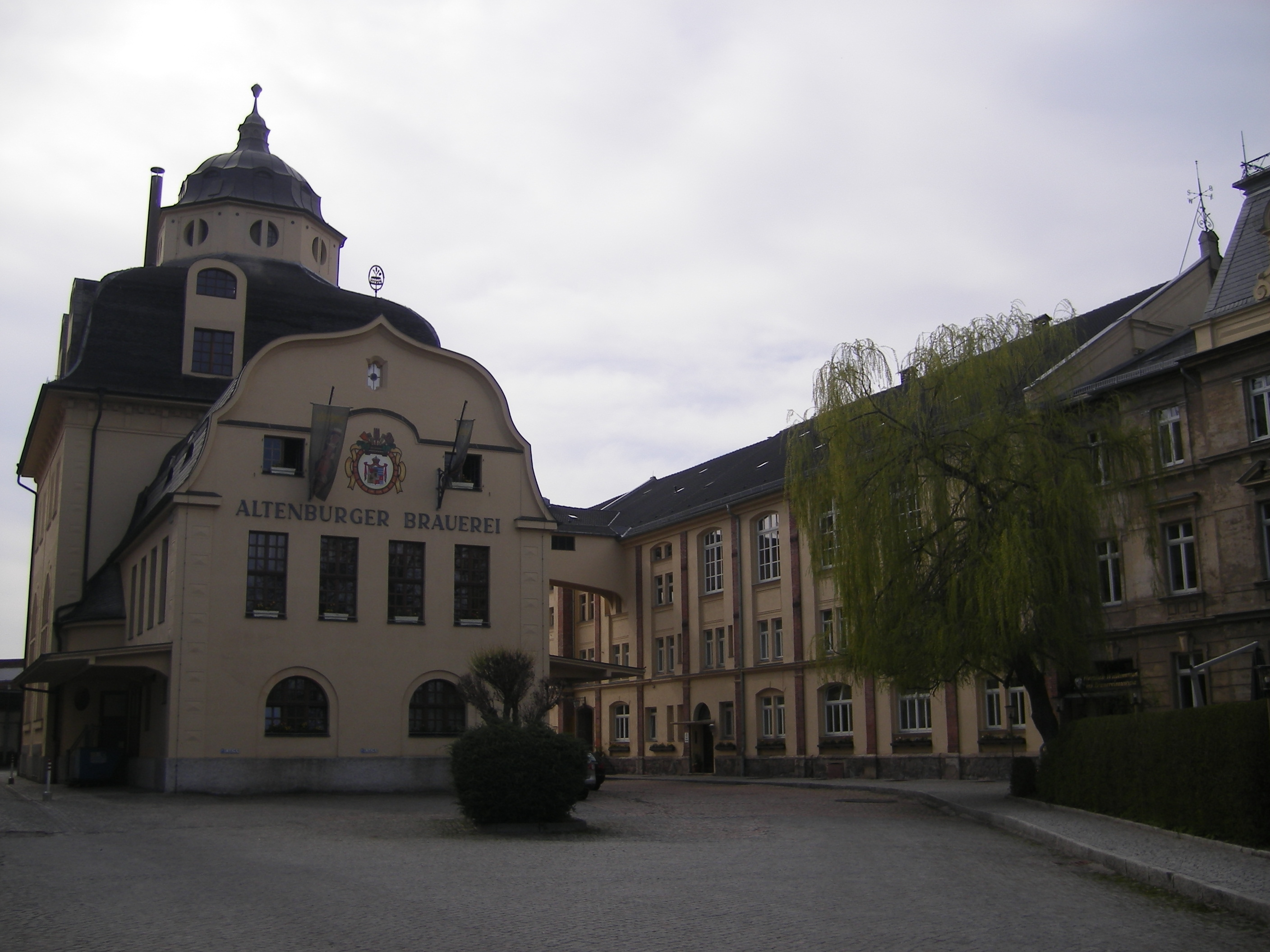
Altenburg brewery

=== Old town ===
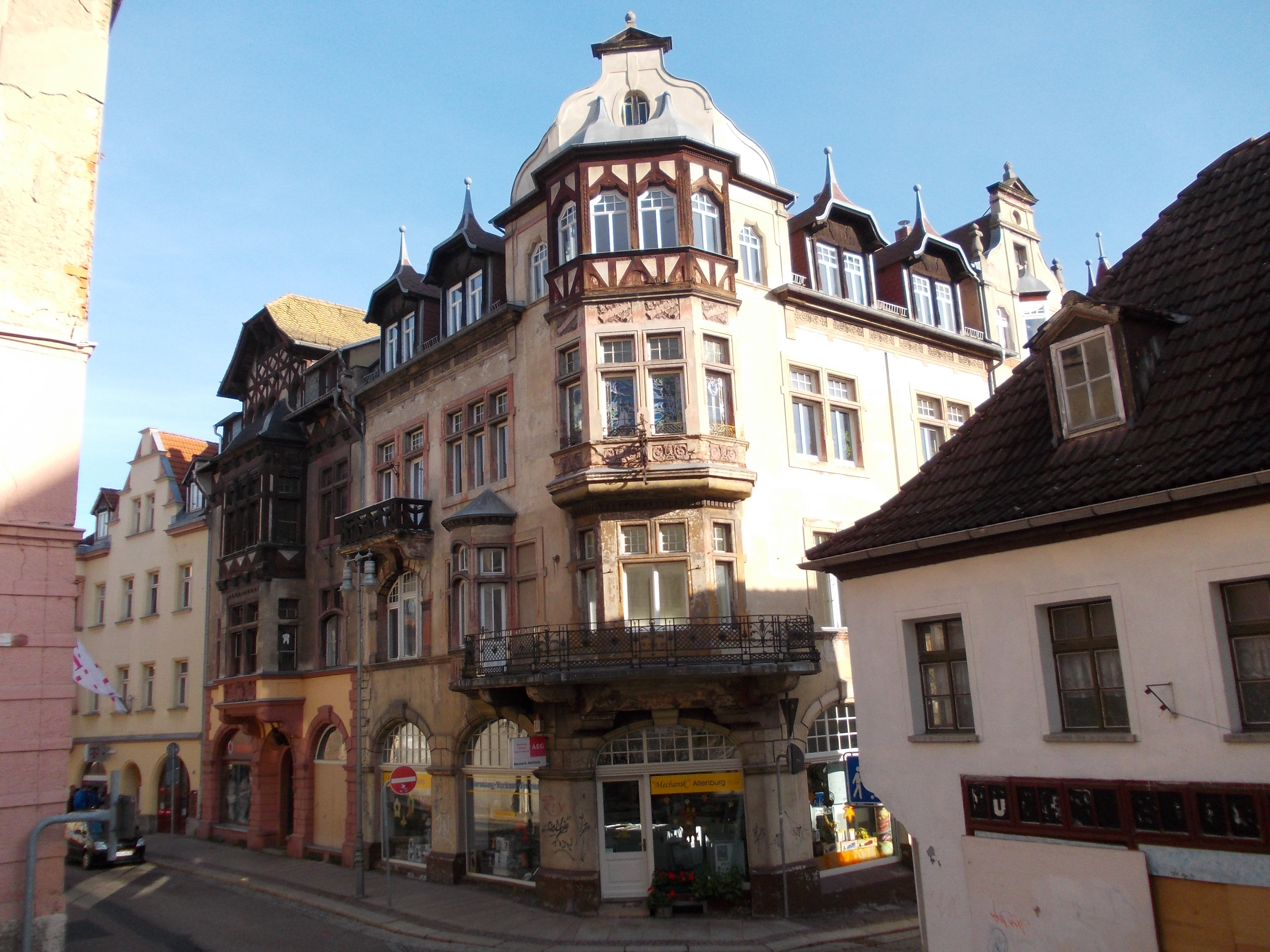
Some Gründerzeit architecture at Wallstraße

The town center of Altenburg within the former wall has a planned grid of 12th/13th century origin, whereas the two old settlement cores were located around Brühl in the north-east and around St. Nicholas' Church in the south-west. The area around the castle and southward on the eastern bank of Blaue Flut river has also been urban since the Middle Ages, nevertheless, it was located outside the city walls.

During the 19th and early 20th century, Altenburg saw a construction boom and the town enlarged to all directions, particularly north and east towards the new railway station (opened in 1878). Its time as a state capital until 1918 led to many interesting public and private buildings in Gründerzeit style, same as in other historist styles. Later, the town lost some of its importance and became a simple district capital in Thuringia. World War II left Altenburg unscathed, so all historic buildings are preserved. Nevertheless, the buildings' maintenance was neglected during the East German period, instead, some big Plattenbau settlements were set up on the northern and south-eastern periphery of Altenburg.

After reunification, most of the main sights and historic buildings were refurbished. On the other hand, the city lost much of its population which led to a very high vacancy rate, especially in the old inner-city buildings, which today endangers the historic city structure because of many vacant old private houses.

=== Sights and architectural heritage ===
==== Churches ====
- St. Bartholomew's Church, built between 1428 and 1443 in Gothic style at Burgstraße, is Altenburg's main evangelical parish church.
- The Fraternity Church at Marktplatz is another evangelical parish church, founded as a Franciscan monastery during the 12th century. It was abandoned after the Reformation in 1529 and reused as evangelical church. Today's building was established in 1905 in Neo-Gothic style.
- St. Nicholas' Church at Nikolaikirchhof was the first church of Altenburg, mentioned in 1140. It was demolished during the 16th century, only the steeple remains.
- St. George's Chapel is the castle's church, built in picturesque Gothic style during the mid-15th century.
- St. Mary's Monastery (Augustinians) is a former monastery on a hill east of the center. It was founded during the 12th century and abandoned in 1543. Only the two Romanesque towers and some walls remain, being the city's landmark called "Rote Spitzen" (red spires).
- The Duchess Agnes Memorial Church at Hausweg is an evangelical church, built between 1903 and 1906 in historist style.
- The Cemetery Church at Hospitalplatz was built between 1639 and 1651 in Renaissance style.
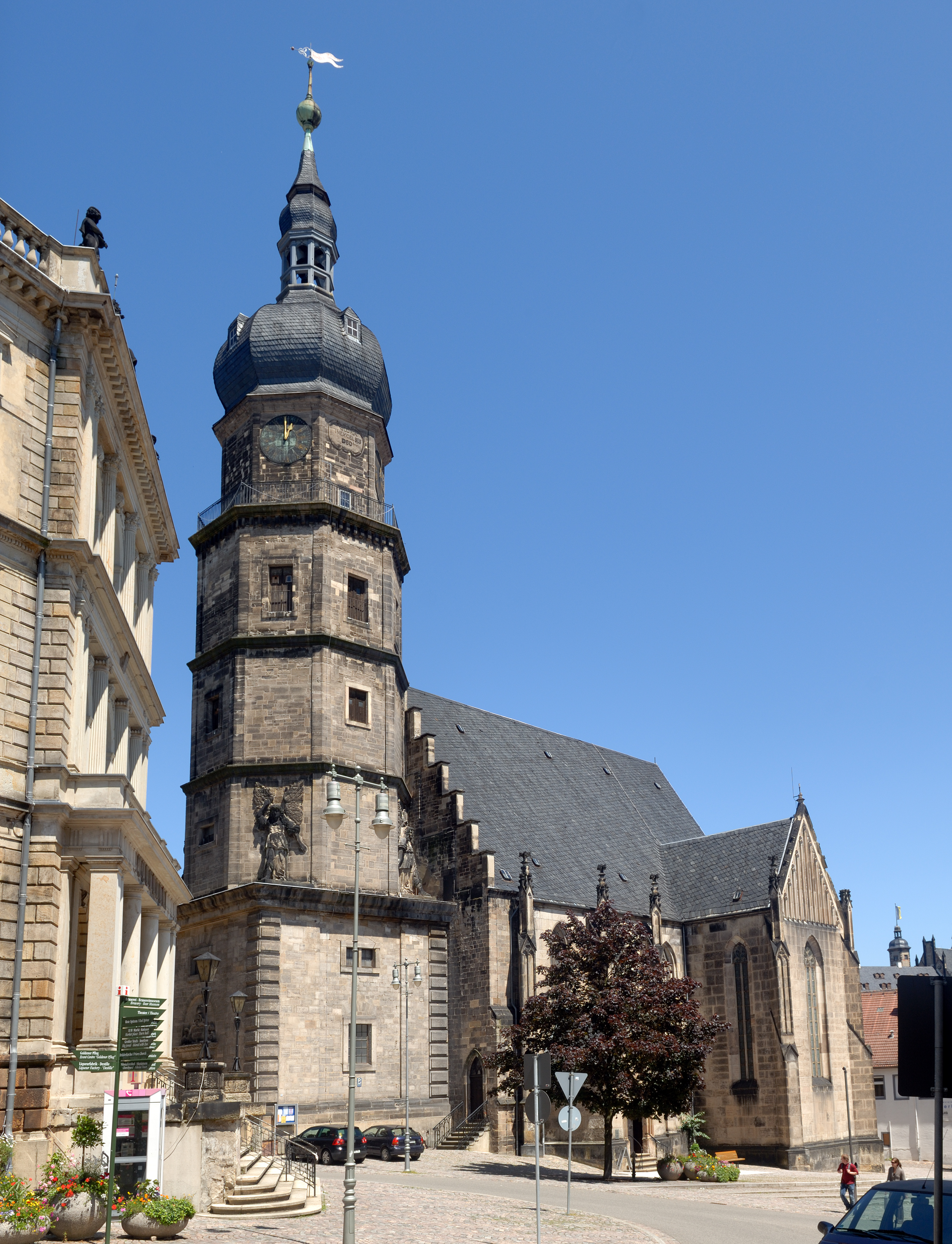
St. Bartholomew's Church

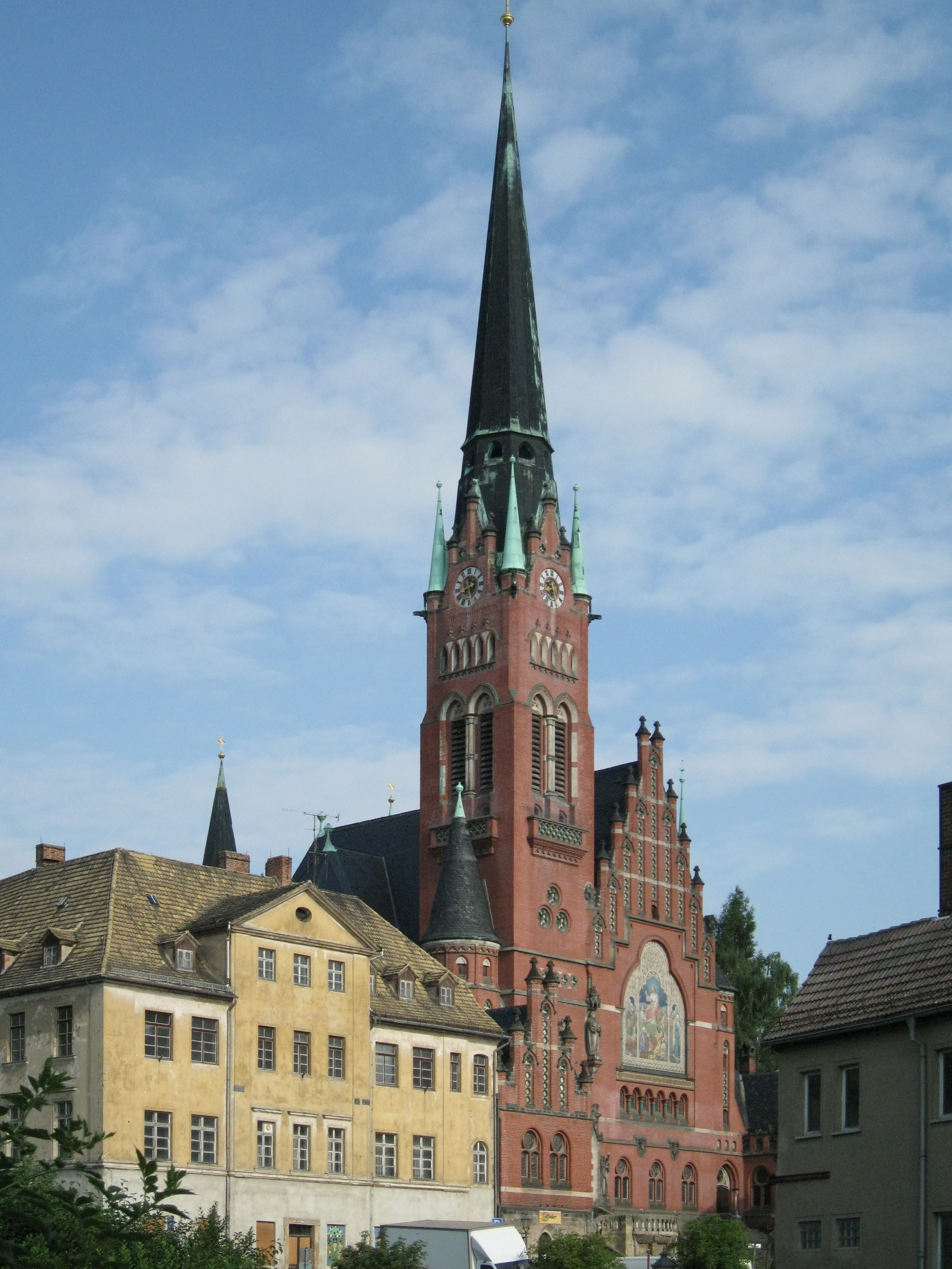
Fraternity Church

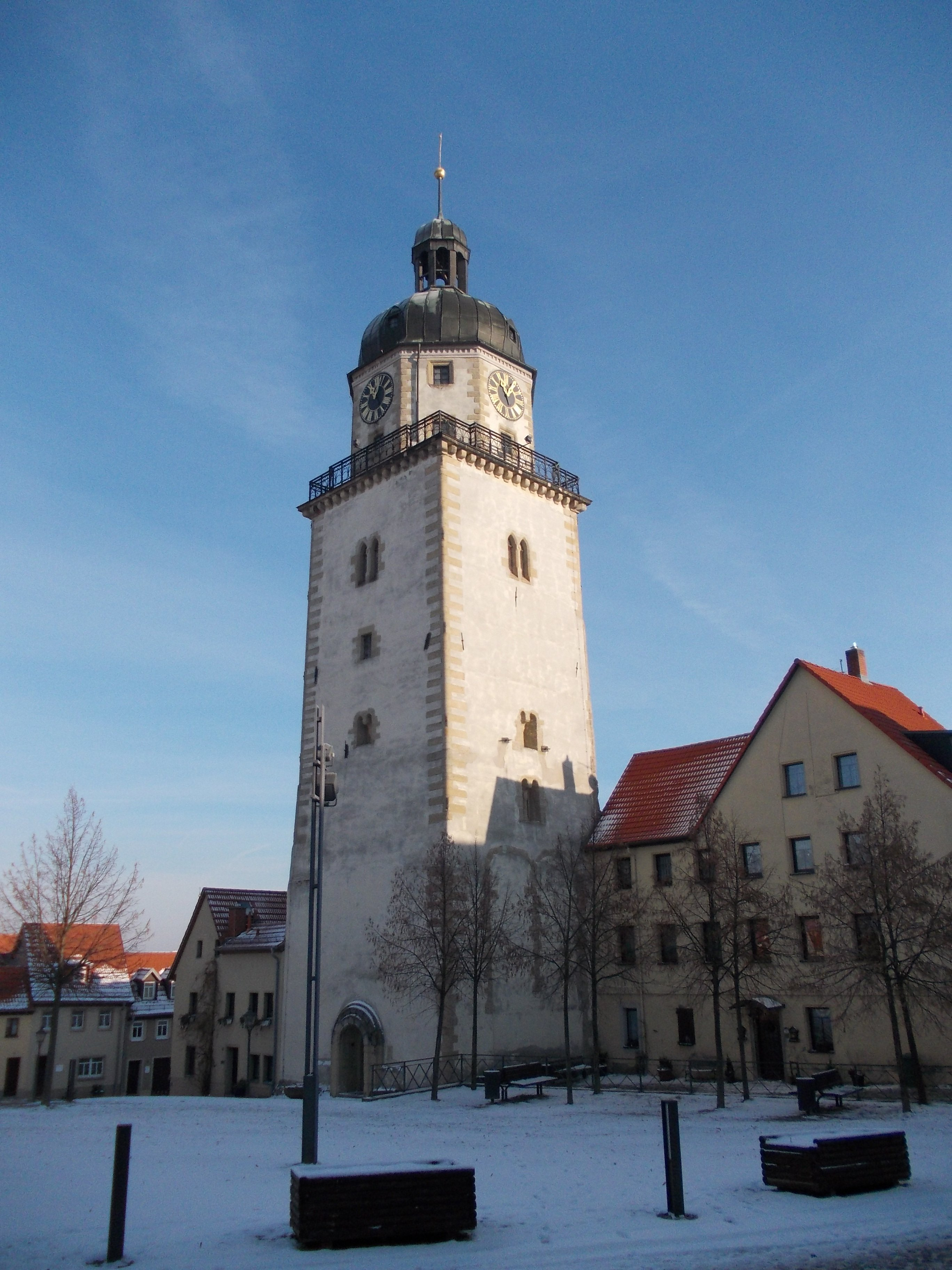
St. Nicholas' Steeple

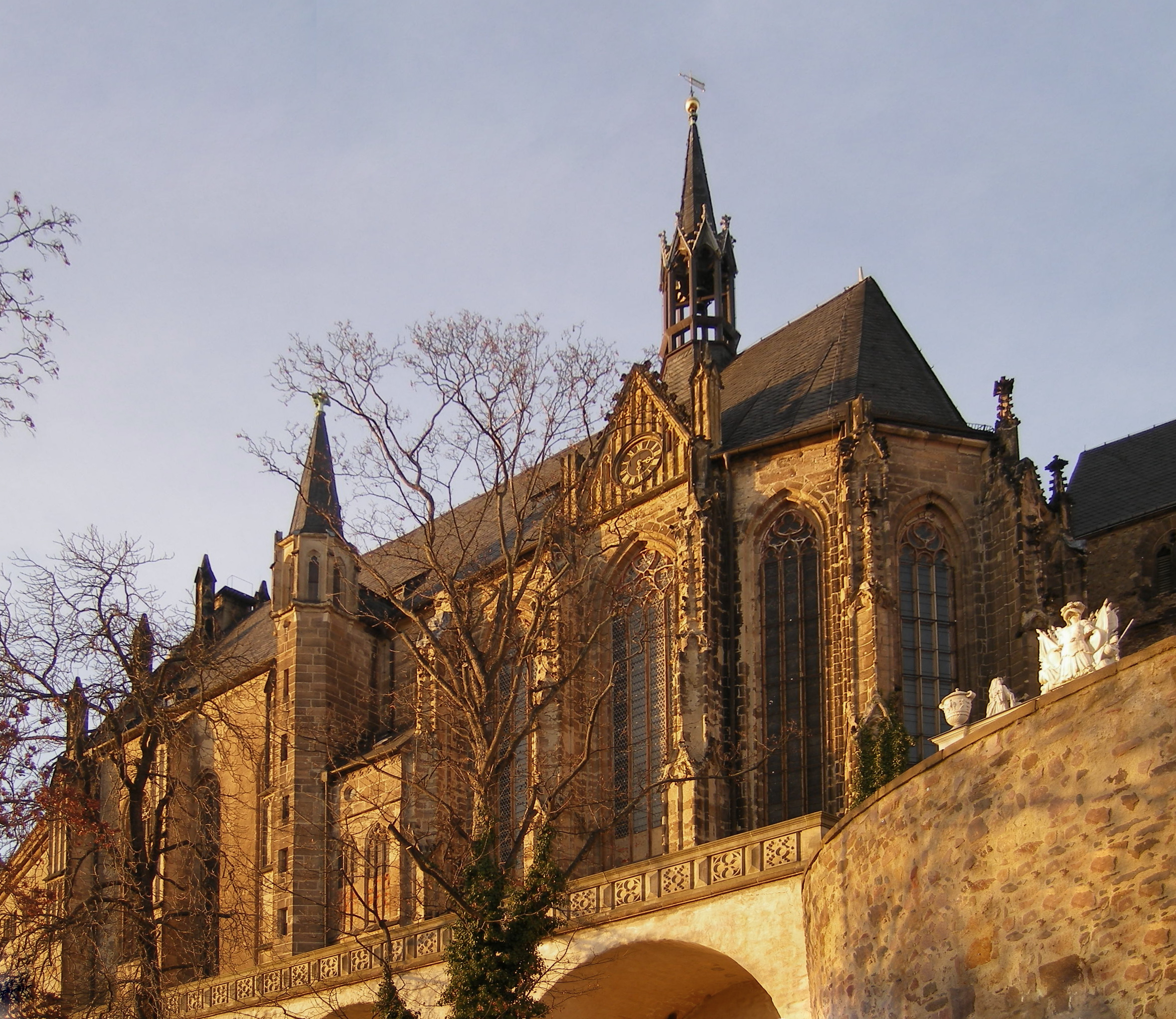
St. George's Chapel at the castle

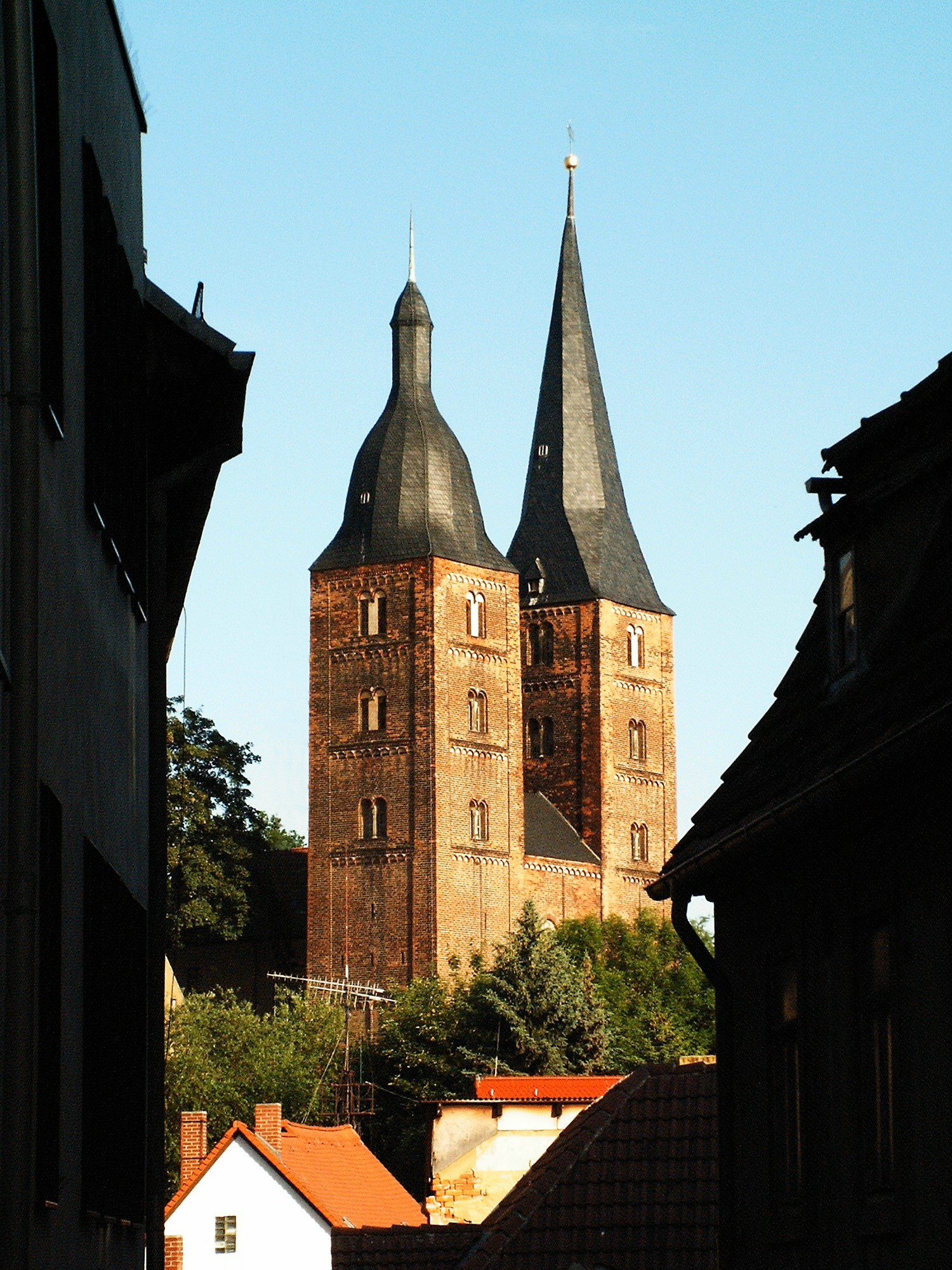
Rote Spitzen

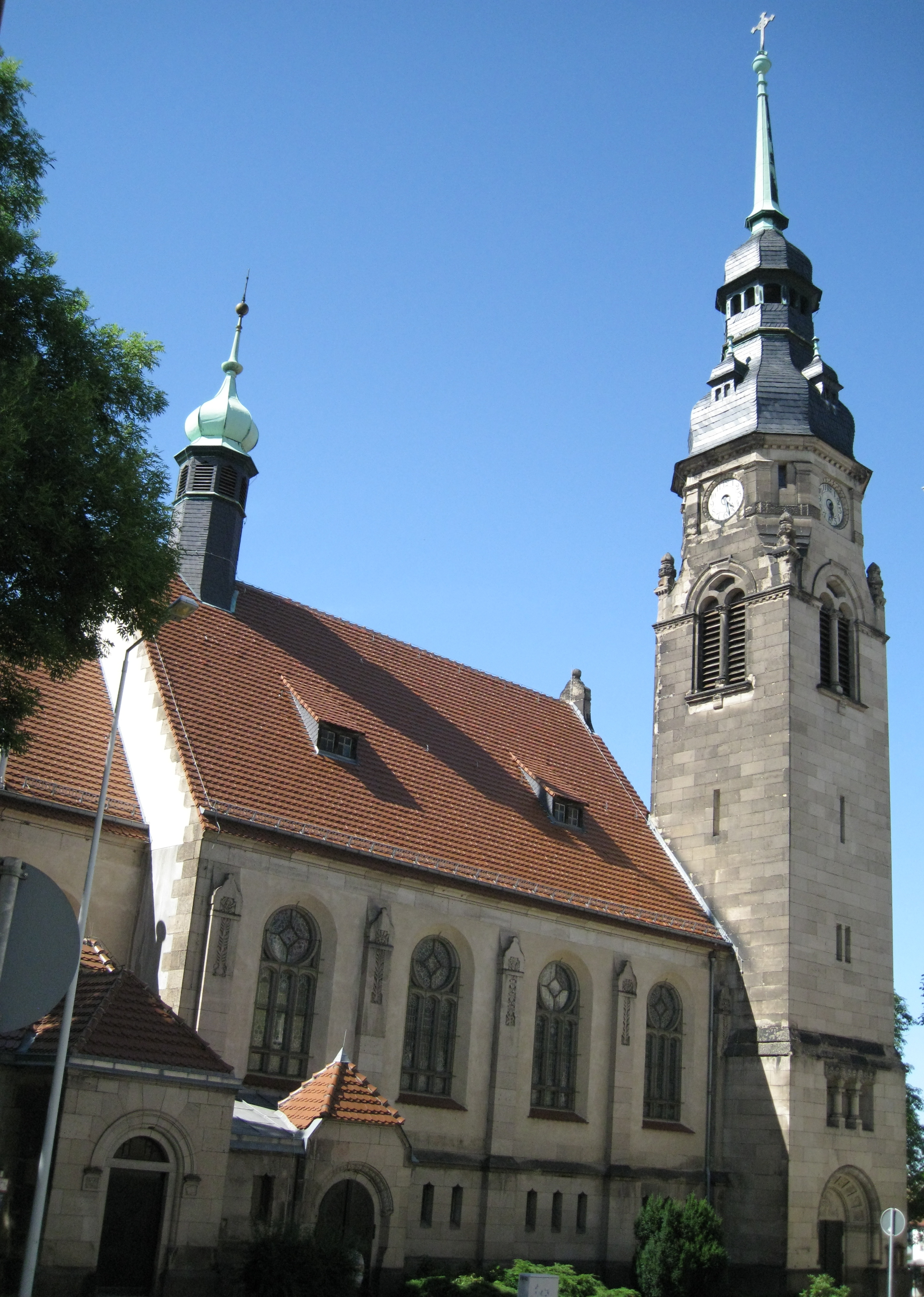
Duchess Agnes Memorial Church

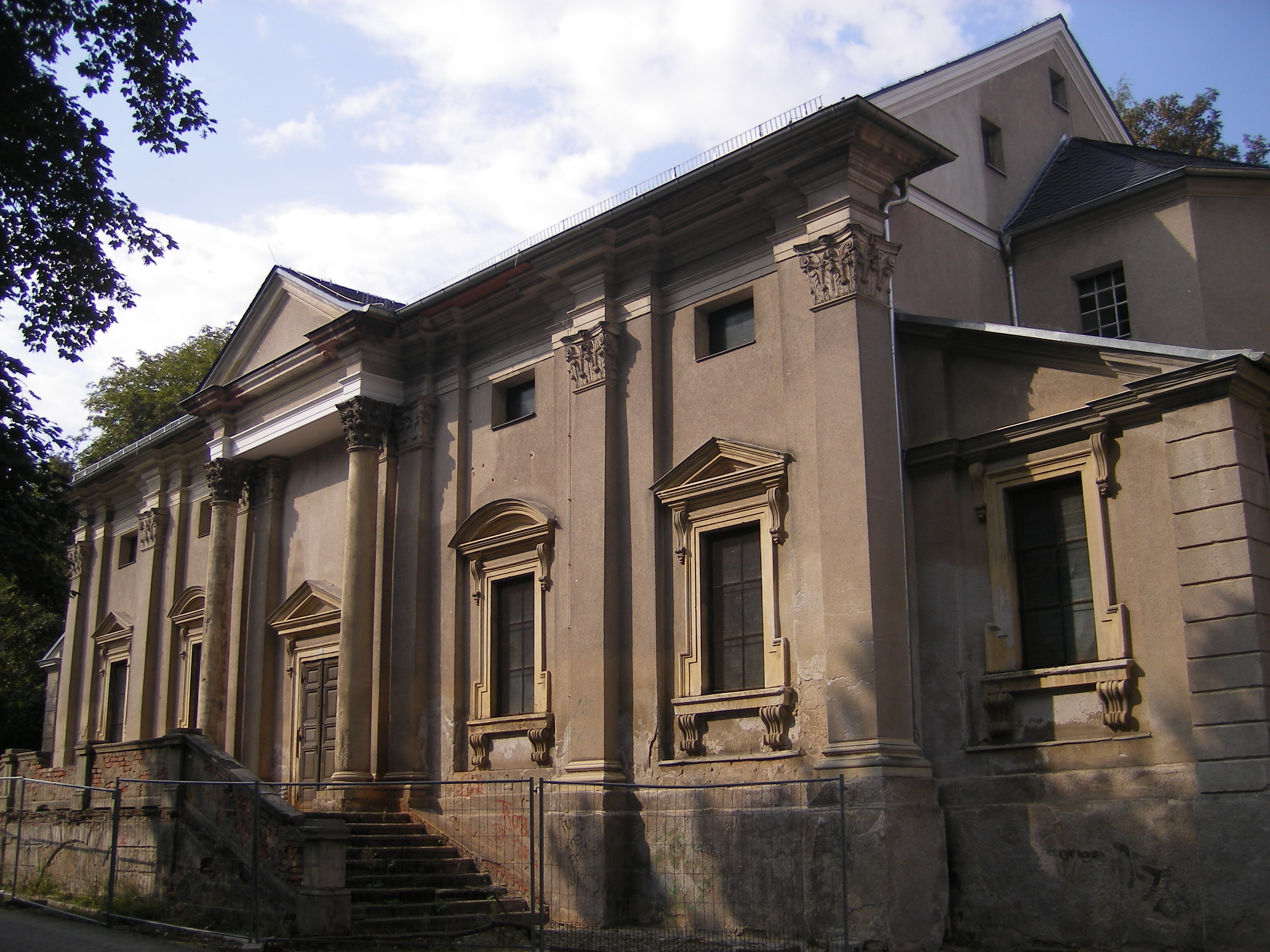
Cemetery Church

==== Ducal buildings ====
- Altenburg Castle is the big ducal residence on a hill above the city center. It was in use first as fortification and later as residence since the 9th century until the end of monarchy in Germany in 1918. Today's castle is of 17th and 18th century origin and was built in Renaissance, later in Baroque style. The chapel is of older origin (see above). The castle is the scene of the famous Prinzenraub, related by Carlyle in his "Miscellanies".
- Further buildings within the castle complex are the Junkerei in the north, built in the 16th century, the Flasche, an old castle tower from the 11th century, the Hausmannturm, built in the 12th century as the castle's keep as well as the Prinzenpalais and the Hofmarschallamt in the south, built after a fire in 1868.
- Next to the castle lies the Schlosspark (castle park) with some more ducal buildings: the Baroque Teehaus (tea house) (1712), the Baroque Orangerie (1712) and the historist Marstall (1851).
- The Amtshaus was built between 1725 and 1728 in Baroque style at Burgstraße and is now used as district court.
- The Kanzlei was the seat of some ducal authorities, built in 1476 at Brühl.
- The Neues Ministerium at Lindenaustraße was built in 1895 in Classicist style and is now the seat of the district government.
- The former Landgericht at Pauritzer Platz was built in 1859 in Neo-Renaissance style and hosts the social court now.
- The Landesbank (federal state bank) at Burgstraße was built in 1865 in Neo-Renaissance style. Currently, it is vacant.
- The Ducal Mausoleum in Altenburg Cemetery (burial site of several Dukes and Duchesses), now in ruins (those buried there removed to other parts of the cemetery in 1974).
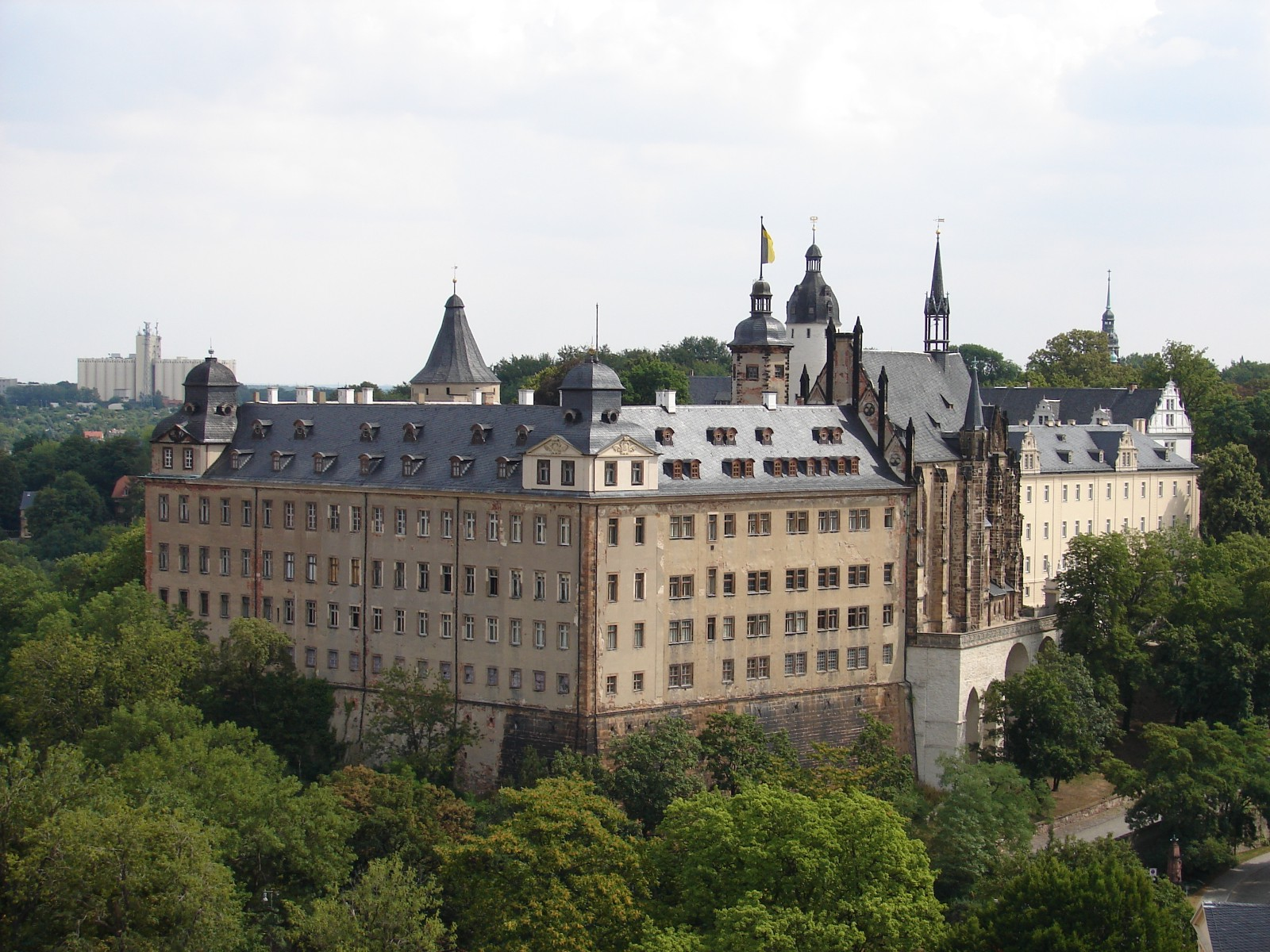
Altenburg Castle

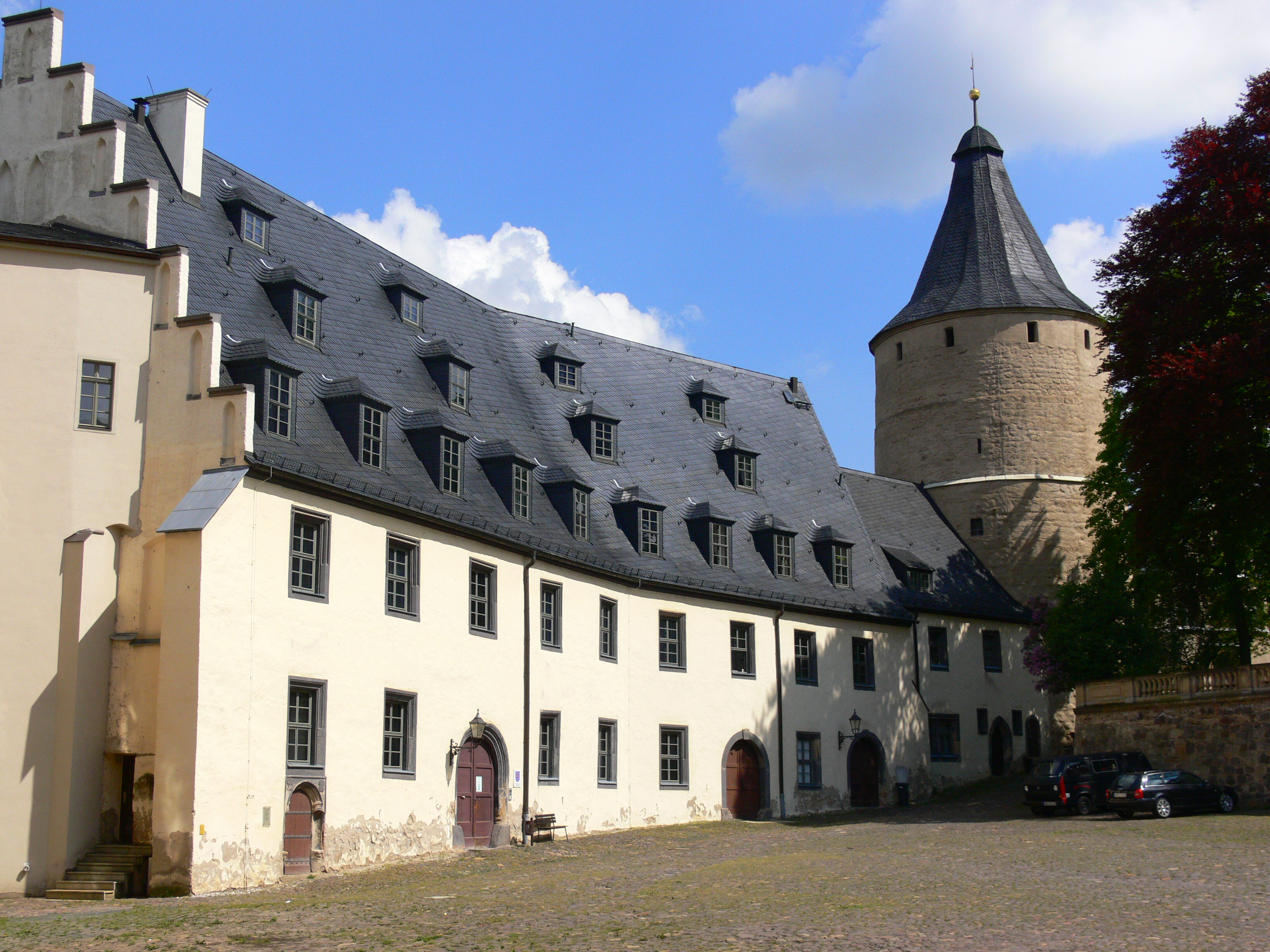
Junkerei and Flasche tower

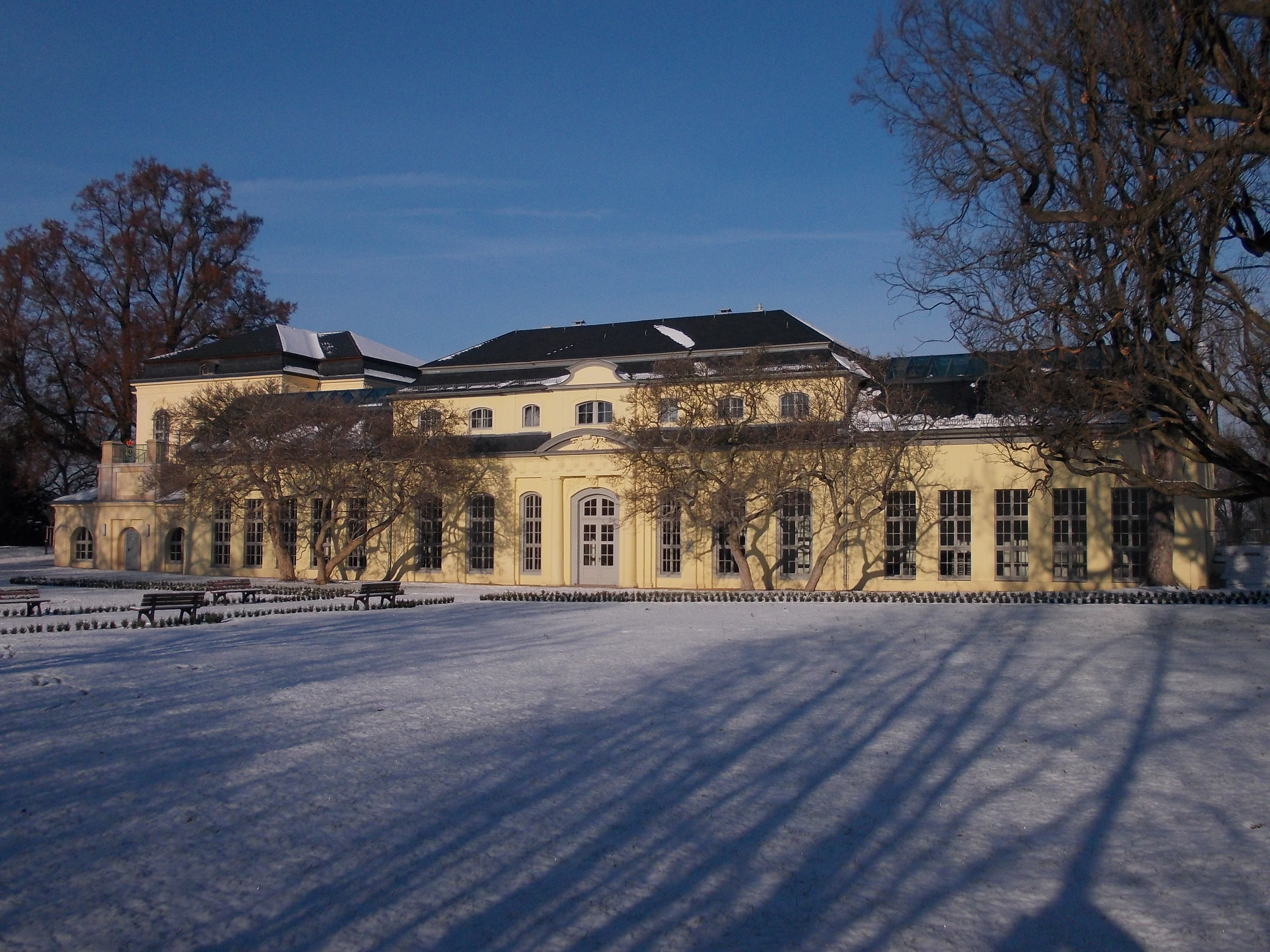
Orangerie

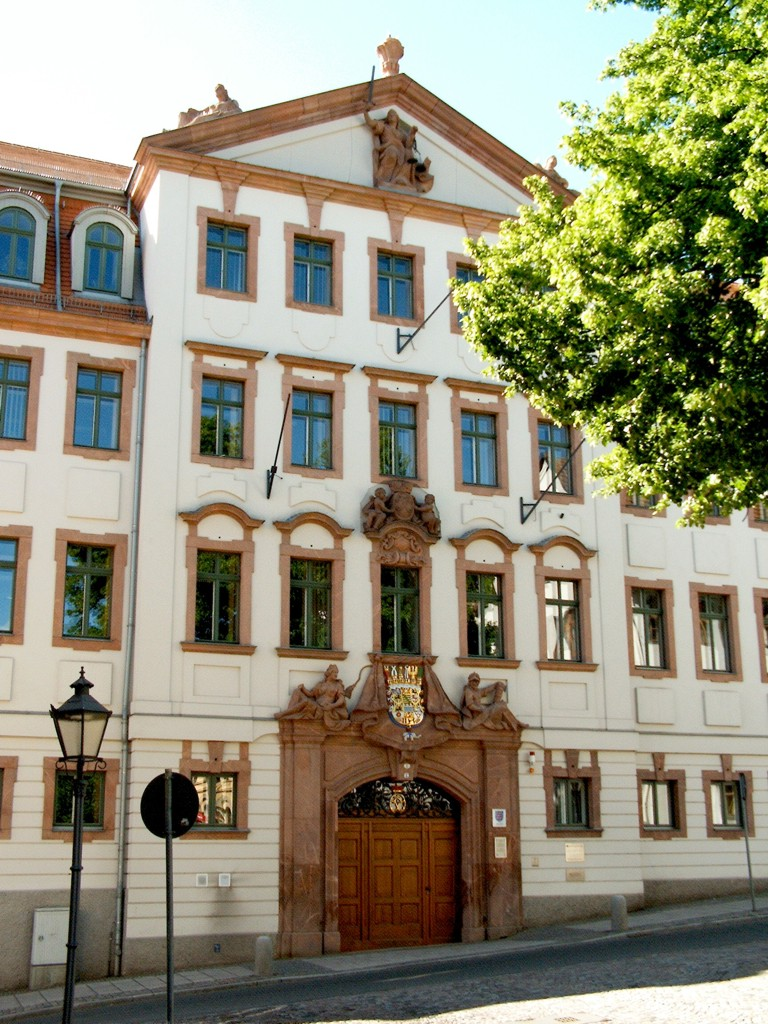
Amtshaus

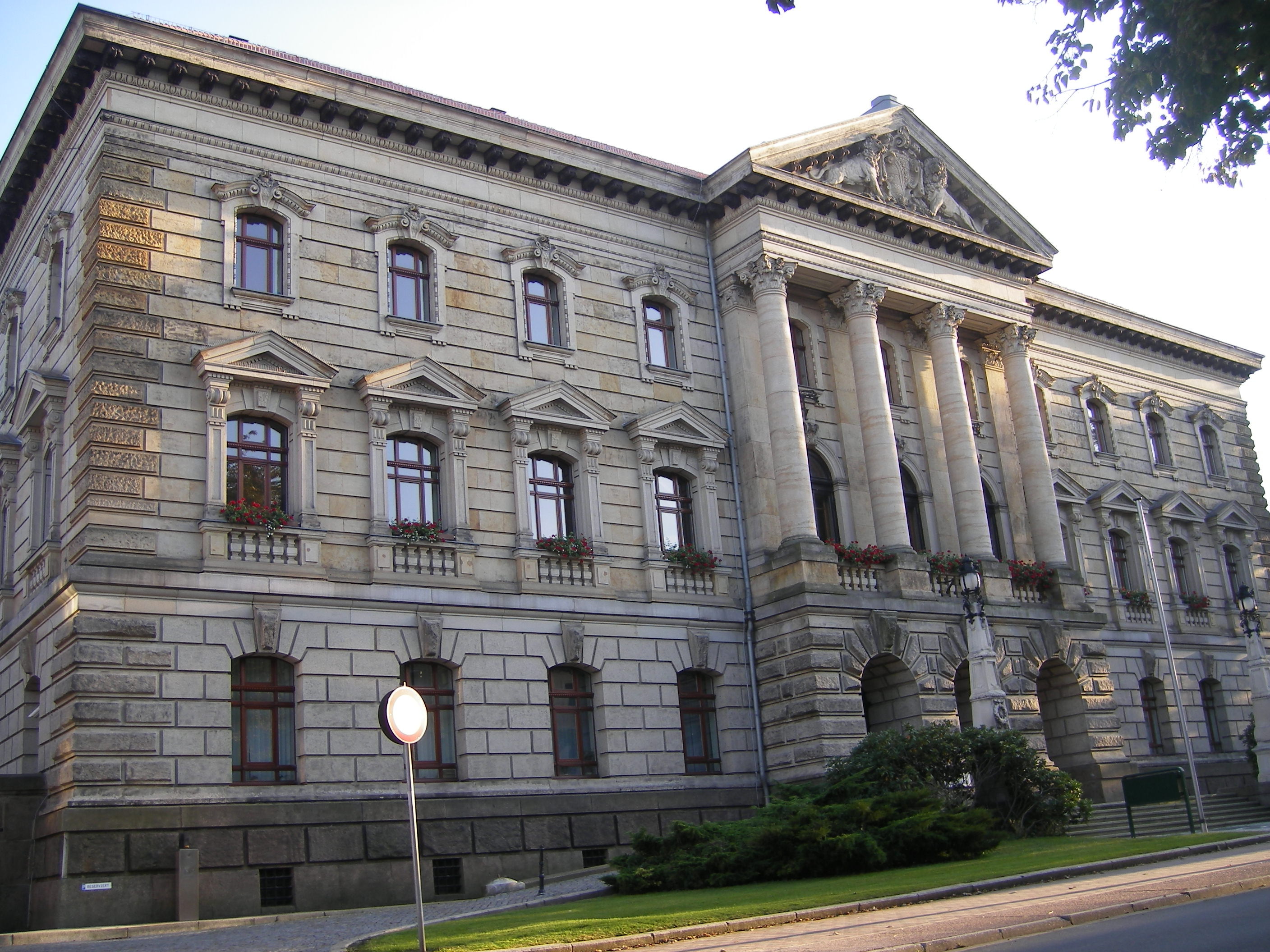
Neues Ministerium

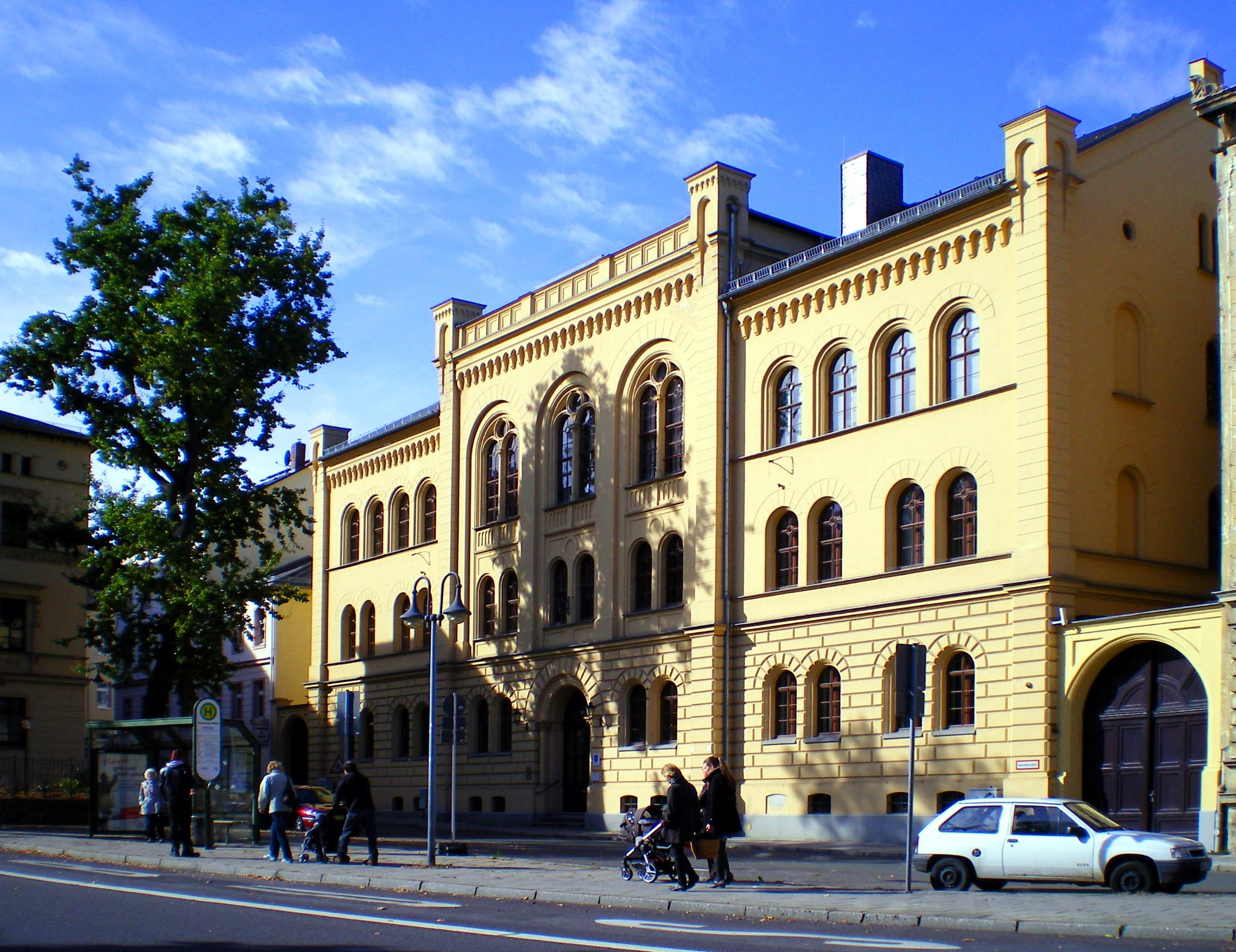
Former Landesgericht

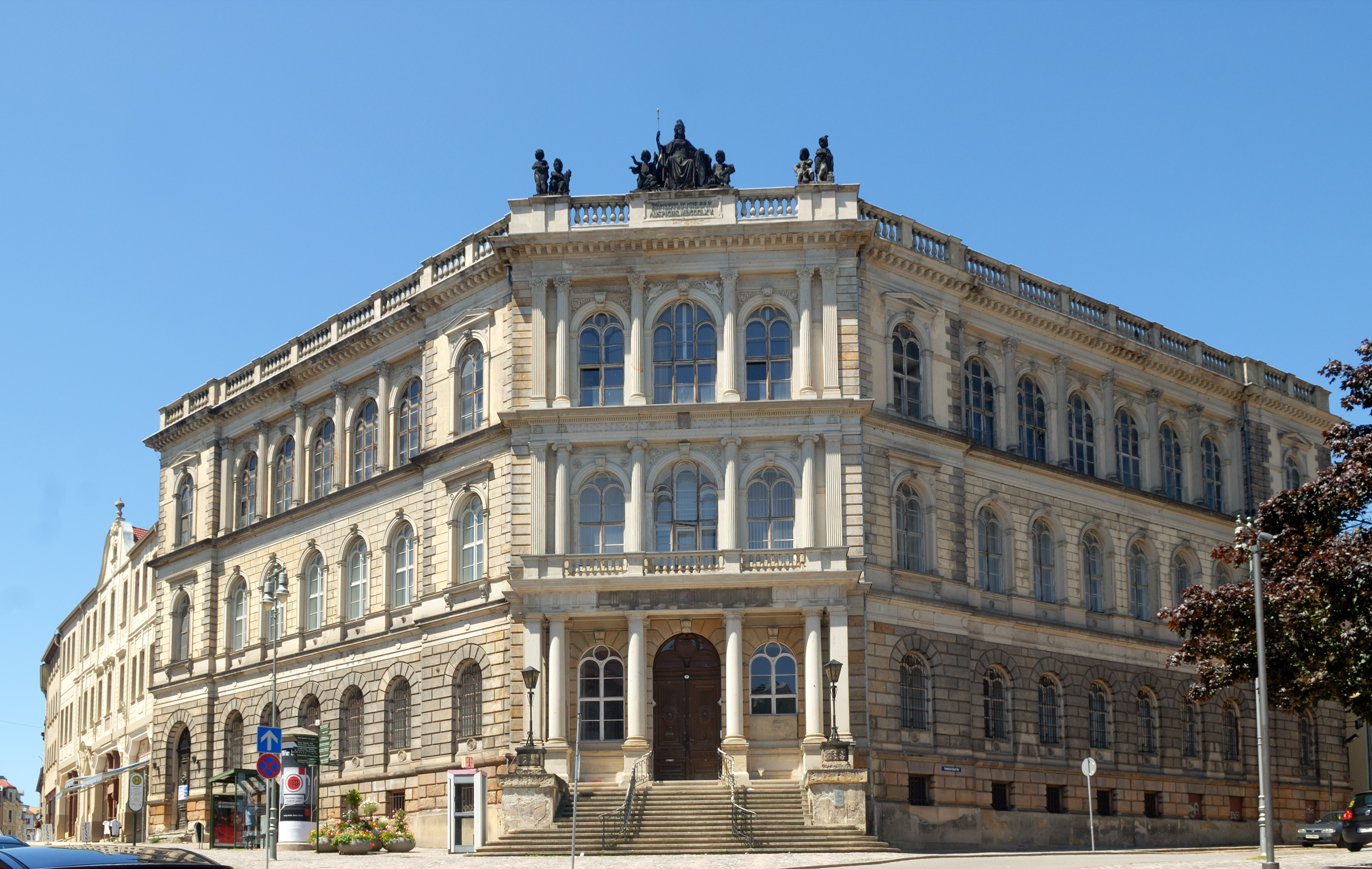
Former Landesbank

==== Other sights ====
- The town hall is one of the most important Renaissance buildings in Germany. It was built between 1562 and 1564 by the architect Nikolaus Gromann.
- The Landestheater is the theater of Altenburg, built in Neo-Baroque style in 1871.
- The city wall remained in the north behind Johannisstraße and in the south at Langengasse. Two towers are preserved at Langengasse and Kunstgasse.
- The Palais Seckendorff at Brühl is a Baroque style nobility palace, built in 1724.
- The Wasserkunst at Kunstgasse is an old waterwork, built in 1844 in Classicist style.
- The Pohlhof at Pohlhofgasse is a small Renaissance palace.
- The Freemasons' Lodge at Johannisgraben was built in 1804 in Classicist style.
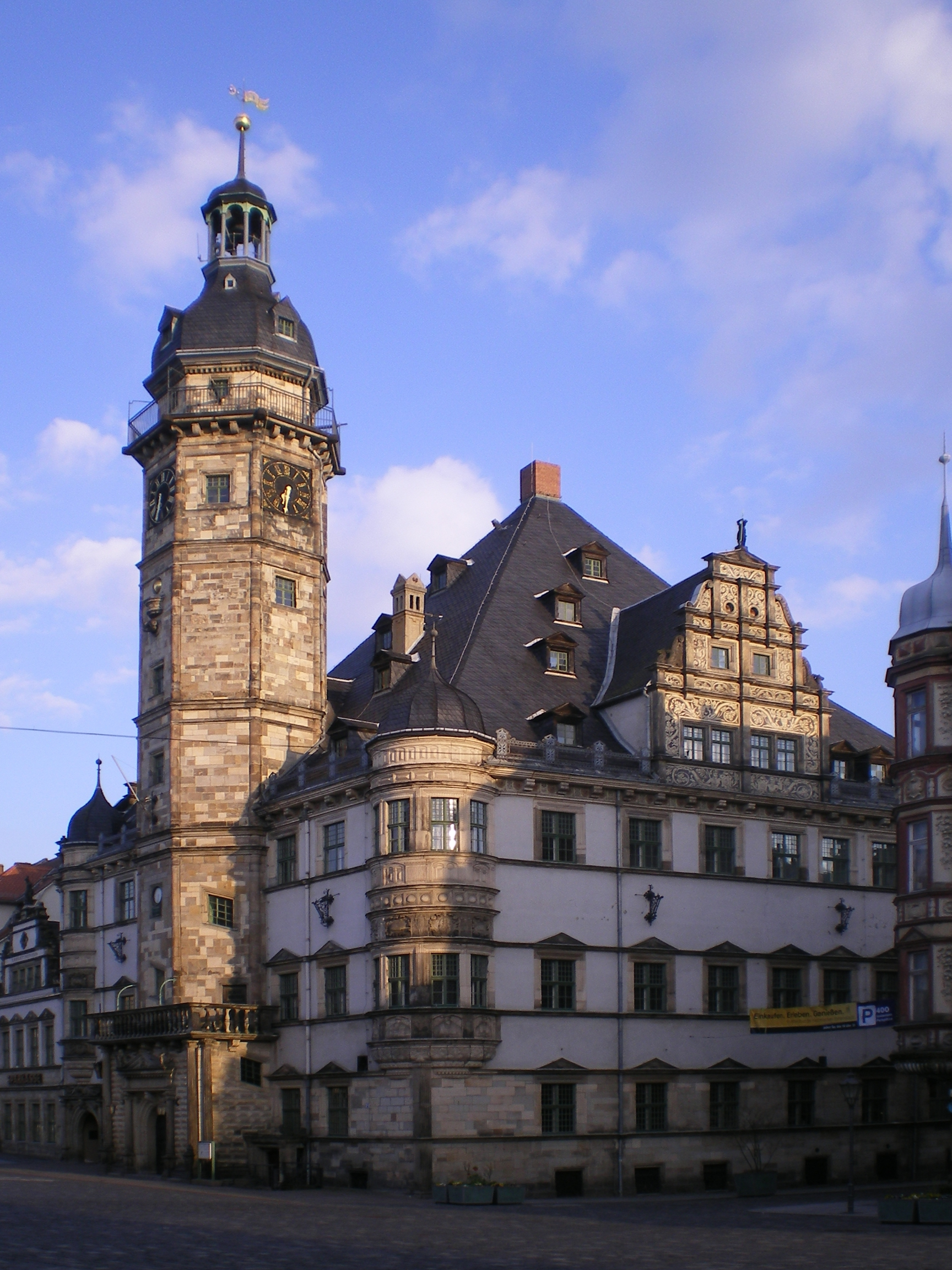
Town hall

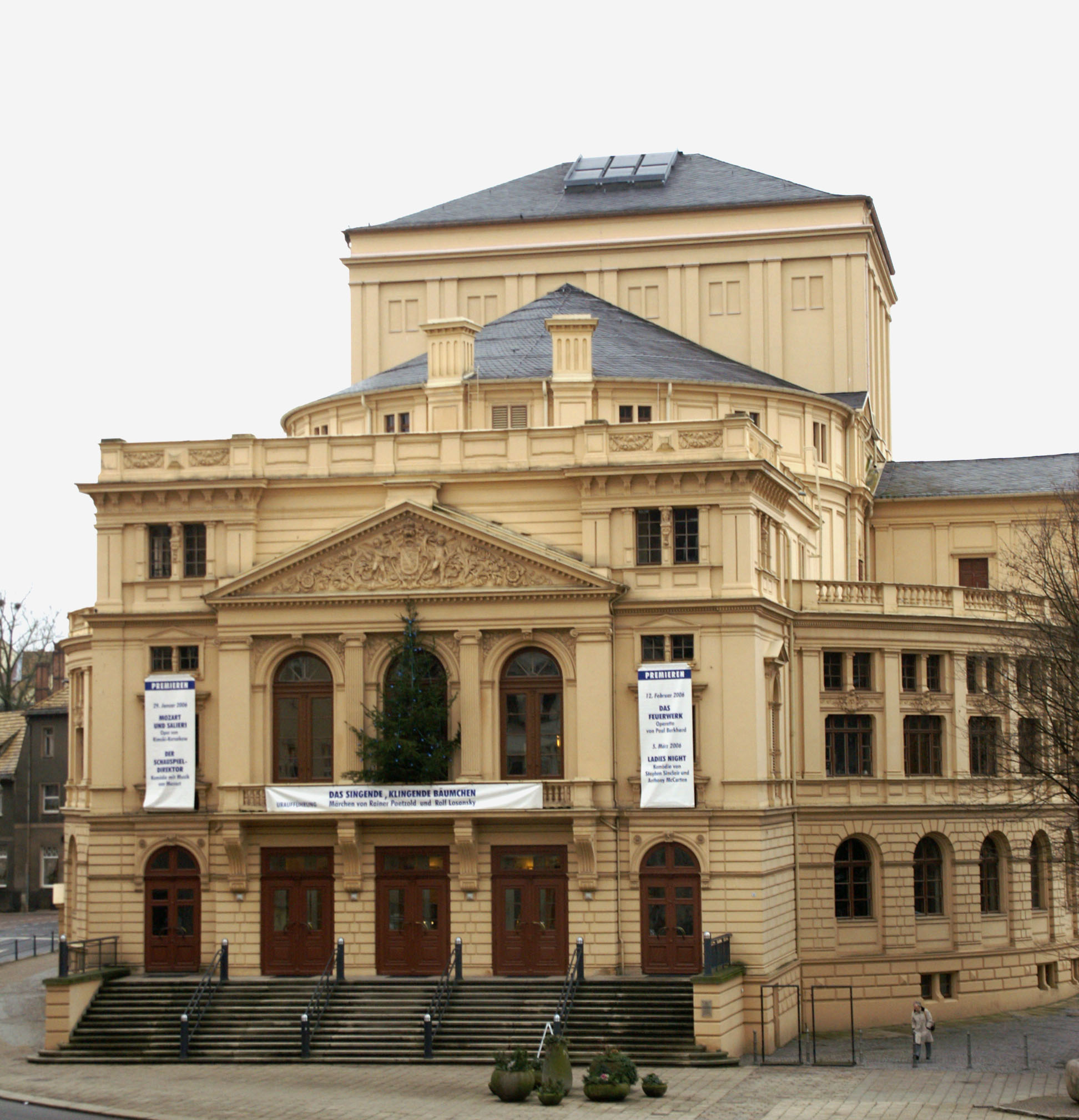
Theater

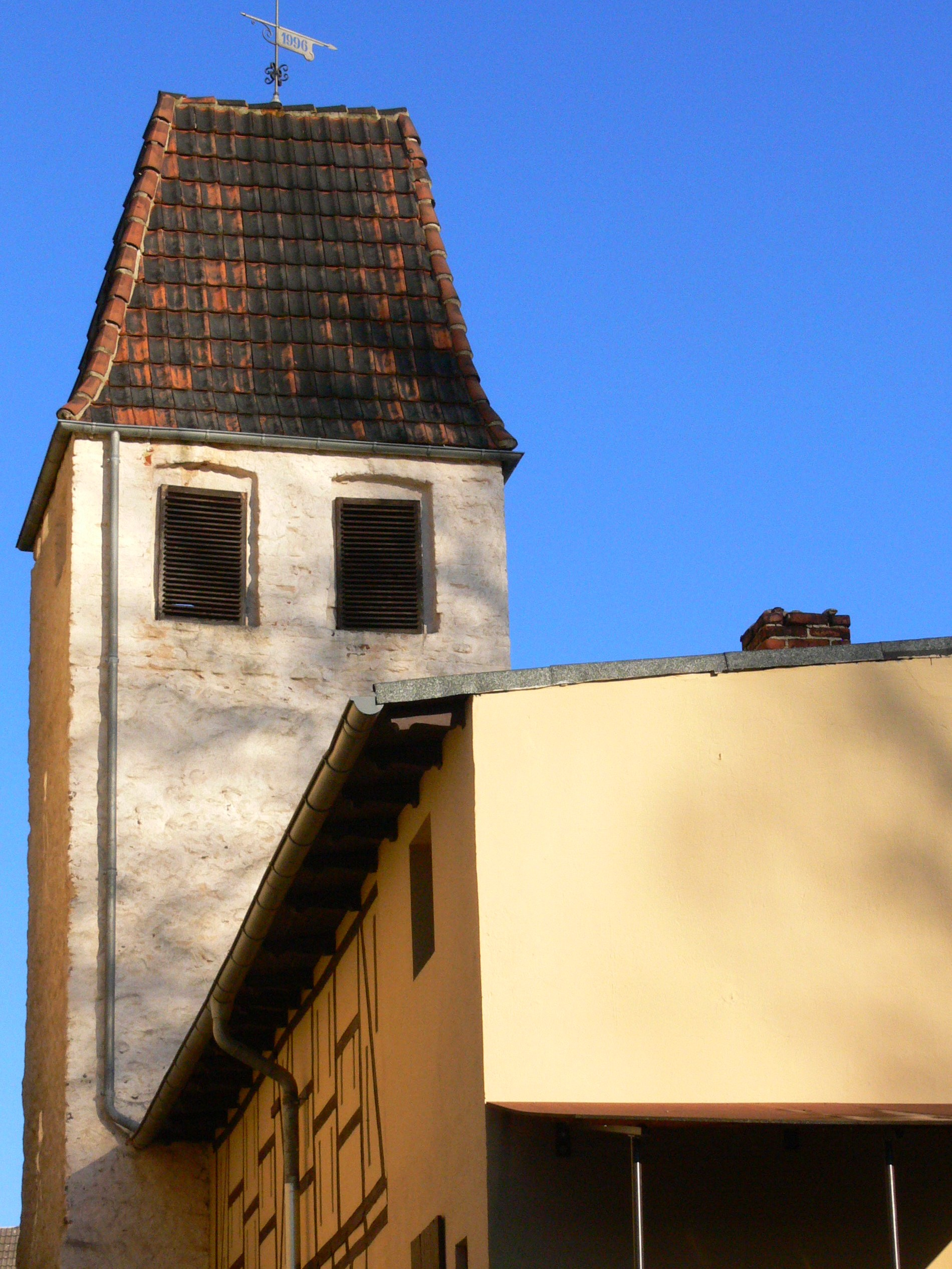
Tower at the city wall

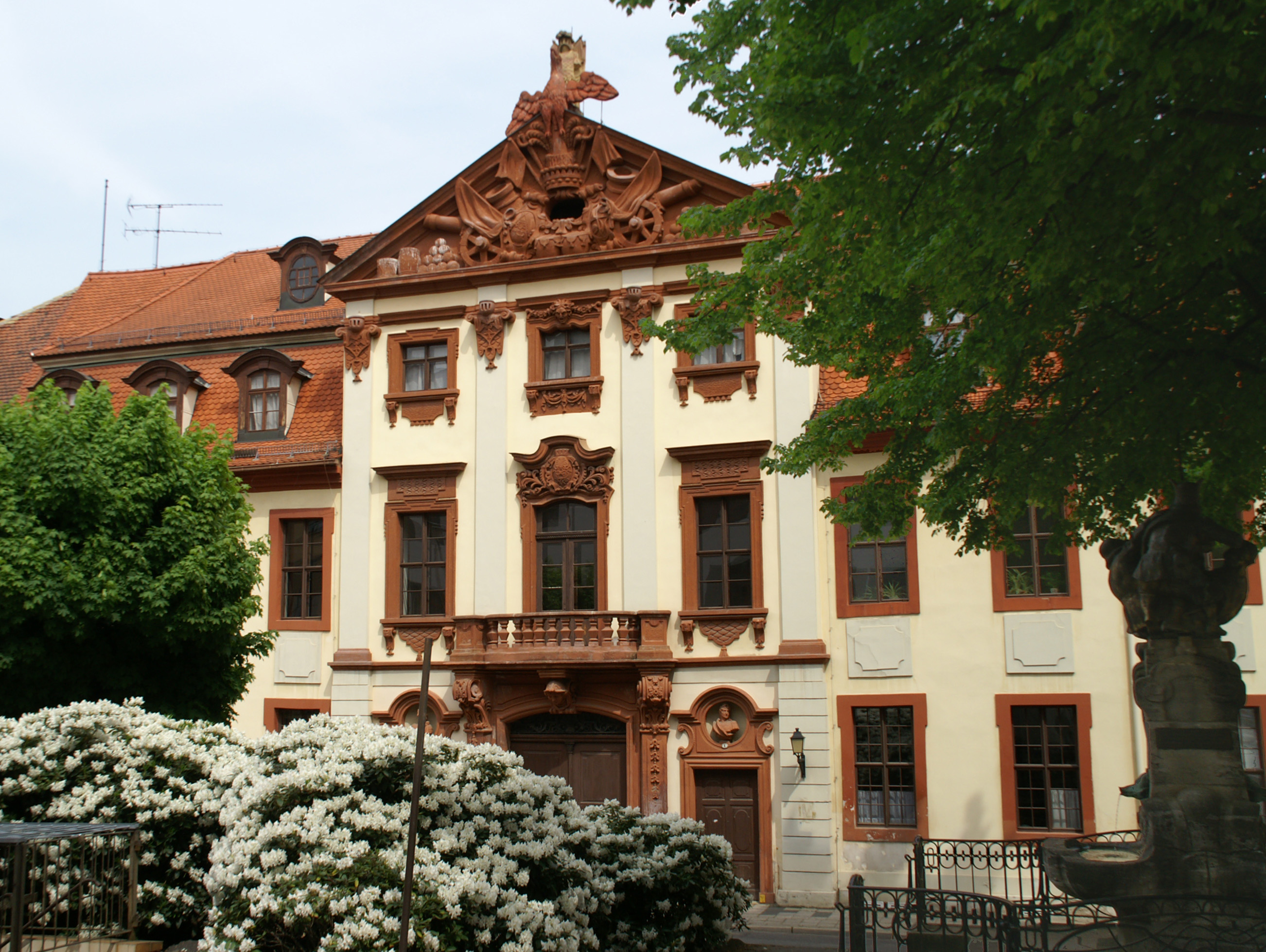
Palais Seckendorff

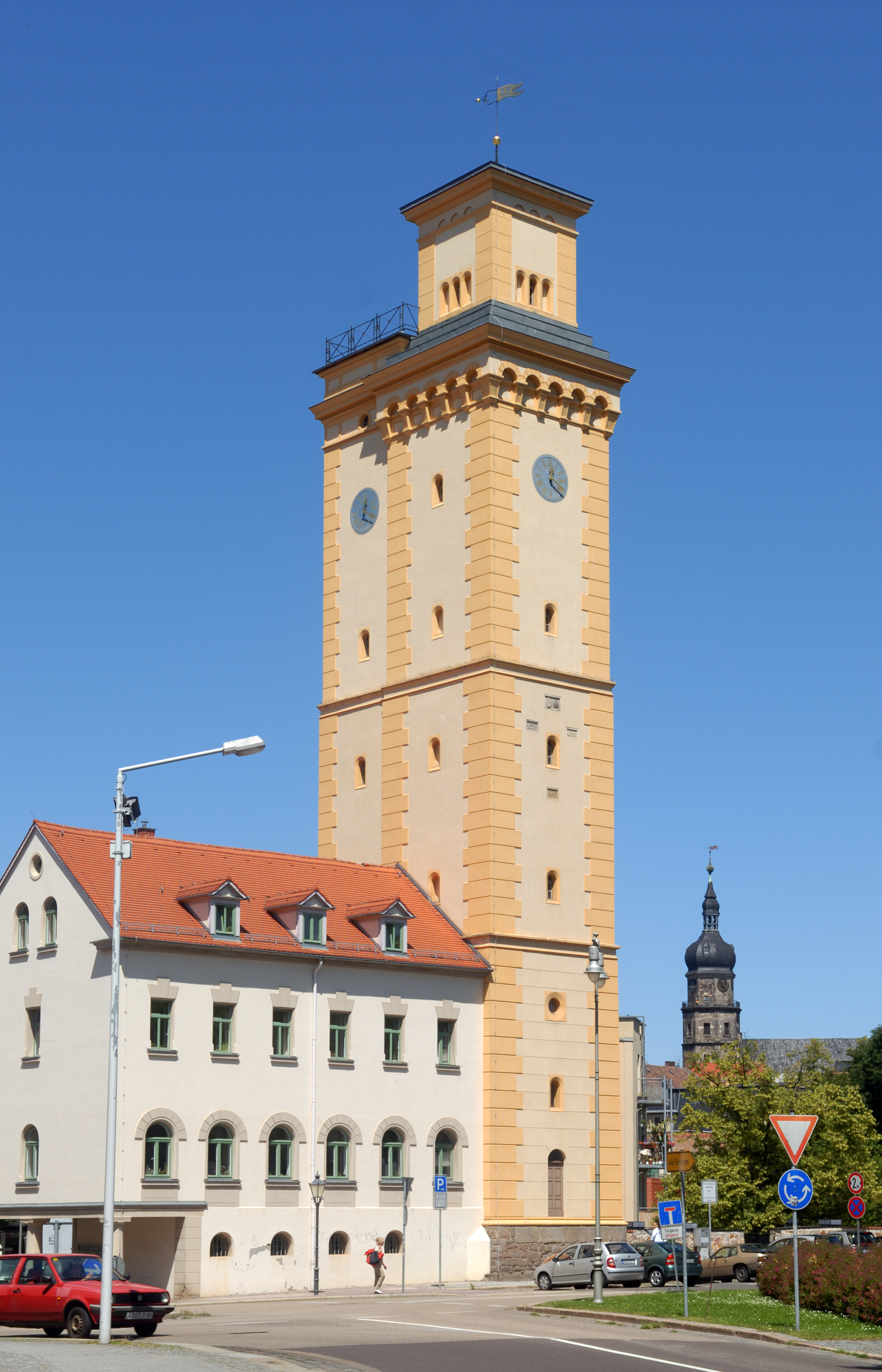
Wasserkunst

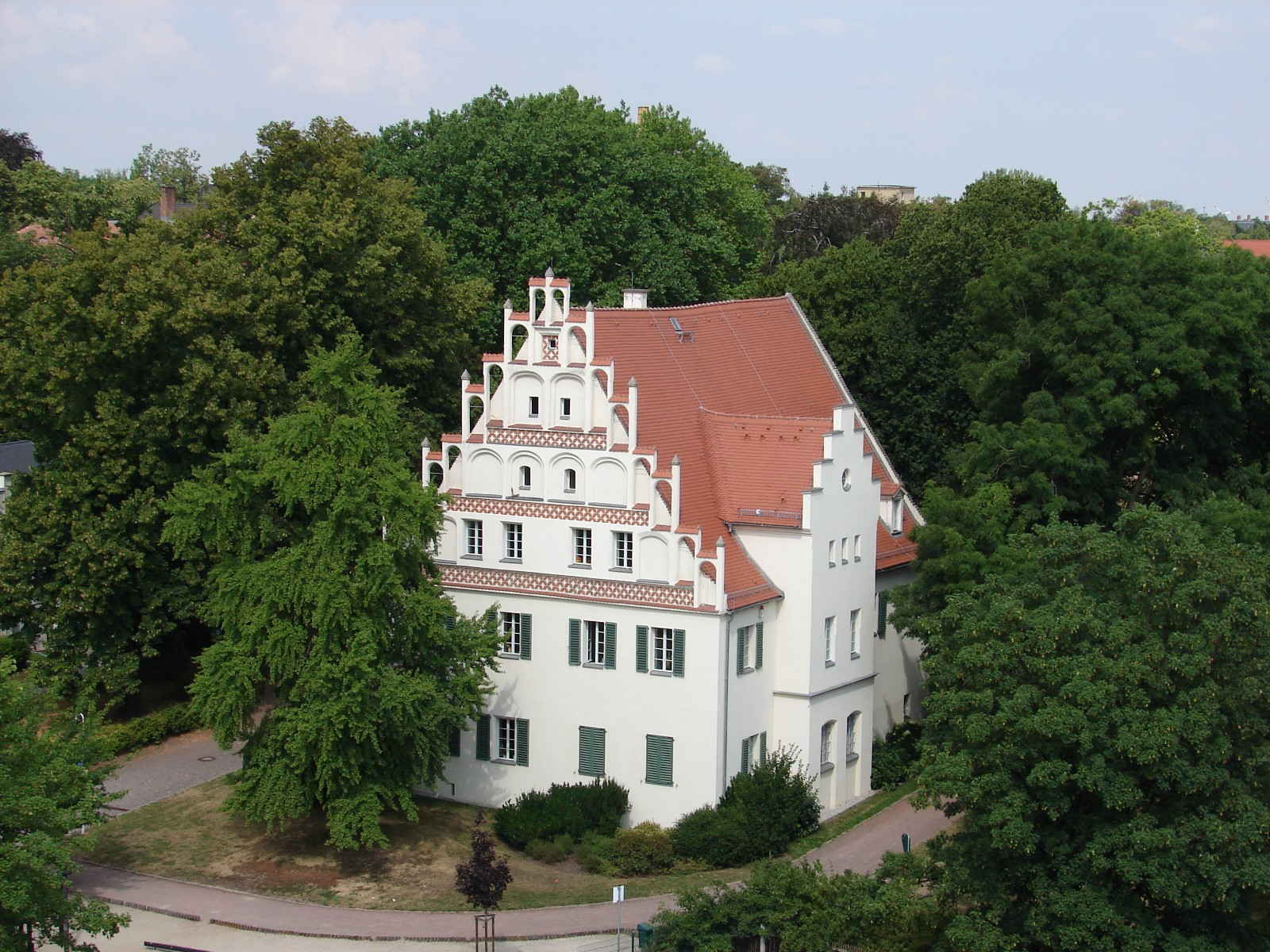
Pohlhof

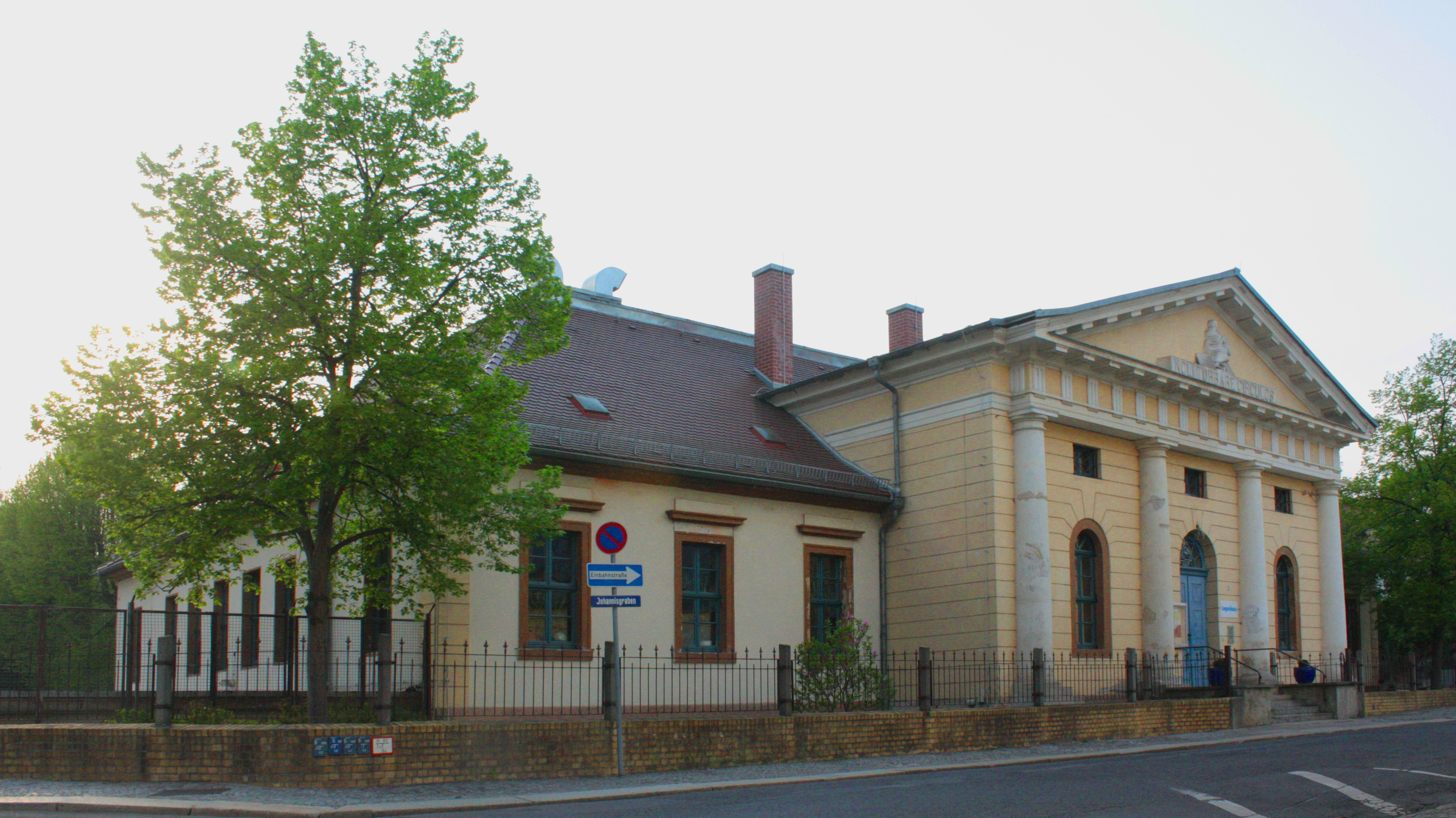
Freemasons' Lodge

== Economy and infrastructure ==
=== Agriculture, industry and services ===
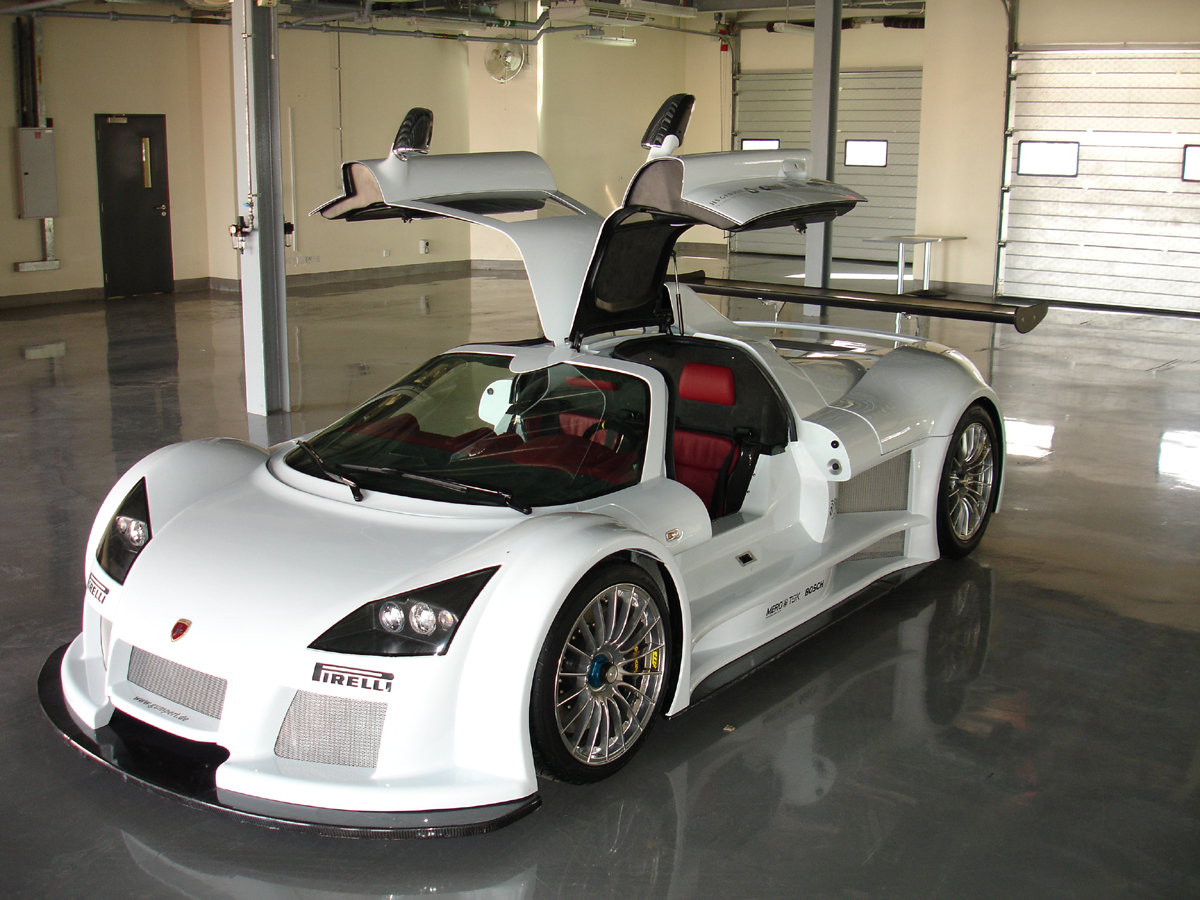
Gumpert Apollo

Agriculture plays an important role in the region, because the Loess soil around the city is very fertile. 69% of the municipal territory is in agricultural use, both for cultivation and cattle farming. A famous product of the region is Altenburger Ziegenkäse, a soft cheese of goat milk with some caraway seed inside with protected Geographical indication. Another typical dish of Altenburg is Mutzbraten, a flame-grilled pork speciality. Altenburg is also known for its mustard, which is produced by Altenburger Senf und Feinkost. Altenburger beer also enjoys some popularity.

The industry of Altenburg was based on the production of textiles and hardware during the 19th and 20th century, but most of the companies did not survive the transition to capitalism after German reunification. Altenburg was especially known for its sewing machine production from companies like L. O. Dietrich (machines Vesta, Saxonia, Löwe, Minerva, Juno), Hermann Köhler AG (machines Köhler, Diva, Clementine, Hermann, Dora, Orion, Globus), Textima Wittenberge (Columba, Altin), Gustav Winselmann GmbH (Titan, Vera, Bera, Hera, Heraldus, Omnia, Marvel, Noris, Regia, Saxony, the Wellington).

Today, the main branches are food industries (with a factory of Vion NV amongst others) and engineering with car component production in focus. The Gumpert Sportwagenmanufaktur produced the Gumpert Apollo supercar between 2005 and its bankruptcy in 2013. Altenburg is also noted for produced playing cards. The Altenburger Spielkartenfabrik (playing card factory) was founded in 1831; today it is a subsidiary company of Cartamundi and market leader in Germany. In 2012, there were 19 companies with more than 20 workers in industrial sector, employing 1,400 people and generating an overall turnover of €451 million.

Altenburg is a regional service hub for retail, hospitals, government, culture etc. Tourism doesn't play a big role, although the city hosts many historic sights and is a local center of culture with theater and museums. In 2012, 37,000 hotel guests had 87,000 overnight stays in Altenburg.

=== Transport ===
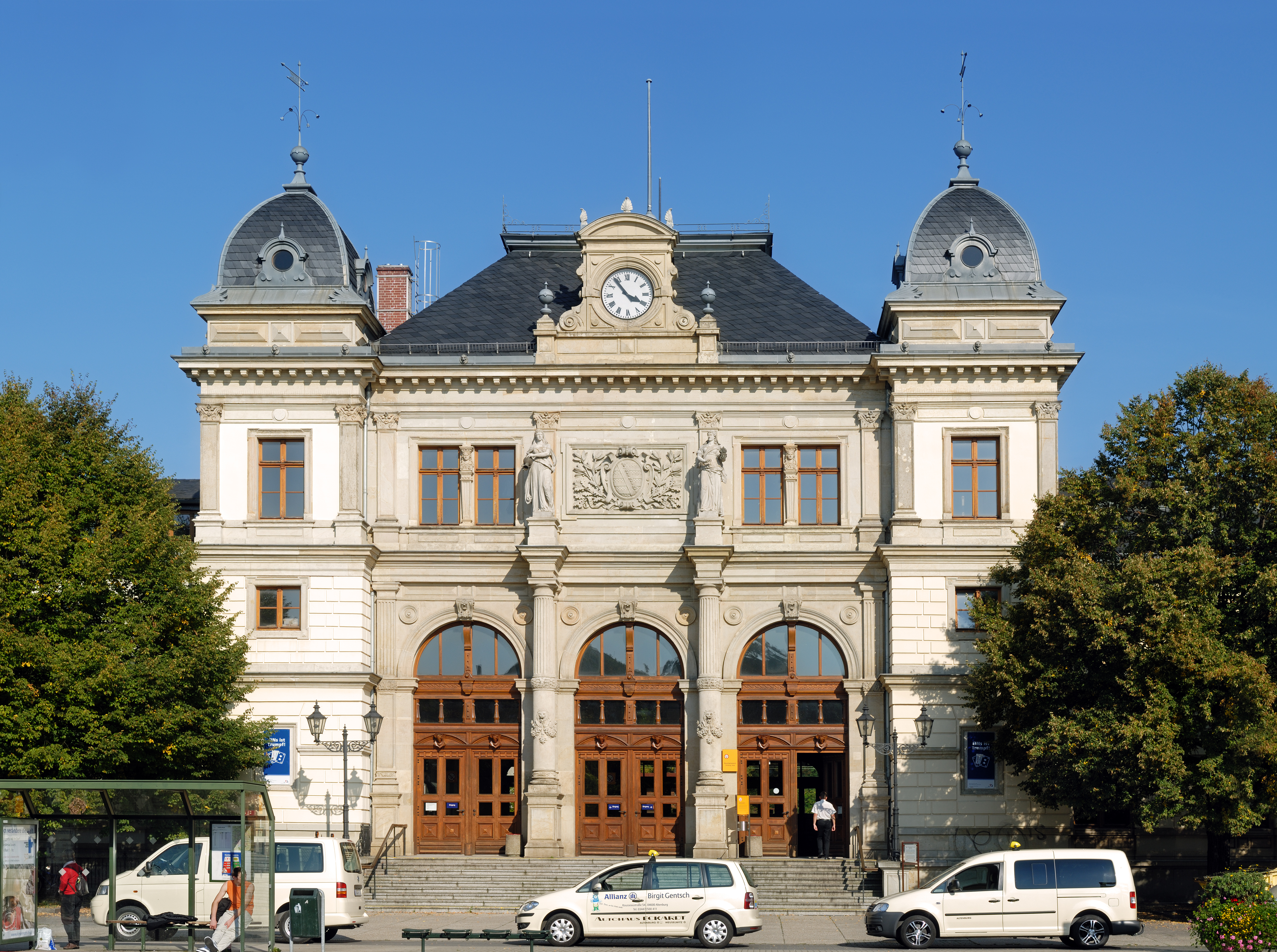
Altenburg station

Altenburg was the first city in Thuringia with connection to the railway, established in 1842 with the Leipzig–Hof line. Initially, Altenburg station was a terminus station, which became impractical as traffic grew, so a new through station was built in 1878 in the north-east of the city. In addition to the connections to Leipzig (1842) and Hof/Zwickau (1844), some more lines were established to Glauchau (1858, via Gößnitz), to Gera (1865, via Gößnitz), to Zeitz (1872, abandoned in 2002) and to Narsdorf (1901, abandoned in 1998). Today, the Altenburg station is the only station within the municipality, after the Paditz station (on the Hof line) and the North Altenburg station (on the Zeitz line) were closed. There are some regional trains to Leipzig, Zwickau and Erfurt (via Gera and Jena) today. Glauchau can be reached by changing trains in the near Gößnitz station. With the rollout of the Leipzig City Tunnel in December 2013, the services on the Leipzig–Hof/Zwickau line were reorganized and integrated in the S-Bahn Mitteldeutschland with connections to Leipzig twice an hour. The connection to long-distance trains is carried out via Leipzig (north and east), Jena (south) and Erfurt (west), since the last long-distance trains on the Leipzig–Hof line ceased operating in 2006.

Altenburg is situated between two Autobahns: the A4 (Erfurt–Dresden) passes approximately 20 km (12 mi) south and the A72 (Leipzig–Chemnitz) passes approximately 20 km (12 mi) east of the city. Regional traffic is carried by the three national roads in Altenburg. The B7 is the connection to Gera (and A4 in Erfurt direction) in the south-west and to Rochlitz in the north-east, the B93 runs to Borna (and A72 in Leipzig direction) in the north and to Zwickau in the south and the B180 links Altenburg with Zeitz in the west and Hohenstein-Ernstthal (and A72/A4 in Chemnitz and Dresden direction via secondary road 1357) in the south-east. An important secondary road connects Altenburg with Gera north to the B7 via Lumpzig. The B7 and B93 bypass the town center on a ring road to absorb the transit traffic between Leipzig and Zwickau.

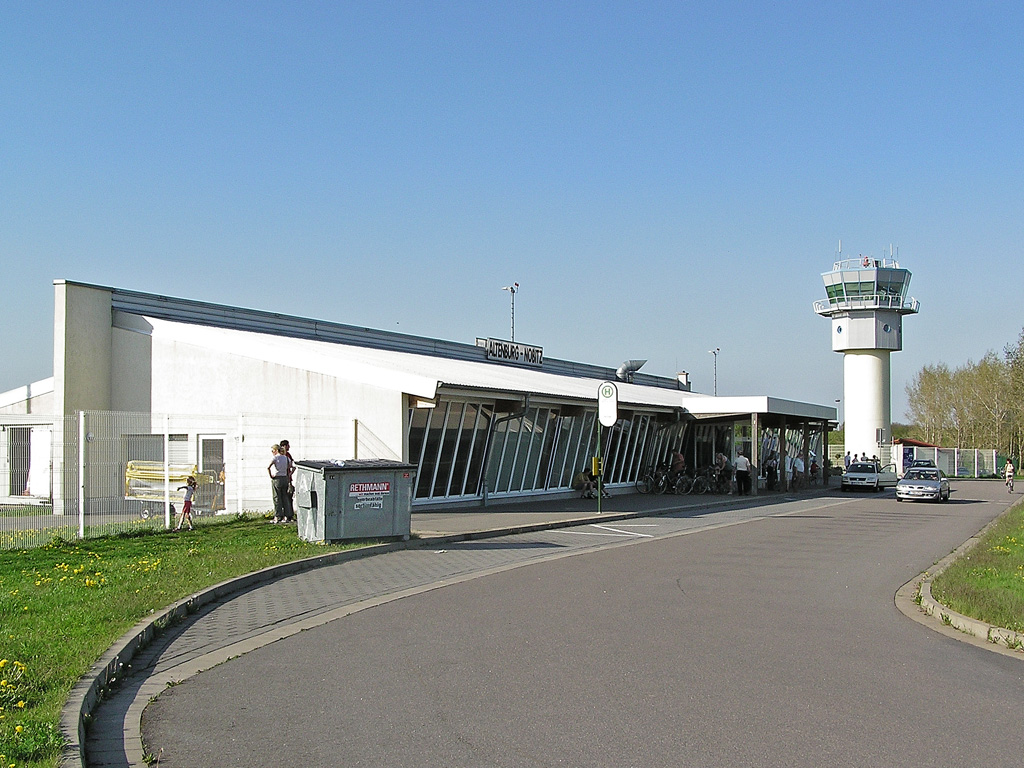
Leipzig-Altenburg Airport

The Leipzig-Altenburg Airport, a former Soviet military airport, is situated 5 km (3 mi) east of the city and was used by Ryanair for flights to London Stansted, Barcelona-Girona and Edinburgh until 2011. Currently, there are no public flights at this airport. The next regional airport is located in Leipzig/Halle (60 km (37 mi) to the north).

Biking is becoming more popular since the construction of long-distance cycle tracks began in the 1990s. Both the Pleiße track, along the Pleiße valley from Werdau near Zwickau to Leipzig, and the Thuringian city track (Radweg Thüringer Städtekette) from Eisenach via Erfurt, Weimar, Jena and Gera to Altenburg, connect points of tourist interest.

Local public transport within Altenburg is based exclusively on buses. Six lines connect the outlying quarters to the inner city. Furthermore, there are some regional bus services to the villages in the district. The Altenburg Tramway was in operation from 1895 until 1920.

=== Education ===
There are three Gymnasiums in Altenburg: two state-owned and one Christian (ecumenical).

== Politics ==
=== Mayor and city council ===
The first freely elected mayor after German reunification was Johannes Ungvari of the Christian Democratic Union (CDU), who served from 1990 to 2000. He was succeeded by Michael Wolf of the Social Democratic Party (SPD), who served until 2018. Since 2018, André Neumann of the CDU has been mayor. The most recent mayoral election was held on 15 April 2018, and the results were as follows:

Candidate	Party	Votes	%
André Neumann	Christian Democratic Union	7,614	55.6
Frank Schütze	Independent	3,296	24.0
Katharina Schenk	Social Democratic Party	2,795	20.4
Valid votes		13,705	98.7
Invalid votes		177	1.3
Total		13,882	100.0
Electorate/voter turnout		27,725	50.1
Source: Wahlen in Thüringen

The most recent city council election was held on 26 May 2019, and the results were as follows:

Party	Lead candidate	Votes	%	±	Seats	±
Christian Democratic Union (CDU)	André Neumann	11,510	30.4	▲5.0	11	▲2
Pro Alternburg	Peter Müller	9,326	24.7	▲6.4	9	▲3
City Forum Altenburg (Note: The Greens and City Forum Alternburg ran on a combined list in 2014, which won 7.7% and 3 seats.)	Johannes Schaefer	5,227	13.8	New	5	New
The Left (Die Linke)	Kati Klaubert	5,187	13.7	▼8.3	5	▼3
Social Democratic Party (SPD)	Nikolaus Dorsch	4,356	11.5	▼13.3	4	▼5
Free Democratic Party (FDP)	Detlef Zschiegner	1,274	3.4	▲1.7	1	±0
Alliance 90/The Greens (Grüne) (Note: The Greens and City Forum Alternburg ran on a combined list in 2014, which won 7.7% and 3 seats.)	Claudia Große	942	2.5	New	1	New
Valid votes		12,718	95.7			
Invalid votes		566	4.3			
Total		13,284	100.0		36	±0
Electorate/voter turnout		27,296	48.7	▲7.0		
Source: Wahlen in Thüringen

== Twin towns – sister cities ==
Altenburg is twinned with:

- Offenburg, Germany
- Olten, Switzerland
- Zlín, Czech Republic
- Hickory, North Carolina, United States of America

== Notable people ==
- Günter Beier (born 1942), gymnast
- Friedrich von Beust (1817–1899), Privy Councillor, Chamberlain and Lord Marshal, Major General and Adjutant General

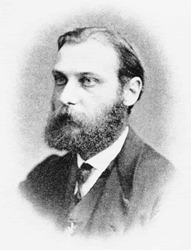
Walther Flemming

- Perry Bräutigam (born 1963), footballer
- Joachim Büchner (1905–1983), sprinter athlete
- Friedrich Arnold Brockhaus (1772–1823), encyclopedia publisher
- Hermann Askan Demme (1802–1867), physician and surgeon
- Adolph Douai (1819–1888), German-American journalist, social reformer and founder of the first kindergartens of the US
- Bernhard Erdmannsdörffer (1833–1901), historian
- Walther Flemming (1843–1905), biologist
- Frederick I (1122–1190), Holy Roman Emperor
- Erhard Frommhold (1928–2007), art historian and publicist
- Hans Conon von der Gabelentz (1807–1874)
- Georg von der Gabelentz (1840–1893), linguist and sinologist

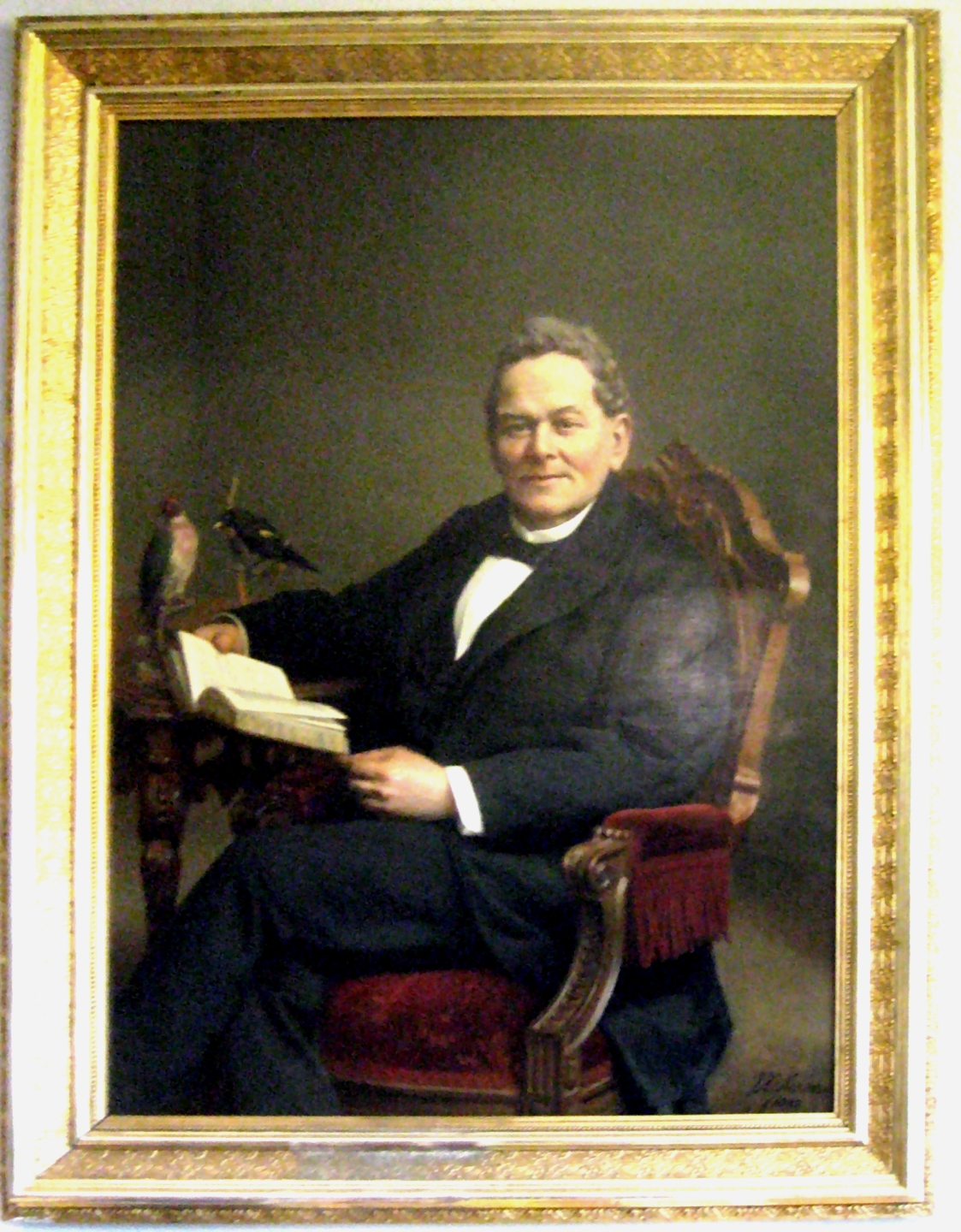
Hermann Schlegel in 1842

- Johann Georg August Galletti (1750–1828)
- Hanns Bruno Geinitz (1814–1900), geologist and paleontologist
- Ralf Haber (born 1962), hammer thrower
- Thomas Hoffmann (born 1979), politician (AfD)
- Dieter Kalka (born 1957), author, musician and songwriter
- Volker Kluge (born 1944), journalist
- Johann Ludwig Krebs (1713–1780), Baroque musician and composer
- Bernhard von Lindenau (1780–1854), lawyer, astronomer and politician
- Sophie Mereau (1770–1806), writer of German Romanticism
- Charles-Henri Petersen (1792-1859), paysagist architect who designed famous parks in Belgium, notably Les Orangeries de Bierbais
- Uwe Rösler (born 1968), football player and manager
- Hermann Schlegel (1804–1884), ornithologist, herpetologist and ichthyologist
- Ingo Schulze (born 1962), writer
- George Spalatin (1484–1545), humanist
- Heinrich Schmidt, Hauptsturmführer and camp doctor in the concentration camps
- Johann Severin Vater (1771–1826), theologian and linguist
- Jürgen Thiele, rowers, Olympic champion in 1980 in coxless four
- Kerstin Walther, athlete, with the GDR relay won the gold medal in the 4x400-meter race at the 1983 World Championship
- Christian Friedrich Witt, church musician and composer

== See also ==
- Fürstlich Sächsischer Hofbuchdruckerei zu Altenburg
