= Wieratal =

Municipality in Thuringia, Germany

Coordinates: 51.050°N 12.433°E

Wieratal is a former Verwaltungsgemeinschaft ("collective municipality") in the district Altenburger Land, in Thuringia, Germany. The seat of the Verwaltungsgemeinschaft was in Langenleuba-Niederhain. It was disbanded in July 2018.

== Municipalities ==
The Verwaltungsgemeinschaft Wieratal consisted of the following municipalities:

1. Frohnsdorf
2. Göpfersdorf
3. Jückelberg
4. Langenleuba-Niederhain
5. Ziegelheim
