= Benndorf (Frohburg) =

- Village of Frohburg
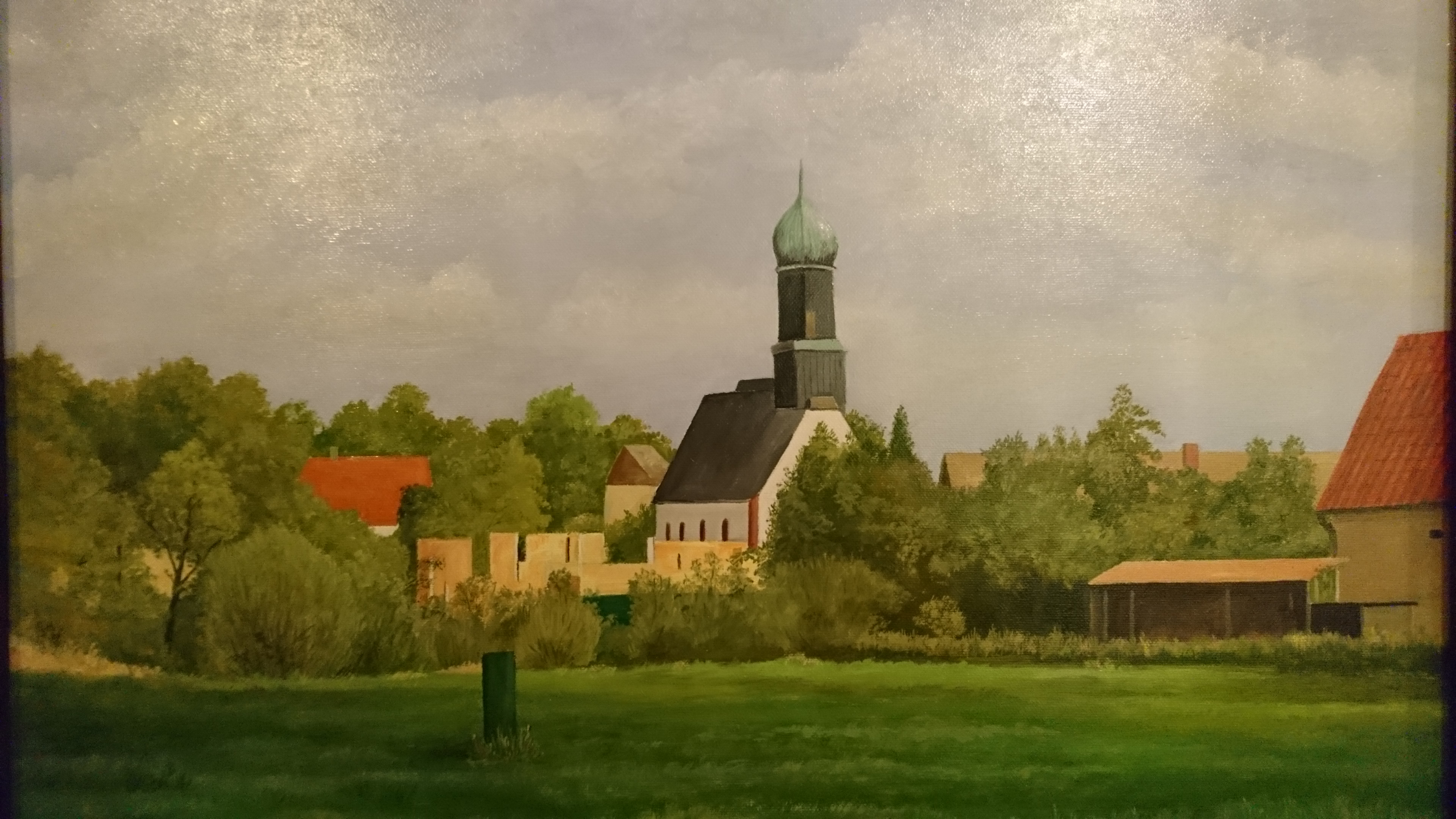

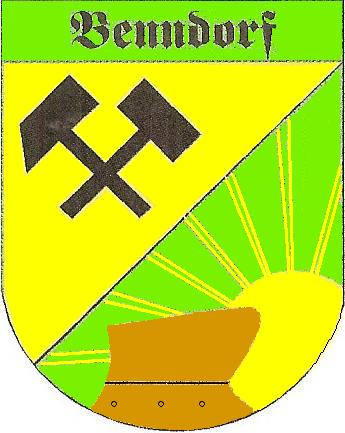
- Coat of arms
- Interactive map of Benndorf
- Location within Germany Location within Saxony
- Coordinates: 51°4′5″N 12°32′10″E
- Country: Germany
- State: Saxony
- District: Leipzig
- Town: Frohburg

Area
  - Total: 9.34 km^{2} (3.61 sq mi)
- Elevation: 156 m (512 ft)

Population (2016-12-31)
  - Total: 430
  - Density: 46/km^{2} (120/sq mi)
- Time zone: UTC+01:00 (CET)
  - Summer (DST): UTC+02:00 (CEST)
- Postal codes: 04654
- Dialling codes: 034348
- Vehicle registration: L, GHA, BNA, MTL, GRM, WUR

Benndorf (German pronunciation: [ˈbɛndɔʁf]) is a district of the town Frohburg in the Landkreis Leipzig district of Saxony, Germany. The former independent municipality became a district of Frohburg on 1 January 1997. Since 1948, the former independent municipality Bubendorf became part of Benndorf.

== Geography and traffic ==
=== Location ===
The village is situated in the valley of the Wyhra river 2 km north of Frohburg and 7 km southeast of Borna. Benndorf is 30 km south of Leipzig. West of it - in the forest - is the Thuringia state border.

=== Roads ===
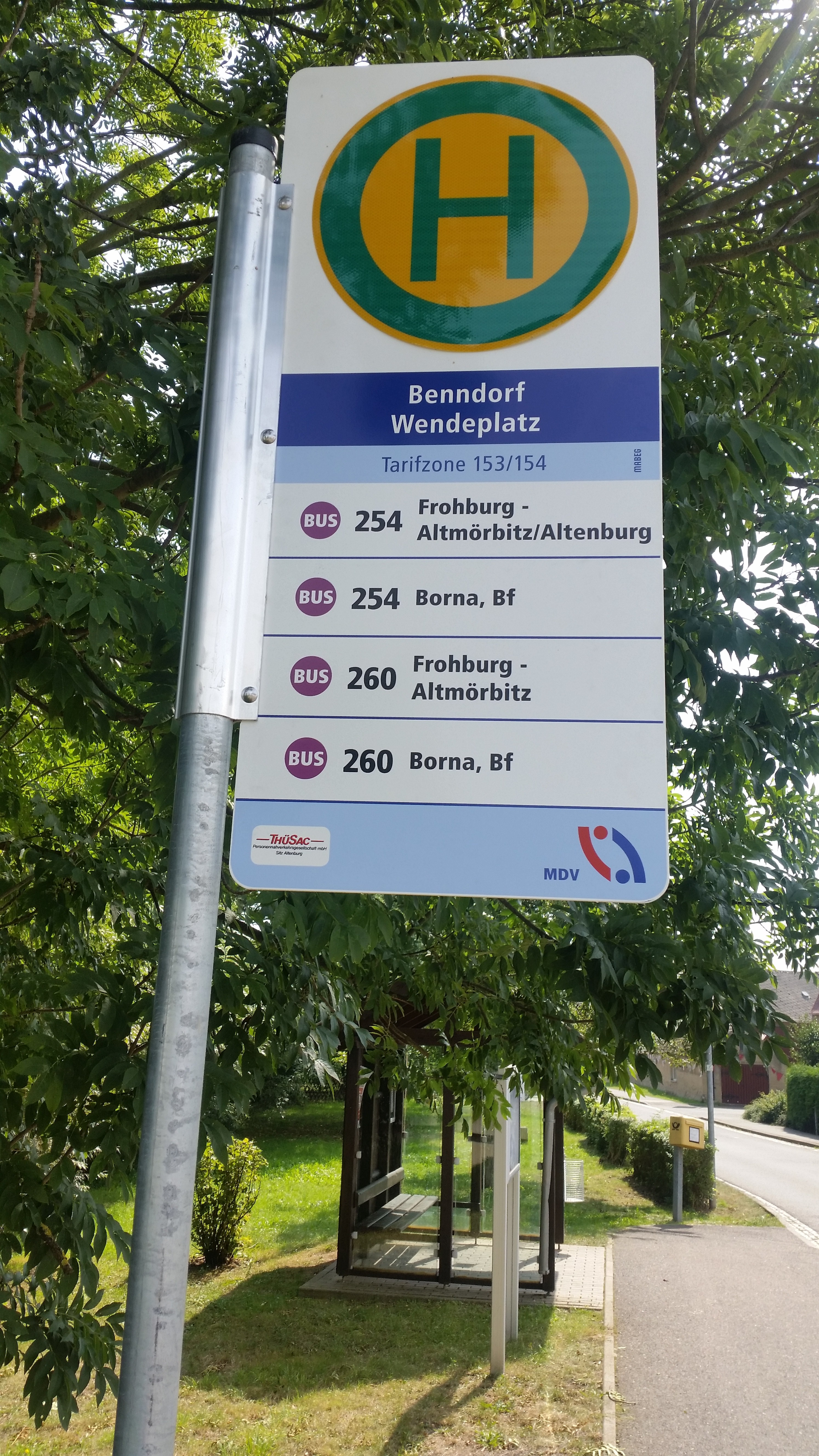
The Benndorf bus stop sign

Benndorf is connected to state route 51, on which one can reach the A 72 near Borna, by two narrow streets. Benndorf has bus connections to Borna, Altenburg and Frohburg.

=== Railroad ===
The Frohburg rail station is two kilometers northeast of Benndorf. It is connected via local trains to Leipzig and Geithain.

=== Airports ===
The closest airport, the Leipzig-Altenburg Airport at Nobitz, is situated 15 km south of Benndorf. The next closest airports with regular flight plans are Airport Leipzig/Halle 70 km north and Airport Dresden 110 km east.

=== Hiking and biking ===
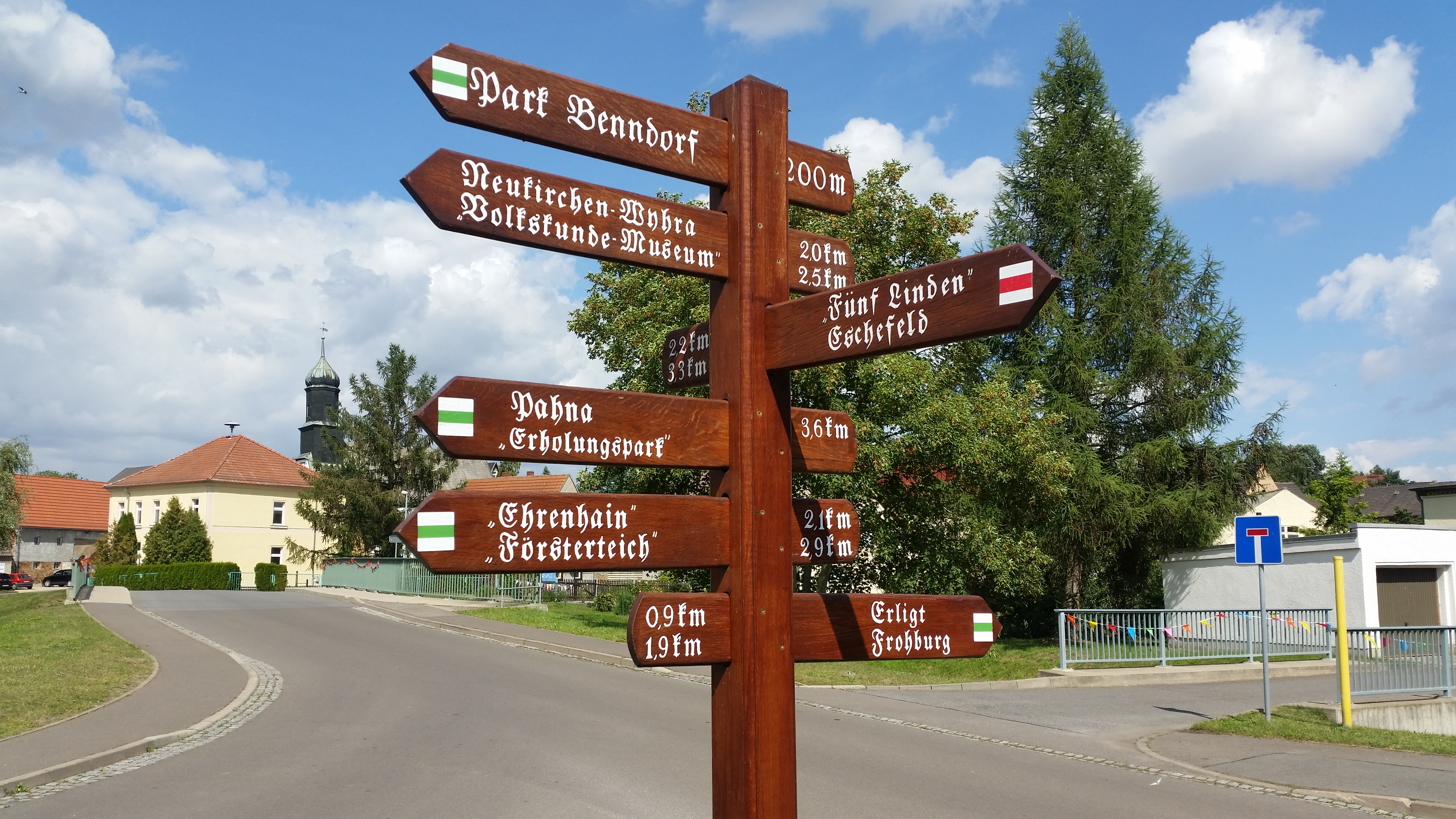
Hiking sign at the village square

Benndorf is connected to many hiking and biking paths.

=== Neighborhood ===
Benndorf is bordered by the following neighborhoods (clockwise, starting from the north): Bubendorf, Frohburg, Eschefeld, Pahna and Wyhra.

== History ==
Benndorf Castle

See also History of Benndorf (Frohburg).

The village was first mentioned in a document in 1216. It was independent until 1 January 1997 when Benndorf was incorporated into the city Frohburg.

== Population and demographics ==
Year	population
1551	51
1764	92
1834	413
1871	427
1890	437
1910	577
1925	594
1929	517
1939	544
1946	709
1971	492
1998	456
1999	475
2000	485
2001	487
2002	486
2003	483
2004	479
2005	482
2006	467
2007	474
2008	463
2009	459
2010	461
2011	453
2012	435
2013	431
2014	436
2016	430

== Attractions ==
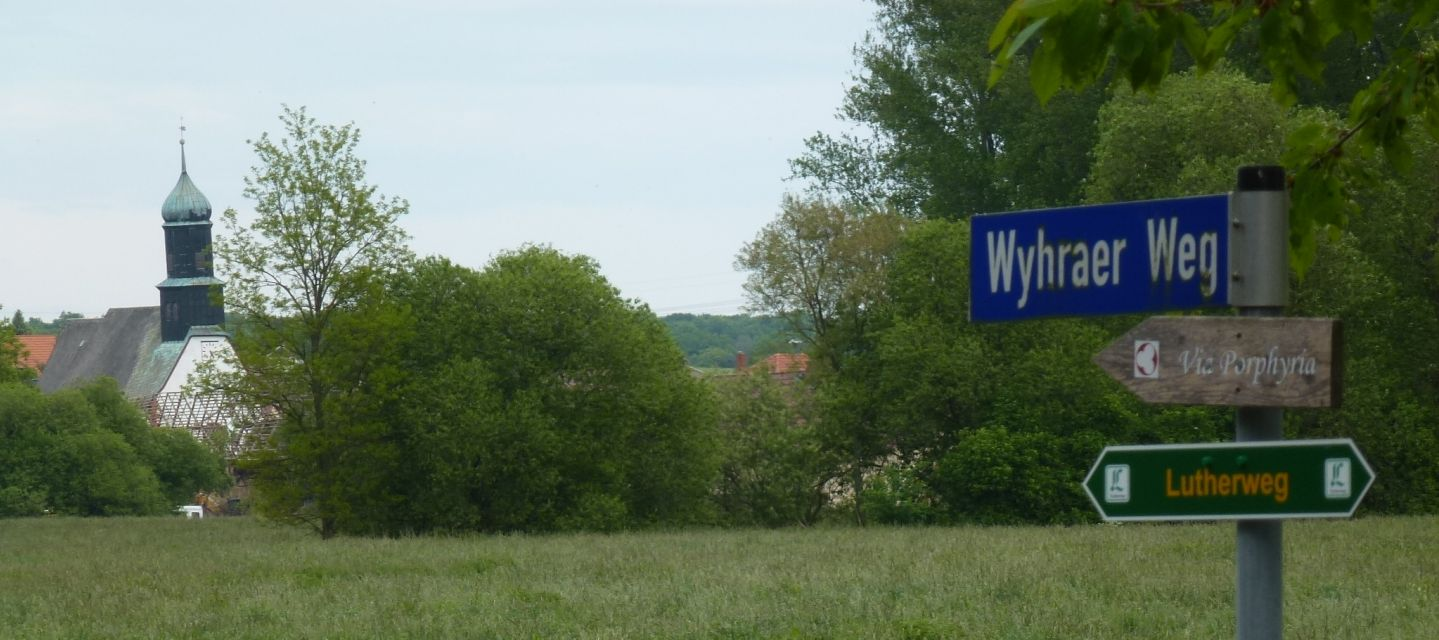
Luther-Way near Benndorf

- Village church Benndorf, first mentioned in 1352
- Manor buildings
- Archway
- Castle Park with lines of the former castle and newly designed fountain
- Orangerie

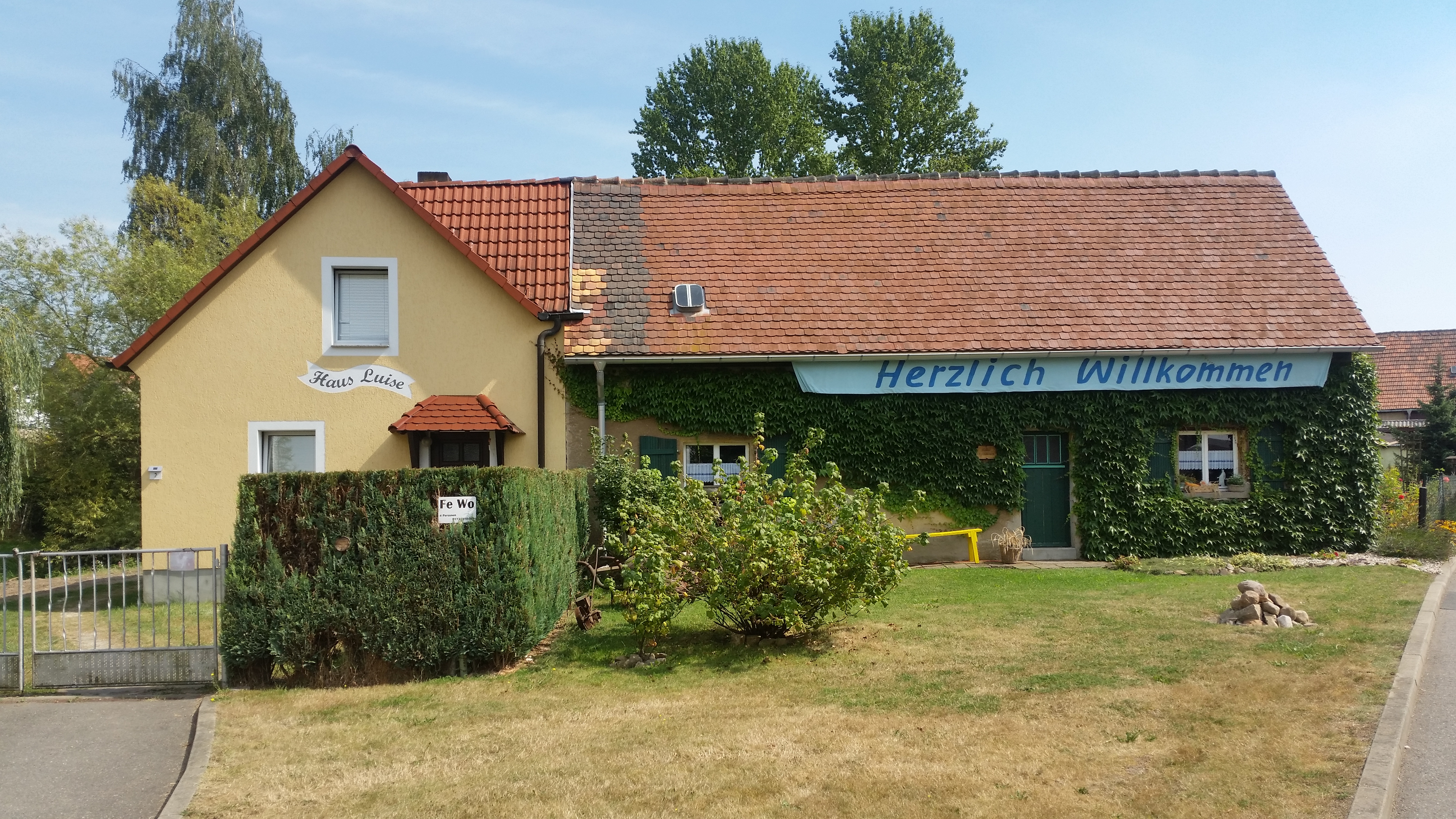
The small museum in Benndorf

- The small village museum on the island
- Mill
- Gatehouse of the former four-page court Kaube, today nursing station
- Truss house at the village square

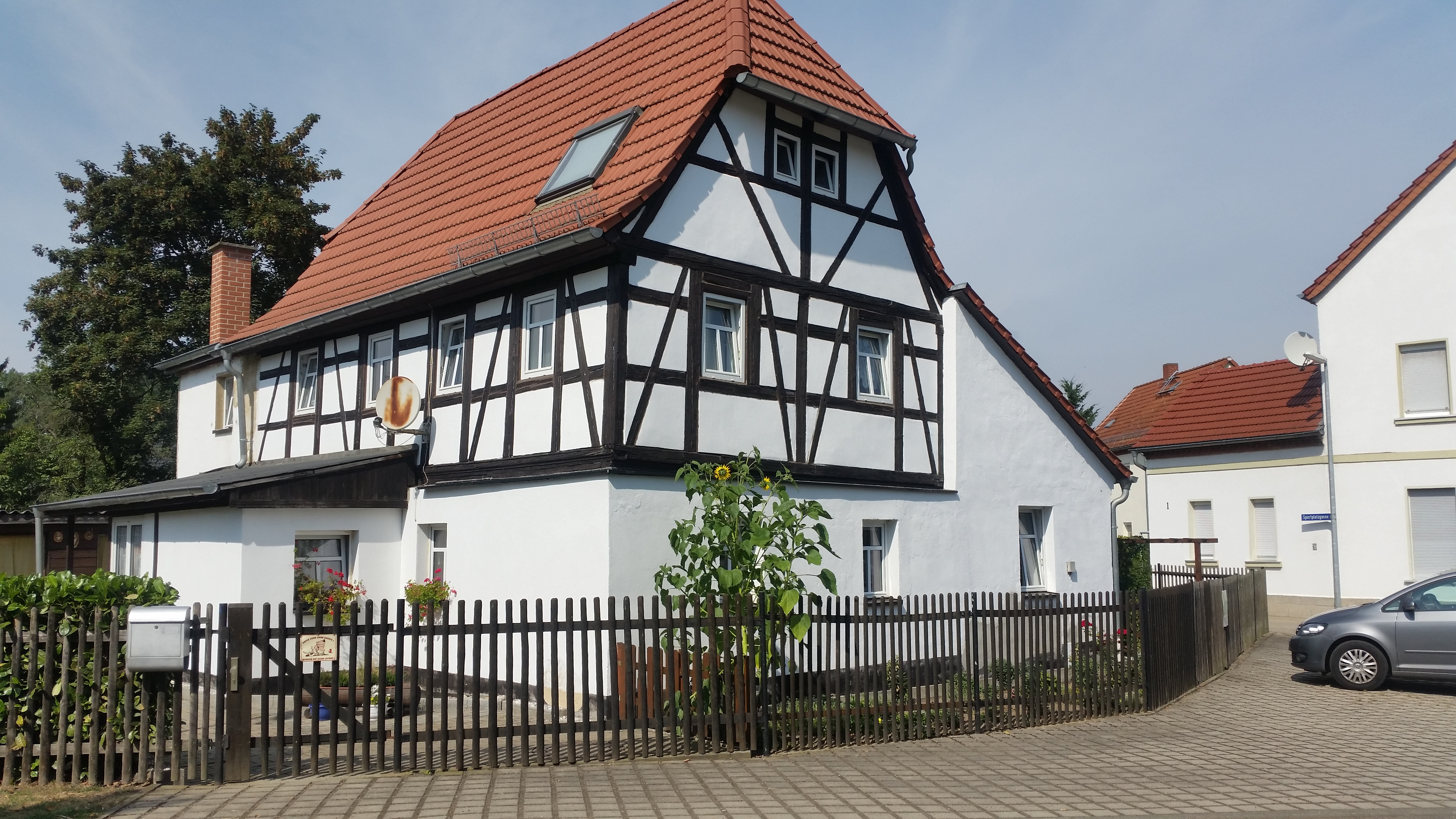
truss house at the village square

- The "alley" in their entirety
- Tudor style house A. Kobsch
- Community Centre (former village school from 1899)
- The Maisterlabyrinth, a corn maze near the road to Bubendorf (Open from July to September)
- The Luther-Hiking-Way between Borna and Gnandstein performs Benndorf

=== Church ===
In Benndorf is a Lutheran Church, which belongs since 2000 to parish Frohburg.

The oldest message about the church dates back to 1352. Until the year 1524 the Bergkloster of Chemnitz had the patronage. The Church to Benndorf was under his abbot. Only under the last abbot Hilary has the monastery lost this law. Since Benndorf belonged to Electorate of Saxony, Luther's teaching already early find input. Since then the Benndorf Church is evangelical.

The present church building was erected around the year 1500. In 1863, the internal of the church was renovated extensively. Another renovation took place from 1980 to 1983.

The altar, dating from 1506, consists of a central shrine and two wings. The central shrine contains the carved in wood and brightly painted figures of Saint George, Maria with the child and the Saint Barbara. On the wings are in groups of 3 the 12 Apostle. The altar is, as well as the one in Eschefeld, which it is very similar to the work, of an Altenburg art carving school.

The bells (three bronze bells) was poured around 1500. The treasures of the church include the organ of Urban Kreutzbach from Borna, which was built in the redesign 1863.

There is a memorial plaque for the First World War fallen soldiers on the north side of the church.

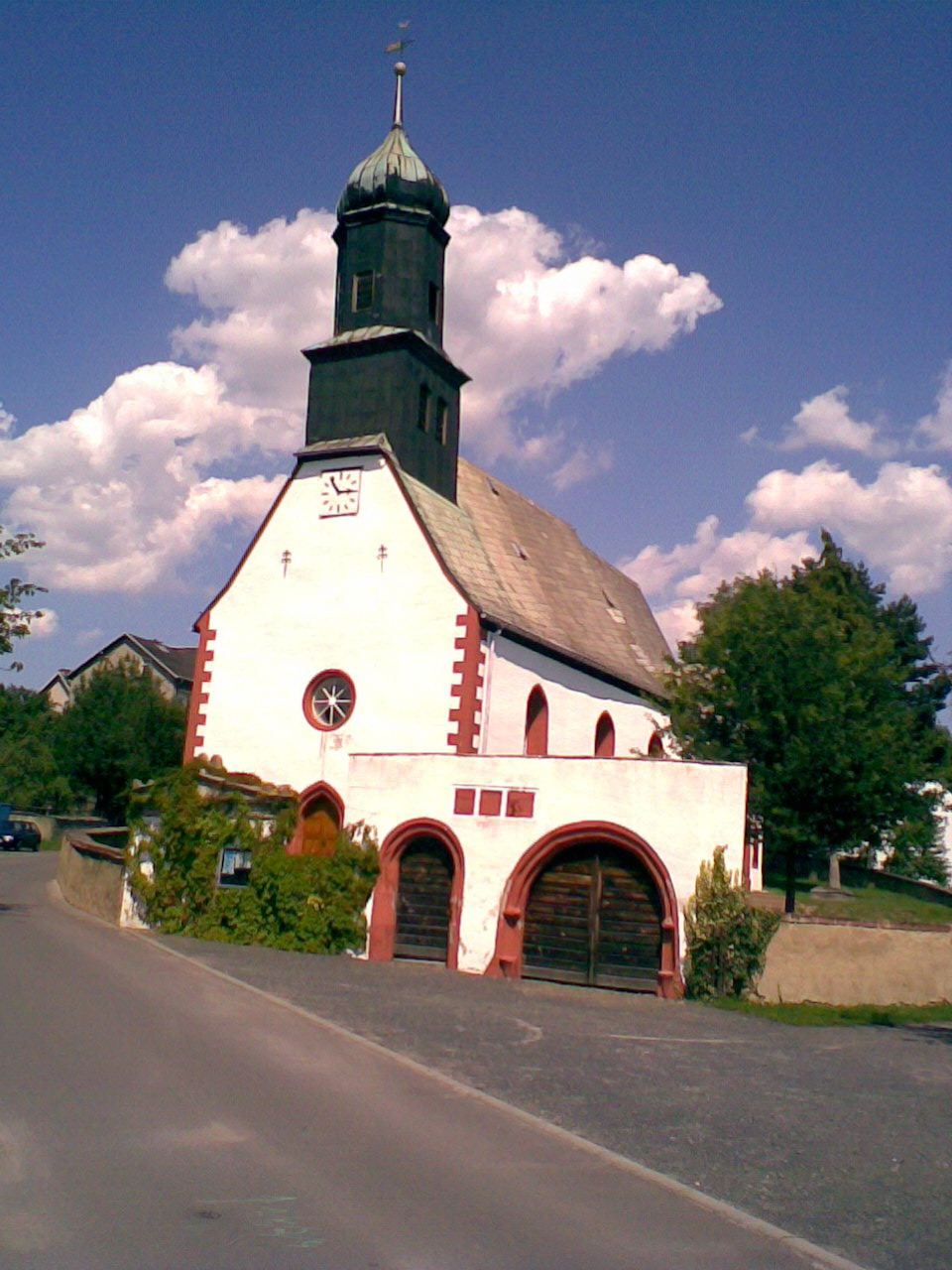
village church

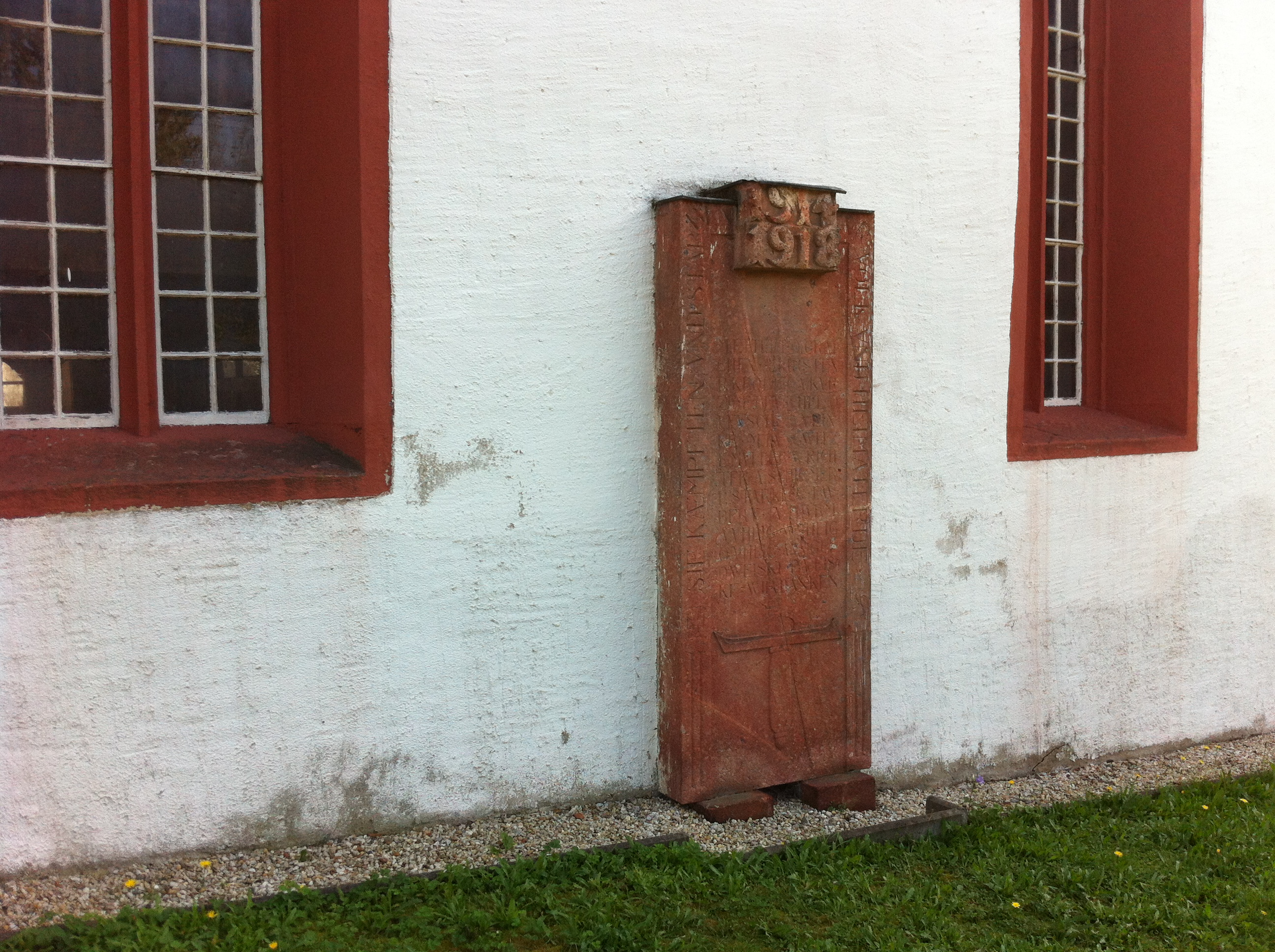
memorial plaque to the victims of World War I at the church Benndorf

List of pastor to Benndorf

year	pastor	note
1526	Nikolaus Thümerer	First Protestant and married priest
1533	Peter Kreutzer	
1553	Christoph Spurwert	ordained in 1553 to Weimar
1563	Bartholomäus Spurberg	Who signed the Concord
1583	Georgius Schrey	
1632	David Höckner	Died on January 5, 1633, the plague
1633	Christian Engelmann	
1638	Johannes Sartorius (Schneider)	
1654	Joachim Michaelis	
1683	M. Phillip Bernhard Eck	Was retained by Lucka
1686	Georg Friedrich Tschirpe	Came in 1695 to Osterfeld
1695	Andreas Teucher	
1729	Johann Christian Prell	
1739	Christoph Graube	
1744	M. Heinrich Salomon Hermann	Went 1764 as archdeacon for Borna
1764	Johann Christian Pietsch	
1781	Carl August Heinrich Flemming	Went as a deacon to Bad Lausick
1791	M. Carl Christoph Schirlitz	Got the rectory Burgstädt with Göritz at Querfurt
1801	Johann Christian Tenne	became pastor of Großbardau
1819	M. Heinrich August Schreyer	
1831	Konrad Julius Thieme	Longest tenure here, lived as Emeritus in Frohburg
1870	Friedrich Moritz Fritzsche	As a pastor for Bocka appointed
1875	Johannes Weichert	lived as Emeritus in Dresden
1895	Paul Hugo Reinhold	Came from Gersdorf near Leisnig
1906	Martin Reismuth	
1947	Hermann Albrecht	
1955	Manfred Schönfelder	
1957	Gottfried Buch	
1965	Johann Christian von Kölichen	buried beside the church

Since 1974, the parish Benndorf is co-managed by Frohburg. The church is located at the beginning of the road "Bubendorfer Straße". In the opposite house No. 2 was located earlier the ministry.

=== Mill ===
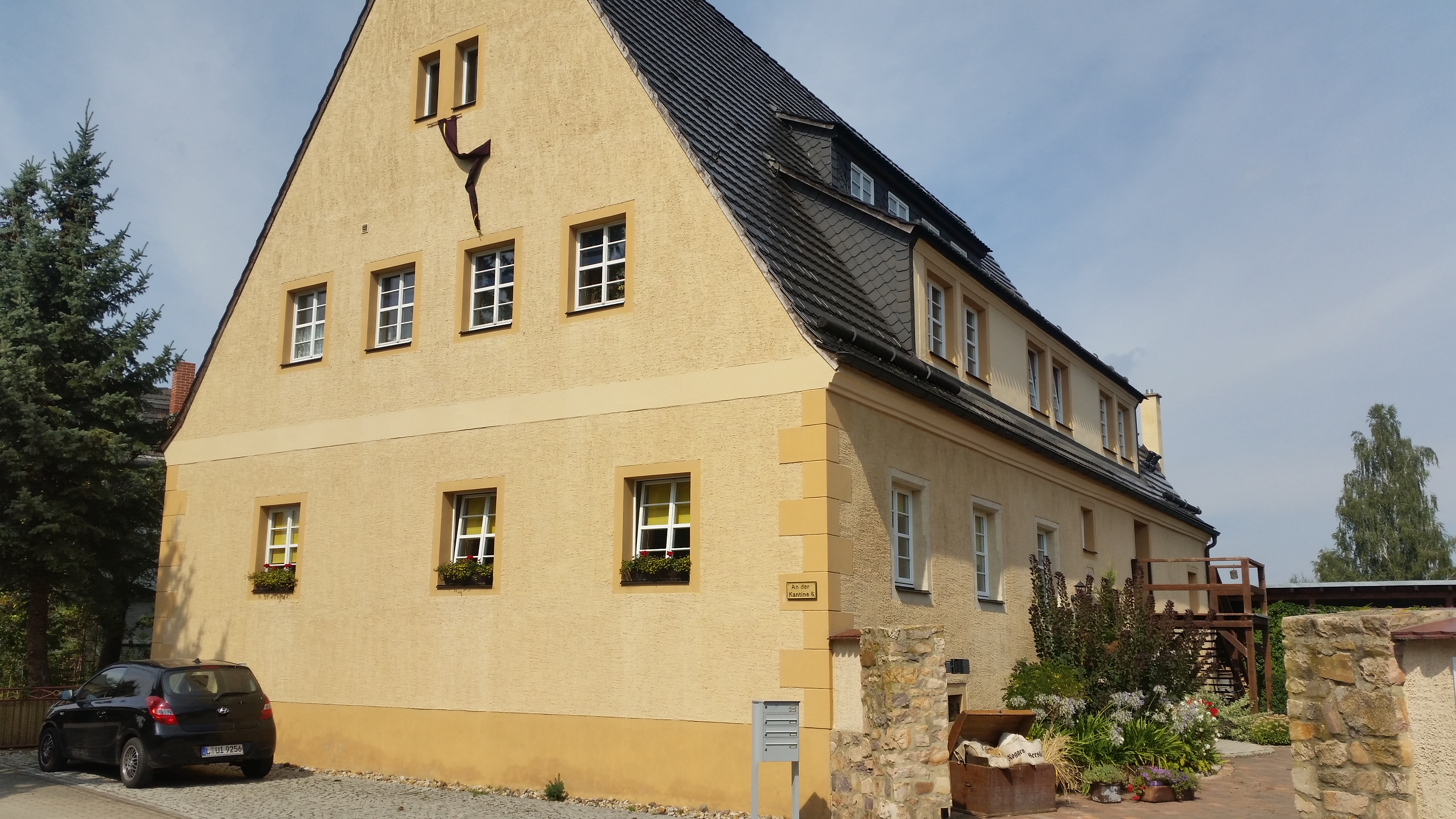
mill building in 2016

The mill was once built by monks from the Merseburg pen. For the first time it is mentioned in documents in the year 1365. Margrave Frederick certain then that the mill had to deliver annually a small sum of money, a lamb belly, a loaf of bread and two capons to certain matins after Frohburg.
Earlier on the year of construction remembered a mounted above the door of the mill building date: 1365. The above Inappropriate Crest is the family of Wrangel. It is surrounded by the letters IMDHT, be interpreted as follows: H (oc), I (n), M (anu), D (omini), T (utiseemum), which means "the mill is safest in the hands of God" is intended to mean.
Until 1500 there was darkness over the fate of the mill. They should in the Hussite wars have been destroyed with the village Benndorf and rebuilt after. Then hinted a ledge of fired bricks, which is said to have pulled around the building.
Former owners were the lords of Kreutzen and Nickel von Techwitz from Frohburg, later, Mr. von Einsiedel in Benndorf which the mill each leased.
1921 burned sheds and stables and 1925 the main building down, after which the mill was rebuilt. 1935 it leased from Georg Bufe. In 1940/41 there was a modernization, in a modern Francis turbine was built for its own power generation. The work was performed by French prisoners of war.
1945 was VdgB – BHG of Saxony owner of the mill. In 1957 she was communal property. From 1958, the mill belonged to the LPG "Free farmers Benndorf". Miller was Artur Abendroth. In 1968 the mill has been set.
Currently, the family Scheffler owns the mill building, which also serves as the headquarters of their construction company and was extensively restored and modernized.

The mill is located at the address "An der Kantine 6".

=== Forge ===
The owner of the smithy.

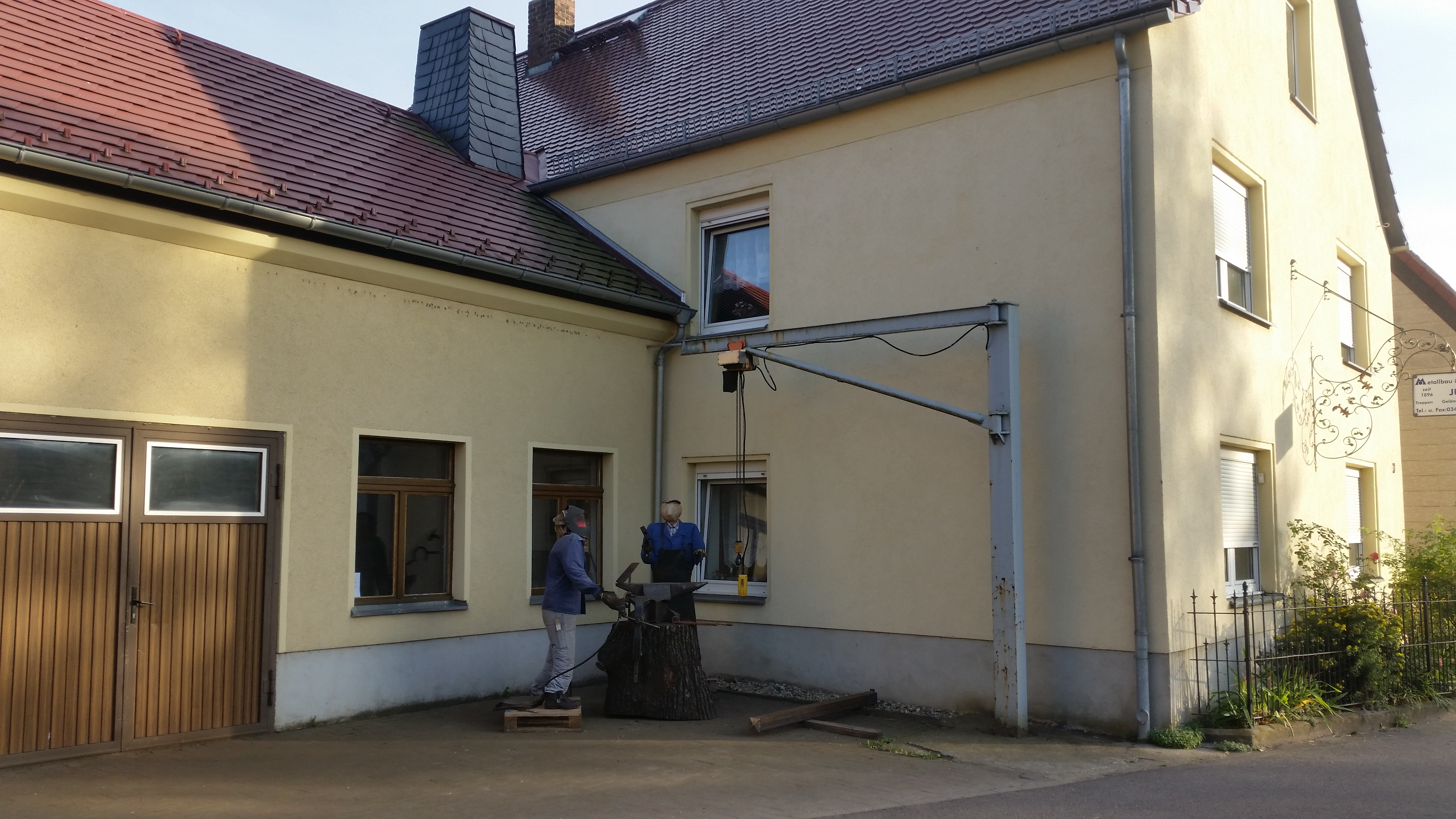
the Benndorf forge

Jahr	smith	note
1600	Peter Gräfe	
1623	Michael Gräfe	
1678	Christoph Kurz	
1711	Hans Georg Kurz	Bought the forge on May 9, 1711, by his father.
1748	Hans Christoph Meißner	Sold forging on November 27, 1769, to his son for 300 taler. At the Benndorfer court are then 17 taler purchase money has been paid.
1769	Gottfried Mäder	
1799	Andreas Heinicke	He is called master and farrier. He buys on December 11, 1799, three arable field in the Benndorfer corridor.
1843	Johann Gottlob Mäder	He is in 1843 cited as owner of the smithy in the instrument of detachment of Frone and called for the first time "master". In the 1842 scale Ledger school to Benndorf he is called "blacksmith and armorer". He sent 7 children in the Benndorf school. In 1845 he built the now still standing forging, the more to the house next door (then Zschammer) state, was burnt.
1857	Schneiderheinze	
1882	Gustav Adolf Brauer	He has grown the smithy.
1895	Hermann Alwin Jurich	He bought the forge on March 1, 1895, for 18,000 marks.
1922	Alwin Alfred Jurich	Took over on 1 December 1922, the smithy of his father. He has expanded the workshop and 1926, re-covered buildings.
1956	Rolf Jurich	Took over on 26 October 1956, the smithy of his father.
1988	Wolfgang Jurich	Took over on 1 December 1988, the smithy of his father.

The forge is today still in operation. After the incorporation of Eulatal to Frohburg the former so called road "Frohburger Straße" in Benndorf has been renamed and is now called "An der Schmiede" (at the smithy). The building is located at number 3.

=== Archway ===
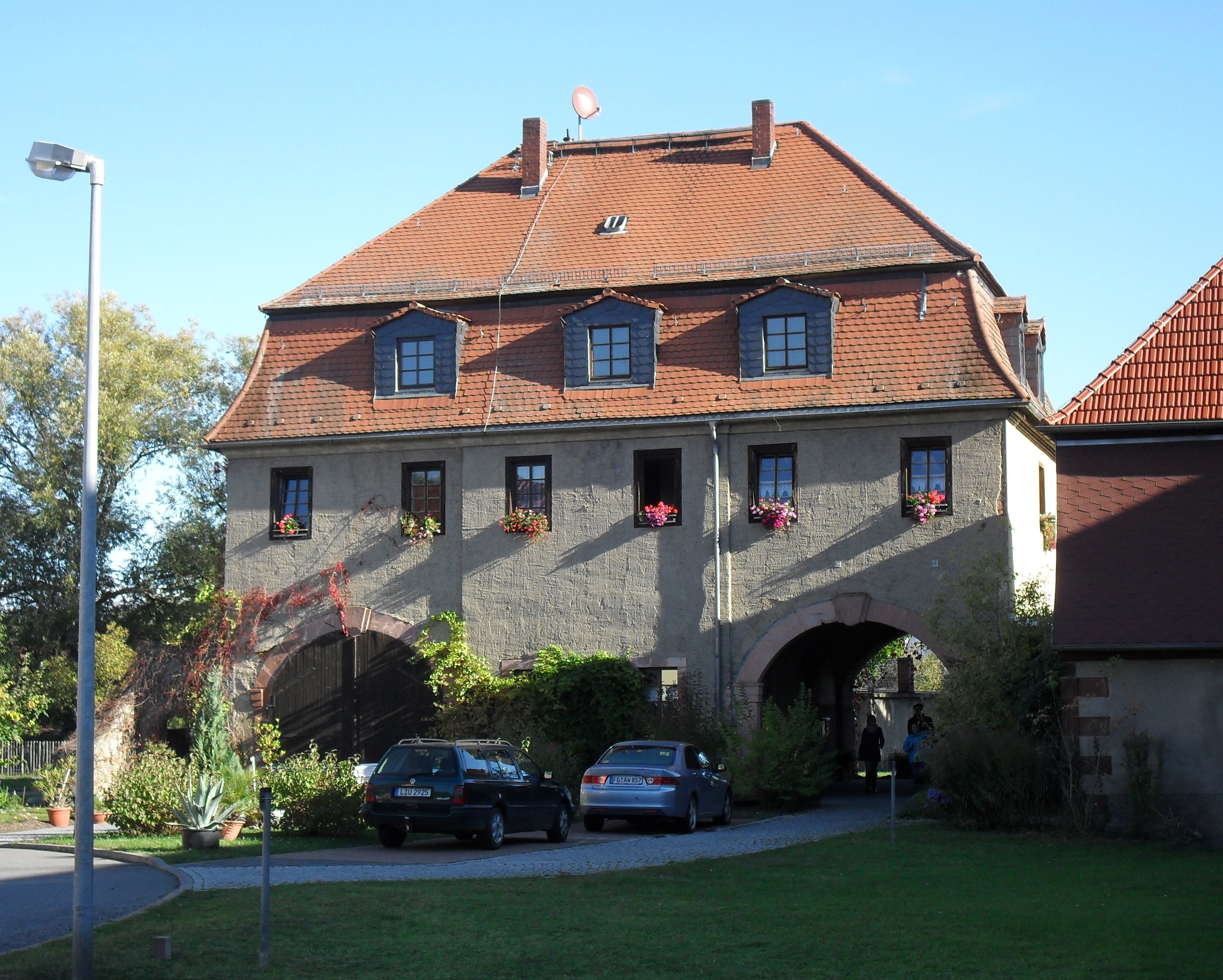
the archway

The gatehouse Benndorf (the arch) is a two-storey gatehouse with slightly drawn early Mittelrisalit and Mansardwalmdach, built in the typical Baroque of the 18th century. After this building, the street is named from the village square to the manor: "Zum Torbogen" (For archway). The gatehouse was formed for centuries the link between manor and village and separated at the same time in 1856, the independent legal districts "Rittergut Benndorf" and "village community Benndorf".
Until the dissolution of the Voluntary Fire Brigade the Benndorf fire engine was parked here in the gatehouse and housed the equipment for the comrades. In 2012 the building changed from municipal to private ownership

=== School ===
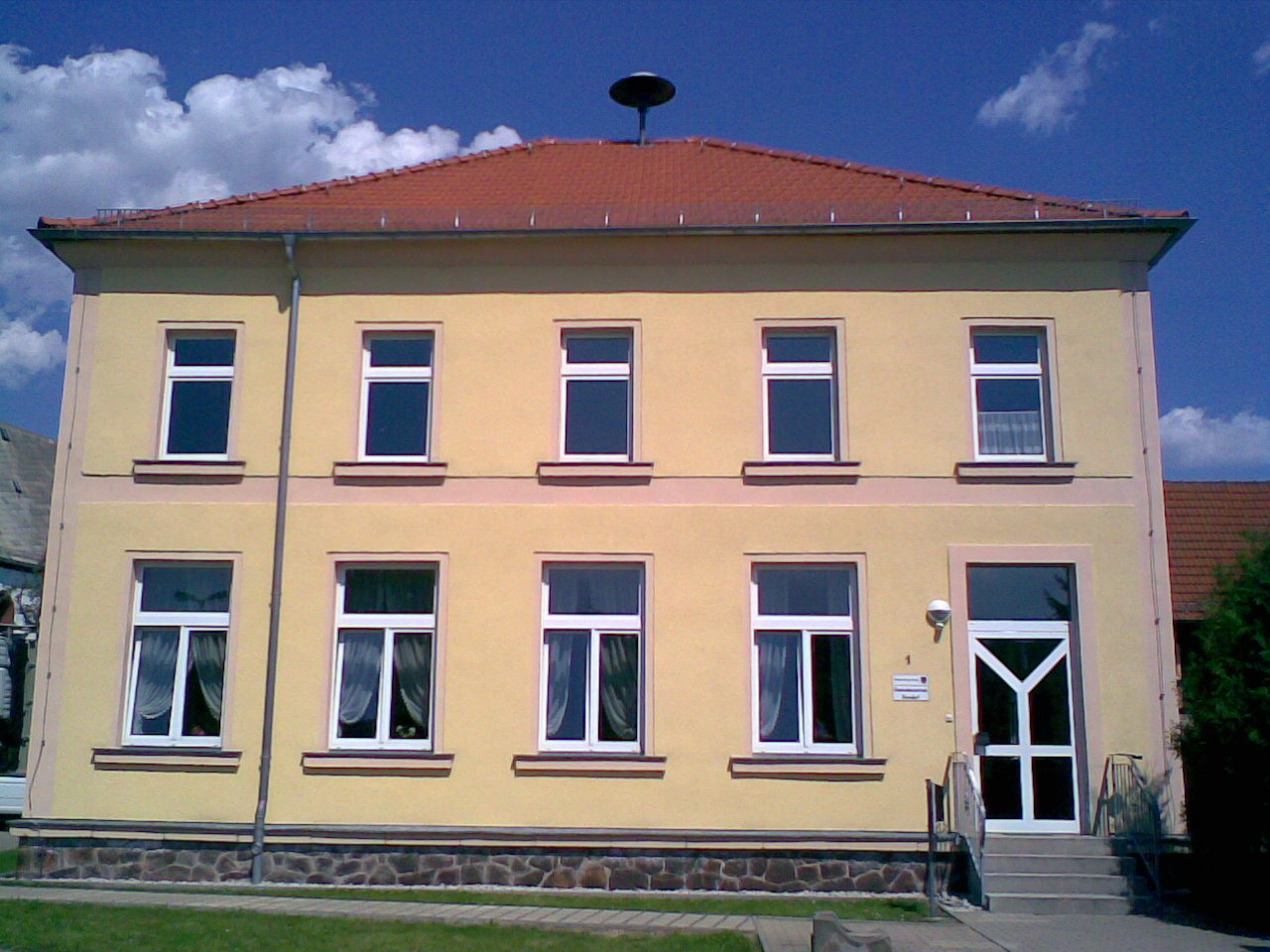
Former Benndorf school

The school building of Benndorf was built in 1899 and was used until 1970 in as such. After that, the students had to go Nenkersdorf or Frohburg. The building was then only the after-school club. Meanwhile, the building is used as a community center. On the ground floor there is a large function room with a small kitchen and toilet. Usage is both of the local clubs and private. Upstairs a rented apartment has arisen. Nearby is located the public playground and a barbecue grill. On the roof of the building a siren is attached.
The Benndorf children go to daycare "Stork's nest" and "sparrow's nest" in Frohburg and the "Rainbow Country" Greifenhain and the "Villa Kunterbunt" in Eschefeld.
The primary school children are taught in the Frohburg primary school. Thither there is a direct connection to the school bus. In addition, can be visited there, the school care centers "Sly Foxes" and "The Einstein". From the fifth grade are high school "Maxim Gorky" in Frohburg and the Gymnasium "Am Breiten Teich" in Borna, the "International Business School" in Geithain, the "Johannes-Mathesius-Gymnasium" in Rochlitz, the "Freies Gymnasium" in Penig and the "Christian Spalatin Gymnasium" in Altenburg to selection.
Upcoming colleges and universities are located in Leipzig, Mittweida, Chemnitz and Zwickau.

== Organizations ==
As of 2020, the following clubs and organisations operate in Benndorf:

- Church choir Benndorf
- Male Choir "Germania" Benndorf
- Posaunenchor Benndorf / Bubendorf
- Förderverein Rittergut Benndorf
- Dartclub Benndorf

Every year at the first weekend in September, the joint Benndorf summer festival and on December 6, the traditional feast of St. Nicholas take place.

== Literature ==
Richard Steche: Benndorf. In: Beschreibende Darstellung der älteren Bau- und Kunstdenkmäler des Königreichs Sachsen, 15. Volume: Amtshauptmannschaft Borna. C. C. Meinhold, Dresden, 1891, p. 5.
