= Oberwiera =

- Municipality
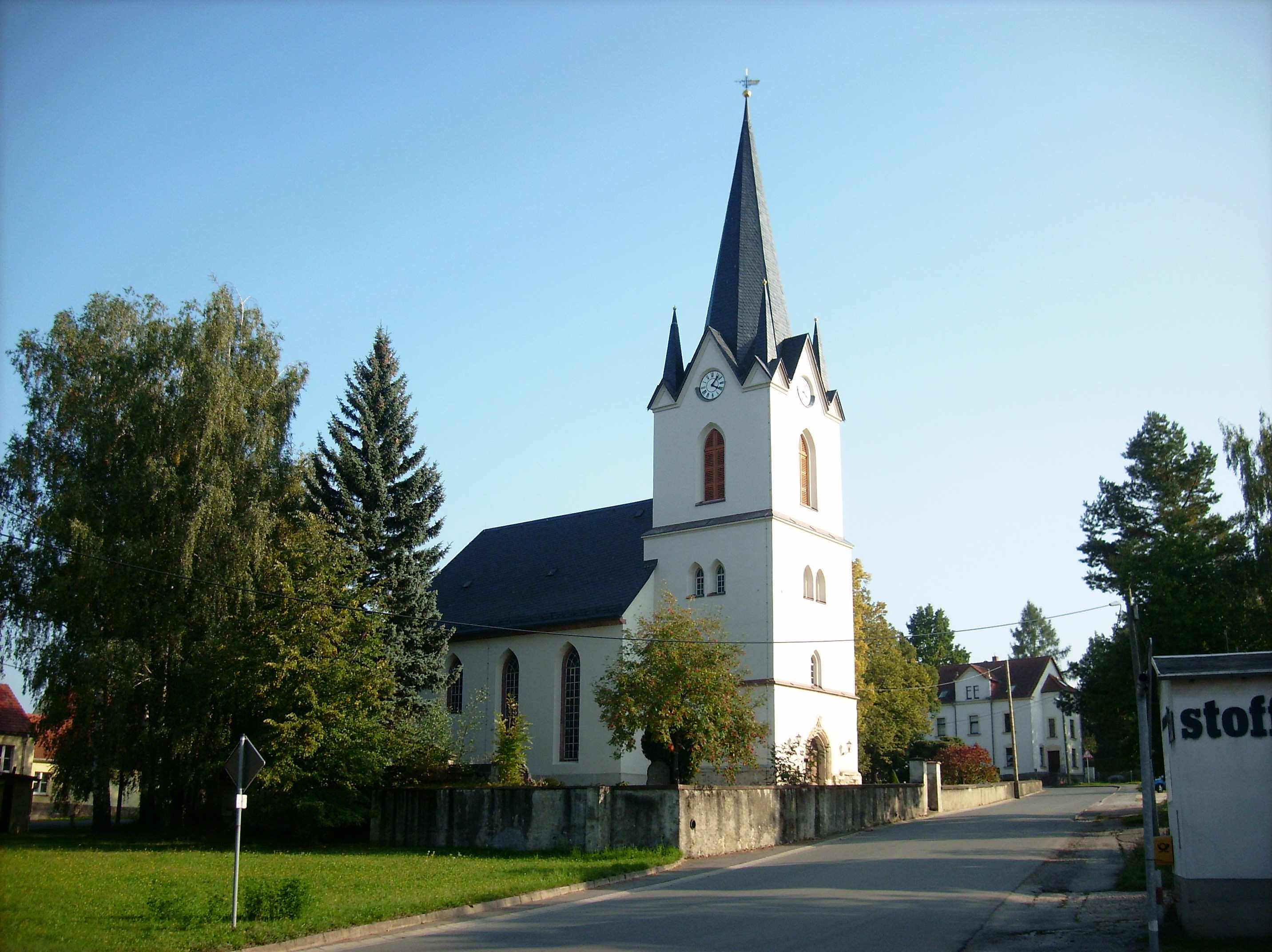
- Church

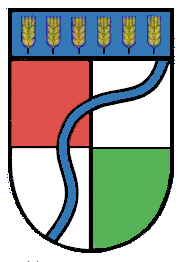
- Coat of arms

- Location of Oberwiera within Zwickau district
- Interactive map of Oberwiera
- Location within Germany Location within Saxony
- Coordinates: 50°53′29″N 12°32′14″E
- Country: Germany
- State: Saxony
- District: Zwickau
- Subdivisions: 6

Government
  - Mayor (2019–26): Holger Quellmalz

Area
  - Total: 14.33 km^{2} (5.53 sq mi)
- Elevation: 268 m (879 ft)

Population (2025-12-31)
  - Total: 1,023
  - Density: 71.39/km^{2} (184.9/sq mi)
- Time zone: UTC+01:00 (CET)
  - Summer (DST): UTC+02:00 (CEST)
- Postal codes: 08396
- Dialling codes: 037608
- Vehicle registration: Z
- Website: www.gemeindeoberwiera.de

Oberwiera is a municipality in the district of Zwickau in Saxony in Germany. Oberwiera has the following districts: Harthau, Neukirchen, Niederwiera, Oberwiera, Röhrsdorf and Wickersdorf. Around half of the population lives in the main district of Oberwiera.

Municipalities around Oberwiere are Remse, Schönberg and the city of Waldenburg as well as Nobitz and Ziegelheim in Thuringia.

== History ==
Oberwiera was mentioned the first time in 1254 A.D. Therefore Oberwiera is as old as its neighbor city Waldenburg.
