= History of Benndorf (Frohburg) =

Benndorf is a small village in Germany, first mentioned in 1216. It was independent until 1 January 1997 when Benndorf was incorporated into the city of Frohburg.

== Former names ==
| year | name | note |
|---|---|---|
| 1216 | Bennendorf | First mention |
| 1350 | Bendorf, Bunendorf | |
| 1526 | Penndorf | |

== 13th century ==
Benndorf Castle

In 1216 in a document next to Henry the Younger and Henry the Elder of Corna (Kohren) and Siegfried of Zedtlitz also called a Hugo von Bennendorf as a witness, a knight whose ancestors under Wiprecht of Groitzsch were settled. They came from Franconia. There was also a village Benndorf, now Kaltenbrunn. A Gnanno of Benndorf to the monastery Benz more goods, a Adelbert is called by Benndorf as a witness. 1233 are named as owners of Benndorf Dither List and Siegfried List. The family moved to Windischleuba. With family List the number of those owners begins possessed the centuries Frohburg and Benndorf.

== 14th century ==
In 1350 has Gunegunde, the stern knight de Trenowe (of Thräna) wife, the Rödichen, freight and charges in Benndorf.
Dietrich von List transfers in 1352, the patronage right on the church Benndorf the mountain monastery Chemnitz. In 1362 the Benndorf mill was built and first mentioned in 1365.

== 15th century ==
On June 28, 1413, borrows Markgraf Wilhelm II to the stern Apel and Michael Brothers of Bresen the Frohburg Castle, the grove behind the castle, the town Frohburg half, the neck Court in the villages Greifenhain, Eschefeld and Benndorf. For the year 1420 are in a buying bonds, which is located in the castle archive to Frohburg, as the owner of Benndorf Cunrad and Frutzsche (Fritz) called Bresen. They sold then to her cousin Caspar von Bresen on Frohburg a wood which called Borkisbach (Burkhardt Bach). In 1485 Johann sold by Bresen on Benndorf a piece of wood to Heinrich von Einsiedel in Gnandstein.
Around the year 1500, the Benndorf church was built.

== 16th century ==
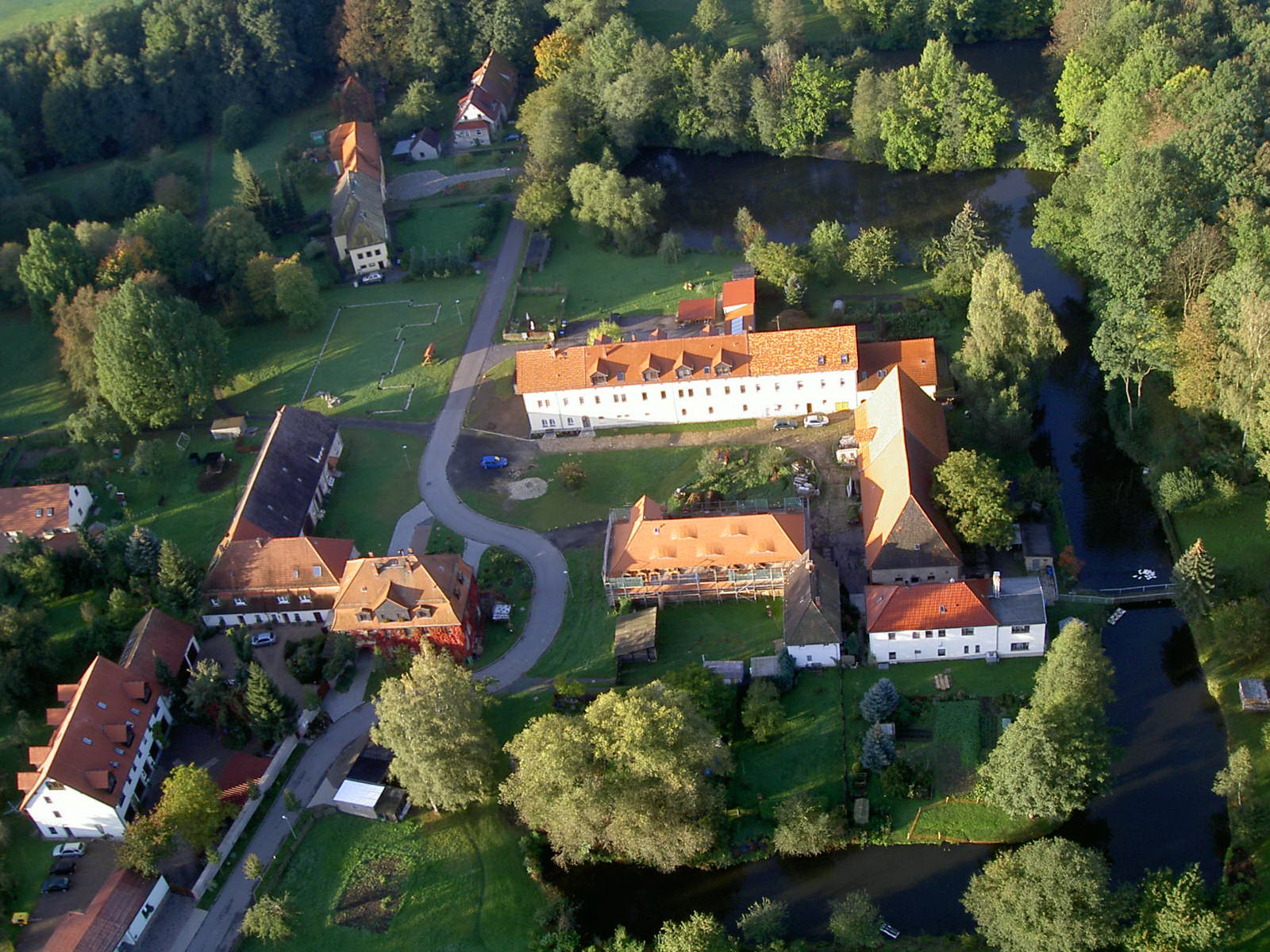
photo from the air

In Visitation protocol from 1533 Caspar von Mergenthal and Rudolf von Bunaw be named as owner Benndorf. Caspar von Minkwitz met us on 1535 Benndorf. 1540 sold this Frohburg and Benndorf "sessig on Kossern" Nickel of Techwitz. This is on October 30, 1542, by the Ernestine Electors Johann Friedrich, in turn, by the bailiff of Altenburg, admonished to comply with its pecuniary obligations to the pastor of Benndorf.

Already in 1549 sold Nickel of Techwitz the manors Frohburg and Benndorf because overindebted, to Melchior von Kreutzen. The purchase contract is the Albertine Elector Moritz signed with. Melchior von Kreutzen died "to Frohburg at his castle by Ursula, which was October 24, 1555 at 9:00 am," so now states that at the western porch of Frohburger Church brazen grave slab with Kreutzer almost life-size figure. His son and successor Bernhard von Kreutzen did not come out of the financial difficulties, so that it in 1600 "on the Schneeberg" retired and his possessions to his cousin Melchior von Kreutzen from the Prussian line left, of them, however, already in 1602 ceded to his son Christoph von Kreutzen. But this passed away much too early. Under his skillful hand the two goods could also have financially flourish again. With high honors, in the presence of Duke Johann Georg he was buried on 2 October 1609. His widow managed from 1609, goods with Wolf von Kreutzen on Ballstädt and Henry Friesen on Rötha for her only son Melchior, who receives but transferred deeply in debt these goods. Perhaps to the financial worries sake he enlists and is probably also the war like, because on January 23, 1630, enters his widow Sabine (from the house of Priessnitz Einsiedel) Frohburg to creditors of her husband from, Either under this widow Sabine von Kreutzen or still alive her husband Melchior von Kreutzen Benndorf must have been sold. Thus, the separation of freight and Benndorf Frohburg has occurred.

== 17th century ==
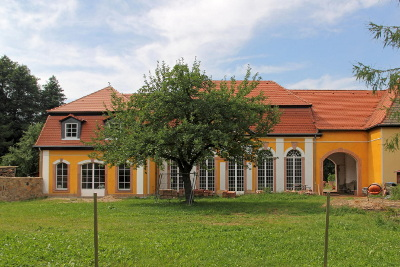
Orangerie

1625 Georg Berger is mentioned as the owner of the stately "Erbschenke" to Benndorf. The widow of Christoph von Kreutzen sold Frohburg to creditors of her husband. This led to a separation of goods Benndorf and Frohburg. In 1633 134 people died in Benndorf of the plague (nearly one third of the population).
At the beginning of the 17th century Benndorf is in possession of the lords of Ende, of which Wolf was said to be a good farmer and of Ende (from the album of the manors of Saxony). To mention here that in 1600 in Frohburg – not in the castle – a noble family Georg Ende lived. In manor archive is a larger piece files, overwrite "Acta Judicialia from 1755". Already on 20 January 1669 writes there on page 52 Eberhard sleep. He called on the same side "of the right doctor and practiko and hereditary lord on Benndorf". As is apparent from the documents listed above, many memories and additions made themselves necessary at this time because of the forced labors and taxes. The vassals wanted to appear to provide relief, which is to be understood as they were depleted by the not distant past 30-year war. Because of the duties led the farmers with the landowners a process they are already lost in 1675 in front of the Supreme Court to Leipzig. Your revision was on June 14, 1676, again discarded. You turned to the Court of Appeal of the Elector of Saxony in Magdeburg. But eventually it came to a comparison between the two parties, since a change of ownership had occurred in Manor Benndorf. In 1676 two brothers, namely the "Princely Saxon court and Justitionsrat to Altenburg" Johann Caspar Hendrich and the "Princely Saxon Landrentmeister to Coburg" Johann Friedrich Hendrich Men on Benndorf are. They are led in the above-mentioned document on page 55 left. The two brothers had, in turn, to litigate against the widow of the late tensioner George foreman who refused to pay the "Hauptlehnwahr" (5% royalty of the basic value in case of death) because it this good with her daughter that a certain Georg Eidner had married, together wanted to continue farming. The process has also been performed in front of the King's Bench in Leipzig and ended with an amicable settlement (pp 56 and 57 of the official document). After the date, which carries the official document, the two brothers must have still been the owner of the manor on June 12, 1680.
1688 buys the Registrar of Pöllnitz Benndorf. In this family owned Benndorf was continuously until 1811.

== 18th century ==
1721 Friedrich Carl von Pöllnitz started to build the now-indicated with its foundations Castle Benndorf.

== 19th century ==
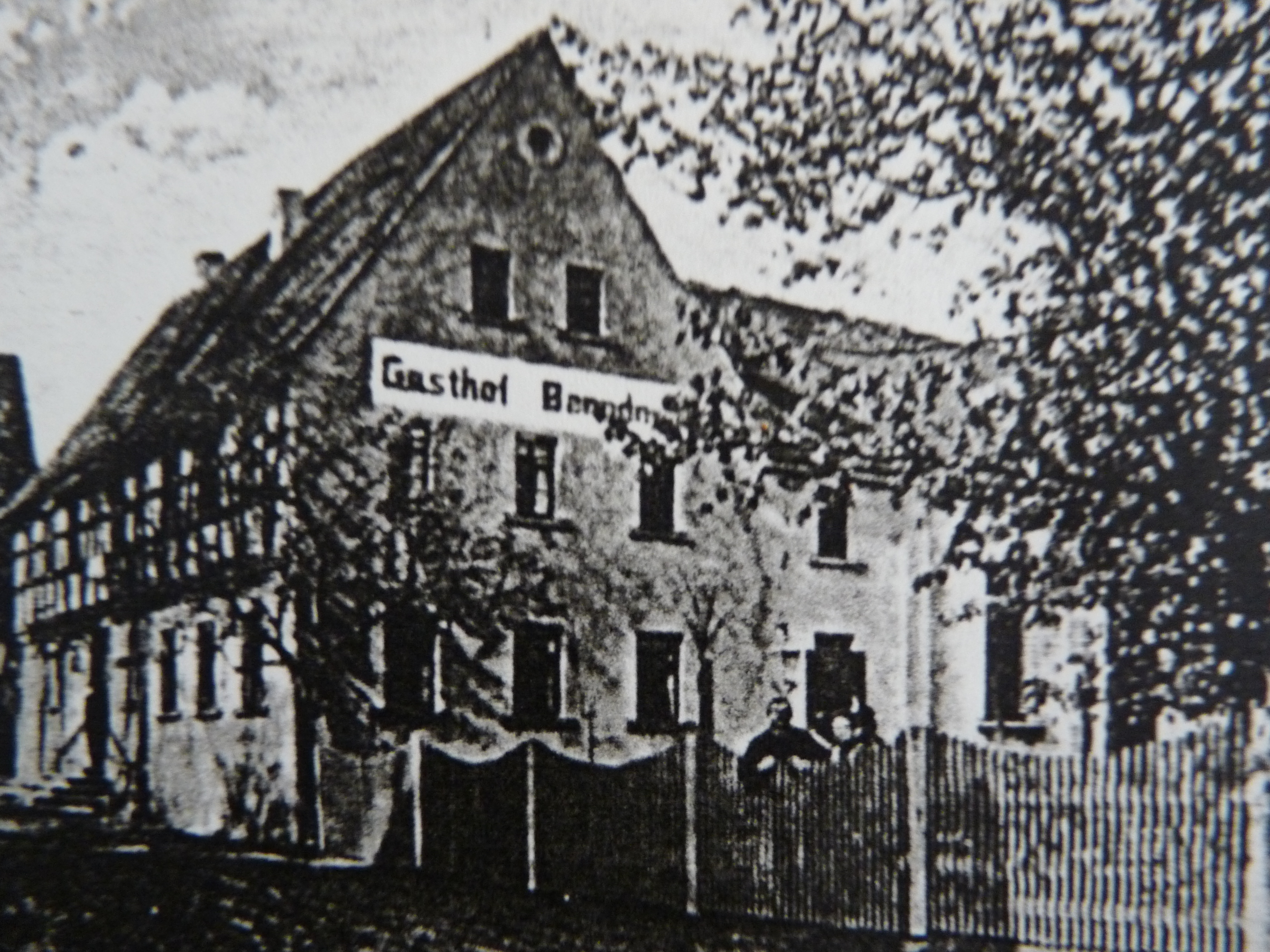
Benndorf Inn

In 1811, the forestry clerk was Klinkhardt owner Benndorfs. His successor in 1818 was Prof. Dr. Ritter Eichstädt, professor at the University of Jena. He is buried in Benndorf. He was followed in 1848 his daughter Ida Karolina, the first marriage with a man of Einsiedel, was married in second marriage with Captain Brandt von Lindau. She is also buried in Benndorf. That same year, the distillery was built in the manor. 1864 opened the lignite plant "Himmelreich" in Bubendorf and 1884 Einsiedel's coal plants. At this time Benndorf has 517 inhabitants and 22 farmsteads. By 1890, the manor had its own brewery and the brewing right. The innkeeper to Benndorf could pour only beer from the manor brewery.
The last owner Benndorfs follows 1893 son of Ida Karolina from his first marriage, Kurt Heinrich Hildebrand Alexis von Einsiedel, Royal Saxon Colonel A.D.

== 20th century ==
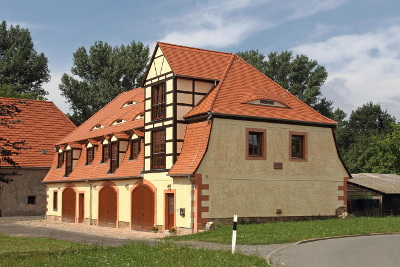
distillery

In 1908 drilling for a second drinking fountain water be carried out on 16 July. 1911 reign arge abuses in the school system: 115-119 teach students in two classes of one teacher. The seats are no longer sufficient in the second grade, so that some students have to stand.

List of the fallen at world war I:

| rank | name | age | born | place of birth | died | place | unit |
|---|---|---|---|---|---|---|---|
| soldier | Emil Arthur Uhlig | 31 | 17 July 1884 | Benndorf | 02 September 1916 | near Zamoscie (Russia) in the battle of Njemen | 12. Komp. Inf.-Regt. 354 |
| sergeant | Albin Otto Uhlig | 22 | 01 December 1893 | Frohburg | 24 March 1916 | south of the Caurieres-Forrest (France) | 2. Komp. Inf.-Regt. 107 |
| soldier | Otto Paul Weiske | 21 | 23 January 1893 | Benndorf | 24 October 1914 | west of Lille (France) | 4. Komp. Inf.-Regt. 179 |
| soldier | Emil Arthur Vogel | 31 | 17 June 1885 | Frohburg | 12 November 1916 | at the Monte-lui-Popovice (Romania) | |
| soldier | Arno Arthur Linke | 23 | 30 January 1894 | Benndorf | 15 April 1917 | south of Aubérive (France) | 6. Komp. Inf.-Regt. 107 |
| soldier | Oskar Max Lungwitz | 30 | 01 October 1886 | Flößberg | 01 July 1917 | south-east of Brzezany (France) | 6. Komp. Res.-Inf.-Regt. 107 |
| soldier | Otto Weiske | 22 | 14 January 1895 | Benndorf | 14 November 1917 | east of Monchy at the Artois (Frankreich) | |
| corporal | Albin Richard Taubert | 37 | 27 November 1880 | Benndorf | 15 September 1918 | near Bourlon (France) | Fuhrpark-Kolonne Nr. 719 |
| sergeant | Alfred Otto Leuschel | 23 | 28 June 1895 | Benndorf | 24 October 1918 | near Bantheville (Argonne) | 7. Komp. Res.-Inf-Regt. 106 |
| reinforcement-soldier | Ernst Emil Leuschel | 46 | 01 February 1871 | Benndorf | 04 May 1917 | at the reserve-hospital II Leipzig | 4. Komp. Armierungs-Bataillon 191 |
| soldier | Ludwig Müller | 31 | 02 May 1895 | Bärnhöhe | 29 December 1916 | near Blanzée at Verdun (France) | 1. Komp. Ersatz-Inf.-Regt. 24 |
| soldier | Alfred Willy Richter | 19 | 27 December 1898 | Benndorf | 12 April 1918 | in le Papot, north-west of Nieppe, French Flanders | 11. Komp. Inf.Regt. 177 |
| soldier | Richard Paul Kröber | 23 | 28 October 1890 | Neukirchen | 20 August 1914 | near Walscheid (Lorraine) | |
| soldier of the reserve | Arno Alfred Thurm | 22 | 05 October 1891 | Benndorf | 27 September 1914 | near Saint-Souplet (France) | 1. Komp. Inf.-Regt. 107 |
| soldier | Julius Edwin Starke | 27 | 13 May 1887 | Klein-Eschefeld | 26 September 1914 | near Vaudesincourt (France) | 12. Komp. Res.-Inf-Regt. 106 |
| soldier | Arthur Alfred Schirmer | 22 | 23 February 1892 | Benndorf | 10 December 1914 | near La Bassé Ville (France) | 7. Komp. Inf.-Regt. 113 |
| sergeant | Albert Friedrich Kirsten | 25 | 09 April 1891 | Benndorf | 29 October 1916 | near Miraumont / Somme (France) | 11. Komp. Inf.-Regt. 106 |
| corporal | Emil Arthur Kurze | 30 | 18 October 1887 | Benndorf | 06 December 1917 | south-west of Anneux (France) | 1. Komp. Res.-Inf.-Regt. 107 |
| soldier | Walter Rudolf Uhlig | 19 | 25 November 1898 | Frohburg | 21 October 1918 | in the Woëvre west of the Moselle (France) | 2. Komp. Res.-Inf.-Regt. 106 |
| soldier | Martin Ettelt | 25 | 07 December 1891 | Benndorf | 08 December 1916 | 1915 wounded | |
| soldier | Otto Graichen | 20 | 26 April 1898 | Benndorf | 08 July 1919 | 1918 wounded | |

An electric threshing is taken in 1917 in operation. The large barn of the mill burned on September 30, 1921, down completely.
At the time of Kurt Heinrich Hildebrand Alexis von Einsiedel the manor came into receivership. Only in his last year, he could really call his property back his own. Colonel von Einsiedel was known and popular for its indestructible humor. He died on 19 November 1923 in a private hospital in Altenburg and was buried in Benndorf. Since the deceased has no children left, the manor Benndorf in 1923 came to his nephew, Royal Saxon Major A.D. Kurt von Einsiedel, which you have to say of serious concern, the structurally dilapidated manor are readmitted to its former glory as an ornament of the village.
1925 burned the mill building down to its foundations. In 1929 Benndorf has 517 inhabitants and the "Sachsen GmbH Brikettwerke Benndorf", a singing club and a cyclist club.
The late twenties of the 20th century the manor Benndorf comes into possession of the family Breitenbuch. This lease the property to the Richter family.
Arthur Hensel celebrated its 25th anniversary as mayor in Benndorf on 26 April 1931st A regulation of the Nazis from 5 March 1933 the local branch of the Workers' Benndorf cycling association was banned "solidarity". Housed in HJ-Heim library showed a positive development. Founded in October 1938 there was a year later 60 readers. On April 1, 1939, the establishment of the Nazi was attended by the Ortsgruppenleiter Pfefferkorn from Frohburg – Ortsgruppe Benndorf-Bubendorf instead
. 1944 busy with 2 kids on the manor Benndorf 33 deported Poles. In addition, were in Benndorf at farmers 13 prisoners of war, Poles, 17 deported from Poland, 5 Ukrainians with a child, 3 Russians, 2 Italians, 1 Romanian and 3 Yugoslavs. At the end of the second World War a POW camp for about 800 Allied prisoners military personnel was in the lock Benndorf since February 22, 1945 set up mainly for French officers from the POW camp Oflag IV D Elsterhorst came. On 13 April 1945 you experienced here with the entry of American troops to end the war. Richard Scheibe was used on 18 April by the Americans as mayor.
After the Second World War in July 1945 the manor was expropriated by the Soviet occupation and [# Land Reform in the Soviet Occupation Zone from 1945 land reform in the course of the split on 14 October 1945. Chairman of the Land Commission was Arno Raubold. The agricultural and forestry operation of the manor (306 hectares) was among accommodated in Benndorf refugees and displaced persons from the German eastern territories, many of them from the district Militsch in Lower Silesia, but also Prussia and of Galicia in today's Ukraine, divided.
On November 1, 1946, Comrade Richard Eidam was mayor of Benndorf. Since 1 January 1951 the inn is in the city owned and in 1956 by the Konsum Frohburg taken. 1955 settled kindergarten is established from the harvest kindergarten. With the establishment of LPG "free farmers" (type III) on 11/02/1956 in Benndorf the manor building has been cultivated by the end of the GDR by this.
In the 1950s, the three-winged castle was demolished piecemeal, although the abort command of land commission had long been barred. The manor buildings and the park were not maintained and fell rapidly.

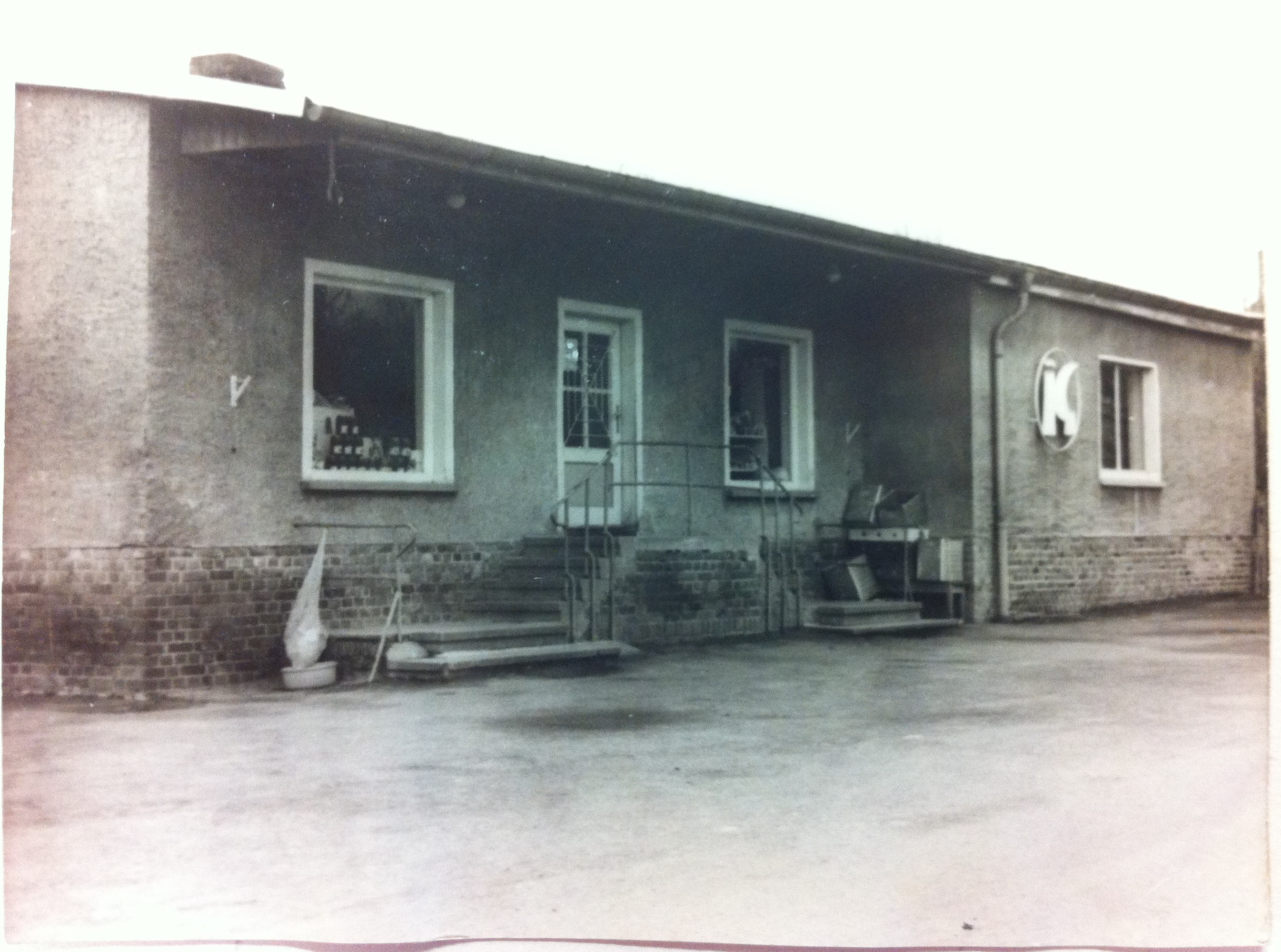
Konsum Benndorf

In 1957 was a transformer building built. In July Opened in 1959, the new consumer outlet. Also, the bridge over the Wyhra and a mill race was built in 1959. A new weighbridge and a weighing house built in the same year. On the occasion of the 10th anniversary of the GDR the newly established village nursery opened.

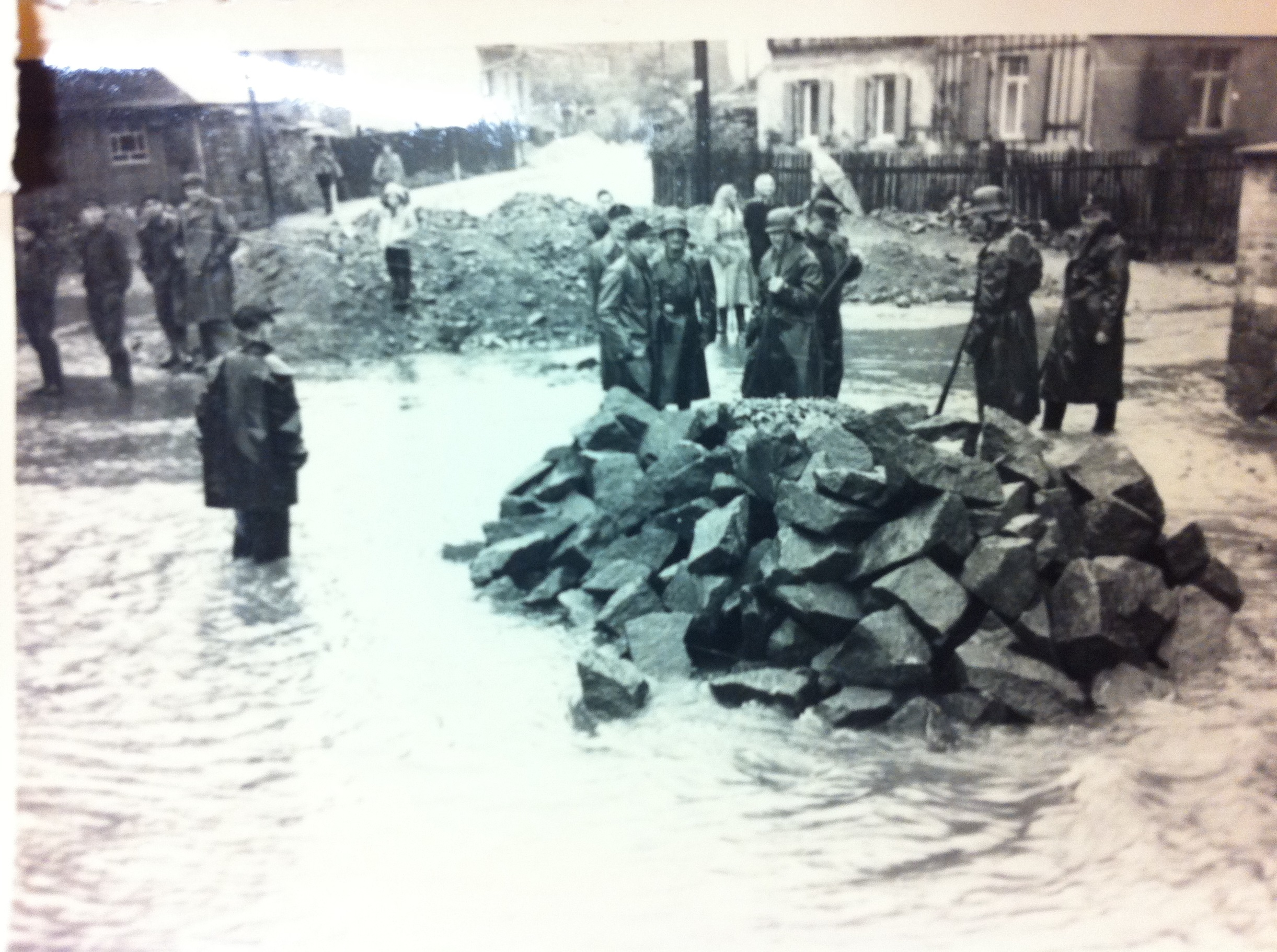
Construction of the bridge over the river Wyhra

The men's choir, which already existed until 1942, was founded in 1961 new. 1963 fire extinguishing pond has been created to improve the fire fighting water supply. On June 25, a BSG was established with the departments Youth football and women's handball. To eliminate the cause of the frequent floods the Wyhra 1964 was straightened below the village on a length of 850 meters and built a new bridge. The local washing base was closed 1967. On March 16, 1967, final acceptance of the new pig sty of LPG at the sheepfold.
In 1968 the road of Benndorf received a mixed chippings covering according Bubendorf. The village road in the village location Benndorf got restarted a bitumen ceiling. Before, it was a right mud road. South of the village a 220 kV high voltage line was built. On 9 July 1968, the merger of the LPG type I Benndorf "Wyhratal" with the LPG type III Frohburg "Florian Geyer". 1969 lay members of VKSK Benndorf to a self-contained garden. The following year, the transfer of the youth and athletes home by the Council of the community to the youth took place.
On June 30, the teaching profession in primary schools Benndorf was adjusted. The children of the 1st to 3rd class go Nenkersdorf to school. From the 4th year they go to Frohburg. The Benndorf school building is only used as a school club. On May 29, 1972, at 6:23 PM, the first line bus carried by Benndorf. On 31 December 1973 Ernst Wolf resigned the office of mayor for health reasons. He worked for 20 years in office and has done through personal dedication much for the community Benndorf. Successor is on 1 January 1974 Christine Otto. It is again removed from office in July 1975, Ms. Arnold is employed as mayor. She was only a short time in office. From 1976 to 1978 takes the Deputy Mayor Kurt Feist. From 1978 Rudolph Niegel mayor in Benndorf.
1983 orchard being cut down in addition to the dairy plant. About 130 trees aged 15–20 years were cleared because no caregiver was there for this plant. In the same year carried out extensions to the kindergarten and installation of a playground in the former school garden. From 1 January 1986 is Birgit Winkler Mayor of Benndorf. It carried out large-scale meliorative in the Benndorfer corridor. Benndorf is connected to the garbage disposal of the VEB services combine Borna.
Manfred Becker are after 11 years from the management of the consumption restaurant. From 28 May 1987 to 14 January 1968 Matthias Koch leads the restaurant. Since that day, the restaurant is closed. On May 9, the bull stable next to the kindergarten of LPG was demolished.
From 7 to 9 June 1991, the 750th anniversary celebration took place.

Benndorf was until 1856 in Saxon or Royal Saxon Official Borna. From 1856 to place court official Frohburg and from 1875 to Amtshauptmannschaft Borna was. The neighboring Bubendorf was on October 1, 1948, incorporated by Benndorf. In 1952 the annexation to the district Geithain in district Leipzig, which opened in 1994 in Leipzig county land. On 1 January 1997 Benndorf was incorporated into the city Frohburg whereby Benndorf and Bubendorf districts of Frohburg were. Both places did not use of the possibility to form local councils for their district.

== 21st century ==
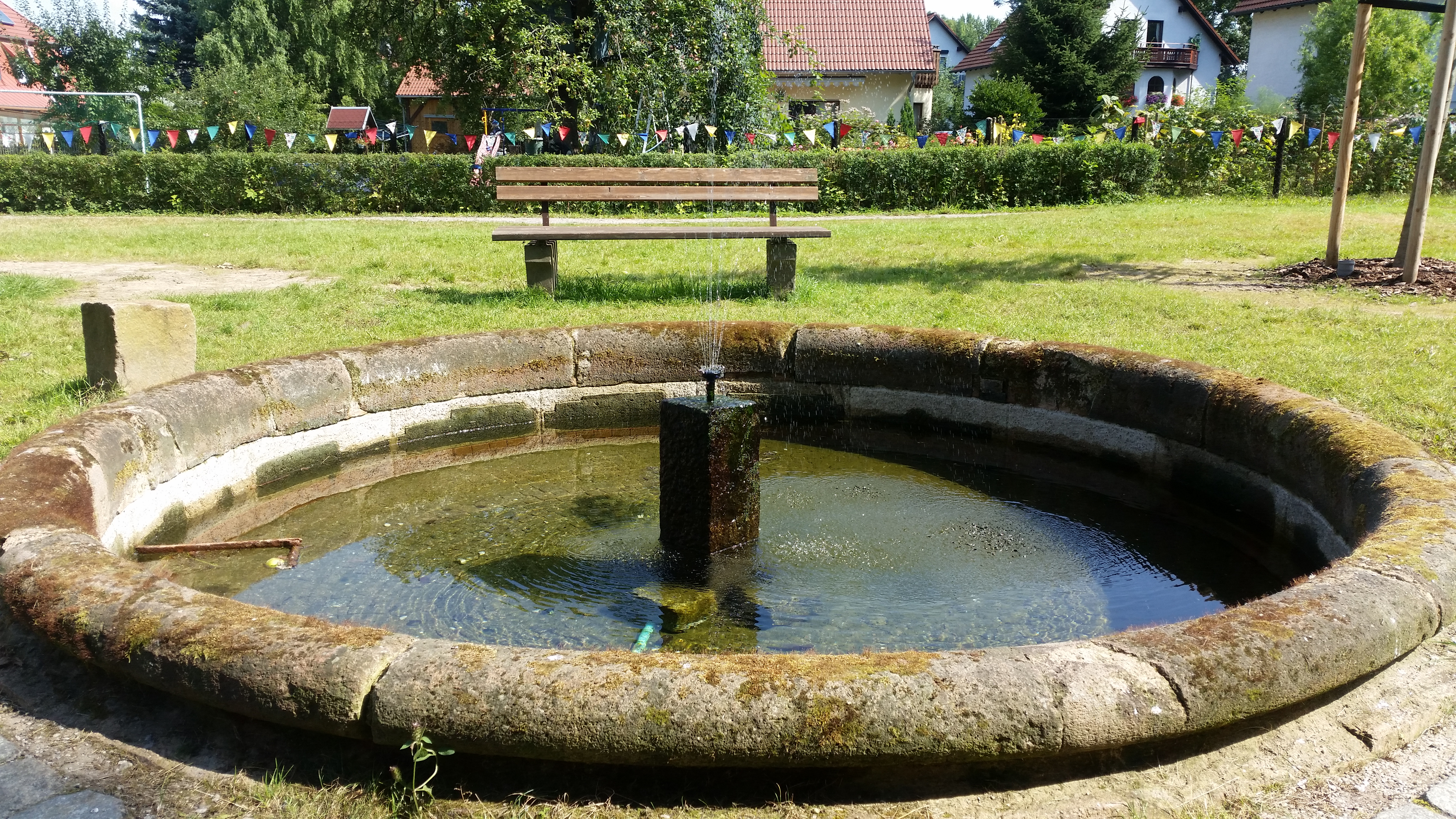
The fountain in the park

Since the district reform in Saxony Benndorf now part of the newly founded on 01/08/2008 district Landkreis Leipzig. With the help of the Association Rittergut Benndorf and the Cultural and Environmental Foundation of Sparkasse Leipzig have been carried out in recent years some embellishment and maintenance services in the park. Among other things, the fountain was renovated, repaired and provided with an inlet and outlet. Furthermore, ten banks were established, several beech trees planted, repaired the bridge, marked the ground plan of the castle and erected a poster.
In 2016 the 800-year celebration was held ftpm 11th to 14 August. For four-day program included a prayer in the church, a lecture on the history, guided local tours, the special opening of the Village Museum and an exhibition of local artists. In the castle park area there was in the marquee entertainment with local DJs, live bands Leiseschrei, Fonatics and Kurzschluss as well as performances of ventriloquist Roy Reinker and Limbacher Variety. In addition, the school club Einsteins, the music school Fröhlich, the dance group from Kitzscher, cheerleaders from Meuselwitz, Guggenmusik from Borna and an amateur theater from Benndorf with a historical drama occurred. There was also music by the campfire, fireworks, historical children's games and a bouncy castle, a forest and meadow volleyball tournament and a meeting of tractor fans from Frohburg. There were tours with tractors and donkey carts as well as the "driving without a license" and the goal-spraying with the Frohburg firefighters. In manor grounds a farmer's market and historic craft was to marvel at – just like the old farm equipment and the flea market in the village square and on the island. A choir singing with guests from Kitzscher and Mölbis in the church and a church service in the tent were also part of the program. For the children there was a lantern procession and the now third Benndorf duck race on the Wyhra. Prior to the festival, the whole village was decorated with bunting, straw dolls and all kinds of creative ideas. The best of them were awarded at the festival.

== Literature ==
Richard Steche: Benndorf. In: Beschreibende Darstellung der älteren Bau- und Kunstdenkmäler des Königreichs Sachsen, 15. Volume: Amtshauptmannschaft Borna. C. C. Meinhold, Dresden, 1891, p. 5.
