= Remse =

- Municipality
- Location of Remse within Zwickau district
- Interactive map of Remse
- Location within Germany Location within Saxony
- Coordinates: 50°51′14″N 12°34′32″E
- Country: Germany
- State: Saxony
- District: Zwickau
- Subdivisions: 5

Government
  - Mayor (2022–29): Karsten Schultz (CDU)

Area
  - Total: 14.79 km^{2} (5.71 sq mi)
- Elevation: 225 m (738 ft)

Population (2025-12-31)
  - Total: 1,590
  - Density: 108/km^{2} (278/sq mi)
- Time zone: UTC+01:00 (CET)
  - Summer (DST): UTC+02:00 (CEST)
- Postal codes: 08373
- Dialling codes: 03763
- Vehicle registration: Z
- Website: www.remse-mulde.de

Remse is a municipality in the district of Zwickau in Saxony in Germany. Remse is located 2 miles north of Glauchau. Two federal highway cross the municipality. Besides that the federal Autobahn A4 is accessible from south of town.

== Neighborhood Communities ==
Neighborhood municipalities are Oberwiera and Schönberg as well as Meerane, Glauchau and Waldenburg.

They municipality constists of five villages, the eponymous Remse and Weidensdorf, Kleinchursdorf, Kertzsch und Oertelshain.

The potato processing plant near Weidensdorf is the largest company in Remsa.
