= Waldenburg, Saxony =

Waldenburg
- Town
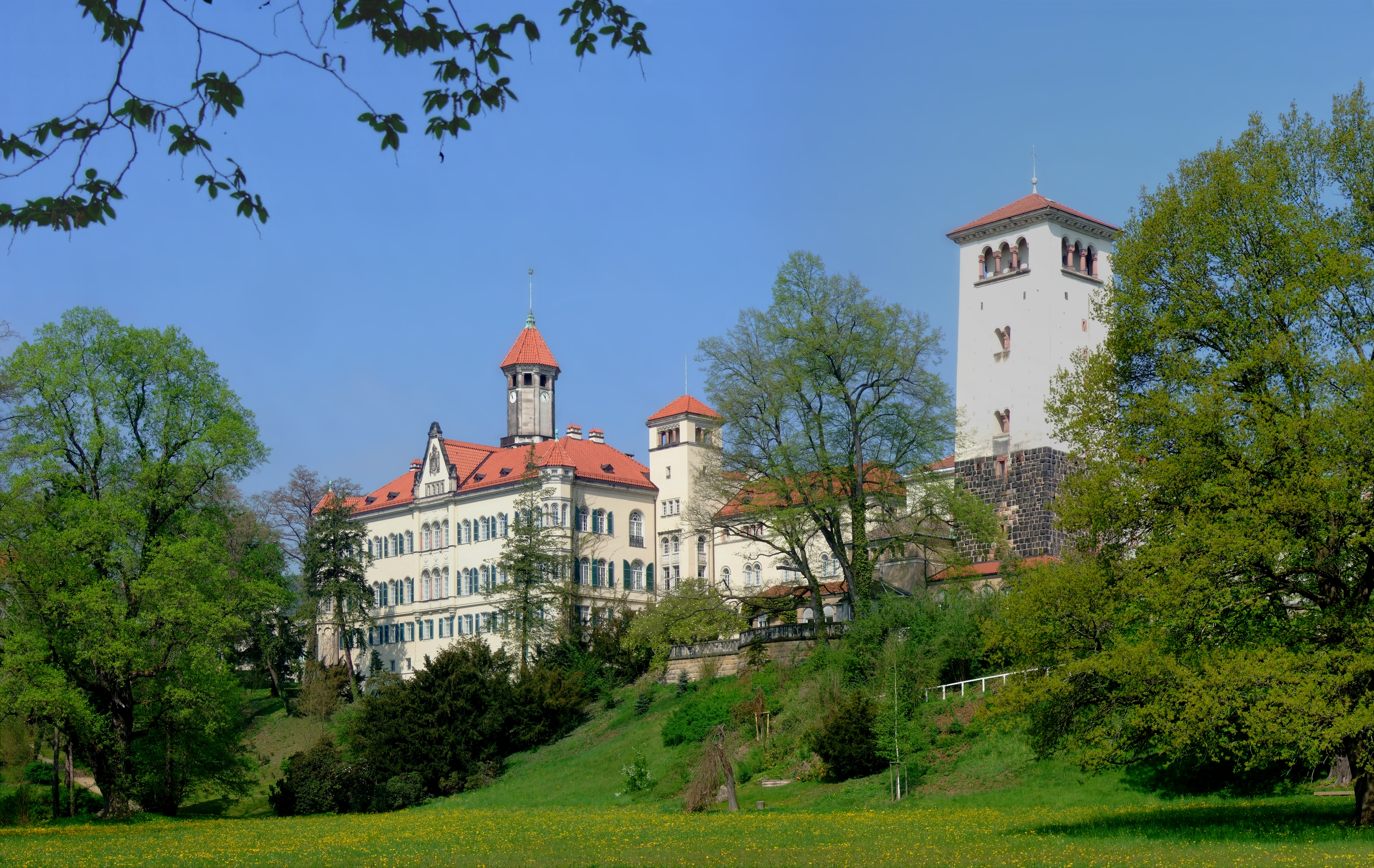
- Waldenburg Castle

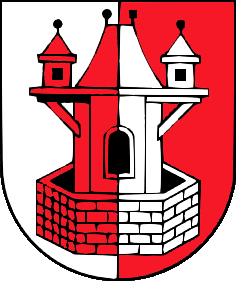
- Coat of arms

- Location of Waldenburg within Zwickau district
- Interactive map of Waldenburg
- Location within Germany Location within Saxony
- Coordinates: 50°52′33″N 12°35′59″E
- Country: Germany
- State: Saxony
- District: Zwickau
- Subdivisions: 7

Government
  - Mayor (2022–29): Jörg Götze

Area
  - Total: 25.06 km^{2} (9.68 sq mi)
- Elevation: 254 m (833 ft)

Population (2025-12-31)
  - Total: 3,903
  - Density: 155.7/km^{2} (403.4/sq mi)
- Time zone: UTC+01:00 (CET)
  - Summer (DST): UTC+02:00 (CEST)
- Postal codes: 08396
- Dialling codes: 037608
- Vehicle registration: Z, GC, HOT, WDA
- Website: www.waldenburg.de

Waldenburg (German pronunciation: [ˈvaldn̩bʊʁk]) is a town in the district Zwickau in Saxony, Germany. The castle was owned by the House of Schönburg from 1378 until 1945. The pottery town of Waldenburg lies in the valley of the Zwickauer Mulde. The environment is characterized by forest areas, river meadows and the hilly landscape of the Erzgebirge foothills.

Waldenburg was founded around 1254 and first documented in 1336 as the town of "Waldinberg". The German settlement of the area that later became Waldenburg began with the founding of the monastery in Remse in 1143. The construction of Waldenburg Castle took place between 1165 and 1172. It was built as a security post on the salt trade route at the Mulden crossing.

The streets, buildings and remains of the town wall in the upper town still show Waldenburg's roots in the Middle Ages. A look into the multi-story cellar systems of the upper town reveal even more evidence of this.

Waldenburg's pottery tradition has been strong for 700 years. Friedrich XI of Schönburg-Waldenburg awarded the Waldenburg potters their first letter of guild in 1388. Salt-glazed Waldenburg stoneware became very famous throughout Europe in the late Middle Ages.

Neighborhood municipalities are Callenberg, the city of Glauchau and Limbach-Oberfrohna, Oberwiera and Remse as well as Göpfersdorf, Jückelberg and Ziegelheim.

== Subdivisions ==
The town of Waldenburg consists of the following subdivisions:

- Waldenburg
- Dürrenuhlsdorf
- Franken
- Niederwinkel
- Oberwinkel
- Schlagwitz
- Schwaben

== Attractions ==
The town is famous for pottery and for the Grünfelder Park, an English-style park.

Other famous attraction are:

- Naturalienkabinett (museum of natural produce)
- Heimatmuseum (museum of local history)
- The castle of Schönburg-Waldenburg

== European Grammar School ==
The European Grammar School (German: Europäisches Gymnasium Waldenburg) is a private language school, established in 1994. The building was built in 1844 as a "Lehrerseminar" (School for teachers). Karl May was one of the famous students.
