= Frohnsdorf =

- Ortsteil of Nobitz
- Interactive map of Frohnsdorf
- Location within Germany Location within Thuringia
- Coordinates: 50°56′9″N 12°35′9″E
- Country: Germany
- State: Thuringia
- District: Altenburger Land
- Municipality: Nobitz

Area
  - Total: 4.37 km^{2} (1.69 sq mi)
- Elevation: 220 m (720 ft)

Population (2016-12-31)
  - Total: 246
  - Density: 56.3/km^{2} (146/sq mi)
- Time zone: UTC+01:00 (CET)
  - Summer (DST): UTC+02:00 (CEST)
- Postal codes: 04618
- Dialling codes: 034497
- Vehicle registration: ABG

Frohnsdorf is a village and a former municipality in the district Altenburger Land, in Thuringia, Germany. Since July 2018, it is part of the municipality Nobitz.
