= Jückelberg =

- Ortsteil of Nobitz
- Interactive map of Jückelberg
- Location within Germany Location within Thuringia
- Coordinates: 50°56′N 12°38′E
- Country: Germany
- State: Thuringia
- District: Altenburger Land
- Municipality: Nobitz

Area
  - Total: 7.96 km^{2} (3.07 sq mi)
- Elevation: 255 m (837 ft)

Population (2016-12-31)
  - Total: 289
  - Density: 36.3/km^{2} (94.0/sq mi)
- Time zone: UTC+01:00 (CET)
  - Summer (DST): UTC+02:00 (CEST)
- Postal codes: 04618
- Dialling codes: 034497

Jückelberg is a village and a former municipality in the district Altenburger Land, in Thuringia, Germany. Since July 2018, it is part of the municipality Nobitz. It is the easternmost settlement in Thuringia.
