= Leipzig–Altenburg Airport =

Leipzig–Altenburg Airport Flughafen Altenburg–Nobitz

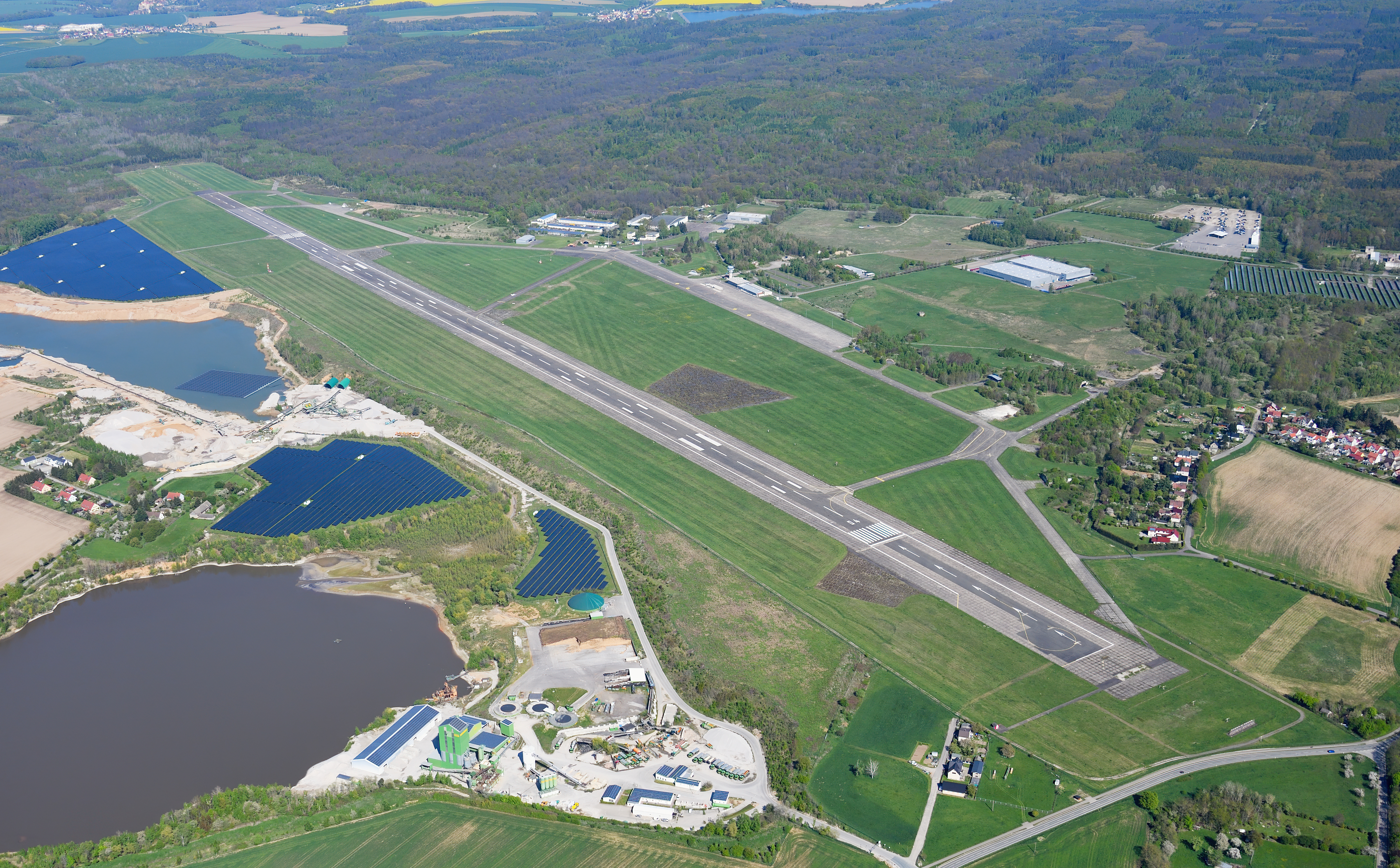
- IATA: AOC; ICAO: EDAC

Summary
- Airport type: Public
- Operator: Flugplatz Altenburg-Nobitz GmbH
- Serves: Altenburg and Leipzig, Germany
- Location: Nobitz
- Elevation AMSL: 639.7 ft / 195 m
- Coordinates: 50°58′50″N 12°30′36″E
- Website: leipzig-altenburg-airport.de

Map
- Location of airport in Thuringia CSO (Germany) CSO (Europe)

Runways
Direction	Length		Surface
Direction	ft	m	Surface
04/22	7,989	2,435	Paved
- AIP at German air traffic control.

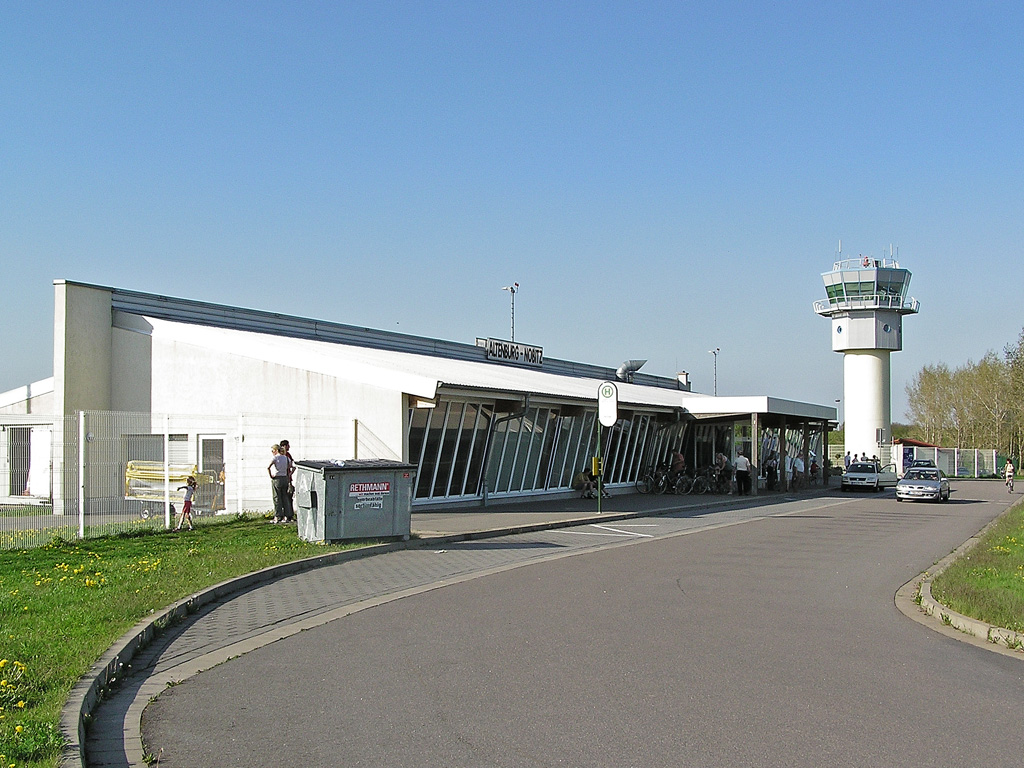
Terminal and tower

Leipzig–Altenburg Airport (IATA: AOC, ICAO: EDAC) (known as Altenburg–Nobitz Airport until February 2008) is a German regional airport in Nobitz, six kilometres (3 1/2 miles) southeast of Altenburg and 42 km (26 mi) south of Leipzig, in the state of Thuringia. It was the second largest airport in Thuringia after Erfurt-Weimar Airport when it had scheduled traffic. In 2007, it served almost 140,000 passengers. All scheduled services ceased in 2011.

== History ==
=== Early years ===
The airfield at Altenburg–Nobitz is one of the oldest in Germany. Its origins can be traced back as far as 1868, when the area the airfield now occupies was first used as an infantry drill ground. In 1881, Duke Ernst II of Sachsen-Altenburg agreed to further expansion of the site for military purposes, and in 1909 a visit was made by an early airship; the Duke was given a flight in it, and immediately became an enthusiastic convert to aviation. Two years later, in 1911, an airship display was held at the site, which also included flights by early heavier-than-air biplanes, and in June 1913 the airfield was officially established.

During World War I, Altenburg–Nobitz was mainly used as a production centre for German military aircraft, with Albatros, DFW, Rumpler and Fokker types all being assembled there. A military flying school was also located on the airfield.

Following the defeat of Germany, the airfield infrastructure was dismantled in accordance with the provisions of the Treaty of Versailles. The site lay derelict until the 1930s, but after the Nazi Party came to power a decision was made to reactivate Altenburg–Nobitz as part of German rearmament plans. Work on this began in 1936; new hangars, workshops and barracks were built, and a concrete runway laid.

During World War II, the relative remoteness of Altenburg–Nobitz from the main theatres of war made the airfield an obvious location for Luftwaffe flying training in various forms. Basic flying training was carried out, as was more advanced blind-flying and instrument training. Several types of aircraft were employed for the latter, among them the Junkers Ju 87, Junkers Ju 88, Heinkel He 111, Dornier Do 17, and Messerschmitt Bf 110. The airfield was also the base for a conversion unit for the Focke-Wulf Fw 190, using a special two-seat variant of this successful fighter.

=== Development after World War II ===
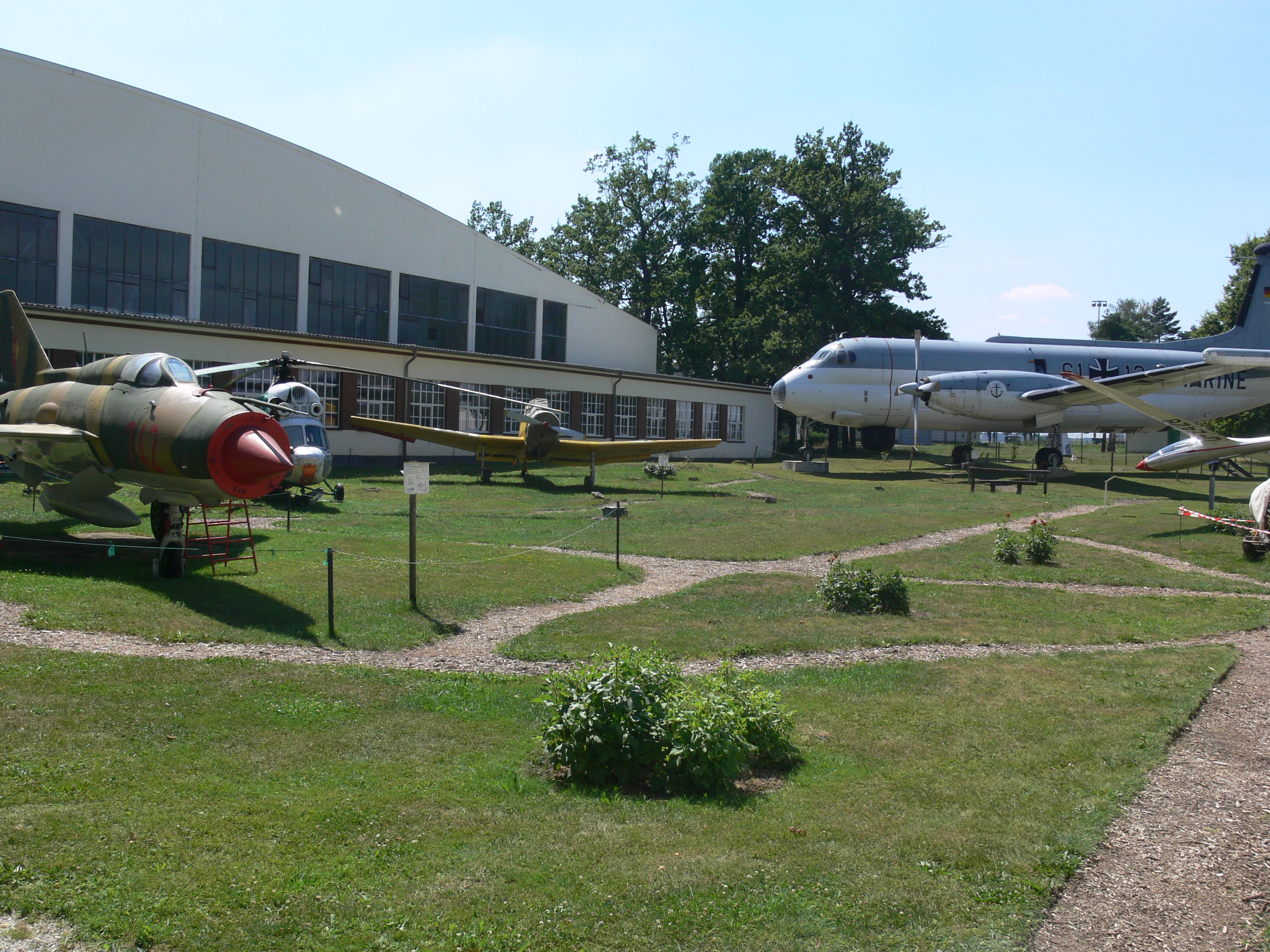
Museum at the airport

With the collapse of the Reich, the airfield was captured by the US Army in April 1945, being subsequently handed over to the Soviets in July, when the area came under Soviet control, following the post-war territorial settlement between the Allies. From then until 1992 Altenburg–Nobitz was used as a fighter base by the Soviet Air Force. Successive types of MiG fighters were based there, principally the MiG-21 and later the MiG-29. The camouflaged individual blister hangars that were built for these fighters can still be seen dotted around the airfield perimeter. An anti-aircraft missile system was also installed there in 1986.

The Soviet presence on the airfield ended in 1992 with the collapse of communism and the radical redrawing of the political landscape which ensued. Following German Reunification, the airfield was converted to civilian use as a regional airport. For some years, Ryanair operated services to and from the UK and Spain, but these were discontinued in April 2011. Leipzig–Altenburg (as the airfield is now known) is today mainly used by general aviation and corporate aircraft. There is also a small aviation museum which chronicles the history of the airfield. Two aircraft are currently on display there: an ex-Soviet Air Force MiG-21, and an ex-Luftwaffe Breguet 'Atlantique' maritime patrol aircraft.

== Airlines and destinations ==
There have been no scheduled services to and from Leipzig–Altenburg since Ryanair ended flights in 2011. The nearest international airports are Erfurt–Weimar Airport and Leipzig/Halle Airport.

== Statistics ==
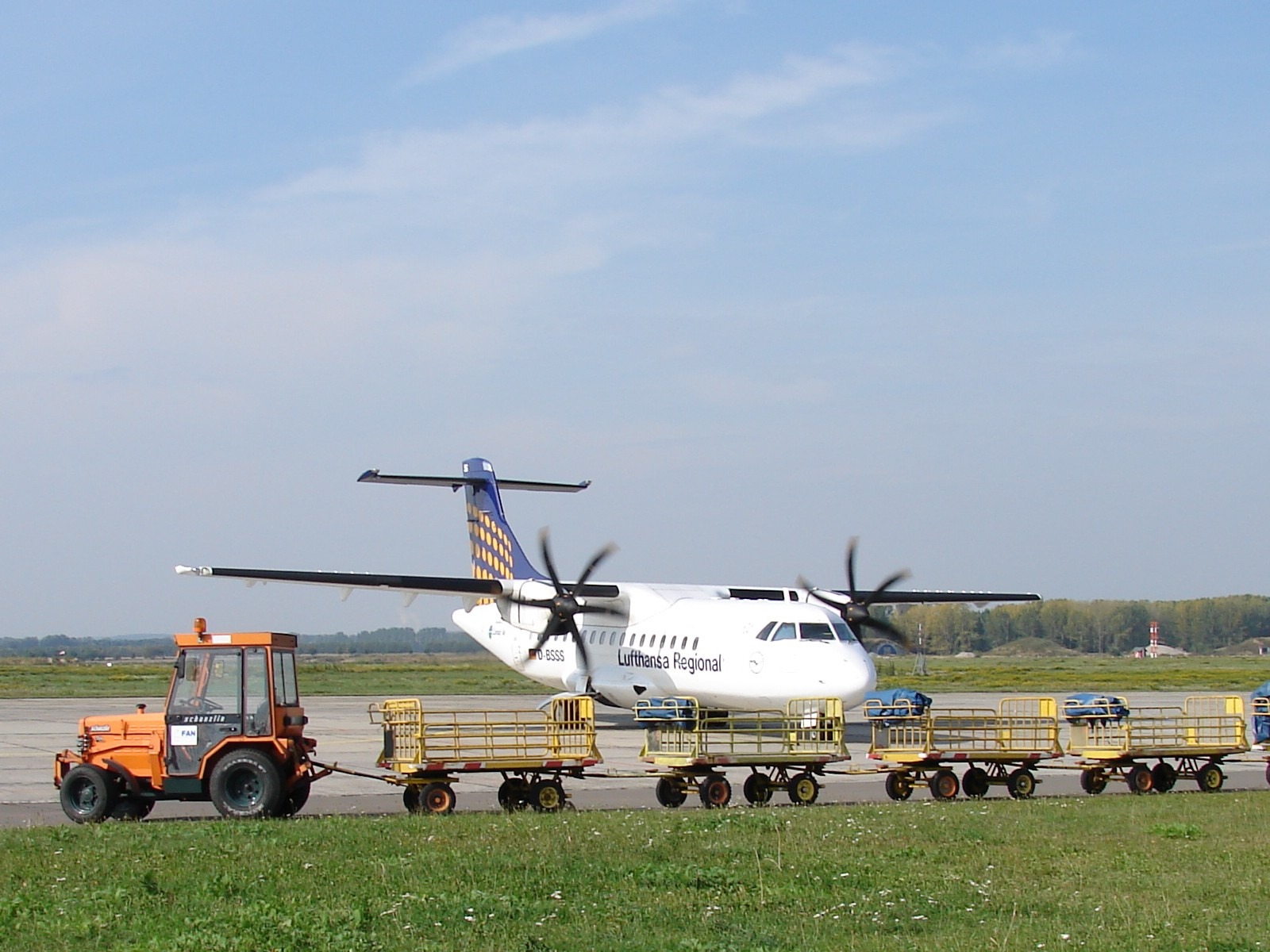
A Contact Air ATR42-500 at Leipzig–Altenburg Airport

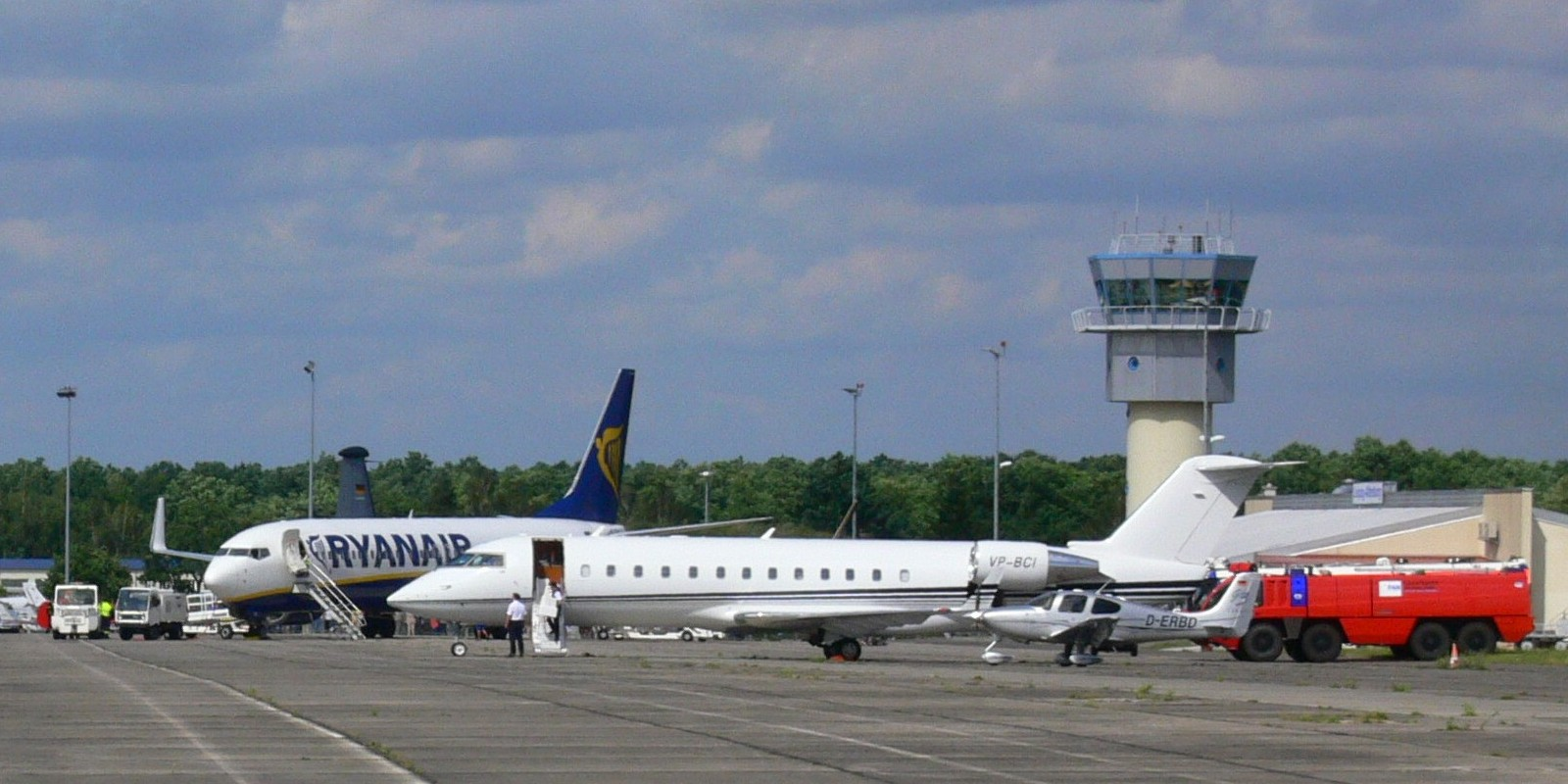
Ramp at Leipzig–Altenburg Airport

Year	Aircraft movements	Passengers (scheduled flights)	Passengers (total)	Cargo (t)
1992	920	0	1,983	0
1995	18,462	0	19,788	0
1998	17,720	0	27,016	180.2
1999	17,693	0	30,044	66.2
2000	17,997	0	27,764	131.9
2001	16,127	0	26,868	27.9
2002	19,543	0	26,811	32.1
2003	16,116	51,419	71,124	20.7
2004	13,978	76,606	93,870	12.4
2005	12,601	100,956	118,252	102.7
2006	12,934	90,551	105,213	10.4
2007	14,232	124,411	139,593	20.3

== Accidents and incidents ==
- On March 10, 2010, a Ryanair Boeing 737-800, originating from London–Stansted, on approach to Altenburg could not establish radio contact with the tower and had to divert to Schönefeld Airport in Berlin. It was later discovered that, due to a scheduling misunderstanding, the air traffic controller scheduled had not shown up to work.

== See also ==
- Transport in Germany
- List of airports in Germany
