= Nobitz =

- Municipality
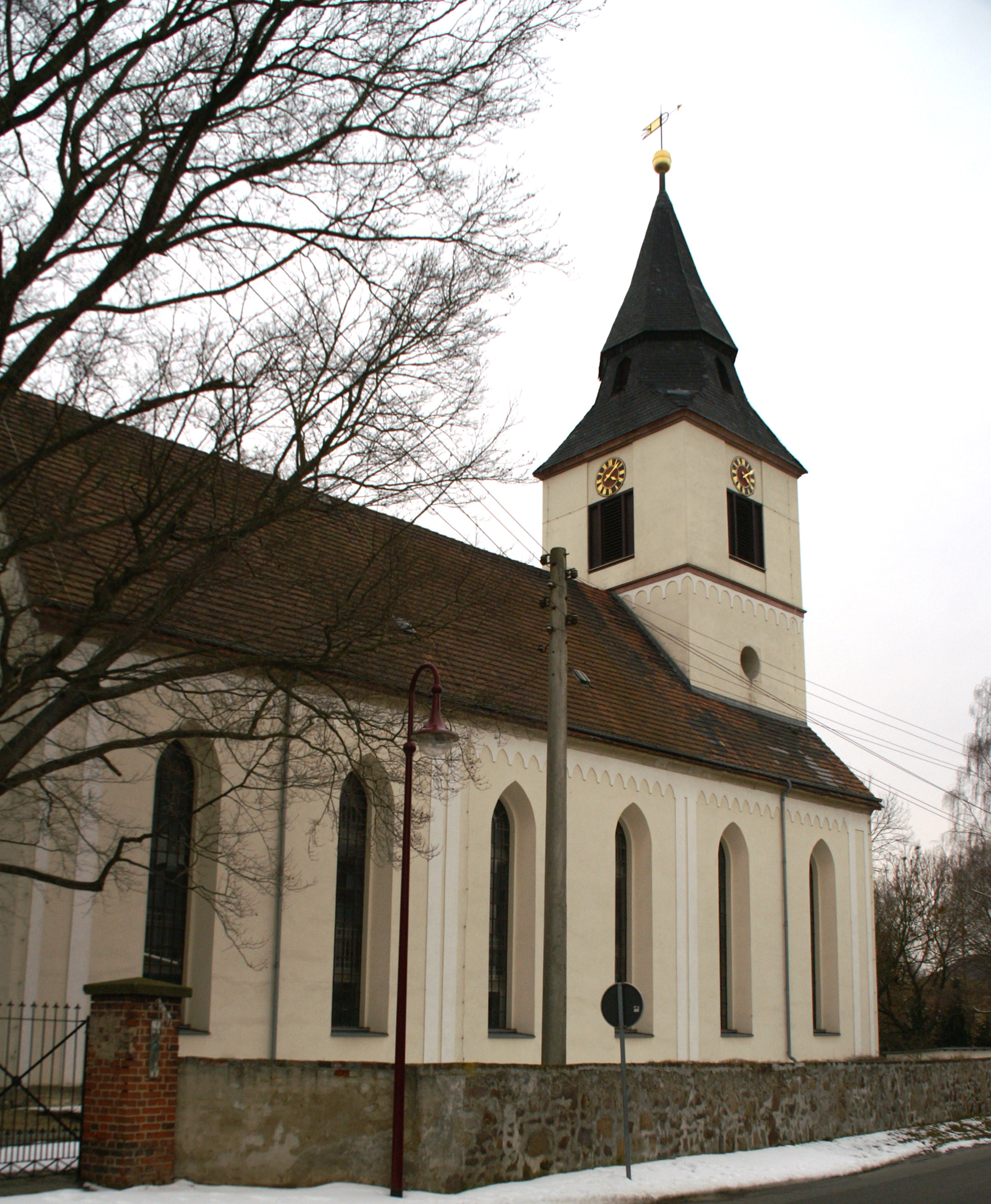
- Lutheran church in Nobitz

- Coat of arms

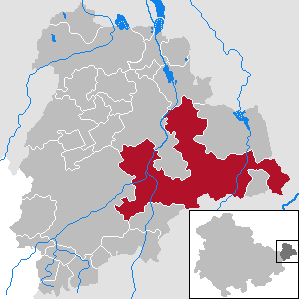
- Location of Nobitz within Altenburger Land district
- Interactive map of Nobitz
- Location within Germany Location within Thuringia
- Coordinates: 50°58′N 12°29′E
- Country: Germany
- State: Thuringia
- District: Altenburger Land

Government
  - Mayor (2021–27): Hendrik Läbe (SPD)

Area
  - Total: 100.37 km^{2} (38.75 sq mi)
- Elevation: 179 m (587 ft)

Population (2025-12-31)
  - Total: 6,962
  - Density: 69.36/km^{2} (179.7/sq mi)
- Time zone: UTC+01:00 (CET)
  - Summer (DST): UTC+02:00 (CEST)
- Postal codes: 04603
- Dialling codes: 03447, 034493, 034494
- Vehicle registration: ABG
- Website: www.nobitz.de

Nobitz (German pronunciation: [ˈnoːbɪts]) is a municipality in the district Altenburger Land, in Thuringia, Germany. The nearby Nobitz airfield was used by Ryanair for flights to and from London Stansted between 2003 and 2011.

== History ==
Within the German Empire (1871–1918), Nobitz was part of the Duchy of Saxe-Altenburg. In East Germany, it was part of Bezirk Leipzig. In July 2018 the former municipalities of Frohnsdorf, Jückelberg and Ziegelheim were merged into Nobitz.
