= Ziegelheim =

- Ortsteil of Nobitz
- Interactive map of Ziegelheim
- Location within Germany Location within Thuringia
- Coordinates: 50°55′33″N 12°33′12″E
- Country: Germany
- State: Thuringia
- District: Altenburger Land
- Municipality: Nobitz

Area
  - Total: 17.32 km^{2} (6.69 sq mi)
- Elevation: 220 m (720 ft)

Population (2016-12-31)
  - Total: 826
  - Density: 47.7/km^{2} (124/sq mi)
- Time zone: UTC+01:00 (CET)
  - Summer (DST): UTC+02:00 (CEST)
- Postal codes: 04618
- Dialling codes: 034494
- Vehicle registration: ABG

Ziegelheim is a village and a former municipality in the district Altenburger Land, in Thuringia, Germany. Since July 2018, it is part of the municipality Nobitz.

== History ==
Within the German Empire (1871–1918), Ziegelheim was part of the Kingdom of Saxony.
