= Pleiße =

River in Germany

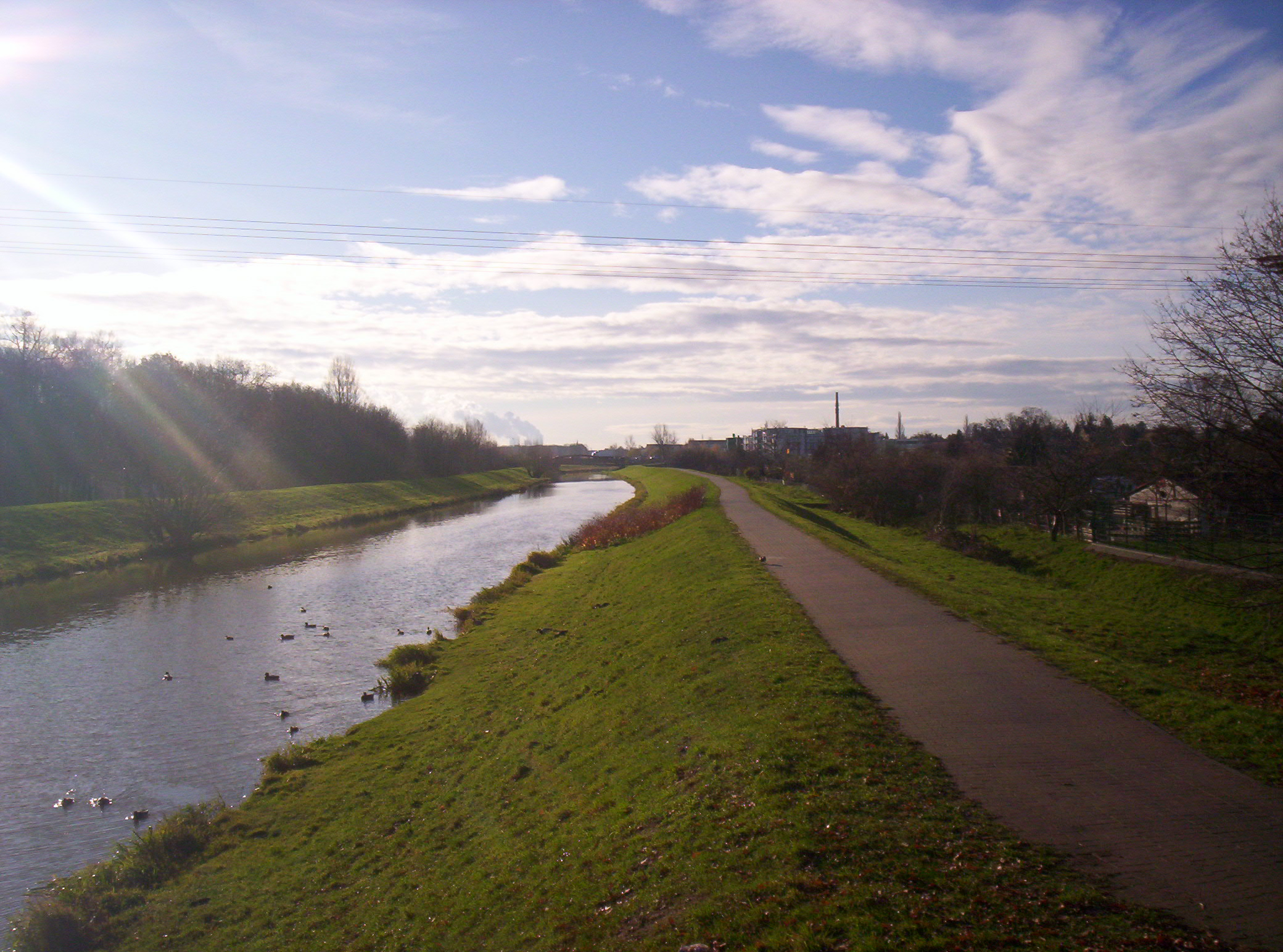
- The Pleiße in Markkleeberg, near Leipzig

Location
- Country: Germany
- States: Saxony and Thuringia

Physical characteristics
- Source
  - location: Drei-Linden-Brunnen (formerly Alboldsbrunnen) in Ebersbrunn near Zwickau
  - coordinates: 50°38′51″N 12°25′31″E
  - elevation: 443 m
- Mouth
  - location: White Elster (Elster flood plain) in Leipzig
  - coordinates: 51°19′21″N 12°21′27″E
  - elevation: 103 m
- Length: 90 km (56 mi)
- Basin size: 1,876 km^{2} (724 sq mi)

Basin features
- Progression: White Elster→ Saale→ Elbe→ North Sea
- Landmarks: Cities: Leipzig; Large towns: Werdau, Crimmitschau, Altenburg, Markkleeberg; Small towns: Gößnitz, Regis-Breitingen, Rötha, Böhlen
- Tributaries
  - left: Koberbach, Sprotte
  - right: Paradiesbach, Wyhra, Gösel
- Inland ports: none
- Navigable: no

The Pleiße (German pronunciation: [ˈplaɪsə]) is a river of Saxony and Thuringia, Germany. It flows from south to north into the White Elster in Leipzig. Originally, its natural length was 115 km (71 mi); however, south of Leipzig, it has been straightened, which shortened it to around 90 km (56 mi).

The river is well accessible via the Pleiße cycle path.

The name Pleiße is of old Sorbian origin and means: "the swamp-forming water". It gave its name to the Pleissnerland (Plisni) on its lower reaches, which was important in the Middle Ages.

== Course ==
The Pleiße has its source southwest of Zwickau in Lichtentanne, locality Ebersbrunn. The Saxon towns of Werdau and Crimmitschau are followed by the Thuringian communities of Ponitz, Gößnitz, Nobitz and Altenburg. Behind Windischleuba, the Windischleuba dam regulates the flow to Fockendorf and Treben. After Haselbach, which is still part of the municipial association (Verwaltungsgemeinschaft) Pleißenaue in Thuringia, follow the Saxon communities of Regis-Breitingen, Neukieritzsch, Rötha, Böhlen, Markkleeberg, before the Pleiße arrives at Leipzig. It flows into the White Elster via the Pleiße flood channel and the Elster flood channel.

== Water quality ==
In the 20th century, the discharge of waste products from the carbochemical industry in the south of Leipzig led to discoloration, stench, heavy foaming and the death of all life in the lower reaches of the river. This made the Pleiße a synonym for a polluted river during the time of East Germany and earned it the names "Communists' Puddle" and "Rio Phenole". On 5 June 1988, a "Pleiße Memorial March" (Pleiße-Gedenkmarsch) of oppositional environmental groups with 120 to 140 people took place in Leipzig, which the Stasi tried in vain to prevent.

However, after the industry that caused it was shut down in the 1990s, the water quality improved significantly, so that numerous species of fish can now be found again. In 2016, there is still a slight (non-toxic) brown discoloration due to iron compounds, especially pyrite, from the water regime of the mostly closed lignite mining.

== Music and poetry ==
Johann Sebastian Bach paid tribute to the river in two works. One, the cantata Schleicht, spielende Wellen, BWV 206 he composed based on the poem by an unknown poet on the occasion of the birthday of August III who was Saxon Elector and also King of Poland. In a typically baroque panegyric, a speech of praise and celebration, the rivers Vistula, Elbe, Pleiße and Danube pay homage to the prince and king. The Danube and Elbe quarrel over who may claim the "most august" ruler, the "double ruling sun" (his wife was the Austrian princess Maria Josepha). The little nymph Pleiße, however, triumphs in the war of words over the "mossy heads of strong streams", and the four rivers join in a harmonious song of praise.

In the second Auf, schmetternde Töne der muntern Trompeten, BWV 207a, presumably performed in 1735 on the prince's name day, the second movement is dedicated to her, playing recitative Die stille Pleiße.

Die stille Pleiße spielt
Mit ihren kleinen Wellen ...

The quiet Pleiße plays
With her little waves ...

— Anonymous, before 1735

In 1736 a collection of songs entitled Singende Muse an der Pleiße was published in Leipzig. Its author, Sperontes, had compiled simple melodies and underscored them with his own texts. The collection was very popular and went through several editions.

== The course in pictures ==
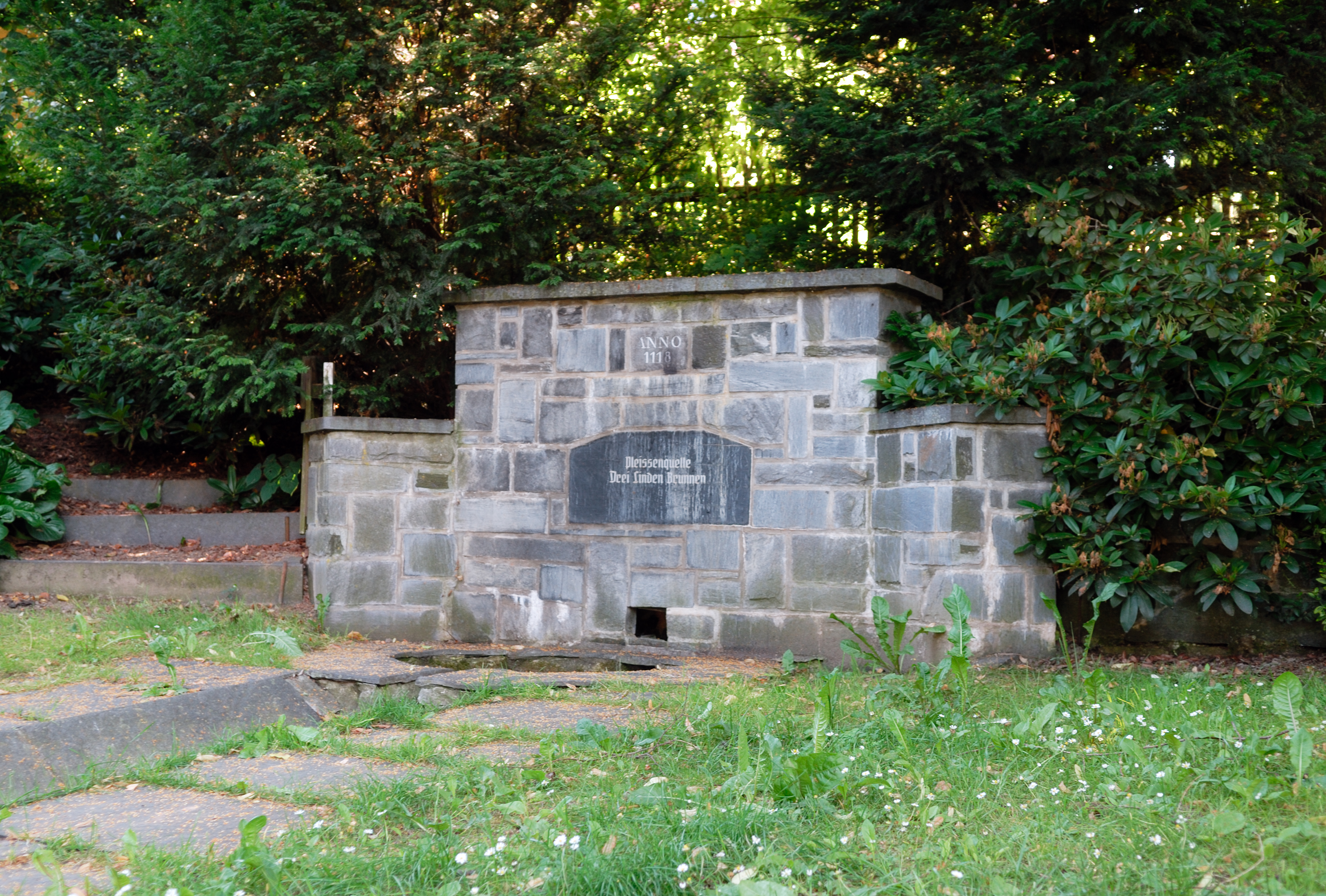
Pleiße source

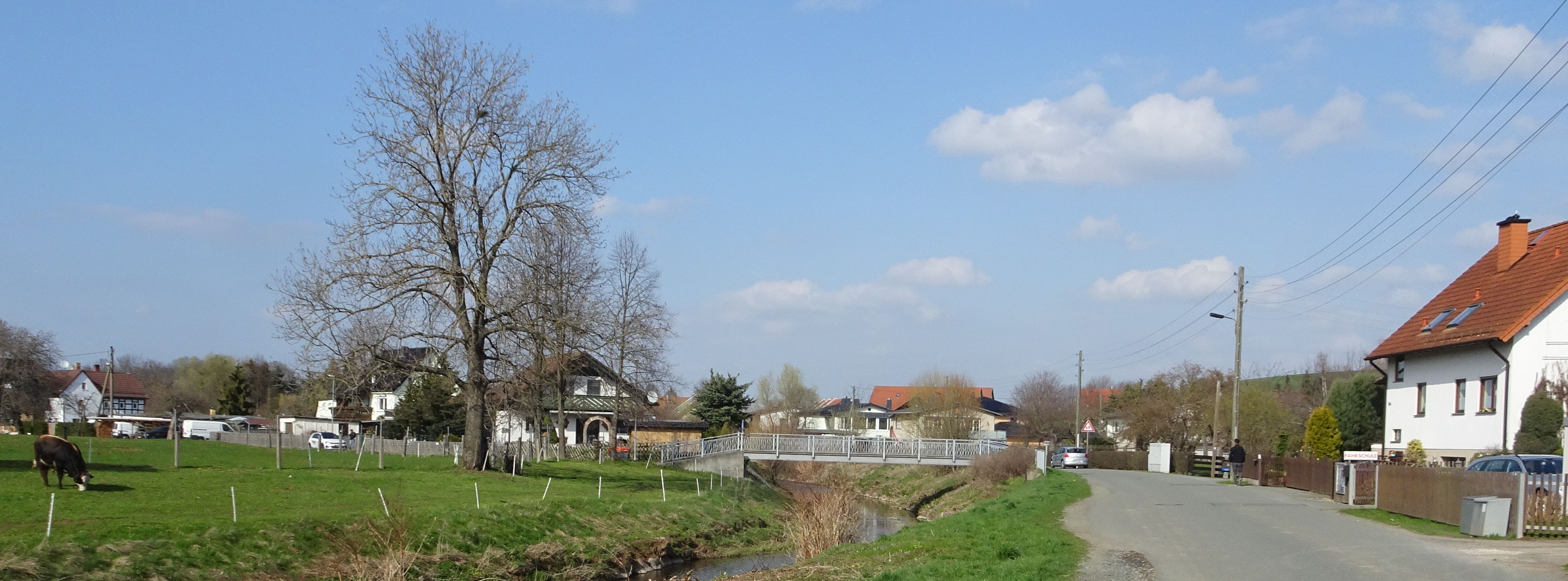
Pedestrian bridge in Langenhessen / Werdau

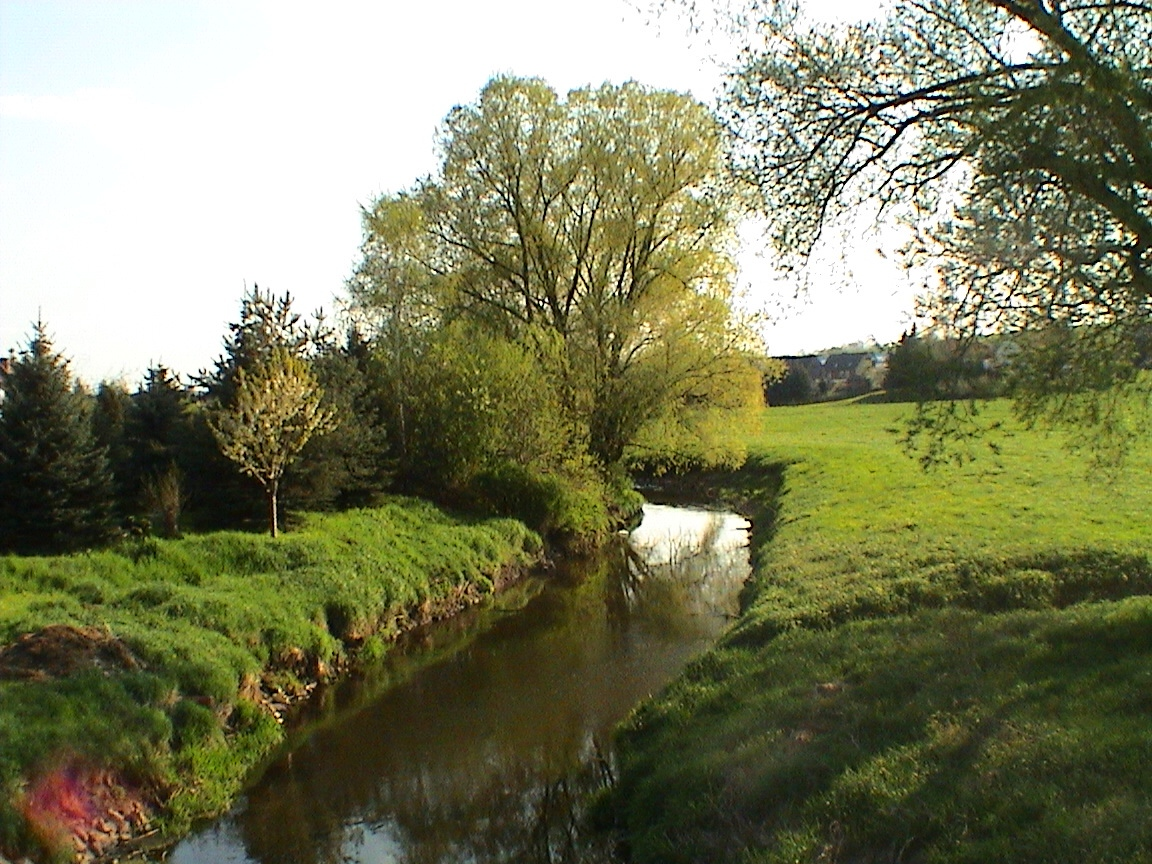
In Neukirchen before the dyke was built in 2005

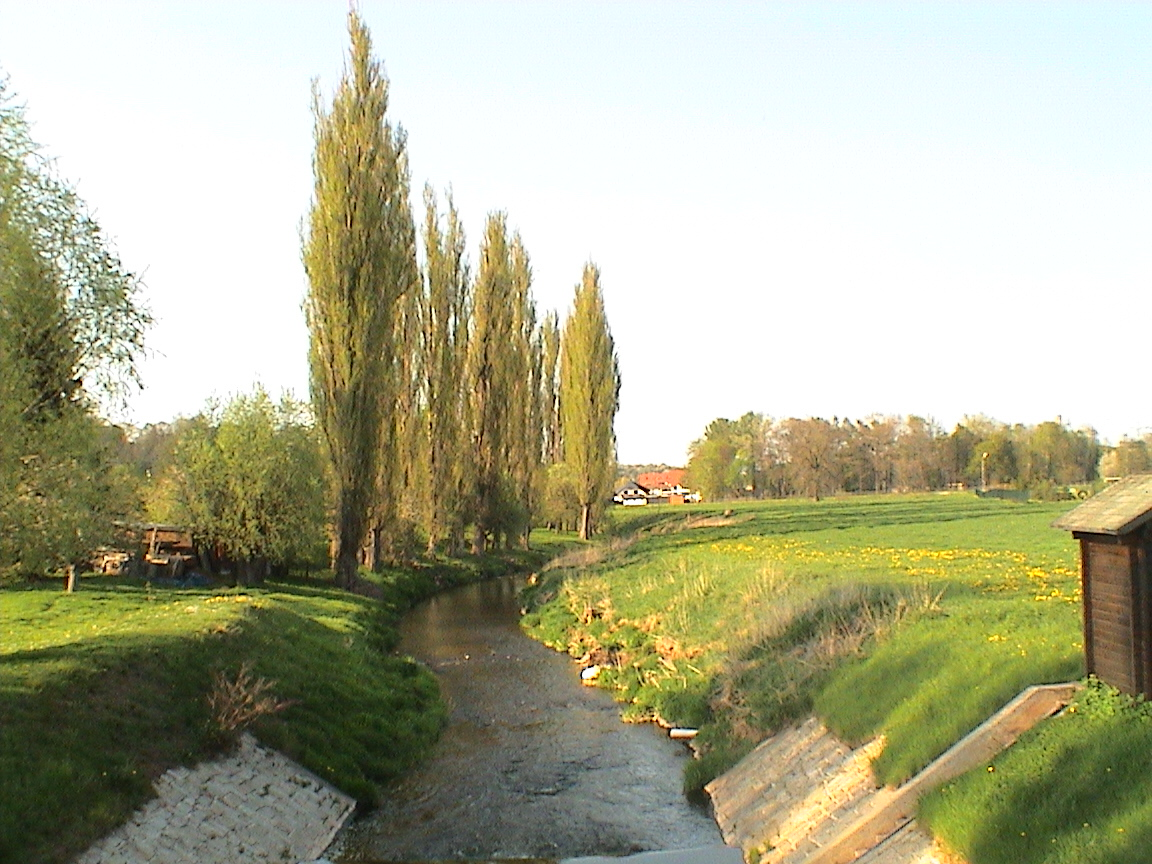
At the gauge in Neukirchen

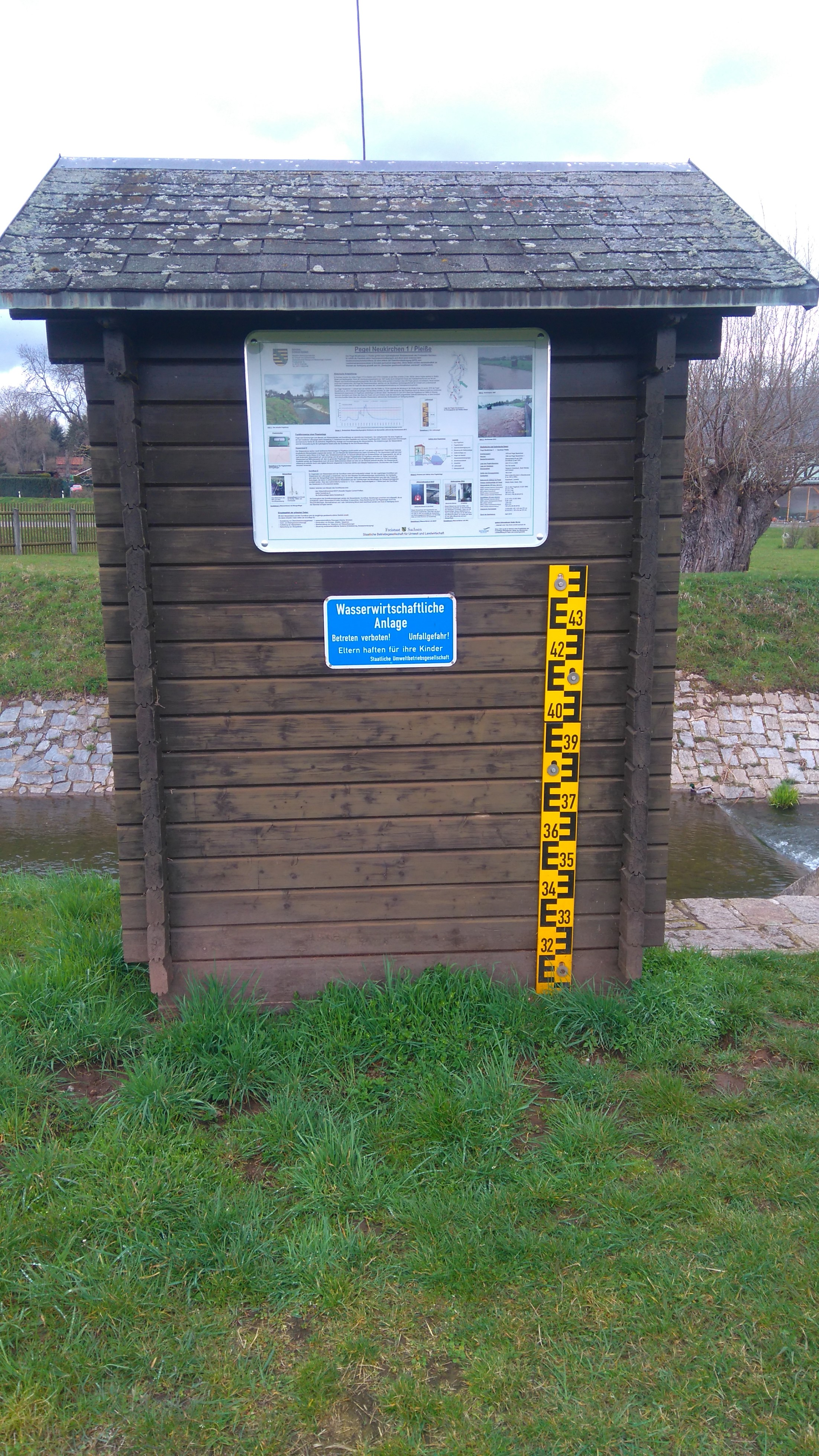
Level measuring station in Neukirchen

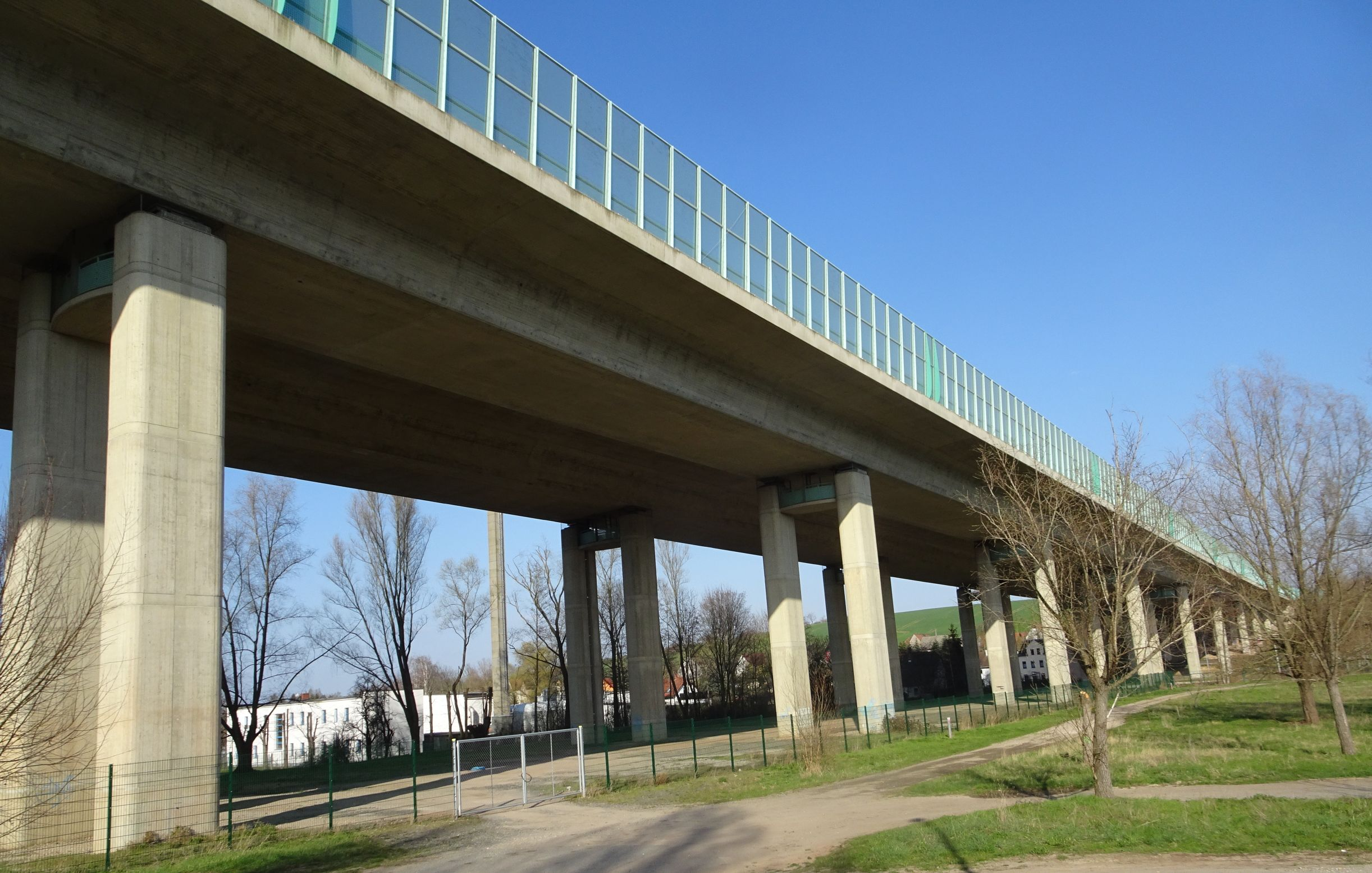
Pleiße viaduct in Frankenhausen (locality of Crimmitschau)

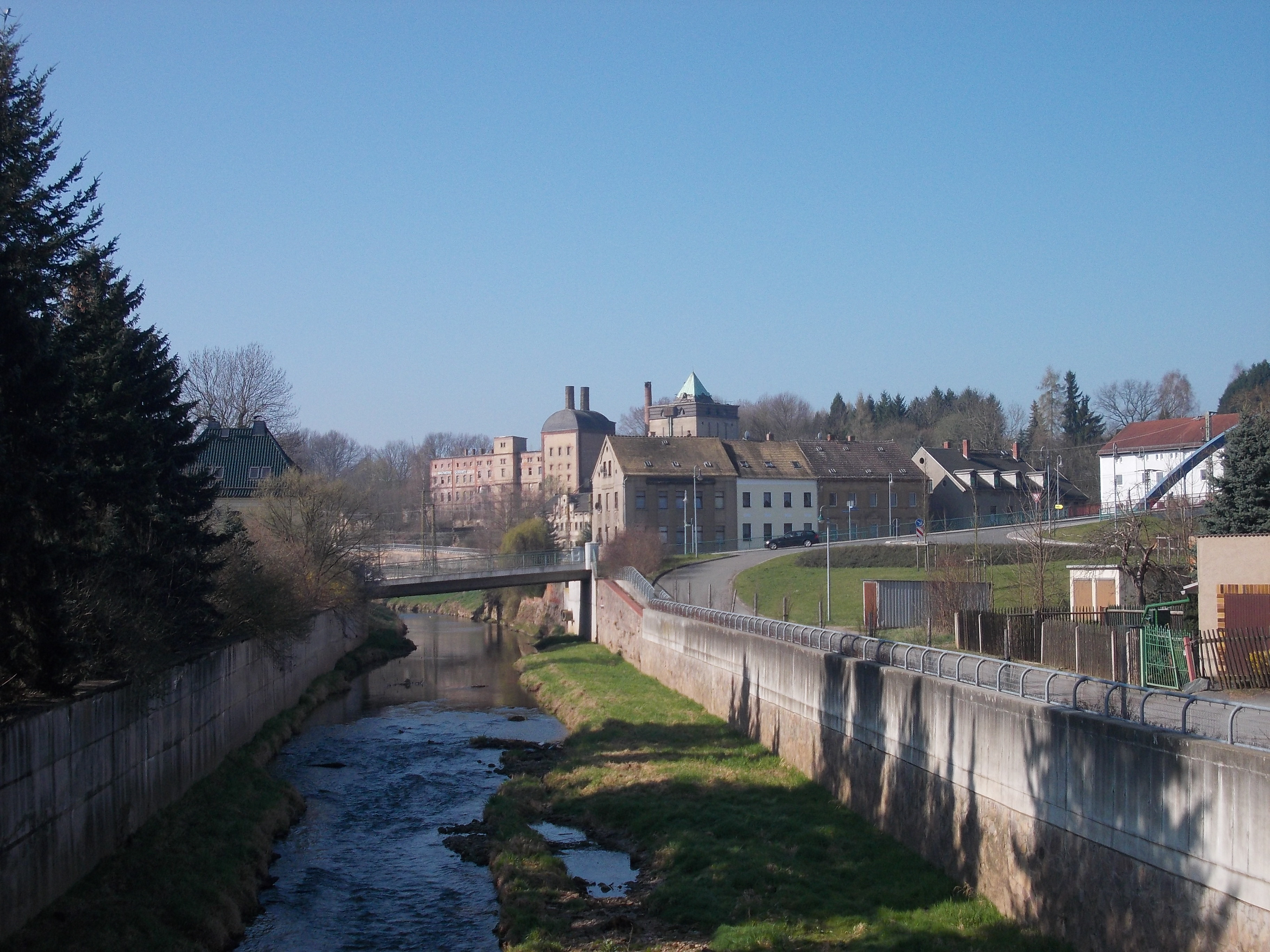
Near Gössnitz

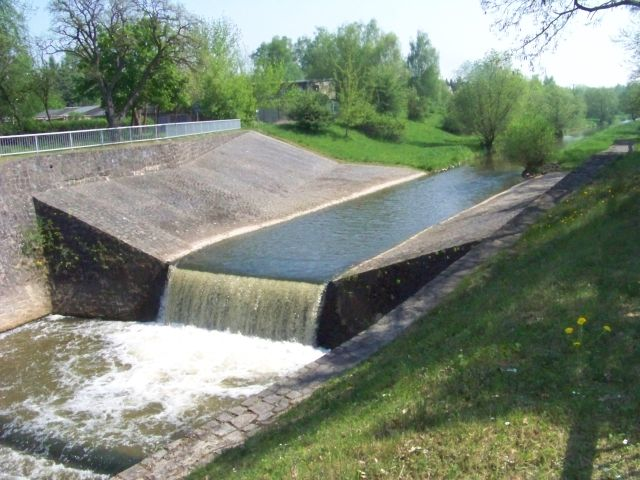
Cascade in Deutzen

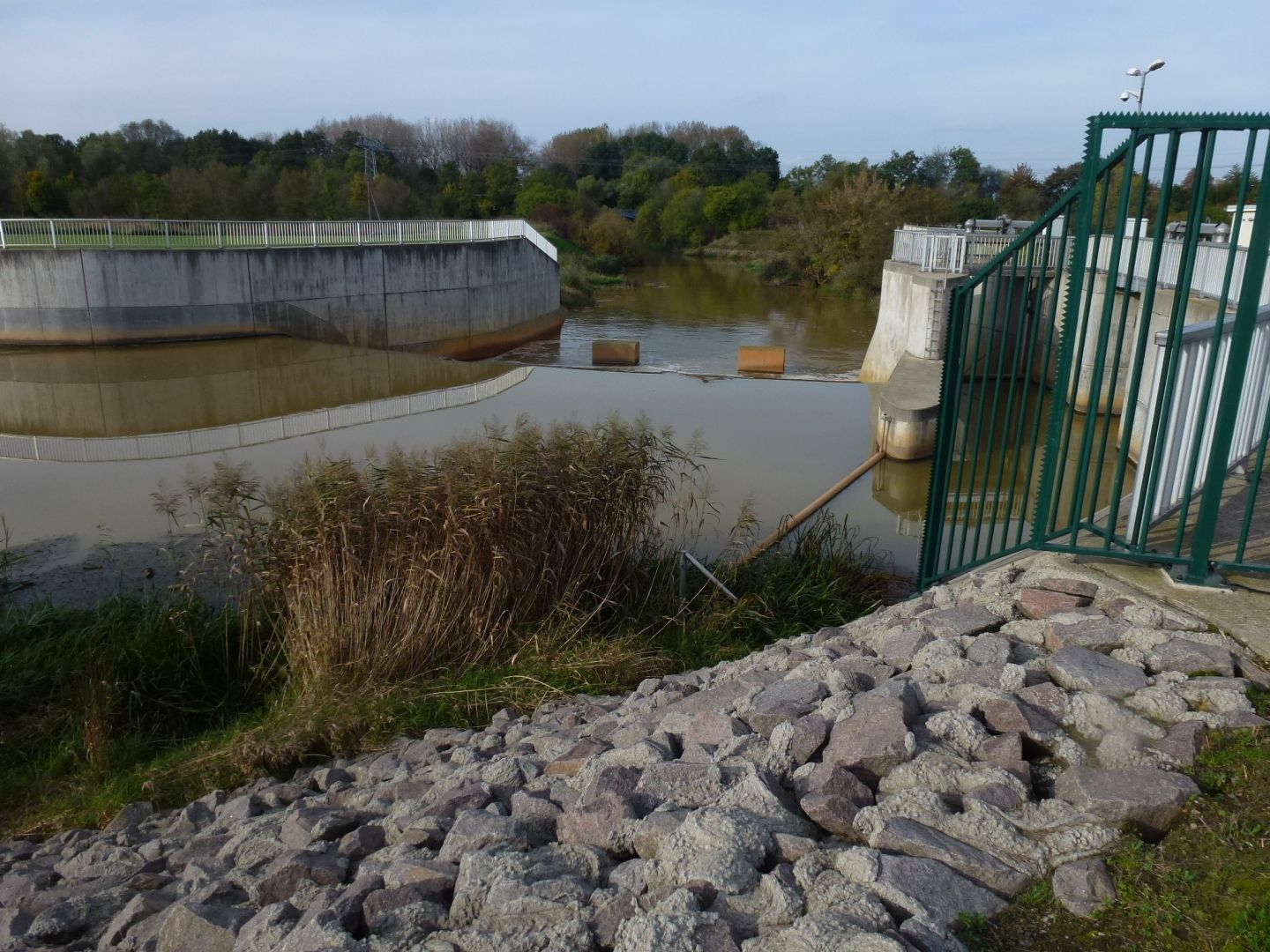
Weir at Rötha

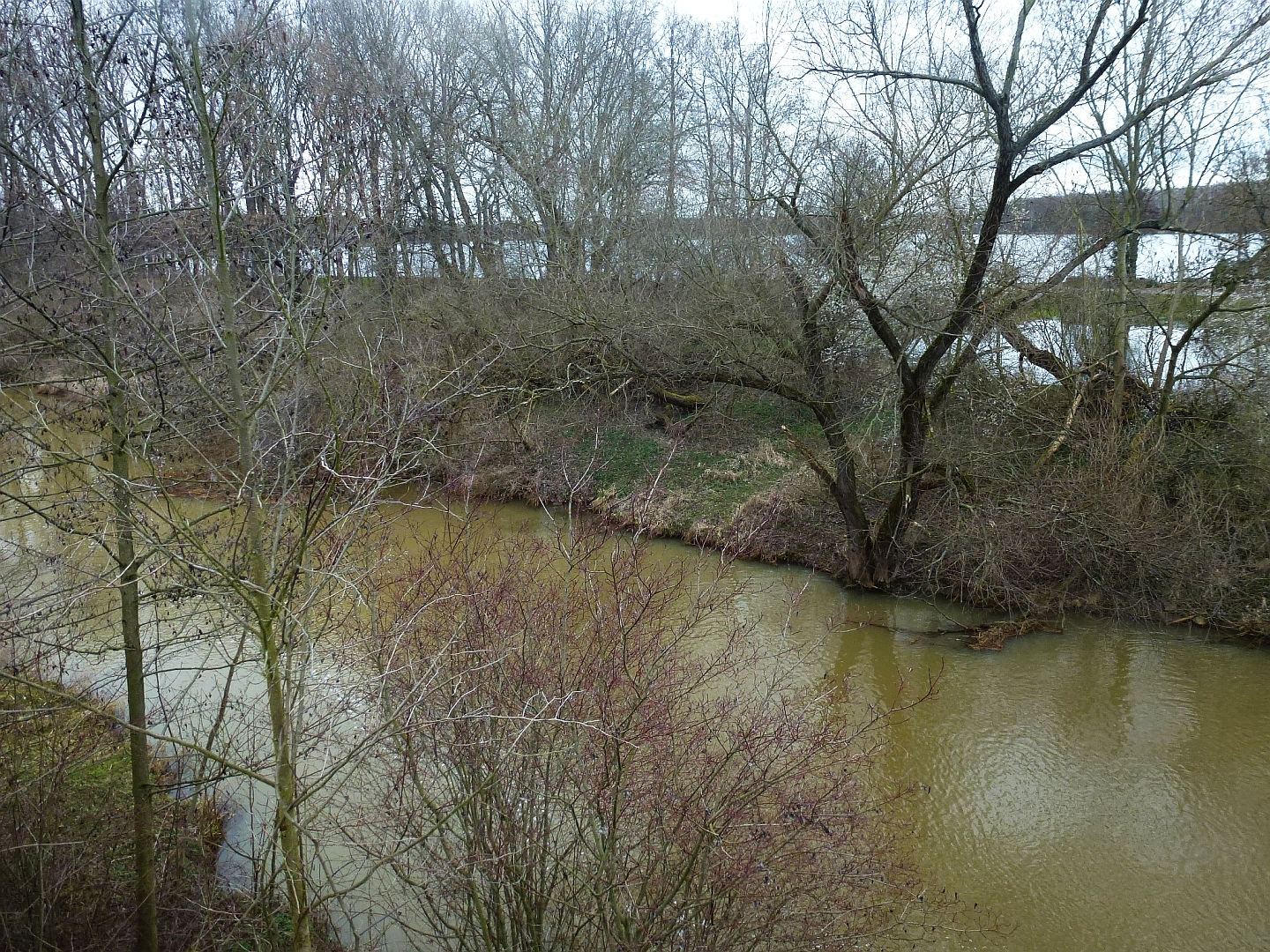
In front of the Rötha reservoir

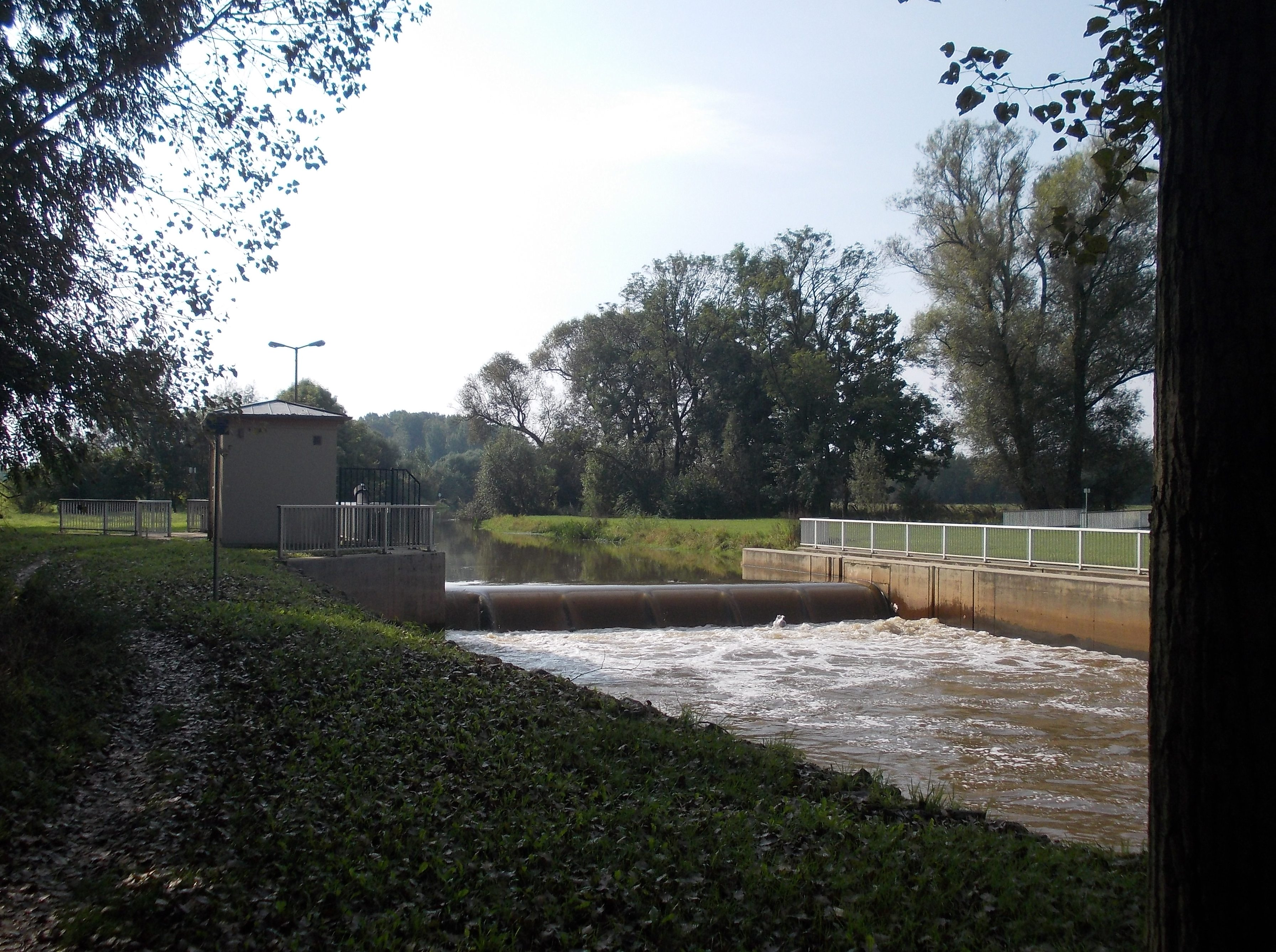
Weir at Gaulis, locality of Böhlen

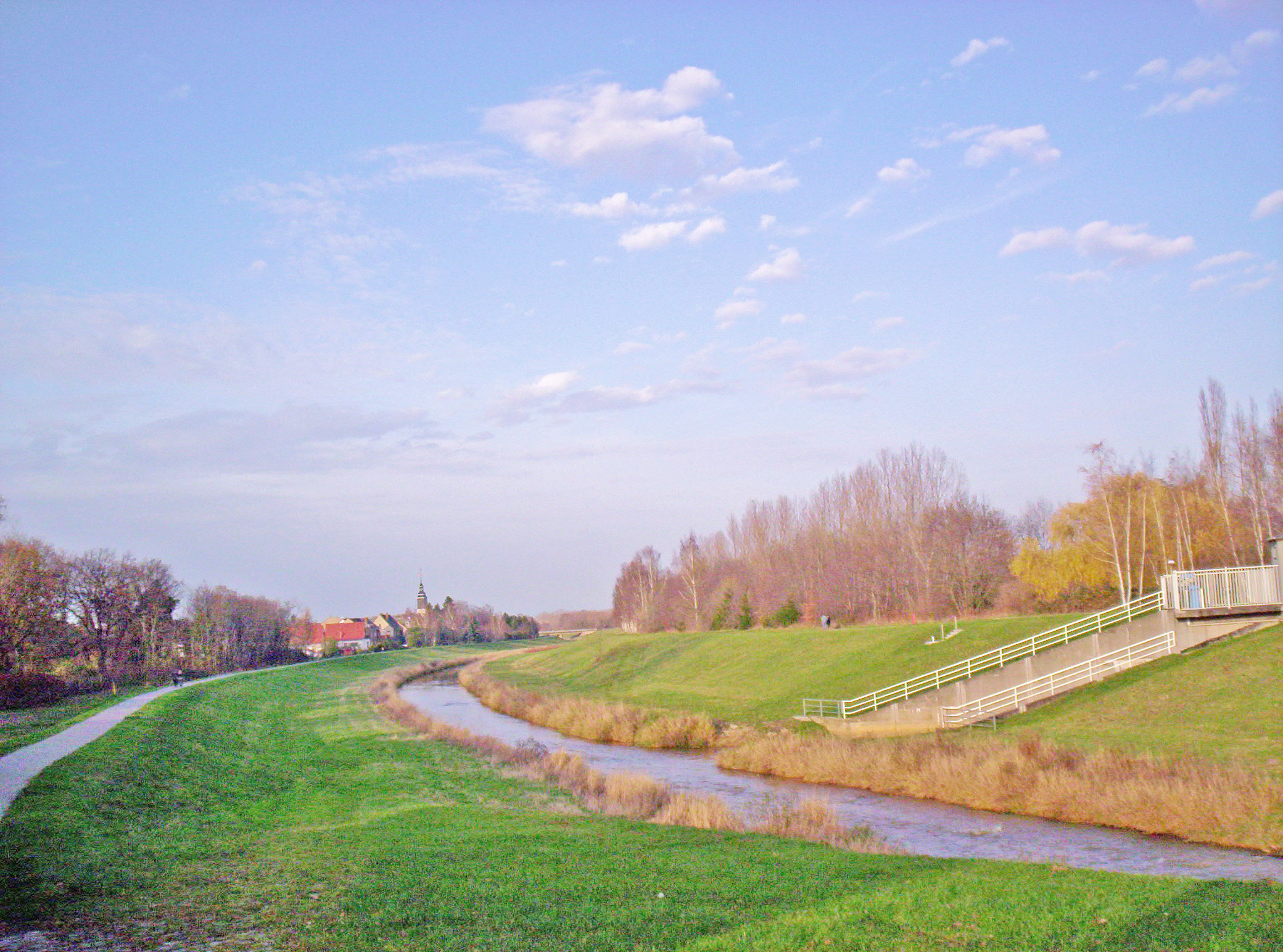
At Großdeuben, locality of Markkleeberg

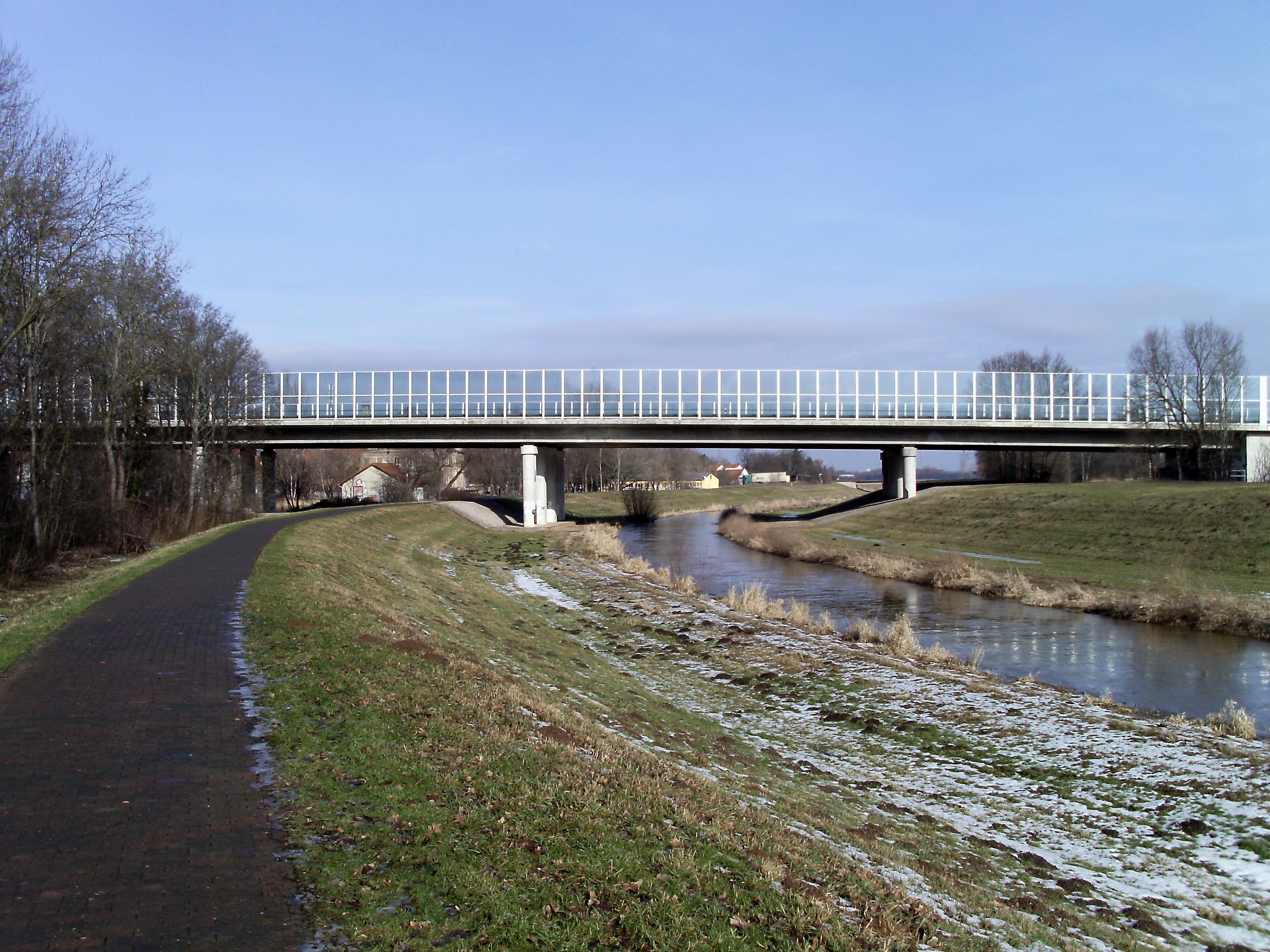
At Gaschwitz, locality of Markkleeberg

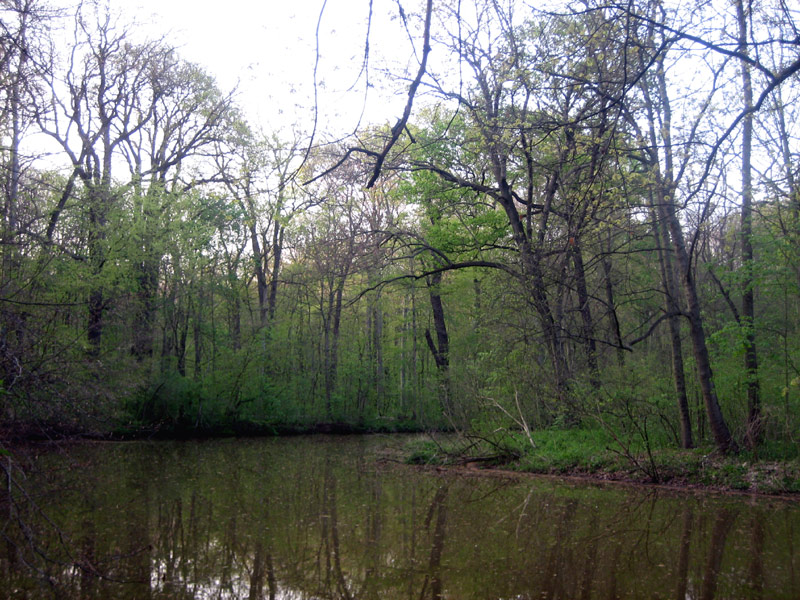
In the Leipzig Riverside Forest

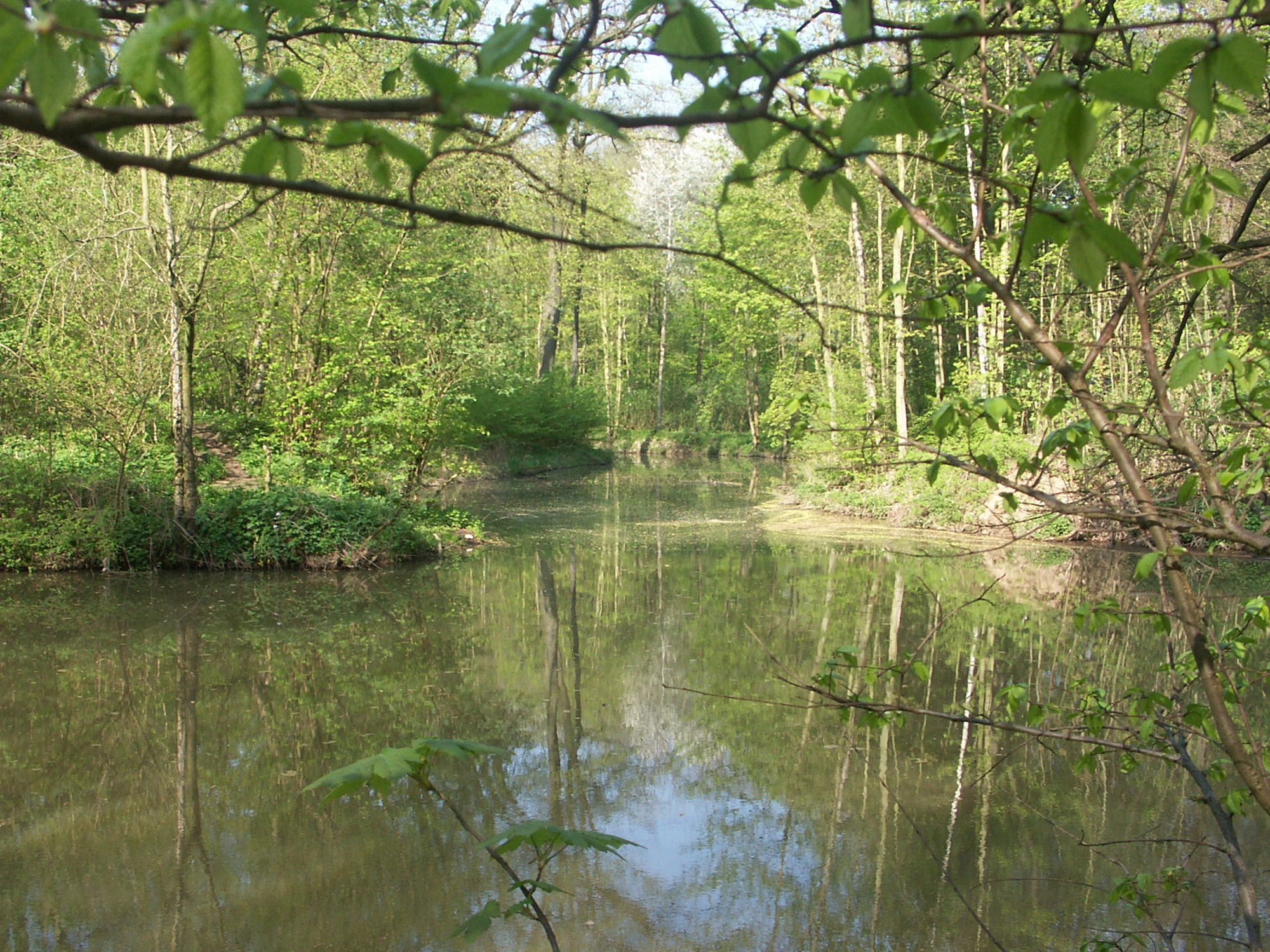
Mouth of the Elster raft ditch in Leipzig

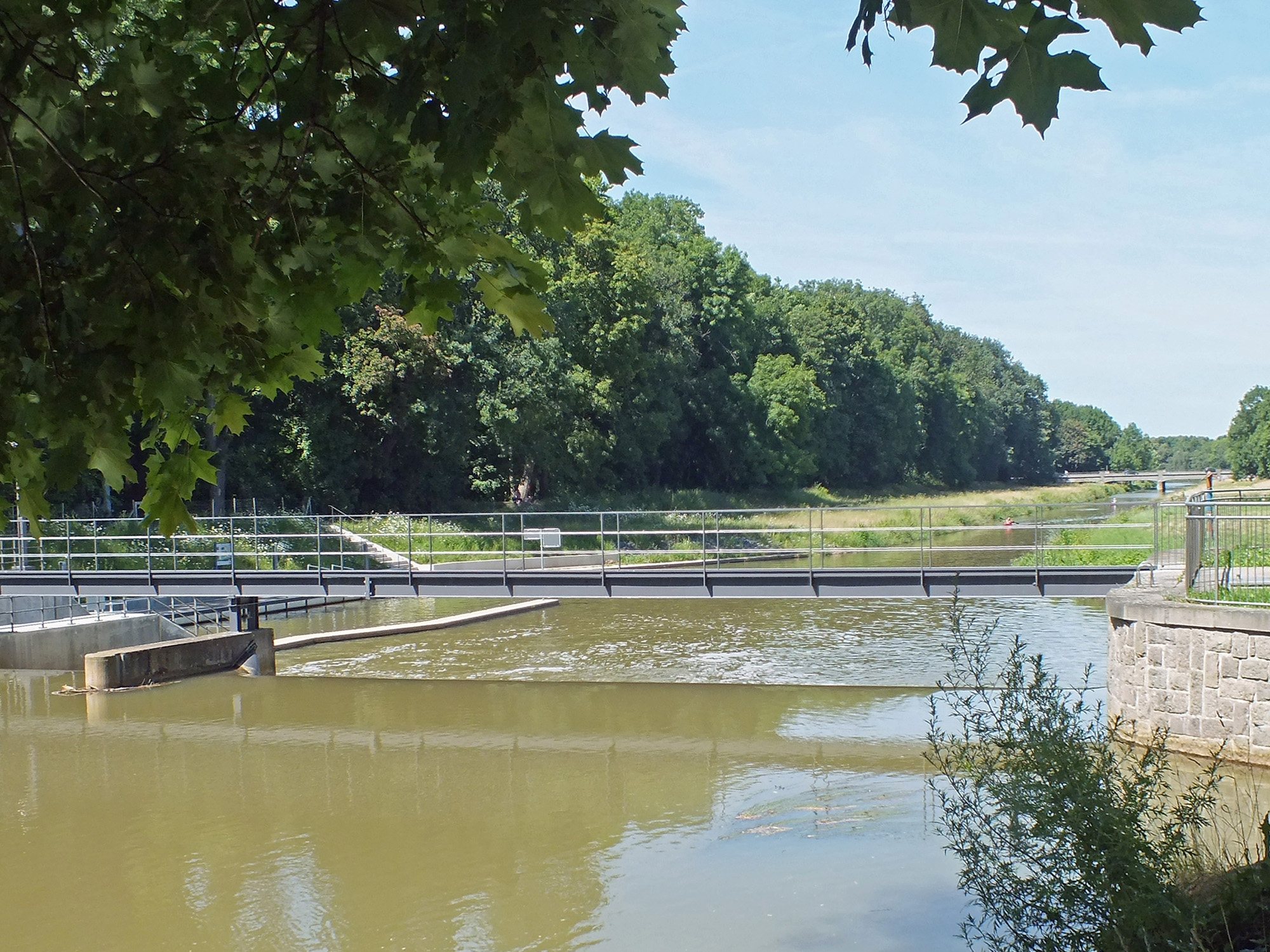
Connewitz weir, behind it the Pleiße flood channel

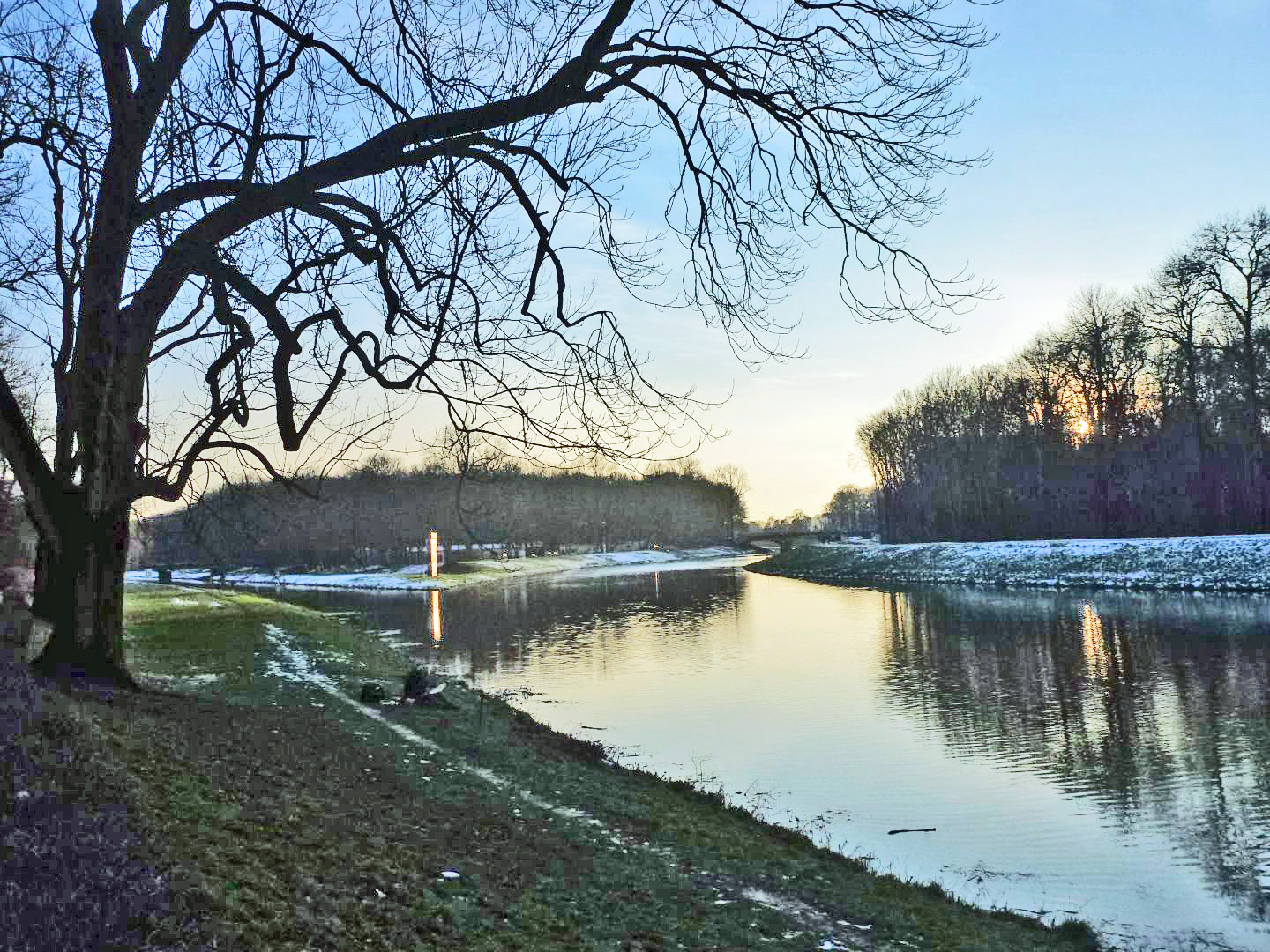
Mouth of the Pleiße flood channel (left) into the Elster flood channel in Leipzig

== See also ==
- Kleine Pleiße
- List of rivers of Saxony
- List of rivers of Thuringia
- Pleissenburg
