= Kleine Pleiße =

River in Germany

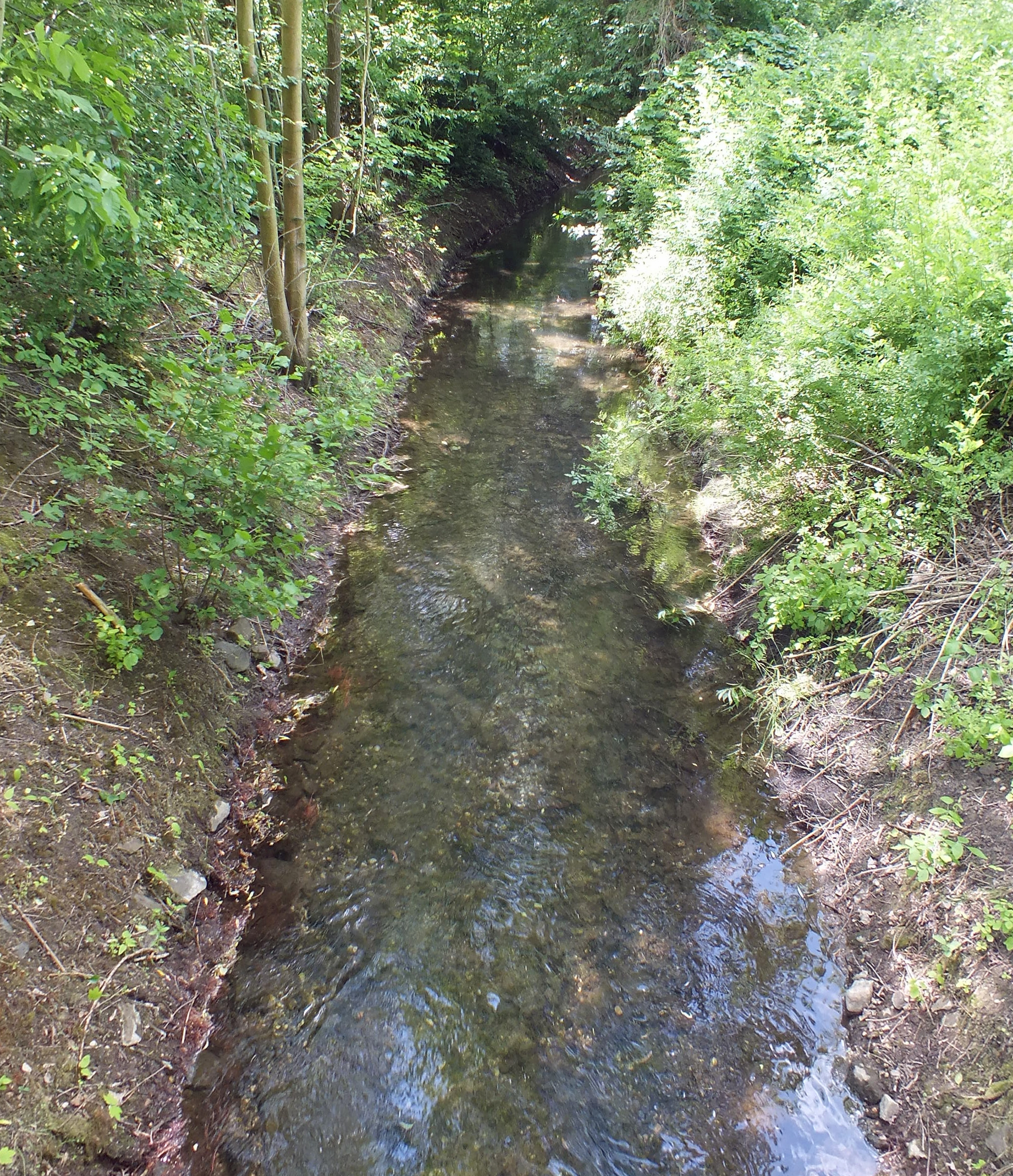

Location
- Country: Germany
- State: Saxony

Physical characteristics
- Source
  - location: From the Markkleeberger See
- Mouth
  - location: In Markkleeberg into the Pleiße, underwater at the AGRA weir
- Length: 1.75 km

Basin features
- Progression: Pleiße→ White Elster→ Saale→ Elbe→ North Sea
- River system: Elbe
- Landmarks: Cities: Leipzig; Large towns: Markkleeberg
- Bridges: Mühlbrücke 51°16′23.5″N 12°23′40.4″E

The Kleine Pleiße is a river in Saxony, Germany.

== See also ==
- List of rivers of Saxony
