= Gerstenberg =

- Municipality
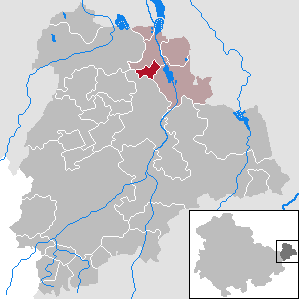
- Location of Gerstenberg within Altenburger Land district
- Interactive map of Gerstenberg
- Location within Germany Location within Thuringia
- Coordinates: 51°1′49″N 12°26′29″E
- Country: Germany
- State: Thuringia
- District: Altenburger Land
- Municipal assoc.: Pleißenaue
- Subdivisions: 2

Government
  - Mayor (2024–30): Uwe Patzelt

Area
  - Total: 3.13 km^{2} (1.21 sq mi)
- Elevation: 160 m (520 ft)

Population (2025-12-31)
  - Total: 462
  - Density: 148/km^{2} (382/sq mi)
- Time zone: UTC+01:00 (CET)
  - Summer (DST): UTC+02:00 (CEST)
- Postal codes: 04617
- Dialling codes: 03447
- Vehicle registration: ABG

Gerstenberg is a municipality in the district of Altenburger Land, in Thuringia, Germany. Gerstenberg was first mentioned in a document in 1227. The line of knights "von Gerstenberg" died out in 1710. As early as 1181, a fortification was mentioned in the district of Pöschwitz. This later manor passed into civil ownership in 1798. Members of the families served the dukes of Saxe-Gotha and Saxe-Altenburg. After the expropriation in 1951, what was once the largest farm was just a residential property with MTS and a small new farmer.

Gerstenberg belonged to the Wettin office of Altenburg, [2] [3] which was under the sovereignty of the following Ernestine duchies from the 16th century due to several divisions in the course of its existence: Duchy of Saxony (1554 to 1572), Duchy of Saxony-Weimar (1572 to 1603 ), Duchy of Saxony-Altenburg (1603 to 1672), Duchy of Saxony-Gotha-Altenburg (1672 to 1826). When the Ernestine duchies were reorganized in 1826, the place again became part of the Duchy of Saxony-Altenburg. After the administrative reform in the duchy, it belonged to the Eastern District (until 1900) [4] and to the Altenburg district office (from 1900). [5] From 1918 the village belonged to the Free State of Saxony-Altenburg, which was added to the State of Thuringia in 1920. In 1922 it came to the district of Altenburg.

The infrastructural modernization of the community began in 1880 with the establishment of the local volunteer fire brigade and continued in 1915 with the start of electrification and in 1952 with the construction of the first water pipeline. At the end of the Second World War in 1945, the place was initially occupied by the Americans and handed over to the Red Army in July 1945.

On July 1, 1950, Pöschwitz was incorporated. During the second district reform in the GDR in 1952, the existing states were dissolved and the districts were redesigned. Thus, Gerstenberg came with the Altenburg district to the Leipzig district. In 1990 the place and the district of Altenburg became Thuringian again. Since 1994 it has belonged to the Altenburger Land district.
