= Pleißenaue =

Municipal association in Thuringia, Germany

- Verwaltungsgemeinschaft
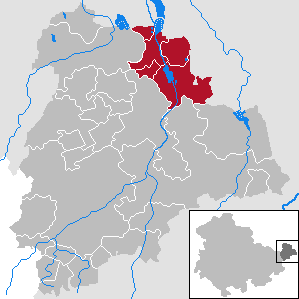
- Map of Altenburger Land highlighting Pleißenaue
- Interactive map of Pleißenaue
- Location within Germany Location within Thuringia
- Coordinates: 51°03′N 12°27′E
- Country: Germany
- State: Thuringia
- District: Altenburger Land
- Seat: Treben
- Subdivisions: 5 municipalities

Area
  - Total: 45.4 km^{2} (17.5 sq mi)

Population (2025-12-31)
  - Total: 4,948
  - Density: 109/km^{2} (282/sq mi)
- Time zone: UTC+01:00 (CET)
  - Summer (DST): UTC+02:00 (CEST)
- Website: www.vg-pleissenaue.de

Pleißenaue is a Verwaltungsgemeinschaft ("collective municipality") in the district Altenburger Land, in Thuringia, Germany. The seat of the Verwaltungsgemeinschaft is in Treben.

== Municipalities ==
The Verwaltungsgemeinschaft Pleißenaue consists of the following municipalities:

1. Fockendorf
2. Gerstenberg
3. Haselbach
4. Treben
5. Windischleuba
