= Haselbach, Thuringia =

Haselbach
- Municipality
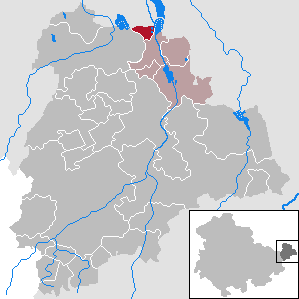
- Location of Haselbach within Altenburger Land district
- Interactive map of Haselbach
- Location within Germany Location within Thuringia
- Coordinates: 51°4′12″N 12°26′12″E
- Country: Germany
- State: Thuringia
- District: Altenburger Land
- Municipal assoc.: Pleißenaue

Government
  - Mayor (2022–28): Ralph Kirst

Area
  - Total: 2.76 km^{2} (1.07 sq mi)
- Elevation: 155 m (509 ft)

Population (2025-12-31)
  - Total: 799
  - Density: 289/km^{2} (750/sq mi)
- Time zone: UTC+01:00 (CET)
  - Summer (DST): UTC+02:00 (CEST)
- Postal codes: 04617
- Dialling codes: 034343
- Vehicle registration: ABG
- Website: www.gemeinde-haselbach.de

Haselbach (German pronunciation: [ˈhaːzl̩bax]) is a municipality in the district Altenburger Land, in Thuringia, Germany.
