= Treben =

- Municipality
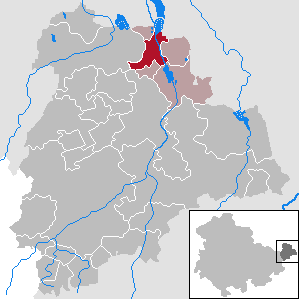
- Location of Treben within Altenburger Land district
- Interactive map of Treben
- Location within Germany Location within Thuringia
- Coordinates: 51°3′N 12°27′E
- Country: Germany
- State: Thuringia
- District: Altenburger Land
- Municipal assoc.: Pleißenaue
- Subdivisions: 4

Government
  - Mayor (2022–28): Klaus Hermann (CDU)

Area
  - Total: 10 km^{2} (3.9 sq mi)
- Elevation: 154 m (505 ft)

Population (2025-12-31)
  - Total: 1,114
  - Density: 110/km^{2} (290/sq mi)
- Time zone: UTC+01:00 (CET)
  - Summer (DST): UTC+02:00 (CEST)
- Postal codes: 04617
- Dialling codes: 034343
- Vehicle registration: ABG
- Website: www.treben.de

Treben (German pronunciation: [ˈtʁeːbn̩]) is a municipality in the district Altenburger Land in Thuringia, Germany.

== History ==
Within the German Empire (1871–1918), Treben was part of the Duchy of Saxe-Altenburg.
