= Windischleuba =

- Municipality
- Coat of arms

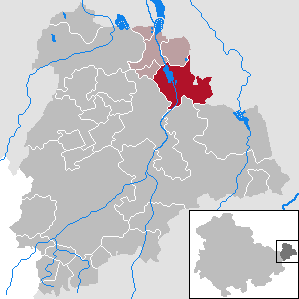
- Location of Windischleuba within Altenburger Land district
- Interactive map of Windischleuba
- Location within Germany Location within Thuringia
- Coordinates: 51°1′N 12°28′E
- Country: Germany
- State: Thuringia
- District: Altenburger Land
- Municipal assoc.: Pleißenaue
- Subdivisions: 8

Government
  - Mayor (2020–26): Gerd Reinboth

Area
  - Total: 20.72 km^{2} (8.00 sq mi)
- Elevation: 194 m (636 ft)

Population (2025-12-31)
  - Total: 1,821
  - Density: 87.89/km^{2} (227.6/sq mi)
- Time zone: UTC+01:00 (CET)
  - Summer (DST): UTC+02:00 (CEST)
- Postal codes: 04603
- Dialling codes: 03447
- Vehicle registration: ABG

Windischleuba is a municipality in the district Altenburger Land, in Thuringia, Germany.

== History ==
Within the German Empire (1871–1918), Windischleuba was part of the Duchy of Saxe-Altenburg.
