= Fockendorf =

- Municipality
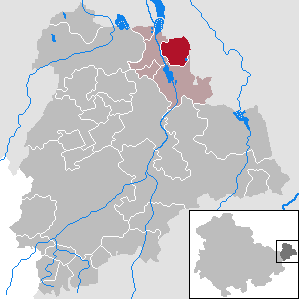
- Location of Fockendorf within Altenburger Land district
- Interactive map of Fockendorf
- Location within Germany Location within Thuringia
- Coordinates: 51°3′N 12°28′E
- Country: Germany
- State: Thuringia
- District: Altenburger Land
- Municipal assoc.: Pleißenaue
- Subdivisions: 2

Government
  - Mayor (2022–28): Karsten Jähnig

Area
  - Total: 8.83 km^{2} (3.41 sq mi)
- Elevation: 155–166 m (509–545 ft)

Population (2025-12-31)
  - Total: 752
  - Density: 85.2/km^{2} (221/sq mi)
- Time zone: UTC+01:00 (CET)
  - Summer (DST): UTC+02:00 (CEST)
- Postal codes: 04617
- Dialling codes: 034343
- Vehicle registration: ABG

Fockendorf is a municipality in the district Altenburger Land, in Thuringia, Germany.
