= Markkleeberg =

Town in Saxony, Germany

- Town
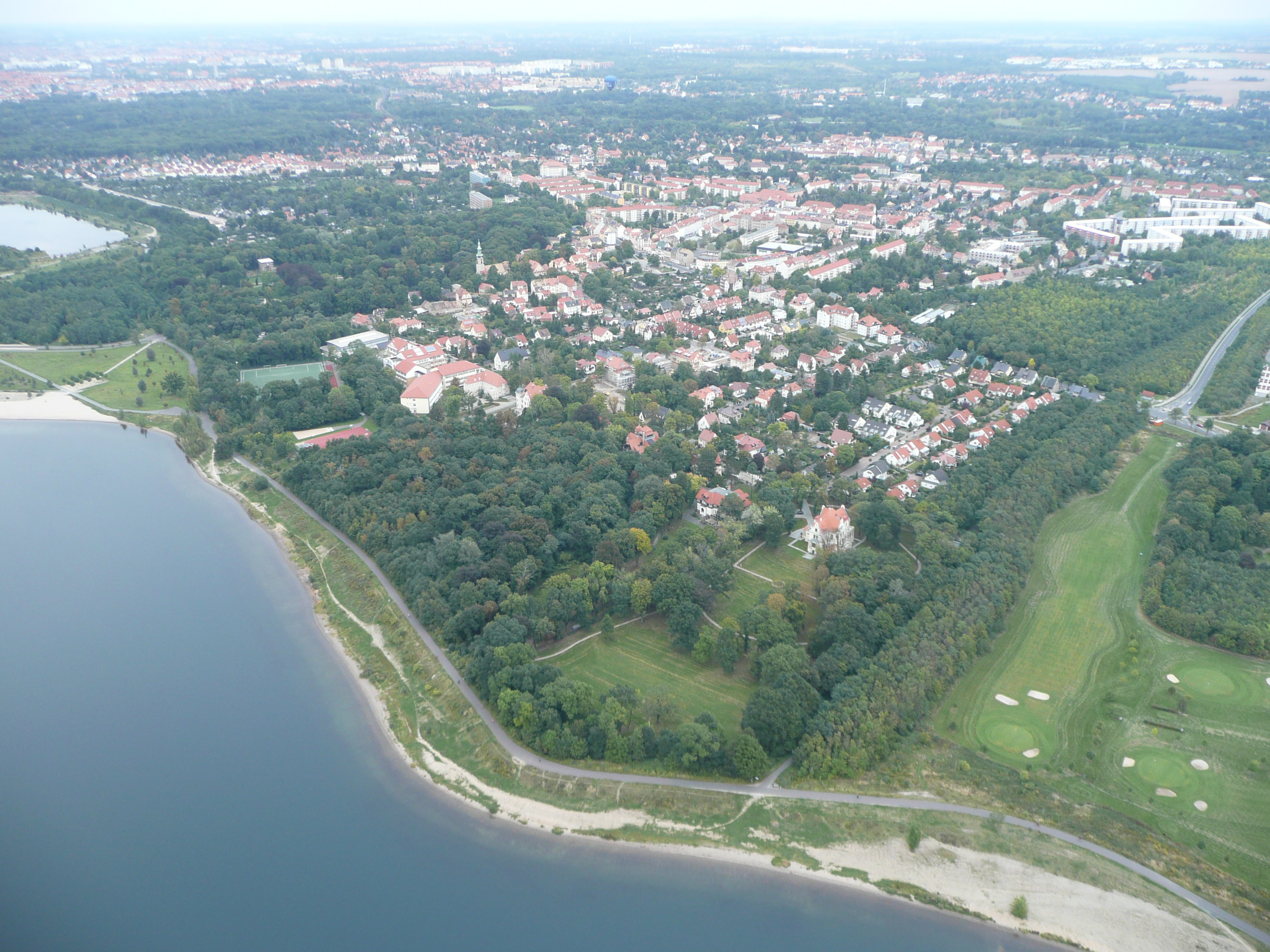

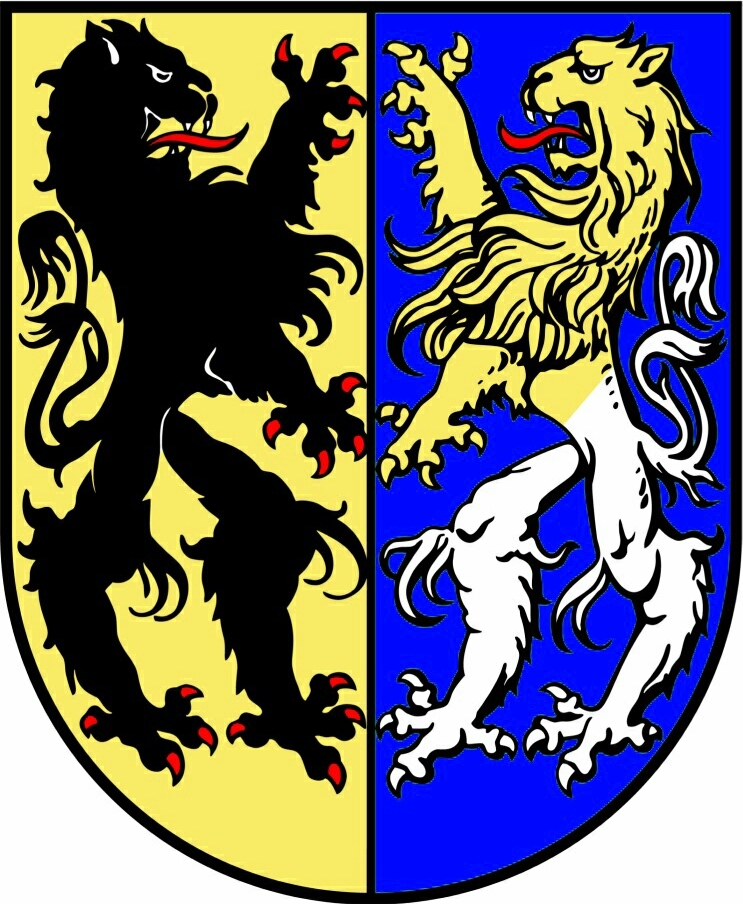
- Coat of arms

- Location of Markkleeberg within Leipzig district
- Interactive map of Markkleeberg
- Location within Germany Location within Saxony
- Coordinates: 51°16′40″N 12°23′00″E
- Country: Germany
- State: Saxony
- District: Leipzig
- Subdivisions: 9

Government
  - Mayor (2020–27): Karsten Schütze (SPD)

Area
  - Total: 31.36 km^{2} (12.11 sq mi)
- Elevation: 132 m (433 ft)

Population (2025-12-31)
  - Total: 25,354
  - Density: 808.5/km^{2} (2,094/sq mi)
- Time zone: UTC+01:00 (CET)
  - Summer (DST): UTC+02:00 (CEST)
- Postal codes: 04416
- Dialling codes: 0341, 034297, 034299
- Vehicle registration: L, BNA, GHA, GRM, MTL, WUR
- Website: Markkleeberg.de

Markkleeberg (German pronunciation: [ˈmaʁk(k)leːbɛʁk]) is an affluent suburb of Leipzig, located in the Leipzig district of the Free State of Saxony, Germany. The river Pleiße runs through the city, which borders Leipzig to the north and to the west.

Markkleeberg is known to be the entry point to a region of recultivated open-cast mining lakes south of Leipzig dubbed the Leipziger Neuseenland.

== History ==
The town now called Markkleeberg has its origins in several towns that have been merged over the years. The center of modern-day Markkleeberg used to be called Oetzsch. It was merged with the smaller outlying district Markkleeberg in 1911 and renamed Oetzsch-Markkleeberg. Oetzsch-Markkleeberg was in turn merged with Gautzsch and the whole town was called "Markkleeberg", although Markkleeberg was the smallest, because it sounded most Germanic at a time of Nazi-led Germanisation.

The etymology of Markkleeberg may be "clover hill market town". The name of Oetzsch has most likely a Wendish origin. In 1316 it was mentioned in a document as "Euschiz". The village originally had the form of a Rundling.

In 1813 much of the Battle of Leipzig took place where today's Markkleeberg is situated.

During 1944 and 1945, a forced labor camp for women was established in the town, initially a subcamp of the Ravensbrück concentration camp and later of Buchenwald. Among the inmates were a thousand Jewish women from Hungary and 250 French resistance fighters. In early April 1945, the surviving inmates were transferred to the Mauthausen-Gusen camp in Austria.

Today, Markkleeberg is a growing town because of its proximity to Leipzig.

== Historical population ==
(Source since 1998: Statistical bureau of Saxony)

Year	Population
1946	20,517
1950	20,130
1960	20,545
1981	20,622
1984	19,811
1995	20,415
1997	20,264

Year	Population
1998	22,728
1999	23,157
2000	23,157
2001	23,087
2002	23,139
2003	23,306
2004	23,639

Year	Population
2005	23,806
2006	23,913
2007	24,021
2008	24,020
2009	24,254
2010	24,338

Year	Population
2011	24,402
2012	23,869
2013	23.940
2015	24,240
2016	24,477

== Culture ==
Markkleeberg is a well-known tourist destination. Cospudener See, Markkleeberger See, Kanupark Markkleeberg as well as many parks are close to the city, such as the Agra-Park which also houses the German Photography Museum.

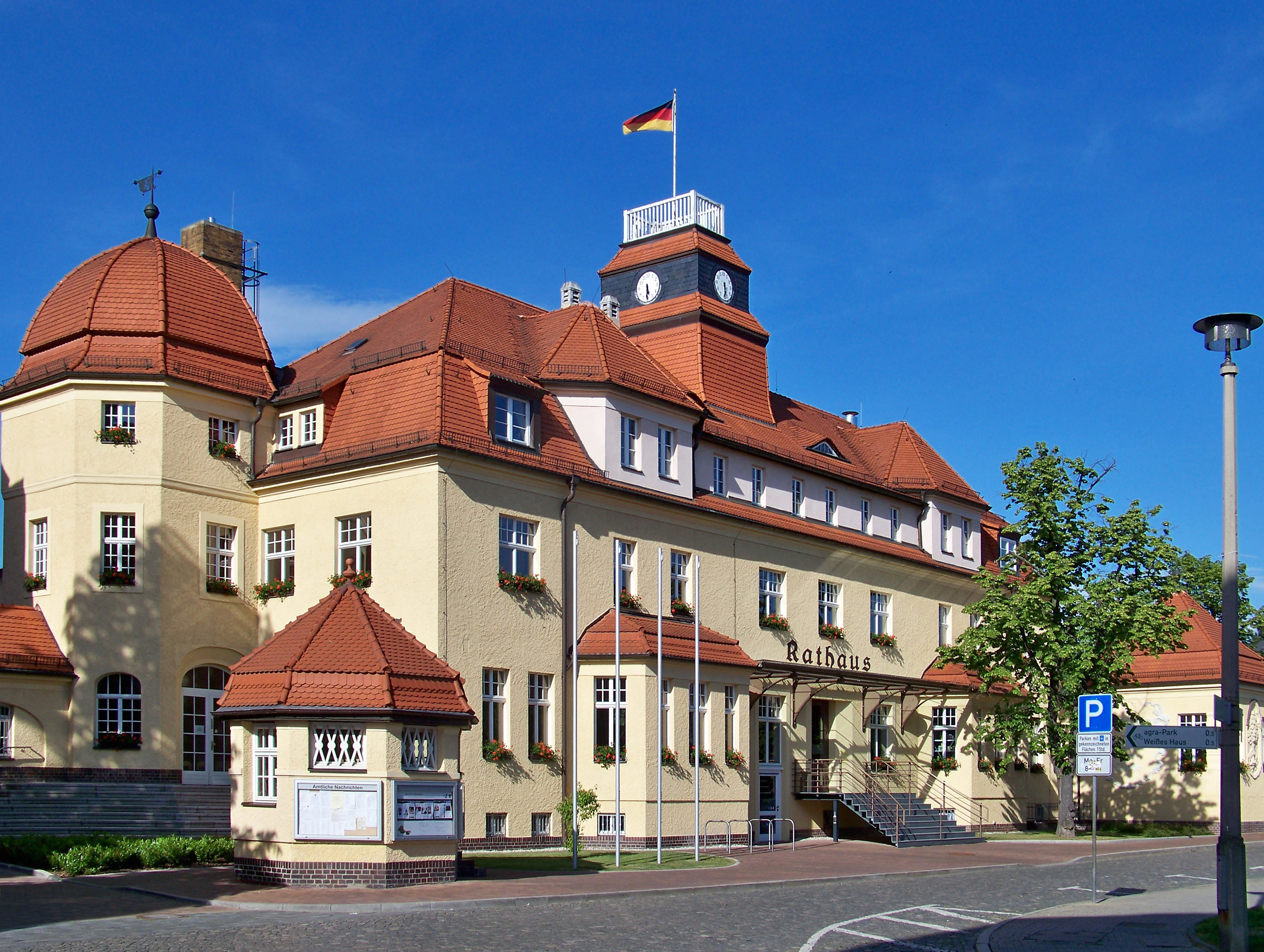
Markkleeberg town hall

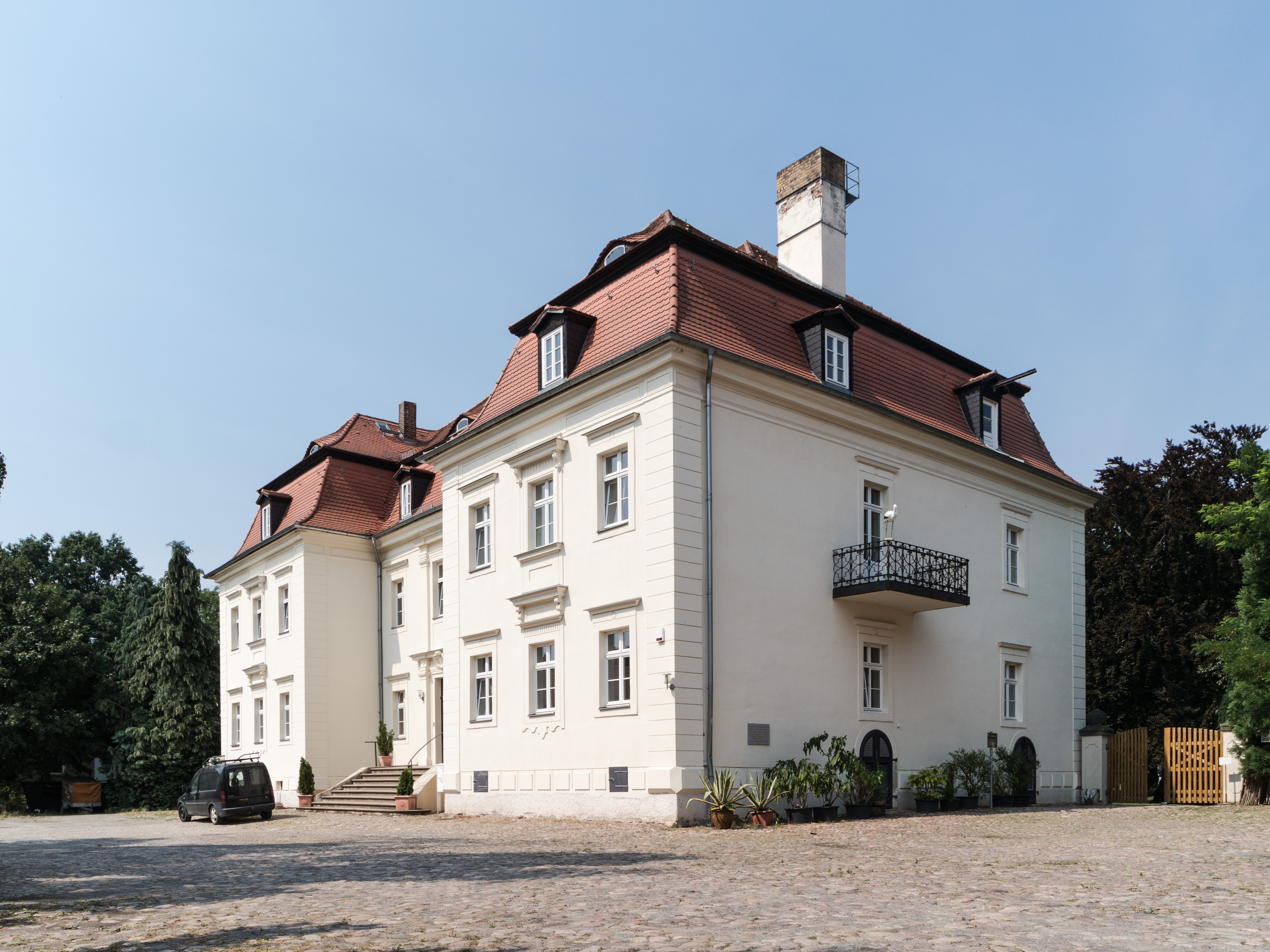
Markkleeberg castle

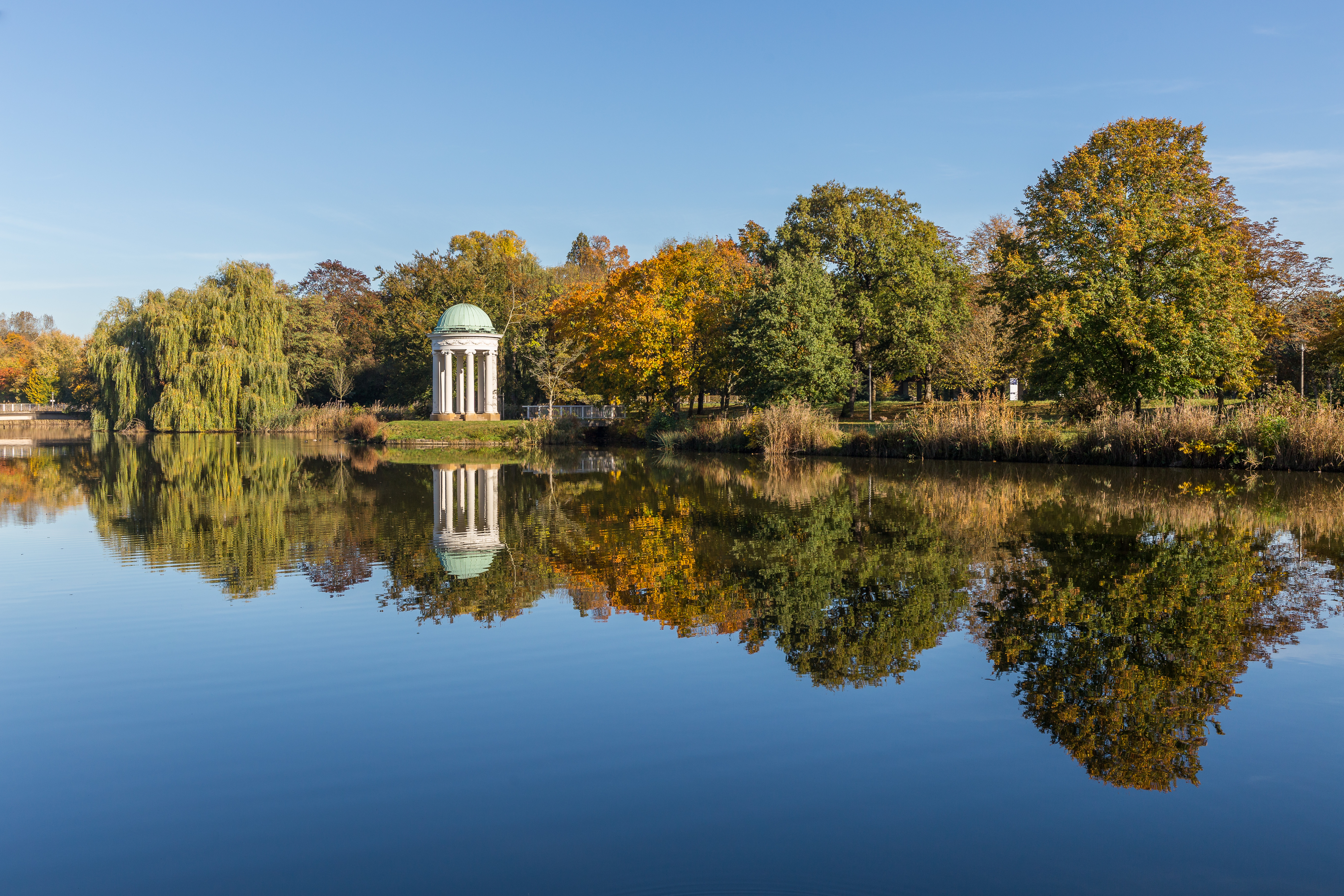
Musentempel, monopteros in the Agra park

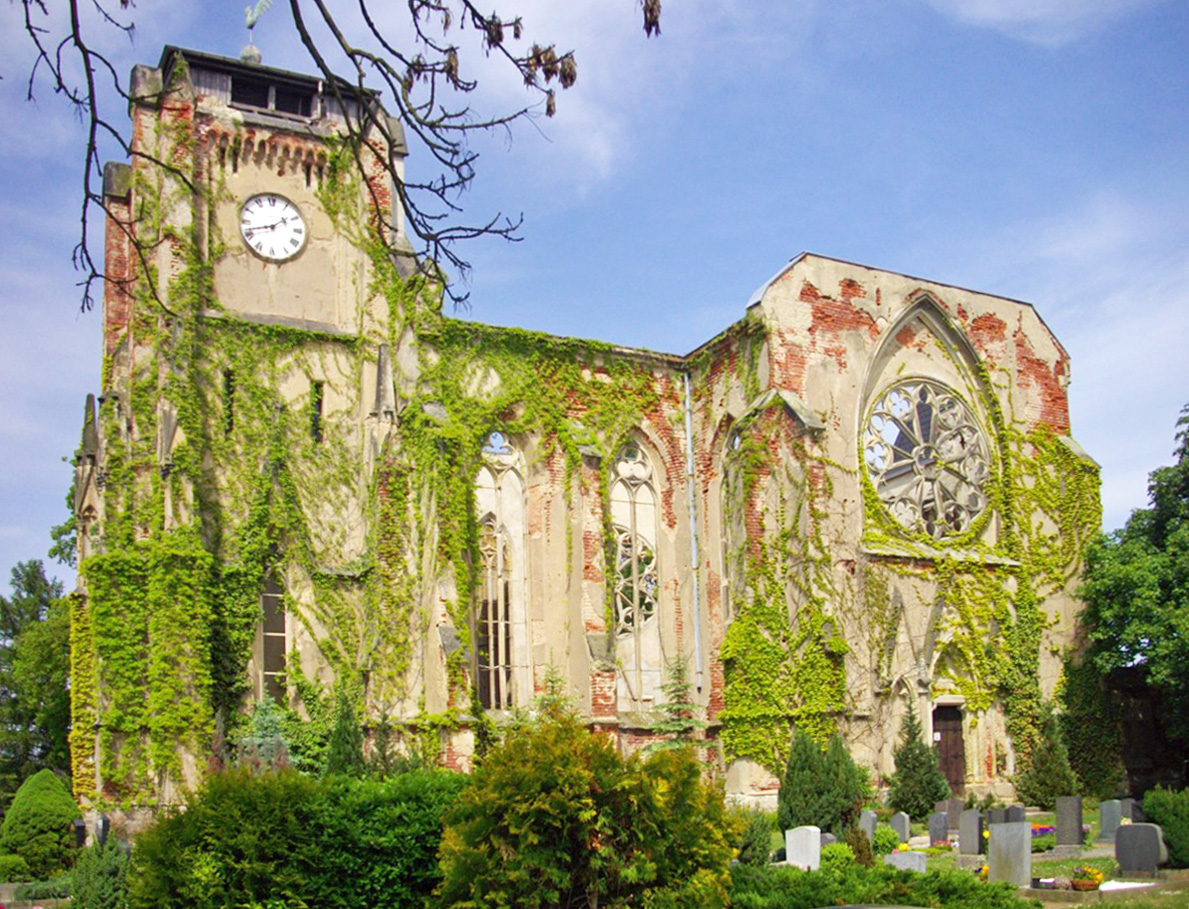
Ruined church in Wachau

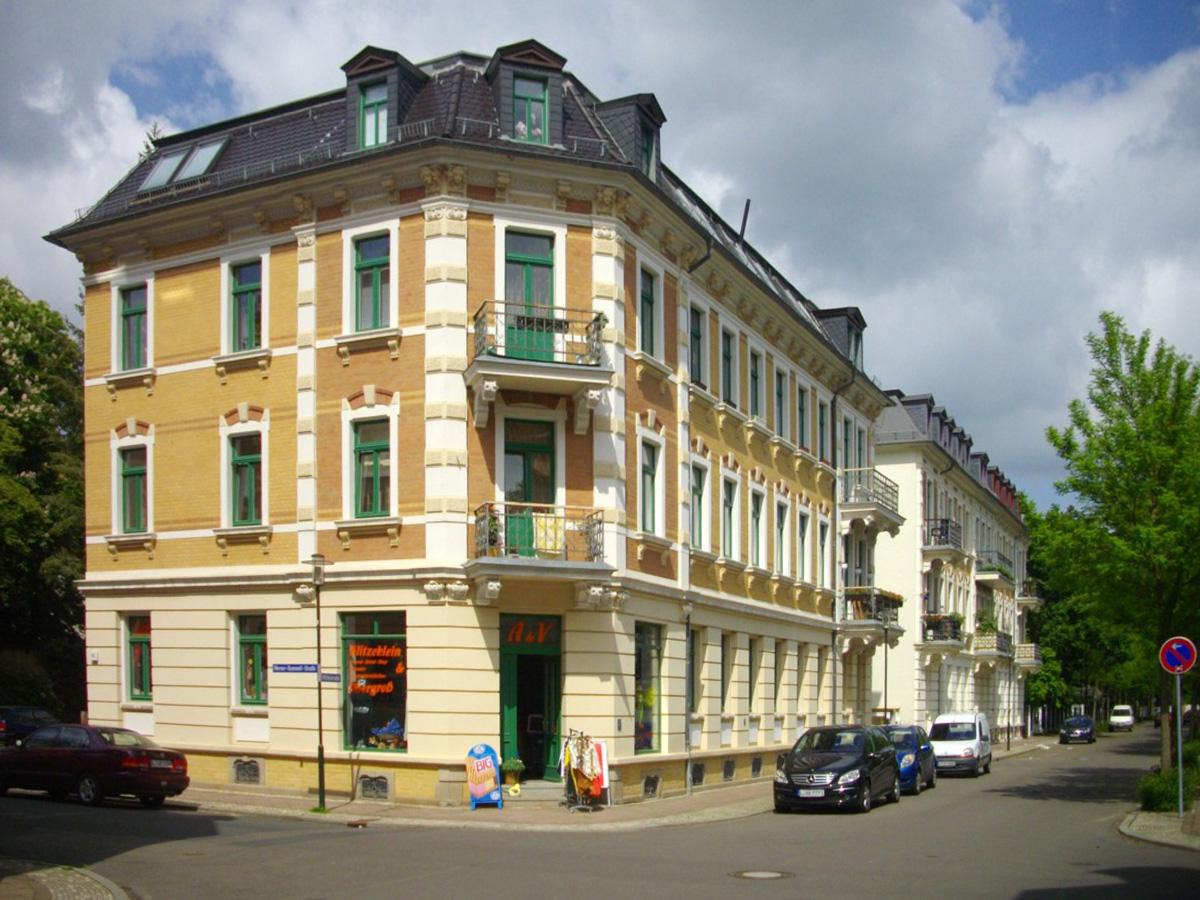
Gründerzeit house in Markkleeberg

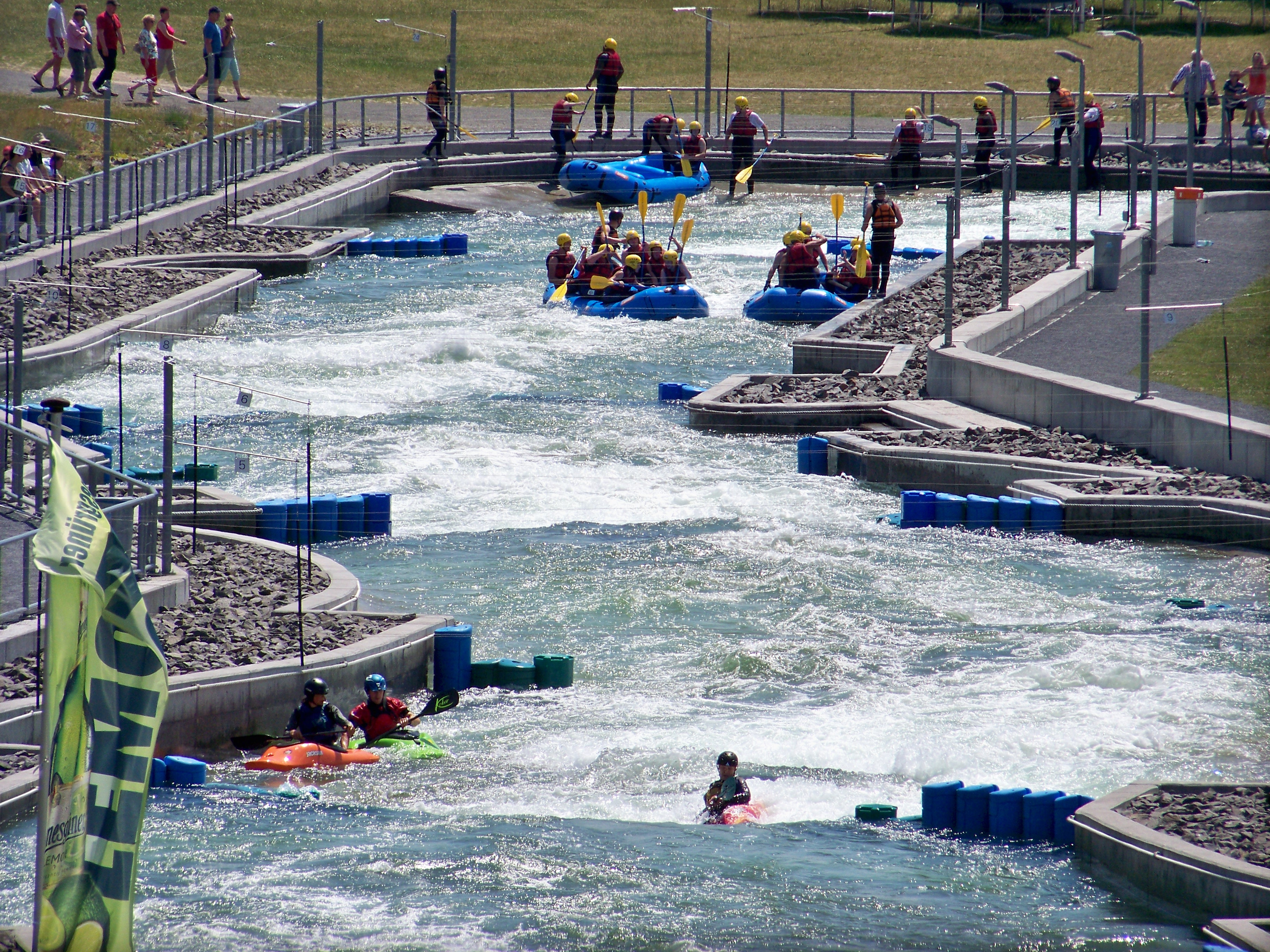
Kanupark Markkleeberg

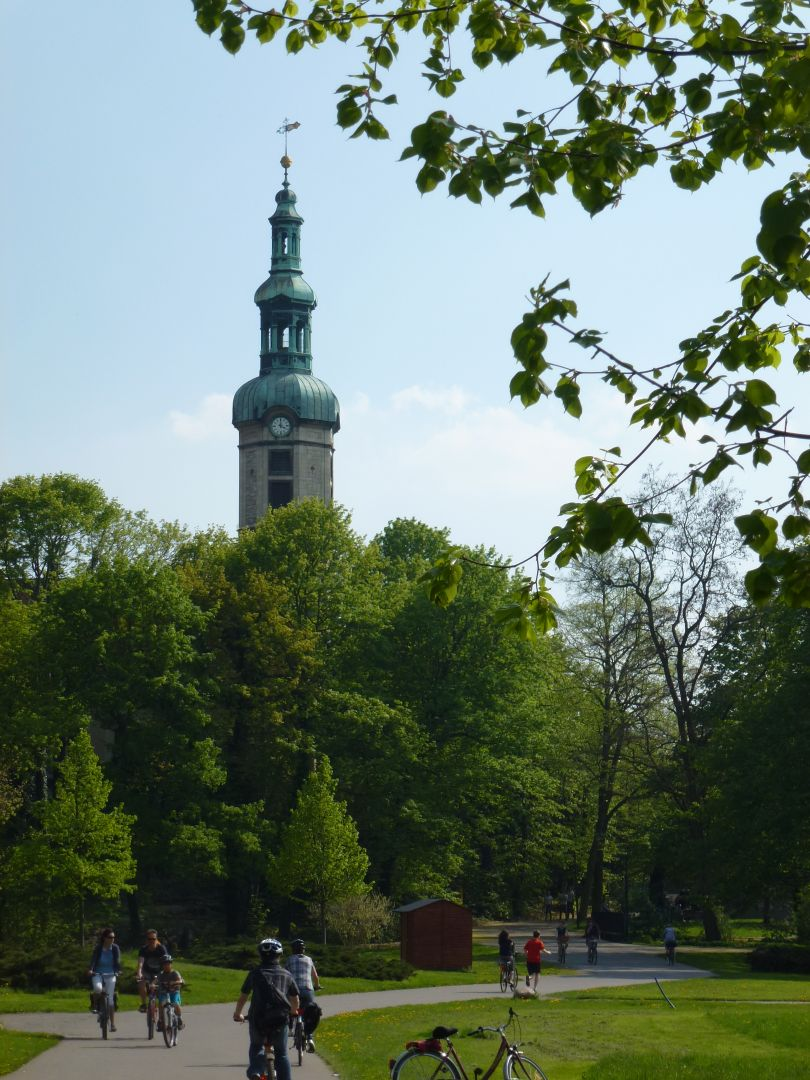
Kees'scher park and Martin Luther church

== Twin towns – sister cities ==
Markkleeberg is twinned with:

- Boville Ernica, Italy
- Neusäß, Germany
- Pierre-Bénite, France
- Zărnești, Romania
