= Jena Paradies station =

Rail station in Germany

Jena Paradies
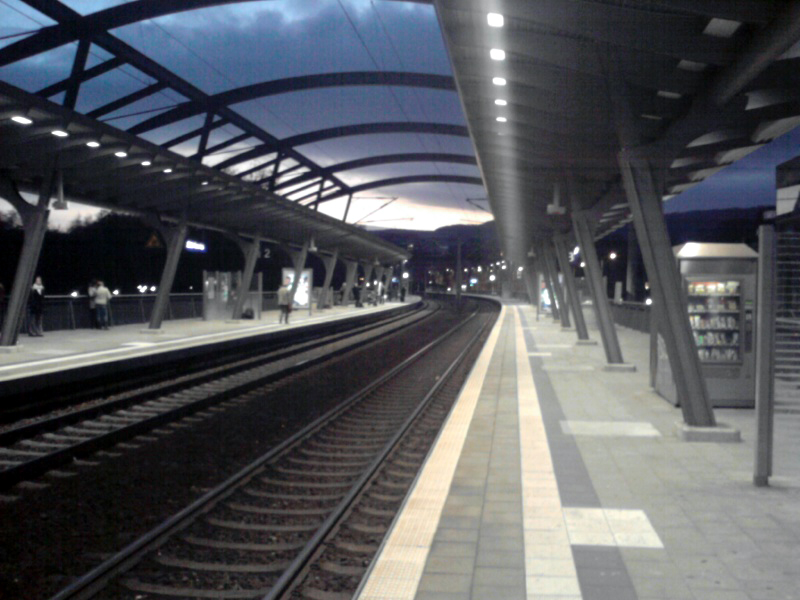
- Station platforms

General information
- Location: Jena, Thuringia; Germany
- Coordinates: 50°55′25″N 11°35′02″E
- Owner: Deutsche Bahn
- Operator: DB Station&Service
- Line: Großheringen–Saalfeld (Saale) (KBS 560)
- Platforms: 2

Construction
- Accessible: Yes

Other information
- Station code: 3043
- DS100 code: UJP
- IBNR: 8001906
- Category: 3
- Fare zone: VMT
- Website: www.bahnhof.de

History
- Opened: 15 October 1880; 145 years ago
- Electrified: 1941–1946; 28 May 1995; 31 years ago

Passengers
- 3,500 per day
Services
Preceding station	DB Fernverkehr	Following station
Jena-Göschwitz towards München Hbf	ICE 18	Naumburg (Saale) Hbf towards Berlin Gesundbrunnen
Jena-Göschwitz towards Karlsruhe Hbf	IC 61	Naumburg (Saale) Hbf towards Leipzig Hbf
Preceding station	Abellio Rail Mitteldeutschland	Following station
Jena-Göschwitz towards Saalfeld (Saale)	RE 15	Jena Saale towards Leipzig Hbf
Jena-Göschwitz towards Saalfeld (Saale)	RB 25	Jena Saale towards Halle (Saale) Hbf
Preceding station		Following station
Jena-Göschwitz Terminus	RB 28	Jena Saale towards Pößneck unt Bf
Location

Jena Paradies station is the main railway station of the city of Jena in the German state of Thuringia. It is on the Saal Railway and is served by two long-distance services each day and regional trains to and from Naumburg, Saalfeld and Pößneck. It is named after and adjacent to Paradies ("paradise") Park, which is on the eastern shore of the Saale river.

== Location ==
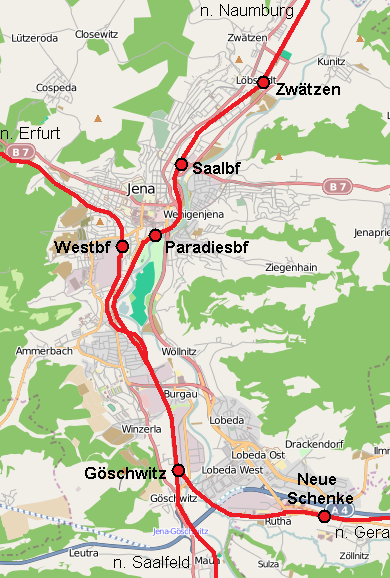
Location of the station in the city

Jena Paradies station is on the southern edge of the city of Jena on a narrow strip of land between the ring road to the west and the Saale river in the east. In front of the station there are two tram stops and the town’s bus station, so that numerous public transport connections exist.

== History ==
Jena Paradies station was opened on 15 October 1880 on the Saale Railway already operating since 30 April 1874. Until 1999, it served as a centrally located stop only for regional transport, long-distance trains on the Saale Railway stopped at Jena Saale station. In September 1996, the Jena City Council chose Jena Paradies as the stop for the new ICE service in preference to the remote northerly location of Jena Saale station. Lack of funds at Deutsche Bahn then led to delays and the construction of a temporary station. Two wooden auxiliary platform were built in 1998/1999 south of the old station for about two million Deutsche Marks. It was opened on 26 September 1999, when the stopping point in Jena for ICE trains on the Berlin–Leipzig–Munich route was transferred there from the Saale station.

On 1 March 2002, construction and financing contracts for the new ICE station was signed between Deutsche Bahn, the state of Thuringia and the city of Jena. The new station was to replace the existing regional station in 2004 at a cost of €16.1 million.

The old station building was abandoned, at the beginning of reconstruction in 2003, as the existing island platform did not have the required 370 m length for ICE operations. The construction of the two new platforms between km 27.0 and 27.4 was carried out next to the existing railway line, with rail services continuing to operate. On 18 June 2005, the new facilities were officially opened. The construction cost was around €21 million.

== Layout ==
The station is classified by Deutsche Bahn as a Haltepunkt (loosely: "halt" or "stop"), as it is not a rail junction and, more specifically, it has no sets of points. It consists of two 370 m-long platforms, with a length of 117 metres under cover on each platform. As it is built on an embankment, there is limited space in the single storey building with rooms for two ticket offices for Deutsche Bahn and a bakery, which sells newspapers and other travel-related products in addition to pastries. The adjacent toilets can be used during opening times. These facilities extend over a length of 63 metres. An underpass was built through the embankment under the stations, creating a link between the park and the city.

Travellers wishing to connect with the Holzland Railway (Erfurt–Weimar–Gera), the second line running through Jena, have to use Jena West station, which is 800 metres away or alternatively change at Jena-Göschwitz station, a few kilometres to the south.

== Importance ==
The station is the only long distance station in Jena, since the abandonment of long distance passenger operations on the Mid-German Connection and its associated stops at Jena West and Jena-Göschwitz, which was the only place in Jena where it was previously possible to transfer between long-distance trains. Jena Paradies station is used on an average day by about 3,500 passengers, second only to Jena West station, which has more commuter traffic.

== Operations ==
In the 2026 timetable, the following services stop at the station:

Line	Route	Frequency	Operator
ICE 18	Munich – Augsburg – Nuremberg – Jena Paradies – Naumburg – Leipzig – Berlin – Berlin Gesundbrunnen	One train pair overnight	DB Fernverkehr
IC 61	Leipzig – Naumburg – Jena Paradies – Saalfeld – Lichtenfels – Nürnberg – Stuttgart – Karlsruhe	2 train pairs	DB Fernverkehr
RE 15	Jena Saalbf – Jena Paradies – Kahla – Rudolstadt – Saalfeld	120	Abellio
RB 25	Halle – Merseburg – Weißenfels – Naumburg – Camburg – Jena Paradies – Orlamünde – Saalfeld	60	Abellio
RB 28	Jena Saalbf – Jena Paradies – Rothenstein – Orlamünde – Pößneck	120	Erfurter Bahn

Prior to the completion of the Nuremberg–Erfurt high-speed line in 2017, Jena was served by ICE services between Berlin and Munich.

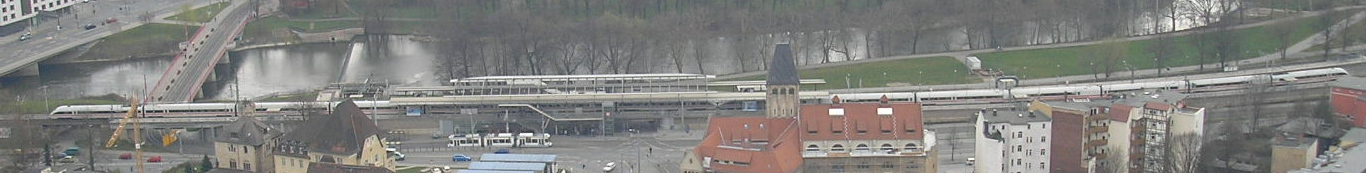
Double-length Intercity Express at Jena Paradies station makes clear the relative sizes (the entrance building is in the second quarter of the picture from the left)

== See also ==
- List of railway stations in Thuringia
- Rail transport in Germany
