= Mid-Germany Railway =

Rail link between Thuringia and Saxony

The Mid-Germany Railway (German: Mitte-Deutschland-Verbindung) is a rail link between German states of Thuringia and Saxony. The central element of this link connects Chemnitz and Glauchau in the east via Gera and Jena to Weimar in the west. It includes the Dresden–Werdau line (between Chemnitz and Glauchau), the Glauchau–Gößnitz line, the Gera–Gößnitz line and the Weimar–Gera line.

It is part of a possible direct rail connection from the Ruhr and Frankfurt am Main via Eisenach, Erfurt, Weimar, Jena West, Jena-Göschwitz, Gera, Gößnitz, Werdau, Zwickau, Chemnitz as far as Dresden and offers an alternative route to the route currently used by long-distance traffic from Erfurt to Dresden via Leipzig.

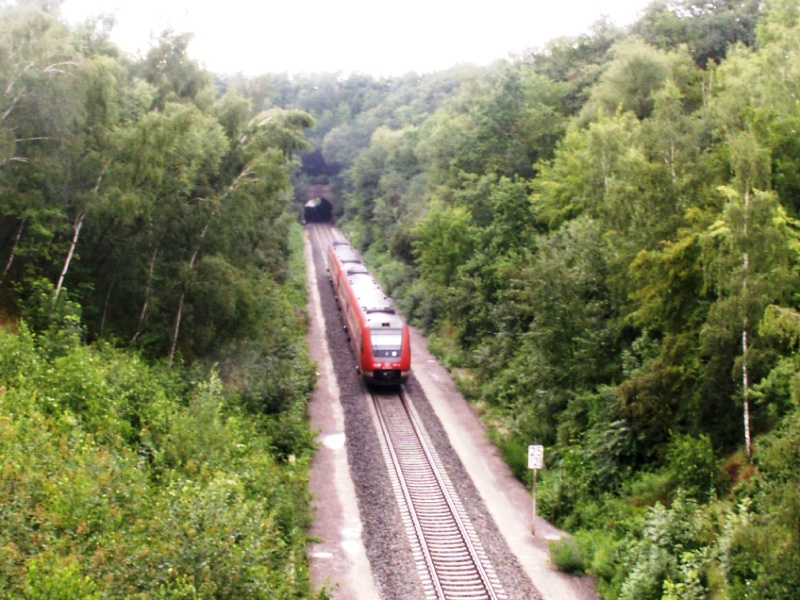
Mid-German Connection near Ronneburg

== History ==
Before the division of Germany the Mid-German Railway was an important link between the industrial areas of Saxony and western Germany. It also formed an important connection with the Elster Valley Railway between Bohemia and western Germany.

During the time of East Germany, the line provided relief for the important lines running from Halle and Leipzig. In the euphoria immediately after German reunification, an extension of this route was planned, since it was now classified as an important link between western Saxony (Chemnitz) and western Germany. The connection was not actually listed under the legislation for the German Unity Transport Projects, but it was listed as a "priority" in the Federal Transport Infrastructure Plan of 1993. Priority was subsequently given, however, to the line via Leipzig. Nevertheless, InterRegio line 41 was established on the line providing a fast modern long-distance link. It offered a transfer-free connection between Chemnitz and Aachen at four-hour intervals. Because of the lack of overhead contact wire between Gößnitz and Weimar, locomotive changes have been necessary in Weimar since 1995. Until May 1995, diesel locomotives ran from Erfurt to Bebra, as the electrification of the Neudietendorf–Bebra section of the Thuringian Railway was still not complete. The diesel power was provided by class 219 and 232 locomotives.

The initial euphoria over reunification era soon gave way to disillusion, as there was no money to for the project. For Gera, the second largest city in Thuringia, the upgrade was a matter of prestige, as it was the largest city in Germany without a double-track rail connection. This was followed by political disputes, and the benefit-cost ratio of the Nuremberg–Erfurt high-speed railway was also questioned.

Despite an agreement between Deutsche Bahn and the state of Thuringia of 15 May 1997 for the partial double-tracking of the line and upgrading of the line for tilting trains, a decision had already been taken that year to discontinue long-distance services on the line. The reason was a decision of Deutsche Bahn to abandon InterRegio traffic nationwide. In 1999, two years before the closing of long-distance passenger services in 2001, scheduled freight traffic was closed between Gera and Weimar on the Mid-German Connection.

=== Further upgrade ===
The first stage consists of upgrading the line to allow tilting trains to run at 140 km / h and the installation of electronic interlocking. Work was completed as follows: 2002, Weimar–Jena–Göschwitz; approximately 2006/07, Göschwitz–Gera–Ronneburg; approximately 2007/08, Ronneburg–Glauchau. According to the Federal Government, the completion of construction of the first stage is scheduled for 2012 (as of November 2008).

The second stage involves the extension of duplication for 160 km / h for tilting trains and the electrification of the line. This is classified as an "additional requirement" and was not included in the five-year plan (2006 to 2010). The single-track sections between Weimar and Großschwabhausen and between Neue Schenke and Stadtroda are due to be duplicated by 2014. The expansion plans and further prospects continue to be debated and are highly politicised.

== Operations ==
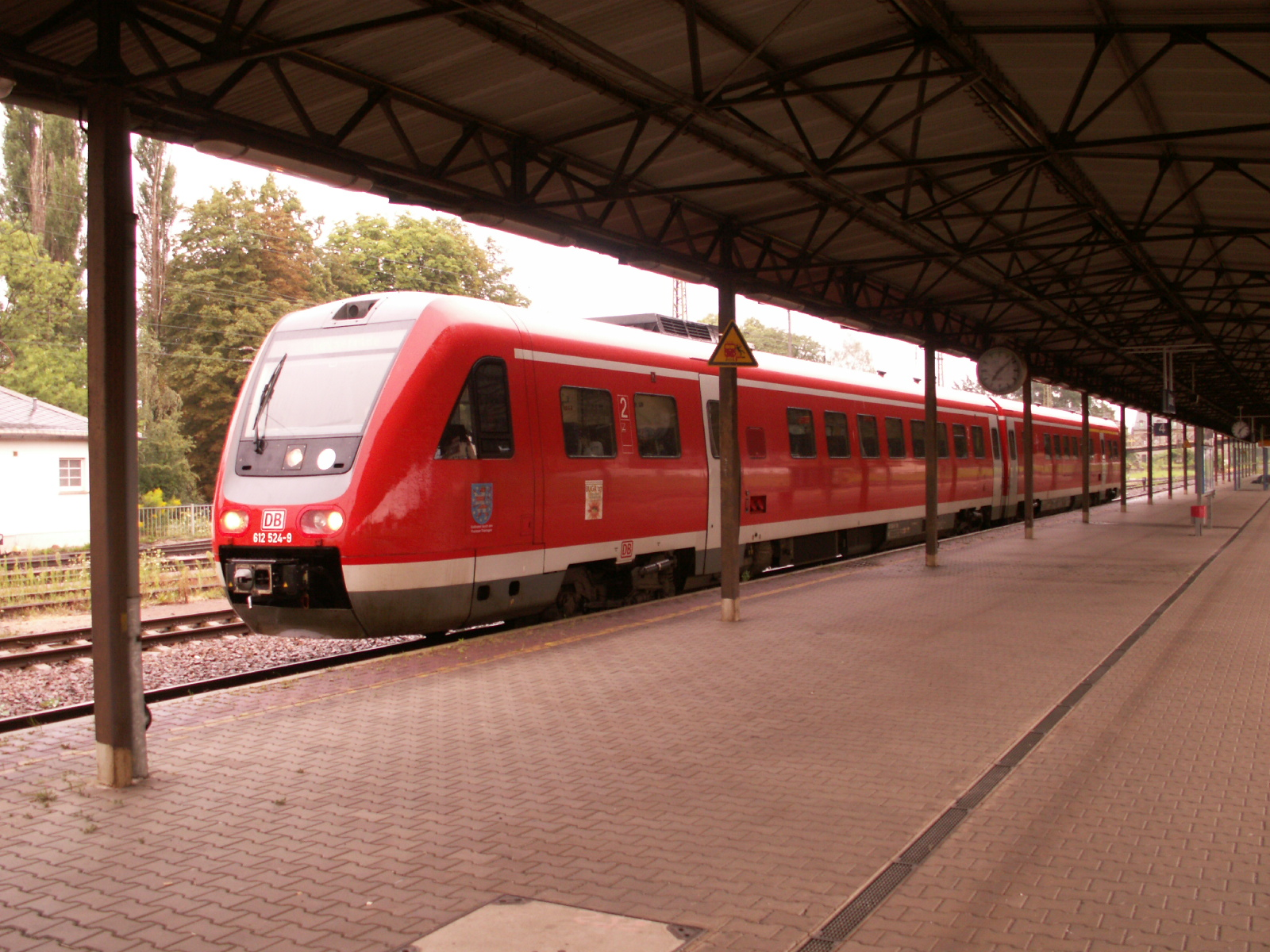
Regional-Express service from Göttingen to Zwickau in Gößnitz station

Since 2000, the former long-distance services have been replaced by Regional-Express services, using class 612 diesel multiple units, running every two hours. All trains that travel over the whole route operate as railcars with three sets combined from Göttingen via Gotha (where trains reverse) and Erfurt to Gößnitz, where the train is broken into its three sets. One set continues to Chemnitz and another to Zwickau. The third set runs back to Gera and sometimes to Gotha. Services between Glauchau and Weimar are scheduled to take about two hours.

Regionalbahn service use class 642 diesel multiple units. Many passengers use the service, especially students of the Friedrich Schiller University of Jena, who commute each day between the university and their homes. In addition Regionalbahn services run between Erfurt, Weimar, Jena and Gera, resulting in services at 30 to 40 minute intervals as far as Gera.

A problem for long-distance connections is that Intercity-Express (ICE) services on the Munich–Nuremberg–Berlin route on the Saal Railway through the Saale valley do not stop at Jena-Göschwitz station (ICE trains stop instead at Jena Paradies), which prevents a direct transfer to services on the Mid-Germany Railway running to Chemnitz via Gera and Zwickau and to Erfurt via Weimar.
