= Gößnitz–Gera railway =

Railway line in Germany

Overview
- Line number: 6268
- Locale: Thuringia, Germany
- Termini: Gößnitz; Gera Süd

Service
- Route number: 540

Technical
- Line length: 35.042 km (21.774 mi)
- Track gauge: 1,435 mm (4 ft 8 1/2 in) standard gauge
- Minimum radius: 265 m (869 ft)
- Maximum incline: 1.2%

The Gößnitz–Gera railway is a single-track main line in the German state of Thuringia, which was originally built and operated by the Gößnitz-Gera Railway Company. The route is an important section of a long-distance line connecting the west Saxon industrial district and western Germany (the Mid-German Connection). It runs from Gößnitz on the Leipzig–Hof line via Ronneburg to Gera.

== History ==
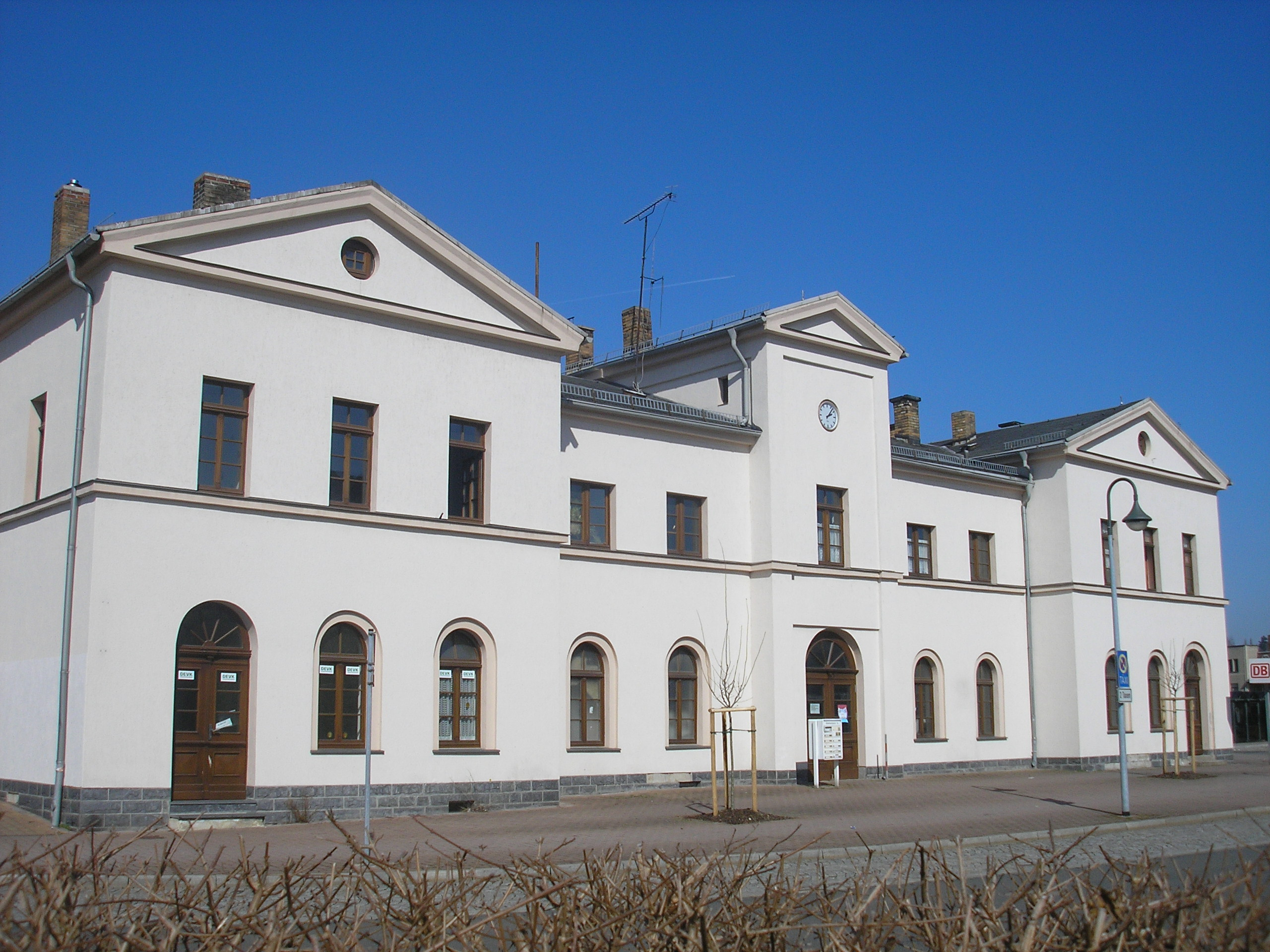
Schmölln station

The railway line was opened on 28 December 1865 by the Gößnitz-Gera Railway Company (German: Gößnitz-Geraer Eisenbahn-Gesellschaft) to connect the rising industrial centre of Gera (which then had about 16,000 inhabitants) to the West Saxon industrial district. The opening of the line also caused an economic boom in the towns of Schmölln and Ronneburg. On 1 January 1878 operation of the line was taken over by the Royal Saxon State Railways.

The extension of the Lichtenberg open pit mine uranium mining in the Ronneburg district led to the line being rebuilt further north through the Gessen valley in 1968. The deviation consisted of an embankment built with spoil from the mine and a 196-metre-long tunnel, which allows single-track operation only. The deviation extended the line by about 480 m. The chainages from Ronneburg west were altered as follows:

- Gera-Kaimberg (now Gera-Gessental): from 28.57 km to 29.05 km
- Gera Süd: from 33.00 km 33.48 km.

The chainage from Gößnitz is not marked between Gera Süd and Gera Hauptbahnhof (central station) because the two-track line that ran parallel to the similarly two-track Prussian line (the Leipzig–Probstzella line) was dismantled after 1945 for war reparations to the Soviet Union.

The embankment built during the relocation of the line through the Gessen valley was removed before the 2007 Federal Garden Show and replaced by a steel arch bridge.

Today, every two hours, the line is served by Regional-Express 1 services on the Göttingen–Erfurt–Weimar–Jena–Gera–Gößnitz–Zwickau/Chemnitz route. It runs on the Mid-German Connection (Mitte-Deutschland-Verbindung) and is divided into two sections at Gößnitz. Part of the train continues via Glauchau to Chemnitz and the other part runs via Werdau to Zwickau. In the opposite direction trains are combined at Gößnitz. In addition a Regional-Express from Weimar to Glauchau operates on the line on weekends at two hourly intervals. Regionalbahn services were discontinued at the December 2008 timetable change. Since then local services between Gera and Altenburg are provided by an extension of the Regional-Express services on the Erfurt–Gera–Altenburg route (which previously terminated in Gera).

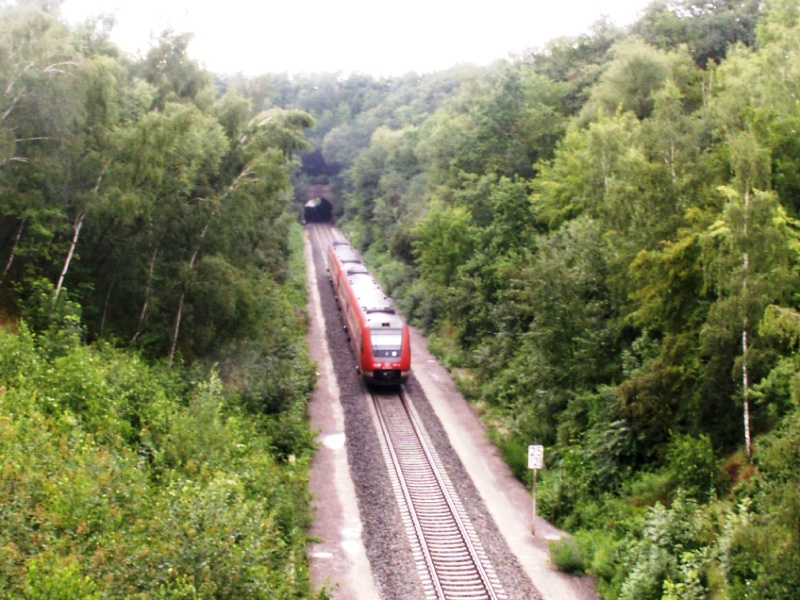
Regional-Express near Ronneburg

The Federal Transport Infrastructure Plan mentions upgrading the line as an "additional requirement". The current plan provides for electrification and the upgrading of the line to two-tracks as part of the duplication of the entire between Weimar and Glauchau and closing the gap in the electrification between Weimar and Gößnitz. The review of the Infrastructure Plan in November 2010 recommends the dropping of the duplication and recommends only electrification of the line, as long-distance passenger traffic of this relation is not considered economic, and thus the second track is unnecessary. As a result, the overall project would now have an estimated benefit/cost ratio of 1.3 to 1.5 instead of the benefit/cost ratio 0.7 for the comprehensive upgrade.
