= Neue Schenke station =

Railway station in Jena, Germany

Neue Schenke
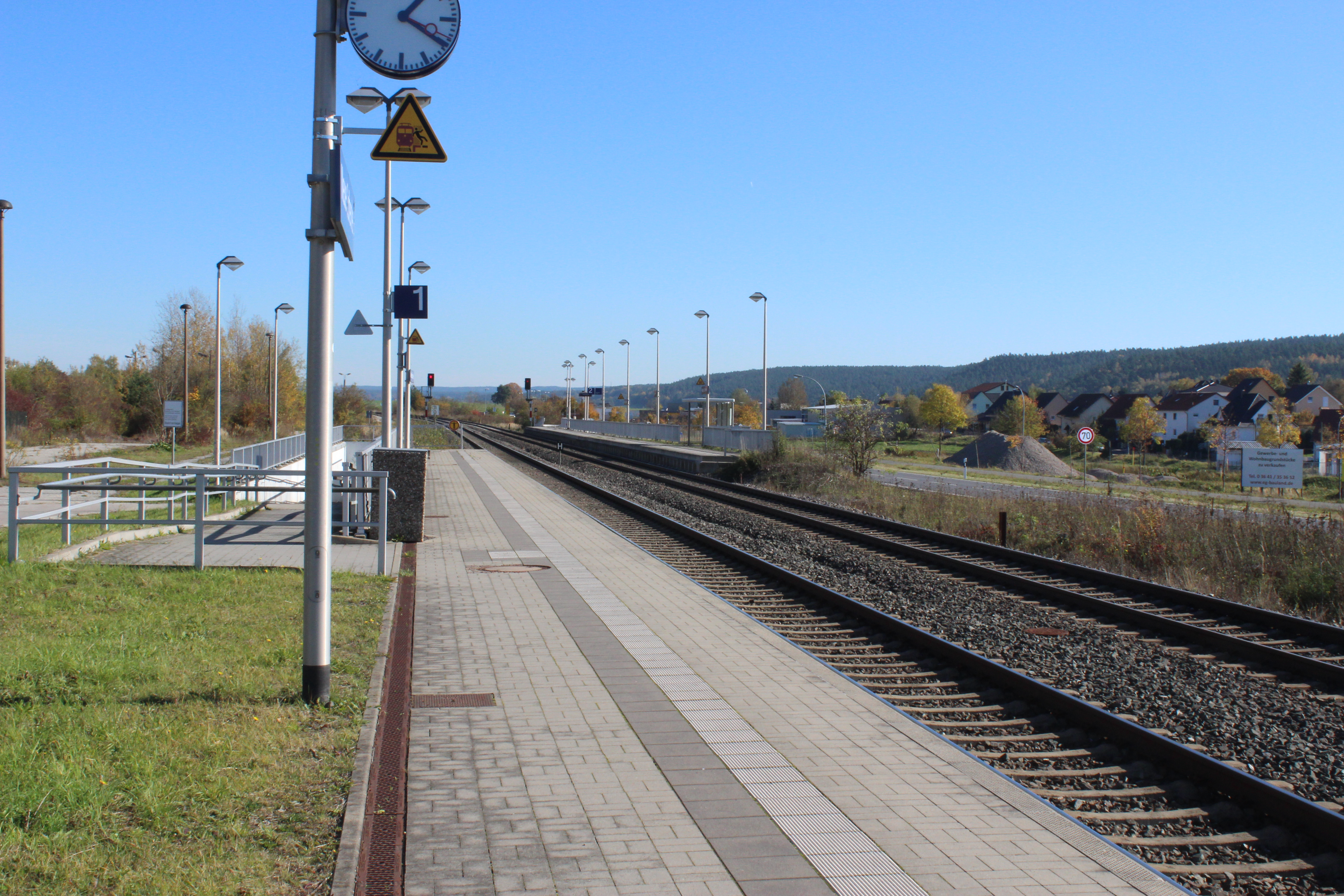
- Train stop platform in 2017

General information
- Location: Neue Schenke, Jena, Thuringia; Germany
- Coordinates: 50°52′32.2″N 11°38′8.9″E
- Line: Weimar–Gera railway
- Distance: 30.9 kilometres (19.2 mi) from Weimar
- Platforms: 2 side platforms
- Tracks: 2
- Train operators: Erfurter Bahn

Other information
- Station code: 4375
- DS100 code: UNS
- IBNR: 8012443
- Category: 7

Services
| Preceding station | | Following station |
|---|---|---|
| Jena-Göschwitz towards Erfurt Hbf | RB 21 | Stadtroda towards Gera Hbf |
Location

Neue Schenke station (German: Bahnhof Neue Schenke is a station on the Weimar–Gera railway (route 6307, current timetable route 565), also known as the "Holzlandbahn" or "Mid-Germany Connection" in Thuringia, Germany.

The stop was once located in the territory of the Zöllnitz municipality, just beyond the Jena city limit, near the Lobeda Ost residential area. Since then, the tracks and buildings have been incorporated into Jena.

== Description ==
The station was initially opened for passenger traffic on a trial basis in 1877. In 1894, a side track was added and on October 15, freight traffic was approved. In the 1920s, a connecting track was built, resulting in a considerable connecting facility between the main track and the highway at the eastern exit in 1971/72. This served to supply building materials to the large companies in this industry in the Jena area and to service other connected companies. Until 1989/90, the station was of great importance for freight and connecting traffic around Jena. During the Reichsbahn era, Neue Schenke was run as an occupied station subordinate to another.

In 1930, Schmalstich, a WWI veteran, leased the Neue Schenke building to serve it as a restaurant.

After German reunification, the connecting facilities were shut down and the rails were removed. In 2005, the station was downgraded to a stop. The building was sold in 2013.

The station has two side platforms, both 55 centimetres (22 in) high and 110 metres (360 ft) long.

In 2013, the train station building was sold to the new owner, and the Autocar market appeared there.

In 2022, Deutsche Bahn has begun planning for the electrification of the Central Germany connection between Weimar and Gößnitz, with initial preparations set for 2026. The train stop platforms will be extended at Neue Schenke station to allow longer trains to stop.

== Connections ==
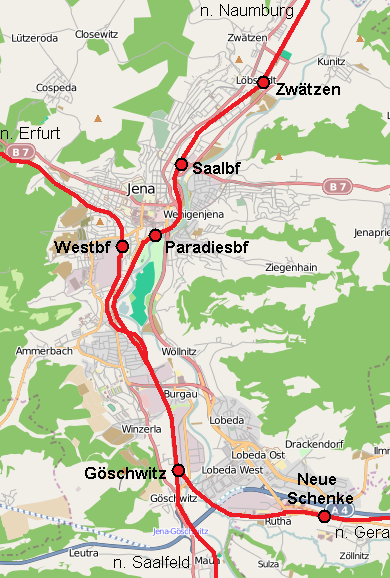
Neue Schenke on the Jena map of train stations

The "Neue Schenke" station is served every two hours by the regional traffic of the RB Line 21 (Weimar - Jena West - Jena-Göschwitz - Neue Schenke - Gera). This regional traffic has been operated by the Erfurt Railway since the timetable change in June 2012, was renamed from RB21 to EB21, and was renamed back with the timetable change on December 13, 2020. The RB21 line runs from Erfurt to Gera with 15 intermediate stops at smaller stations.

Until 2014, there was no notable connection to local public transport, as the station or stop was not originally designed for passenger traffic. A footpath to the nearest public transport lines took 15 minutes. Since the local transport plan of 2014, the 42 bus line serves the stop. Along this route, passengers have three transfer options to the tram network.
