= List of railway routes in Thuringia =

The List of railway routes in Thuringia provides a list of all railway routes in Thuringia. This includes Intercity-Express, Intercity, Regional-Express, Regionalbahn services. In the route tables, the major stations are shown in bold text. Where intermediate stations are not given, these are replaced by three dots "...".

== Regional services ==
The following Regional-Express and Regionalbahn services run through Thuringia:

Line	Route		KBS	Frequency	Material	Operator
RE 1	Göttingen – Heiligenstadt – Leinefelde – Mühlhausen – Großengottern – Bad Langensalza – Gotha – Neudietendorf – Erfurt – Weimar – Jena West – Jena-Göschwitz – Stadtroda – Hermsdorf-Klosterlausnitz – Gera – Gera Süd – Ronneburg – Schmölln – Gößnitz – Meerane – Glauchau		540, 540.1, 565, 600, 604, 605	120 min	Class 612	DB Regio Südost
RE 2	Kassel-Wilhelmshöhe – Fuldatal-Ihringshausen – Speele – Hann Münden – Hedemünden – Gertenbach – Witzenhausen Nord – Eichenberg – Arenshausen – Uder – Heiligenstadt – Leinefelde – Silberhausen – Dachrieden – Mühlhausen – Großengottern – Bad Langensalza – Döllstädt – Erfurt		600, 603, 604	120 min	Siemens Desiro Classic (classic 642); Siemens Desiro A TER (class 641), some trains	DB Regio Südost
RE 3	Erfurt – Weimar – Jena West – Jena-Göschwitz – Stadtroda – Hermsdorf-Klosterlausnitz – Gera (split/joined) – Gera Süd	– Gera-Zwötzen – Wünschendorf – Berga – Neumühle – Greiz	540; 541; 565	120 min	Class 612	DB Regio Südost
RE 3	Erfurt – Weimar – Jena West – Jena-Göschwitz – Stadtroda – Hermsdorf-Klosterlausnitz – Gera (split/joined) – Gera Süd	– Ronneburg – Nöbdenitz – Schmölln – Lehndorf – Altenburg	540; 541; 565	120 min	Class 612	DB Regio Südost
**RE 3V**	Erfurt Hbf – Weimar – Jena West – Jena-Göschwitz		565	Some trains	Class 612	DB Regio Südost
RE 7	Erfurt – Neudietendorf – Arnstadt – Plaue – (Gräfenroda –) Zella-Mehlis – Suhl – (Rohr –) Grimmenthal – (Rentwertshausen –) Mellrichstadt Bahnhof – Bad Neustadt (Saale) – (Burglauer –) Münnerstadt – (Rottershausen –) Ebenhausen – (Poppenhausen – Oberwerrn –) Schweinfurt – Würzburg		570; 815	120 min	Class 612	DB Regio Südost
RE 8	Leinefelde – Sollstedt – Bleicherode Ost – Wolkramshausen – Nordhausen – Berga-Kelbra – Sangerhausen – Wolferode – Eisleben – Röblingen am See – Halle		600; 590	120 min	Bombardier Talent 2 (class 9442, three parts)	Abellio Rail Mitteldeutschland
RE 9	Kassel-Wilhelmshöhe – Hann Münden – Witzenhausen Nord – Eichenberg – Heiligenstadt – Leinefelde – Bleicherode Ost – Wolkramshausen – Nordhausen – Heringen – Görsbach – Berga-Kelbra – Roßla – Bennungen – Wallhausen – Sangerhausen – Blankenheim – Wolferode – Eisleben – Röblingen am See – Halle		590; 600; 611	120 min	Bombardier Talent 2	Abellio Rail Mitteldeutschland
RE 10	Magdeburg – Magdeburg-Buckau – Schönebeck (Elbe) – Schönebeck-Bad Salzelmen – Eggersdorf – Eickendorf – Förderstedt – Staßfurt – Neundorf (Anh) – Güsten – Sandersleben – Hettstedt – Klostermansfeld – Sangerhausen – Oberröblingen – Voigtstedt – Artern – Reinsdorf (Artern) – Bretleben – Heldrungen – Etzleben – Griefstedt – Leubingen – Sömmerda – Großrudestedt – Stotternheim – Erfurt Ost – Erfurt		595; 335; 590; 330; 340	120 min	Alstom Coradia LINT (class 648)	Abellio Rail Mitteldeutschland
RE 12	Leipzig – Leipzig-Plagwitz – Leipzig-Knauthain – Groß Dalzig – Pegau – Profen – Zeitz – Wetterzeube – Crossen Ort – Bad Köstritz – Gera-Langenberg – Gera – Gera-Süd – Gera-Zwötzen – Weida – Niederpöllnitz – Triptis – Neustadt – Pößneck oberer Bahnhof – Saalfeld		550; 555	120 min	Stadler Regio-Shuttle RS1 (class 650)	Erfurter Bahn
RE 15	Jena Saalbahnhof – Jena Paradies – Jena-Göschwitz – Kahla – Rudolstadt – Rudolstadt-Schwarza – Saalfeld		590	120 min	Bombardier Talent 2	Abellio Rail Mitteldeutschland
RE 16	Erfurt – Weimar – Apolda – Großheringen – Bad Kösen – Naumburg – Weißenfels – Merseburg – Halle		580	120 min	Bombardier Talent 2	Abellio Rail Mitteldeutschland
RE 17	Erfurt – Weimar – Apolda – Bad Sulza – Bad Kösen – Naumburg		580	120 min	Bombardier Talent 2	Abellio Rail Mitteldeutschland
**RE 21**	Erfurt – Vieselbach – Weimar – Oberweimar – Mellingen – Großschwabhausen – Jena West – Jena-Göschwitz – Neue Schenke – Stadtroda – Papiermühle – Hermsdorf-Klosterlausnitz – Kraftsdorf – Töppeln – Gera		565	1 trip in the evening	Stadler Regio-Shuttle RS1	Erfurter Bahn
RE 42	Leipzig – Weißenfels – Naumburg – Camburg – Jena Paradies – Jena-Göschwitz – Kahla – Rudolstadt – Rudolstadt-Schwarza – Saalfeld – Breternitz – Kaulsdorf – Unterloquitz – Probstzella – Ludwigsstadt – Steinbach am Wald – Förtschendorf – Pressig-Rothenkirchen – Stockheim – Gundelsdorf – Kronach – Neuses (b Kronach) – Küps – Redwitz – Hochstadt-Marktzeuln – Michelau – Lichtenfels – Bad Staffelstein – Ebensfeld – Zapfendorf – Breitengüßbach – Bamberg – Hirschaid – Forchheim – Erlangen – Fürth – Nuremberg		582; 580; 560; 840; 841; 820	120 min	Bombardier Talent 2	DB Regio Bayern
RE 45	Erfurt Hauptbahnhof – Neudietendorf – Arnstadt – Arnstadt Süd – Ilmenau Pörlitzer Höhe – Ilmenau		566	Individual services	Stadler Regio-Shuttle RS1	Süd-Thüringen-Bahn
RE 50	Erfurt – Neudietendorf – Arnstadt – Arnstadt Süd – Plaue – Gräfenroda – Zella-Mehlis – Suhl – Grimmenthal – Meiningen		570	2 train pairs	Stadler Regio-Shuttle RS1	Süd-Thüringen-Bahn
RE 50	Erfurt Hbf – Neudietendorf – Arnstadt – Plaue – Gräfenroda – Zella-Mehlis – Zella-Mehlis West – Benshausen – Viernau – Steinbach-Hallenberg – Altersbach – Schmalkalden-Fachhochschule – Schmalkalden – Auehütte – Mittelschmalkalden – Niederschmalkalden – Wernshausen		570; 573	3 train pairs	Stadler Regio-Shuttle RS1	Süd-Thüringen-Bahn
IC 51; **RE 51**	Erfurt – Weimar – Jena West – Jena-Göschwitz – Stadtroda – Hermsdorf-Klosterlausnitz – Gera		580; 565	3 train pairs (local tickets usable on IC train on this section)		DB Fernverkehr
RE 55	Nordhausen - Wolkramshausen - Kleinfurra - Großfurra - Glückauf - Sondershausen - Hohenebra Ort - Niederspier - Wasserthaleben - Greußen - Gangloffsömmern - Straußfurt - Ringleben-Gebesee - Walschleben - Kühnhausen - Erfurt-Gispersleben – Erfurt Nord – Erfurt		601	120 min, RE 55 and RE 56 provide hourly service in combination	Siemens Desiro Classic	DB Regio Südost
RE 56	Nordhausen - Werther - Wolkramshausen - Kleinfurra - Großfurra - Glückauf - Sondershausen - Hohenebra Ort - Niederspier - Wasserthaleben - Greußen - Gangloffsömmern - Straußfurt - Ringleben-Gebesee - Walschleben - Kühnhausen - Erfurt-Gispersleben - Erfurt Nord - Erfurt		601	120 min, RE 55 and RE 56 provide hourly service in combination	Siemens Desiro Classic	DB Regio Südost
RB 4	Gera - Gera Süd - Gera-Zwötzen - Wünschendorf Nord - Wünschendorf - Berga - Neumühle - Greiz - Greiz-Dölau - Elsterberg - Elsterberg-Kunstseidenwerk - Rentzschmühle - Barthmühle - Plauen Mitte - Kürbitz - Weischlitz		541	120 min	Stadler Regio-Shuttle RS1	Vogtlandbahn
RB 6	**Bebra** - Ronshausen - Wildeck-Hönebach - Wildeck-Bosserode - Wildeck-Obersuhl - Gerstungen - Herleshausen Hp - Hörschel Hp - Eisenach Opelwerke Hp - Eisenach West - **Eisenach**		605	60 (Mon–Fri) 120 (Sat+Sun)	Flirt	Cantus Verkehrsgesellschaft
RB 13	Leipzig – Leipzig-Plagwitz – Leipzig-Knauthain – Zwenkau-Großdalzig – Pegau – Profen – Zeitz – Wetterzeube – Crossen Ort – Bad Köstritz – Gera-Langenberg – Gera – Gera Süd – Gera-Zwötzen – Weida – Weida Mitte – Weida Altstadt – Loitsch-Hohenleuben – Triebes – Zeulenroda unt Bf – Mehltheuer – Schönberg – Feilitzsch – Hof		820, 840	546	Stadler Regio-Shuttle RS1	Erfurter Bahn
RB 20	Leipzig Hauptbahnhof – Leipzig-Möckern – Leipzig-Leutzsch – Leipzig-Rückmarsdorf – Leipzig-Miltitz – Markranstädt – Großlehna – Kötzschau – Bad Dürrenberg – Großkorbetha – Weißenfels – Leißling – Naumburg (Saale) Hauptbahnhof – Bad Kösen – Großheringen – Bad Sulza – Niedertrebra – Apolda – Oßmannstedt – Weimar – Hopfgarten – Vieselbach – Erfurt Hauptbahnhof – Erfurt-Bischleben – Neudietendorf – Wandersleben – Seebergen – Gotha – Fröttstädt – Mechterstädt – Sättelstädt – Schönau – Wutha – Eisenach		582; 581	60 min	Bombardier Talent 2	Abellio Rail Mitteldeutschland
RB 21	Erfurt – Vieselbach – Weimar – Oberweimar – Mellingen – Großschwabhausen – Jena West – Jena-Göschwitz – Neue Schenke – Stadtroda – Papiermühle – Hermsdorf-Klosterlausnitz – Kraftsdorf – Töppeln – Gera		565	120 min	Stadler Regio-Shuttle RS1	Erfurter Bahn
RB 22	Leipzig – Leipzig-Plagwitz – Leipzig-Knauthain – Groß Dalzig – Pegau – Profen – Zeitz – Crossen Ort – Crossen an der Elster – Bad Köstritz – Gera – Gera Süd – Gera-Zwötzen – Wolfsgefärth – Weida – Niederpöllnitz – Triptis – Neustadt (Orla) – Neuenhofen – Oppurg – Pößneck oberer Bahnhof – Krölpa-Ranis – Könitz – Unterwellenborn – Saalfeld		550; 555	120 min	Stadler Regio-Shuttle RS1	Erfurter Bahn
RB 23	Erfurt – Erfurt-Bischleben – Neudietendorf – Sülzenbrücken – Haarhausen – Arnstadt – Marlishausen – Niederwillingen – Stadtilm – Singen – Paulinzella – Rottenbach – Bad Blankenburg – Saalfeld		561	60 min	Stadler Regio-Shuttle RS1	Erfurter Bahn
RB 25	Halle – Halle-Ammendorf – Schkopau – Merseburg – Leuna Werke Nord – Leuna Werke Süd – Großkorbetha – Weißenfels – Leißling – Naumburg – Bad Kösen – Camburg – Dornbur] – Porstendorf – Jena-Zwätzen – Jena Saalbahnhof – Jena Paradies – Jena-Göschwitz – Rothenstein – Kahla – Orlamünde – Zeutsch – Uhlstädt – Rudolstadt – Rudolstadt-Schwarza – Saalfeld		581; 560	60 min	Bombardier Talent 2	Abellio Rail Mitteldeutschland
RB 26	Weimar – Weimar West – Weimar Berkaer Bf – Nohra – Obergrunstedt – Holzdorf – Legefeld – Hetschburg – Bad Berka Zeughausplatz – Bad Berka – München – Tannroda – Kranichfeld		579	60 min	Stadler Regio-Shuttle RS1	Erfurter Bahn
RB 27	Sömmerda – Kiebitzhöhe – Kölleda – Großneuhausen – Olbersleben-Ellersleben – Guthmannshausen – Buttstädt		594	120 min	Stadler Regio-Shuttle RS1	Erfurter Bahn
RB 28	Jena Saalbahnhof – Jena Paradies – Jena-Göschwitz – Rothenstein – Kahla – Orlamünde – Freienorla – Langenorla West – Langenorla Ost – Pößneck unt Bf		559	120 min	Stadler Regio-Shuttle RS1	Erfurter Bahn
RB 32	Saalfeld – Breternitz – Kaulsdorf – Hockeroda – Leutenberg – Lichtentanne – Wurzbach – Unterlemnitz – Bad Lobenstein – Harra Nord – Harra – Blankenstein		557	120 min	Stadler Regio-Shuttle RS1	Erfurter Bahn
RB 40	Meiningen – Ritschenhausen – Wölfershausen – Bibra – Rentwertshausen – Mellrichstadt Bahnhof – Bad Neustadt – Burglauer – Münnerstadt – Rottershausen – Ebenshausen (Unterfr) – Poppenhausen – Oberwerrn – Schweinfurt		815	120 min	Stadler Regio-Shuttle RS1	Erfurter Bahn
RB 41	Eisenach – Förtha – Marksuhl – Ettenhausen – Oberrohn – Bad Salzungen – Immelborn – Breitungen – Wernshausen – Schwallungen – Wasungen – Walldorf – Meiningen – Untermaßfeld – Grimmenthal – Vachdorf – Themar – Reurieth – Hildburghausen – Veilsdorf – Harras – Eisfeld – Bachfeld – Schalkau – Schalkau Mitte – Rauenstein – Seltendorf – Effelder – Mengersgereuth-Hämmern – Mengersgereuth-Hämmern Ost – Sonneberg (Thür) West – Sonneberg – Sonneberg (Thür) Ost – Sonneberg (Thür) Nord – Hüttengrund – Blechhammer (Thür) – Steinach (Thür) Süd – Steinach (Thür) – Lauscha (Thür) – Oberlauscha – Ernstthal am Rennsteig – Neuhaus-Igelshieb – Neuhaus am Rennweg		564; 569; 575	60/120 min	Stadler Regio-Shuttle RS1	Süd-Thüringen-Bahn
RB 43	Wernshausen – Niederschmalkalden – Mittelschmalkalden – Auehütte – Schmalkalden –Schmalkalden-Fachhochschule – Altersbach – Steinbach-Hallenberg – Viernau – Benshausen –Zella-Mehlis West – Zella-Mehlis – Suhl		573	60 min	Stadler Regio-Shuttle RS1	Süd-Thüringen-Bahn
RB 44	Erfurt – Neudietendorf – Arnstadt – Arnstadt Süd – Plaue – Gräfenroda – Dörrberg – Gehlberg – Zella-Mehlis – Suhl – Suhl-Heinrichs – Dietzhausen – Rohr – Grimmenthal – Untermaßfeld – Meiningen		570	120 min	Stadler Regio-Shuttle RS1	Süd-Thüringen-Bahn
RB 46	Erfurt – Neudietendorf – Sülzenbrücken – Haarhausen – Arnstadt – Arnstadt Süd – Plaue – Martinroda – Geraberg – Elgersburg – Ilmenau-Roda – Ilmenau Pörlitzer Höhe – Ilmenau – Ilmenau Bad – Manebach – Stützerbach – Rennsteig		566	60 min	Stadler Regio-Shuttle RS1	Süd-Thüringen-Bahn
RB 48	Fröttstädt - Hörselgau - Waltershausen - Waltershausen Schnepfenthal - Reinhardsbrunn-Friedrichroda - Friedrichroda		606	60 min	Stadler Regio-Shuttle RS1	Süd-Thüringen-Bahn
RB 52	Leinefelde - Birkungen - Silberhausen - Dachrieden - Ammern - Mühlhausen - Seebach - Großengottern - Schönstedt - Bad Langensalza - Gräfentonna - Döllstädt - Dachwig - Elxleben - Kühnhausen - Erfurt-Gispersleben – Erfurt Nord – Erfurt		600; 603; 604	120 min	Siemens Desiro Classic	DB Regio Südost
RB 53	Bad Langensalza – Eckartsleben – Ballstädt – Bufleben – Gotha Ost – Gotha		604	120 min	Alstom Coradia A TER / Siemens Desiro Classic	DB Regio Südost
RB 57	Heiligenstadt – Leinefelde – Bleicherode Ost – Nordhausen – Berga-Kelbra – Sangerhausen		600	120 min	Bombardier Talent 2	Abellio Rail Mitteldeutschland
RB 59	Erfurt – Erfurt Ost – Stotternheim – Großrudestedt – Sömmerda – Leubingen – Griefstedt – Etzleben – Heldrungen – Bretleben – Reinsdorf – Artern – Sangerhausen		595; 335	120 min	Bombardier Talent 2	Abellio Rail Mitteldeutschland
RB 60	Rottenbach - Bechstedt-Trippstein - Schwarzburg - Sitzendorf-Unterweißbach - Obstfelderschmiede - Mellenbach-Glasbach - Meuselbach-Schwarzmühle - Katzhütte		562	60 min	Alstom Coradia A TER	Oberweissbacher Berg- und Schwarzatalbahn
RB 61	Obstfelderschmiede – Lichtenhain (a d Bergbahn) – Oberweißbach-Deesbach – Cursdorf		563	30 min	class 479.2	Oberweissbacher Berg- und Schwarzatalbahn
RB 80	Göttingen – Nörten-Hardenberg – Northeim – Katlenburg – Wulften – Hattorf – Herzberg – Bad Lauterberg im Harz Barbis – Bad Sachsa – Walkenried – Ellrich – Woffleben – Niedersachswerfen – Nordhausen-Salza – Nordhausen		350; 357	120 min	Alstom Coradia LINT	DB Regio Nord
RB 81	Bodenfelde – Uslar – Volpriehausen – Hardegsen – Northeim – Katlenburg – Wulften – Hattorf – Herzberg – Bad Lauterberg im Harz – Barbis – Bad Sachsa – Walkenried – Ellrich – Woffleben – Niedersachswerfen – Nordhausen-Salza – Nordhausen		356.2; 357	120 min	Alstom Coradia LINT	DB Regio Nord
