= Jena West station =

Railway station in Jena, Germany

Jena West
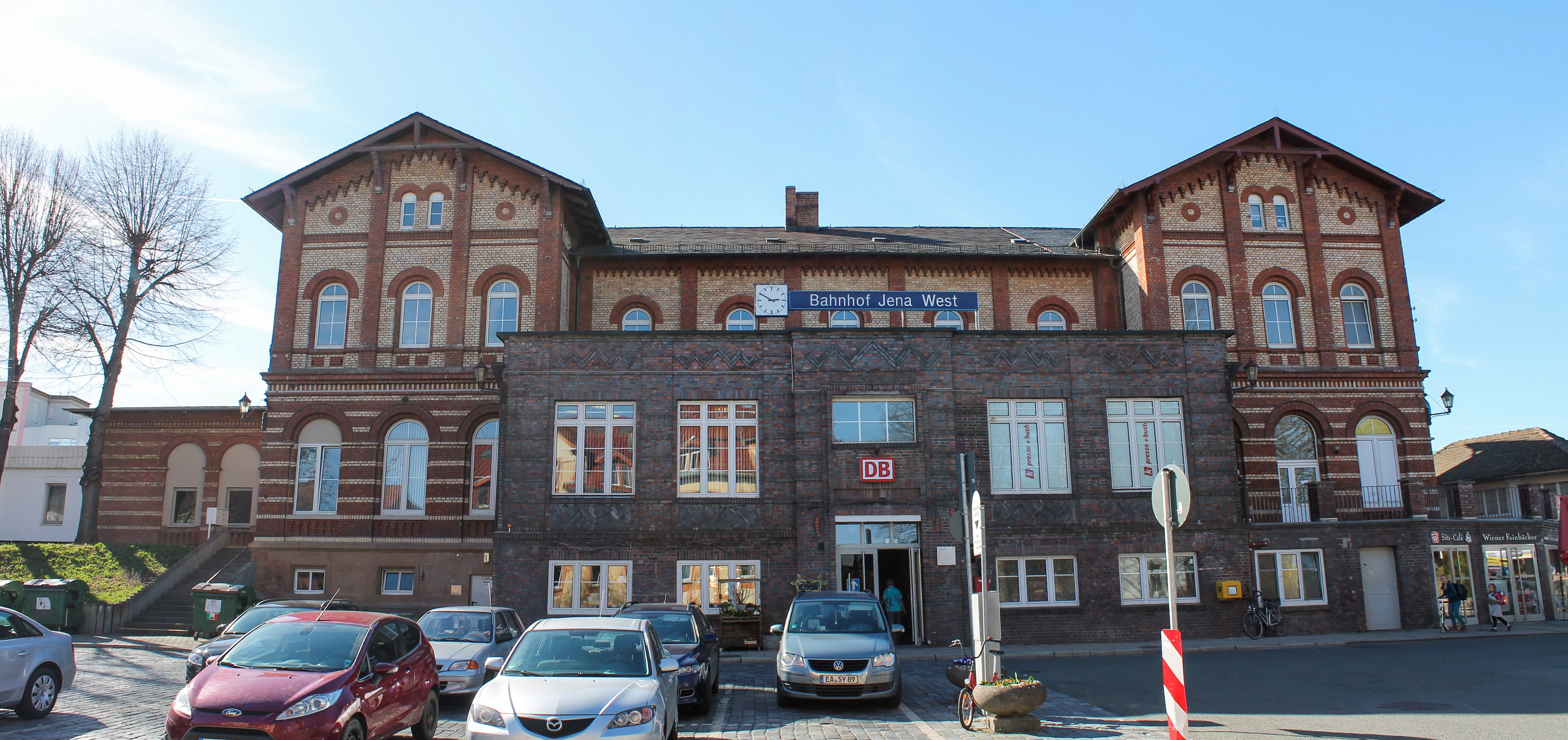

General information
- Location: Jena, Thuringia; Germany
- Coordinates: 50°55′23″N 11°34′41″E
- Owner: Deutsche Bahn
- Operator: DB Netz; DB Station&Service
- Line: Weimar–Gera (KBS 565)
- Platforms: 2

Construction
- Accessible: Yes

Other information
- Station code: 3045
- DS100 code: UJW
- IBNR: 8011957
- Category: 3
- Fare zone: VMT
- Website: www.bahnhof.de

History
- Opened: 29 June 1876; 150 years ago
- Former names: 1876-30 June 1924 Weimar-Geraer Bahnhof

Passengers
- 5,000 per day

Services
Preceding station	DB Fernverkehr	Following station
Weimar towards Köln Hbf	IC 51	Jena-Göschwitz towards Gera Hbf
Preceding station	DB Regio Südost	Following station
Weimar towards Göttingen	RE 1	Jena-Göschwitz towards Glauchau (Sachs)
Weimar towards Erfurt Hbf	RE 3	Jena-Göschwitz towards Altenburg or Greiz
Preceding station		Following station
Großschwabhausen towards Erfurt Hbf	RB 21	Jena-Göschwitz towards Gera Hbf
Location
- Location within Thuringia Location within Germany Location within Europe

Jena West station is to the west of the centre of the city of Jena in the German state of Thuringia at the 22.59 km mark (from Weimar station) of the Weimar–Gera railway between Weimar, Jena-Göschwitz station and Gera Hauptbahnhof. This line is also called the Holzland Railway and it is part of the Mid-German Connection. The station is located in the suburb of Jena-Süd.

The station is 171.64 metres above sea level and was opened on 29 June 1876 simultaneously with the railway. It is classified by Deutsche Bahn as a category 3 station.

== History ==
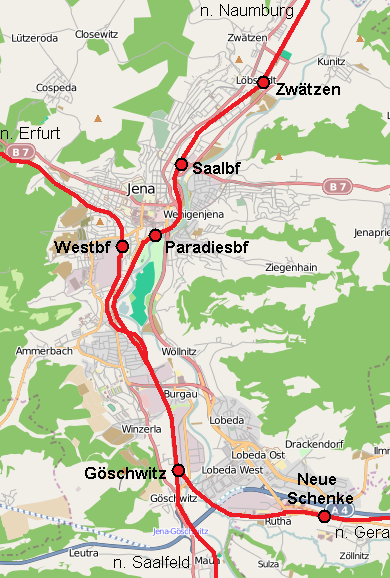
Location of the station in the urban area

The original station building was opened with the line in 1876, but the building in its current form was built in 1878 by the Weimar-Gera Railway Company (Weimar-Geraer Eisenbahn-Gesellschaft), apart from two changes described below. In 1908, the open staircase in the middle of the building was replaced by a new central building. In 1981, the supervisory building was added on the platform side of the reception building. The station building was renovated in 2000 and attracted some retail outlets (shops selling magazines, flowers and model trains and several snack bars). The deportation of Jews, Sinti and Romani during the Second World War is commemorated by a flower-decked plaque at the track-side entrance of the entrance building. In the second half of 2006 the platforms were repainted, new safety systems were installed and a passage was opened that connects platform track 2 with the Schott glass works.

Since the operation of trains through the difficult terrain between Großschwabhausen and Jena West was difficult, especially in the early years of the Weimar–Gera line, it was necessary to use pusher locomotives to provide assistance. A shed was built at the station with accommodation for two pusher engines. Around 1926 the engine shed was closed down because the power of locomotives had increased significantly. It has since accommodated other activities, including a gymnasium. It is now used as a club and as the home of various cultural activities.

=== Freight facilities ===
In 1878 the first siding was established, which was followed by another one in 1889 and by one to Schott & Gen., now Jena Glass Company (JENAer Glas), in 1894. At first the freight had to be transferred on a narrow-gauge track to the glass works, but it later converted into a standard gauge track. There was also a brewery connection, on which wagons (mostly carrying coal) were moved up to the terminal and were then transferred to a light railway with 600 mm gauge. This connection existed until the 1970s.

== Importance ==
Jena West station is the busiest station on the Weimar–Gera line after Jena-Göschwitz station. It is the busiest of the Jena stations and it is currently used on average by about 5,000 passengers a day, so its ridership is higher than that of Jena Paradies station, which is an Intercity-Express stop on the Saale Railway, but has a comparatively low 3,500 passengers a day. Jena West station is heavily frequented by commuters and students on their way to the neighbouring cities of Erfurt and Weimar, which are about 30 and 15 minutes away respectively.

Nevertheless, in 2001 the station lost its InterRegio services on the Aachen / Düsseldorf–Paderborn–Bebra–Weimar–Jena West–Gera–Chemnitz route, its last long-distance service. It is now served by Regionalbahn and Regional-Express trains at regular intervals, operating on weekdays at intervals of 30 or 60 minutes each way. Freight operations and sidings are now closed and all freight tracks were torn up in 2004.

== Station name ==
The station was called Jena Weimar-Geraer Bahnhof, as distinct from Jena Saalbahnhof (Jena Saale station) on the Saale line, until 30 June 1924, when its name was changed to its current name at the request of the city of Jena.

== Location and connections ==
The Jena Paradies station is situated about 600 metres to the east and the inner city of Jena is located about 800 metres from the station to the north-east. OVO bus route 102 runs between the two stations, as well as PVG Apolda route 280, which runs less regularly.

Three regional routes are operated by DB Regio Southeast. Together these provide a service of two trains per hour in each direction between Weimar and Göschwitz on weekdays.

Line	Route	Frequency	Vehicle class
RE 1	Göttingen–Gotha–Erfurt–Weimar–Jena West–Göschwitz–Gera–Gößnitz–Chemnitz/Zwickau	120 min	RegioSwinger
RE 3	(Erfurt–) Weimar–Jena West–Göschwitz–Gera	120 min	RegioSwinger
RB 21	Weimar–Jena West–Göschwitz–Gera	120 min Mon–Fri additional services every 120 min between Weimar and Göschwitz for part of the day	Siemens Desiro
