= Oberweimar station =

Railway station in Weimar, Germany

Oberweimar
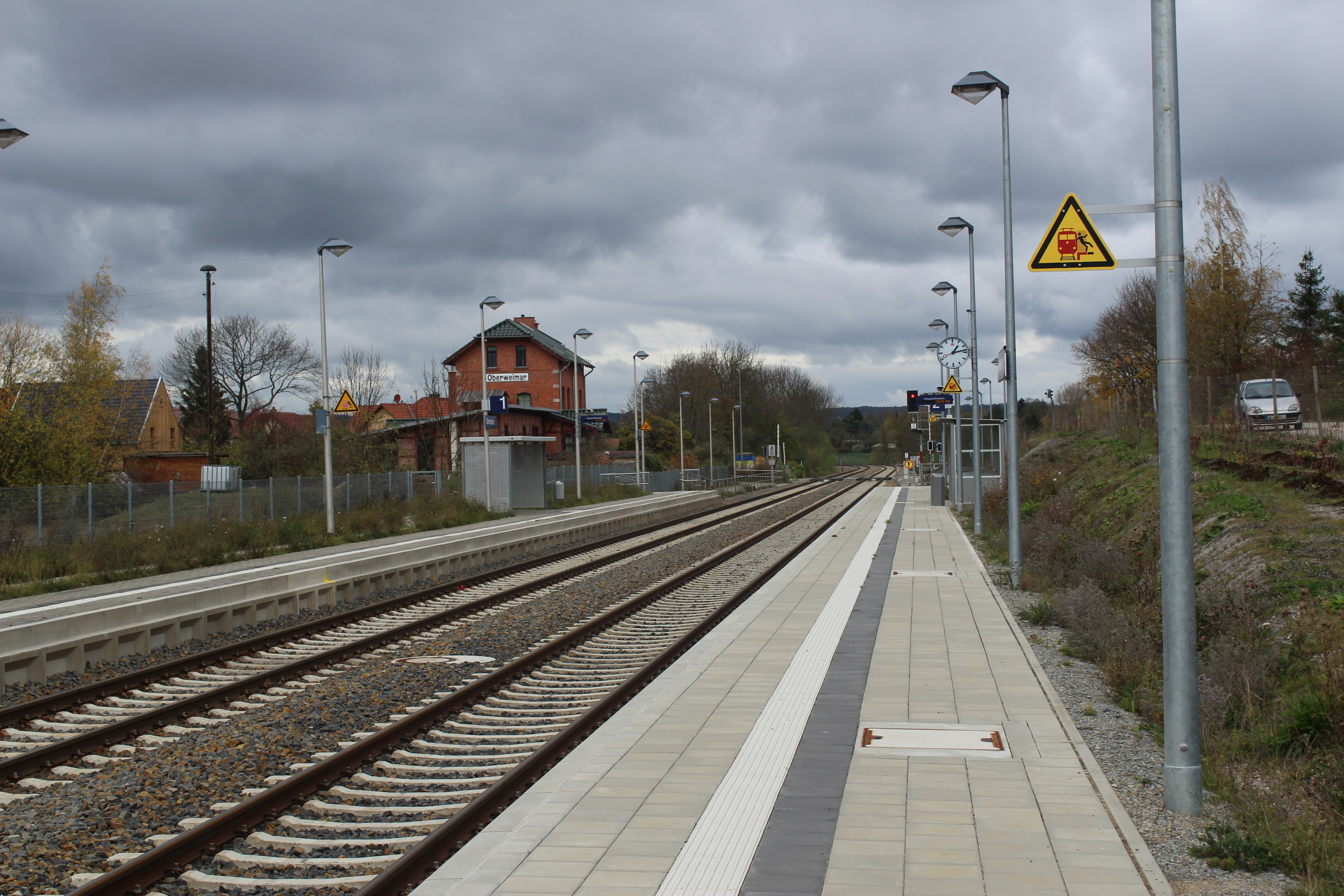
- 2017

General information
- Location: Bahnhofstraße 56; 99425 Weimar; Thuringia, Germany
- Coordinates: 50.9659°N 11.3549°E
- Owner: DB Netz
- Operator: DB Station&Service
- Lines: Weimar–Gera railway (KBS 565)
- Platforms: 2 side platforms
- Tracks: 2
- Train operators: Erfurter Bahn

Other information
- Station code: 4706
- DS100 code: UOB
- IBNR: 8012541
- Category: 7
- Website: www.bahnhof.de

History
- Opened: 1897; 129 years ago

Services
Preceding station		Following station
Weimar towards Erfurt Hbf	RB 21	Mellingen (Thür) towards Gera Hbf
Location
- Location within Thuringia

Oberweimar station is a railway station in the Oberweimar district in the city of Weimar, located in Thuringia, Germany.
