= Jena Saale station =

Railway station in Jena, Germany

Jena Saalebf
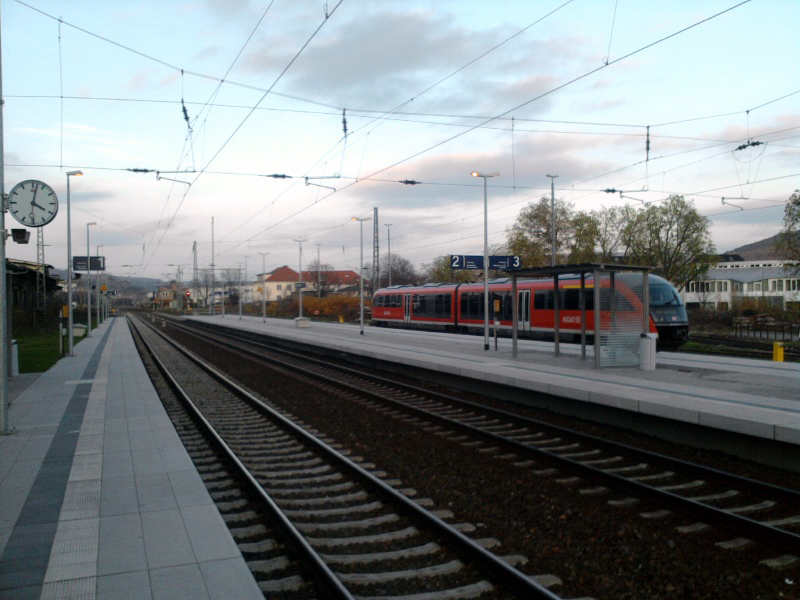
- Platform with a class 642 set

General information
- Location: Spitzweidenweg 28, Jena, Thuringia; Germany
- Coordinates: 50°56′13″N 11°35′37″E
- Owner: Deutsche Bahn
- Operator: DB Netz; DB Station&Service
- Line: Großheringen–Saalfeld (KBS 560)
- Platforms: 3

Construction
- Accessible: Platform 1 only

Other information
- Station code: 3044
- DS100 code: UJS
- IBNR: 8011058
- Category: 6
- Fare zone: VMT
- Website: www.bahnhof.de

History
- Opened: 30 April 1874

Services
Preceding station	Abellio Rail Mitteldeutschland	Following station
Jena Paradies towards Saalfeld (Saale)	RE 15	Terminus
Jena Paradies towards Saalfeld (Saale)	RB 25	Jena-Zwätzen towards Halle (Saale) Hbf
Preceding station		Following station
Terminus	RB 28	Jena Paradies towards Pößneck unt Bf
Location

Jena Saale station (Jena Saalbahnhof) is a station in the Jena suburb of Jena-Nord in the German state of Thuringia. It lies at line-kilometre 25.50 of the Großheringen–Saalfeld railway.

== History ==
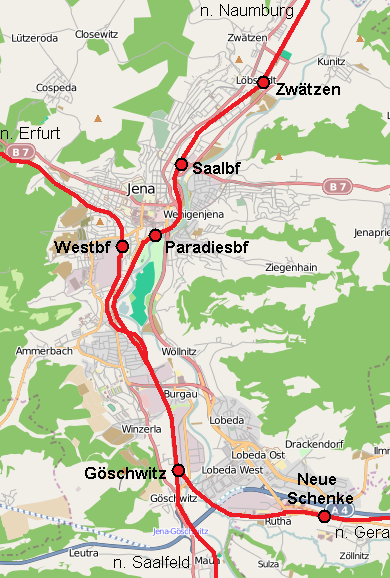
Location of the station in the city area

The station, which is 144.32 metres above sea level, was opened on 30 April 1874 with the opening of the Saale Railway (Saalbahn) between Großheringen and Saalfeld. The station on the Saale Railway, known as the Saalbahnhof, was soon called Jena Hauptbahnhof (main station) and, from 1909 until the commissioning of the provisional Jena Paradies station on 26 September 1999, was the city's main station for long-distance traffic that ran north–south. All the services on the Berlin–Munich route stopped here during that period.

The station, which was classified by Deutsche Reichsbahn as class II, is now designated as category 6. Between May 2006 and March 2007, Saal station was adapted to modern requirements and all facilities, which were no longer considered absolutely necessary, were demolished, including the canopy on platform 2/3, which was replaced by a sheltered waiting area. Saal station is now served by Regionalbahn services to and from Großheringen/Naumburg, Saalfeld and Pößneck.

Following changes in the use and ownership of the building, the Kulturbahnhof Jena (Culture station Jena) was created out of the entrance building and its annexes. This building is a heritage-listed monument.

== Infrastructure ==
=== Platforms ===
Platform	Length in m	Height in cm
1	120	55
2	120	55
3	120	55

=== Signal boxes ===
The station has been controlled by an electronic interlocking at Jena-Göschwitz and built by Siemens since 27 November 2011. One day before, the dispatchers signal box, "Jm", was taken out of operation. The guard signal box, "Js", was also closed. Until September 2006, there was another signal box, "Jn". All were mechanical signal boxes of the Jüdel type.

== Transport services ==
=== Regional services ===
In the 2022 timetable the following services stopped in Jena Saal station:

Line	Route	Interval (min)	Operator
RE 15	Leipzig – Naumburg (Saale) – Camburg (Saale) – Jena Saalbf – Orlamünde – Saalfeld (Saale)	120	Abellio
RB 25	Halle – Weißenfels – Naumburg (Saale) – Camburg (Saale) – Jena Saalbf – Orlamünde – Saalfeld (Saale)	60	Abellio
RB 28	Jena Saalbf – Jena Paradies – Orlamünde – Pößneck	120	Erfurter Bahn

=== Public transport services ===
(as of December 2019)
The Spittelplatz tram stop is served by tram lines 1 and 4. This stop is located west of the station on the B 88. It is accessible via Spitzweidenweg and only a few minutes' walk from the station.

The Saalbahnhof bus stop of bus route 15 is next to the railway station on Spitzweidenweg. Bus route 15 runs between Rautal – Stadtzentrum and Jena West station (Westbahnhof).
