= Großschwabhausen station =

Railway station in Germany

Großschwabhausen
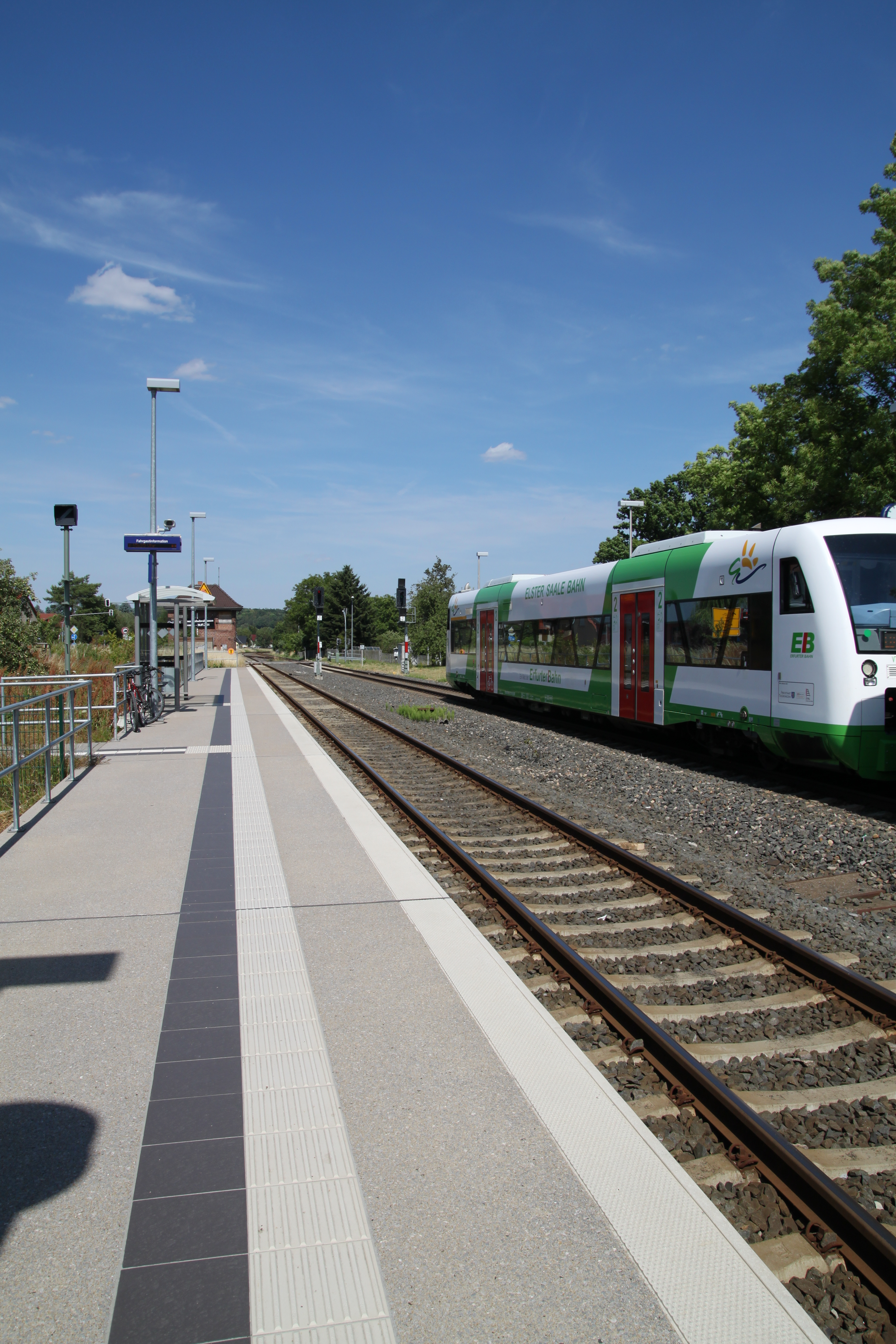
- 2014

General information
- Location: Am Bahnhof 69; 99441 Großschwabhausen; Thuringia; Germany
- Coordinates: 50.9369°N 11.4818°E
- Owner: Deutsche Bahn
- Operator: DB Station&Service
- Lines: Weimar–Gera railway (KBS 565)
- Platforms: 2 side platforms
- Tracks: 2
- Train operators: Erfurter Bahn

Other information
- Station code: 2365
- DS100 code: UGC
- IBNR: 8011762
- Category: 6
- Website: www.bahnhof.de

Services
Preceding station		Following station
Mellingen (Thür) towards Erfurt Hbf	RB 21	Jena West towards Gera Hbf
Location
- Location within Thuringia

Großschwabhausen station is a railway station in the municipality of Großschwabhausen, located in the Weimarer Land district in Thuringia, Germany.
