= Jena-Göschwitz station =

Rail station in Germany

Jena Göschwitz
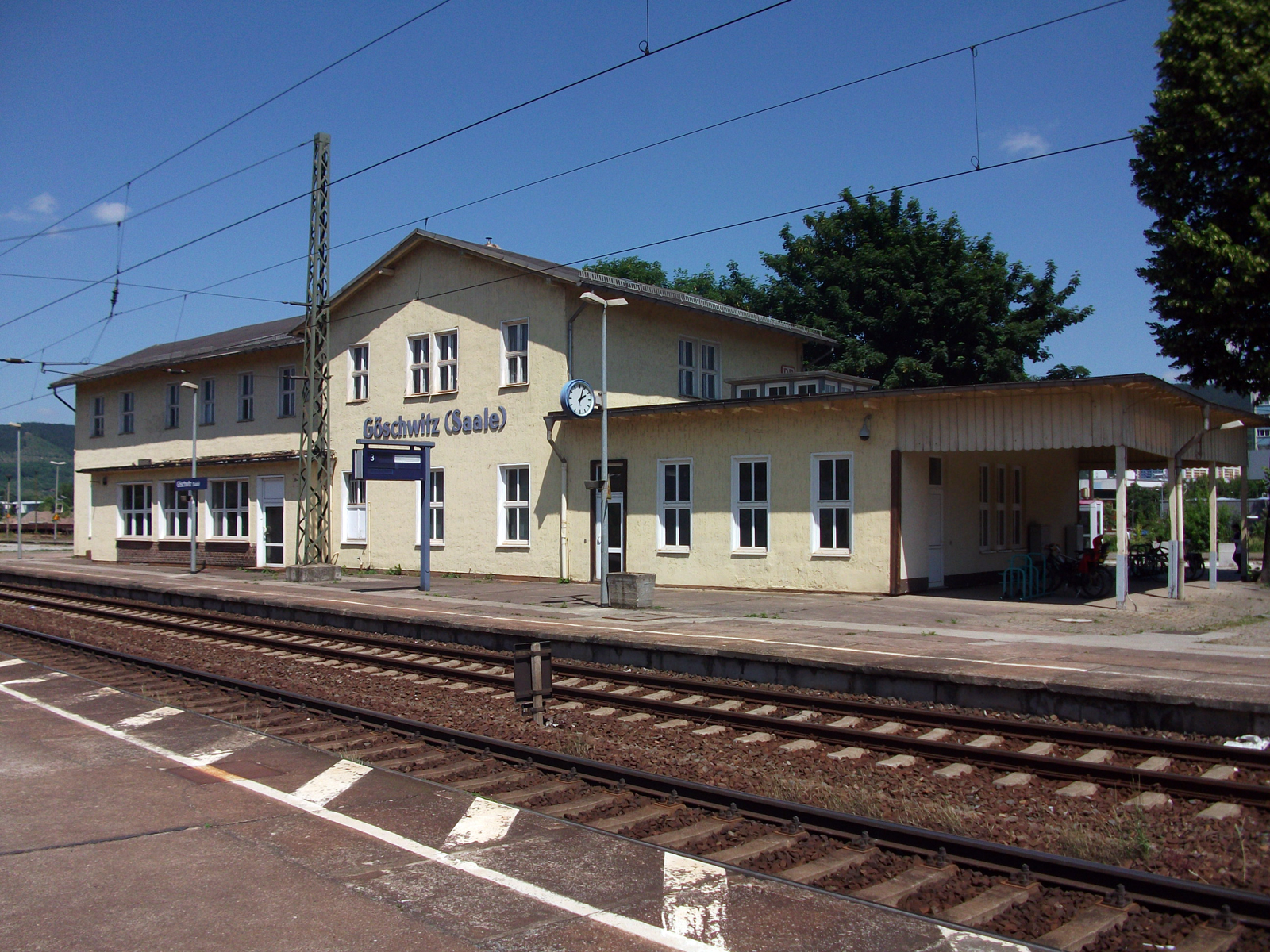
- Entrance building

General information
- Location: Am Bahnhof 2, Jena, Thuringia; Germany
- Coordinates: 50°53′12″N 11°35′33″E
- Owner: Deutsche Bahn
- Operator: DB Netz; DB Station&Service
- Lines: Großheringen–Saalfeld (KBS 560); Weimar–Gera (KBS 565)
- Platforms: 1 island platform 4 side platforms
- Tracks: 8

Construction
- Accessible: Yes

Other information
- Station code: 2201
- DS100 code: UGW
- IBNR: 8010133
- Category: 3
- Fare zone: VMT
- Website: www.bahnhof.de

History
- Opened: 1 July 1876; 150 years ago
- Electrified: 1941-1946; 28 May 1995; 31 years ago
- Former names: 1876-1953 Göschwitz; 1953-2010 Göschwitz/Saale
Services
Preceding station	DB Fernverkehr	Following station
Jena Paradies towards Berlin Gesundbrunnen	ICE 18	Saalfeld towards München Hbf
Jena West towards Köln Hbf	IC 51	Stadtroda towards Gera Hbf
Jena Paradies towards Leipzig Hbf	IC 61	Saalfeld towards Karlsruhe Hbf
Preceding station	DB Regio Bayern	Following station
Jena Paradies towards Leipzig Hbf	RE 42	Rothenstein (Saale) towards Nürnberg Hbf
Preceding station	DB Regio Südost	Following station
Jena West towards Göttingen	RE 1	Stadtroda towards Glauchau (Sachs)
Jena West towards Erfurt Hbf	RE 3	Stadtroda towards Altenburg or Greiz
Jena Paradies towards Halle (Saale) Hbf	RE 18	Terminus
Preceding station		Following station
Jena West towards Erfurt Hbf	RB 21	Neue Schenke towards Gera Hbf
Jena Paradies towards Jena Saale	RB 28	Rothenstein (Saale) towards Pößneck unt Bf
Preceding station	Abellio Rail Mitteldeutschland	Following station
Jena Paradies towards Jena Saal	RE 15	Kahla (Thür) towards Saalfeld (Saale)
Jena Paradies towards Halle (Saale) Hbf	RB 25	Rothenstein (Saale) towards Saalfeld (Saale)
Location
- Location within Thuringia Location within Germany Location within Europe

Jena-Göschwitz station (called Göschwitz (Saale) until December 2010) is a railway station in city of Jena in the German state of Thuringia. It is located 152.21 metres above sea level, 32.22 km from Großheringen on the Saal Railway and 27.50 from Weimar station on the Weimar–Gera railway. It opened on 1 July 1876 and is classified by Deutsche Bahn as a category 4 station.

== History ==
The station was originally a modest establishment with three tracks. In 1879, the Saal Railway Company (German: Saal-Eisenbahn-Gesellschaft) opened the current platform 2.

During World War II, the facilities were not badly damaged, in contrast to stations such as Jena Saale or Saalfeld. Between 1965 and 1973, the tracks were thoroughly refurbished by the East German Railways and the duplication of the adjacent sections of the line were restored (one track and the original electrification equipment had been removed after the war for reparations to the Soviet Union).

The entrance building of the Weimar-Gera Railway Company (Weimar-Geraer Eisenbahn-Gesellschaft) was shared with the Saal Railway Company. It was rebuilt in 1959.

Between 1994 and 1996, Göschwitz station was rebuilt when the Saal Railway was electrified and overhead line equipment was installed for the second time.

== Name ==
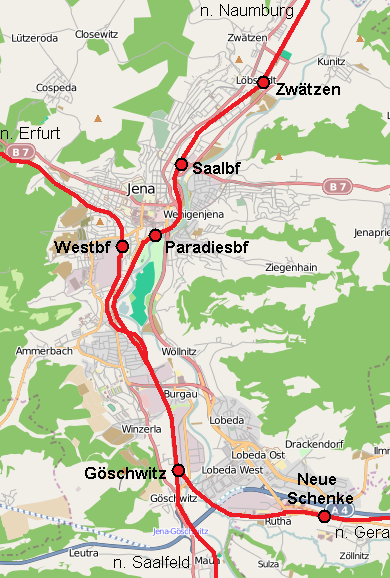
Location of the station in the urban area

In 1923, the city of Jena requested that the station be renamed from "Göschwitz" to "Jena Süd" (Jena South), but this was rejected. In 1953, East German Railways rejected a proposal by the mayor of Göschwitz to change the name to "Göschwitz/Saale" or "Jena Süd". The first option was preferred, because there was no proposal to re-incorporate Göschwitz in the city of Jena. Since 1969 Göschwitz has been incorporated in Jena, but the name of the station remained unchanged, so the city of Jena often submitted proposals for a name change to "Jena-Göschwitz”. In December 2010, Deutsche Bahn announced the station would be renamed "Jena-Göschwitz".

== Services ==
In the 2026 timetable, the following services stop at the station:

Line	Route	Frequency	Operator
ICE 18	Berlin Gesundbrunnen – Berlin – Leipzig – Jena-Göschwitz – Nuremberg – Augsburg – Munich	Once a day	DB Fernverkehr
IC 51	Düsseldorf/Köln – Dortmund – Kassel-Wilhelmshöhe – Eisenach – Erfurt – Weimar – Jena West – Jena-Göschwitz – Gera Hbf	Two train pairs	DB Fernverkehr (also as RE 51 between Erfurt and Gera)
IC 51	Kassel-Wilhelmshöhe – Bebra – Eisenach – Erfurt – Weimar – Jena West – Jena-Göschwitz – Gera Hbf	One train pair	DB Fernverkehr (also as RE 51 between Erfurt and Gera)
IC 61	Leipzig – Naumburg (Saale) – Jena-Göschwitz – Saalfeld (Saale) – Bamberg – Nuremberg – Aalen – Stuttgart – Karlsruhe	2 train pairs	DB Fernverkehr
RE 1	Göttingen – Leinefelde – Erfurt – Weimar – Jena West – Jena-Göschwitz – Gera – Glauchau (Sachs)	120	DB Regio Südost
RE 3	Erfurt – Weimar – Jena West – Jena-Göschwitz – Gera – Altenburg / Greiz	120	DB Regio Südost
RE 3	Erfurt – Weimar – Jena West – Jena-Göschwitz	120	DB Regio Südost
RE 15	Saalfeld (Saale) – Rudolstadt – Kahla – Jena-Göschwitz – Jena Paradies – Jena Saalbahnhof	120	Abellio Rail Mitteldeutschland
RE 18	Jena-Göschwitz – Jena Paradies – Bad Kösen – Naumburg (Saale) – Weißenfels – Merseburg – Halle (Saale)	120	DB Regio Südost
RE 42	Leipzig – Naumburg (Saale) – Jena-Göschwitz – Saalfeld (Saale) – Kronach – Lichtenfels – Bamberg – Nuremberg	120	DB Regio Bayern
RB 21	Erfurt – Weimar – Jena West – Jena-Göschwitz – Hermsdorf-Klosterlausnitz – Gera	60 (Mon–Fri); 120 (Sat–Sun)	Erfurter Bahn
RB 25	Saalfeld (Saale) – Rudolstadt – Kahla – Jena-Göschwitz – Bad Kösen – Naumburg (Saale) – Weißenfels – Merseburg – Halle (Saale)	60	Abellio Rail Mitteldeutschland
RB 28	Jena Saalbahnhof – Jena Paradies – Jena-Göschwitz – Kahla (Thür) – Orlamünde – Pößneck	60	Erfurter Bahn
