= Artern station =

Railway station in Thuringia, Germany

Artern
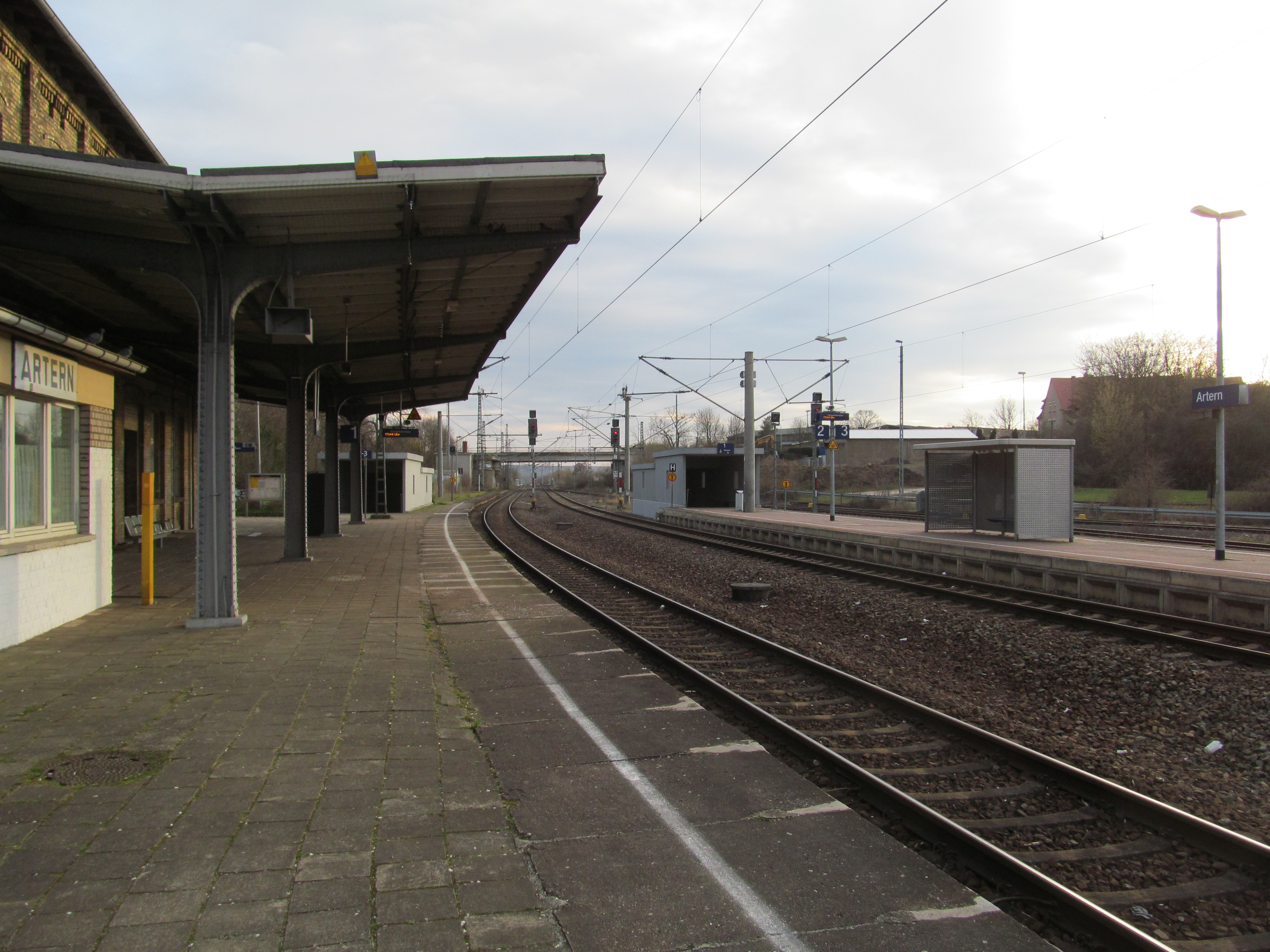
- 2019

General information
- Location: Bahnhofstraße; 06556 Artern; Thuringia; Germany
- Coordinates: 51°21′48″N 11°18′38″E
- System: Bf
- Owner: Deutsche Bahn
- Operator: DB Station&Service
- Lines: Sangerhausen–Erfurt railway (KBS 335); Naumburg–Reinsdorf railway (KBS 585); Berga-Kelbra–Artern railway
- Platforms: 1 island platform 1 side platform
- Tracks: 5
- Train operators: Abellio Rail Mitteldeutschland

Construction
- Parking: yes
- Cycle facilities: yes
- Accessible: partly

Other information
- Station code: 185
- DS100 code: UAT
- IBNR: 8012440
- Category: 6
- Website: www.bahnhof.de

Services
Preceding station	Abellio Rail Mitteldeutschland	Following station
Heldrungen towards Erfurt Hbf	RE 10	Voigtstedt towards Magdeburg Hbf
Reinsdorf (Artern) towards Erfurt Hbf	RB 59	Sangerhausen Terminus
Location
- Location within Thuringia Location within Germany Location within Europe

Artern station is a railway station in the municipality of Artern, located in the Kyffhäuserkreis district in Thuringia, Germany.
