= Rudolstadt (Thür) station =

Railway station in Germany

Rudolstadt (Thür)
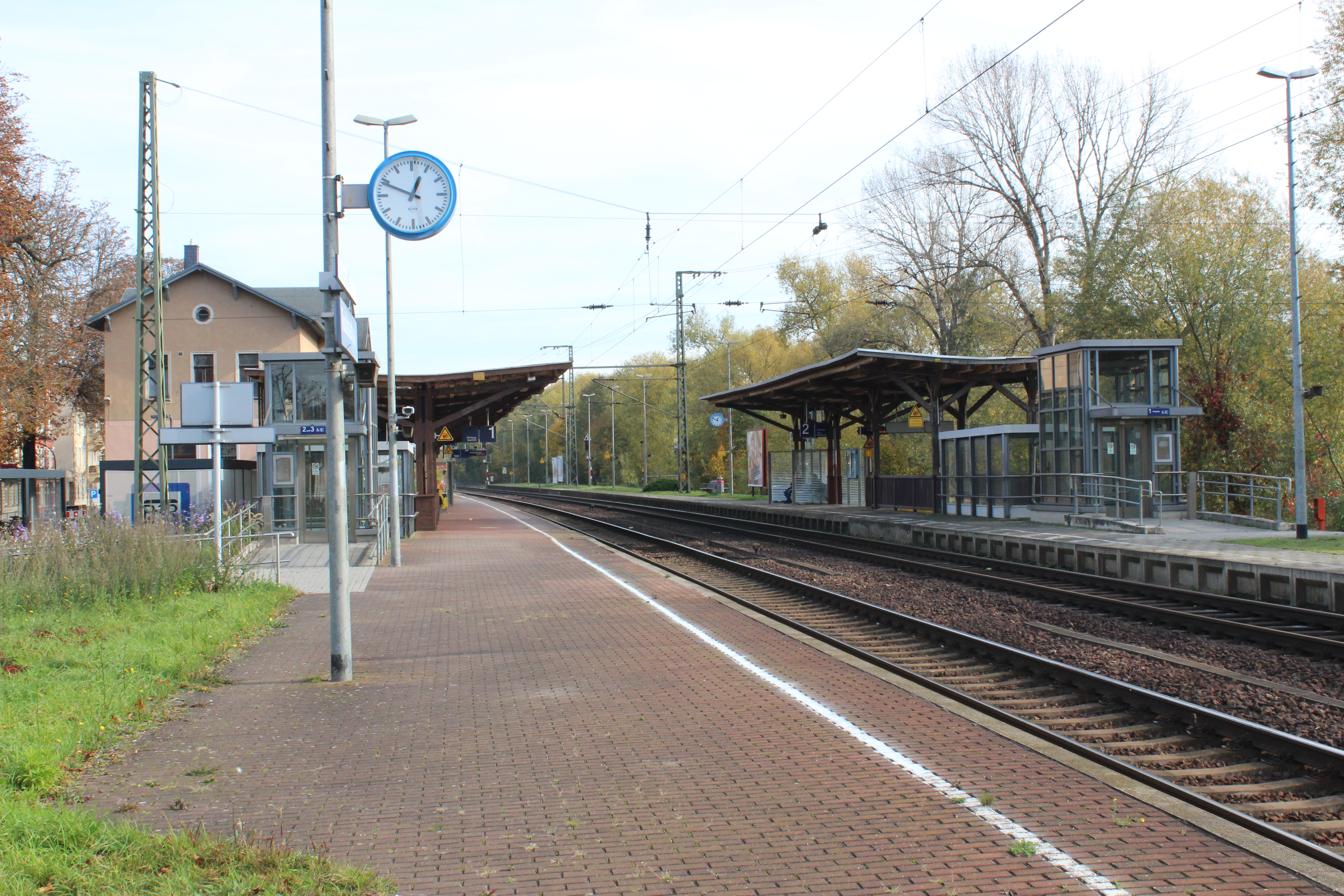
- 2017

General information
- Location: Am Saaldamm/ODF-Platz; 07407 Rudolstadt; Thuringia; Germany
- Coordinates: 50.7181°N 11.3391°E
- Elevation: 194 m (636 ft)
- System: Bf
- Owner: Deutsche Bahn
- Operator: DB Netz; DB Station&Service
- Lines: Saalbahn (KBS 560)
- Platforms: 2 side platforms
- Tracks: 2
- Train operators: Abellio Rail Mitteldeutschland; DB Regio Bayern

Construction
- Parking: yes
- Cycle facilities: yes
- Accessible: yes

Other information
- Station code: 5418
- DS100 code: UR
- IBNR: 8010306
- Category: 4
- Website: www.bahnhof.de

History
- Opened: 1 May 1874; 152 years ago

Services
| Preceding station | DB Fernverkehr | Following station |
|---|---|---|
| Saalfeld (Saale) towards Karlsruhe Hbf | IC 61 | Jena-Göschwitz towards Leipzig Hbf |
| Preceding station | Abellio Rail Mitteldeutschland | Following station |
| Rudolstadt-Schwarza towards Saalfeld (Saale) | RE 15 | Kahla (Thür) towards Leipzig Hbf |
| Rudolstadt-Schwarza towards Saalfeld (Saale) | RB 25 | Uhlstädt towards Halle (Saale) Hbf |
| Preceding station | DB Regio Bayern | Following station |
| Rudolstadt-Schwarza towards Nürnberg Hbf | RE 42 | Kahla (Thür) towards Leipzig Hbf |
Location
- Location within Thuringia Location within Germany Location within Europe

Rudolstadt (Thür) station (German: Bahnhof Rudolstadt (Thür)) is a railway station in the municipality of Rudolstadt, located in the Saalfeld-Rudolstadt district in Thuringia, Germany.
