= Weimar–Gera railway =

Railway line in Germany

Weimar–Jena–Gera
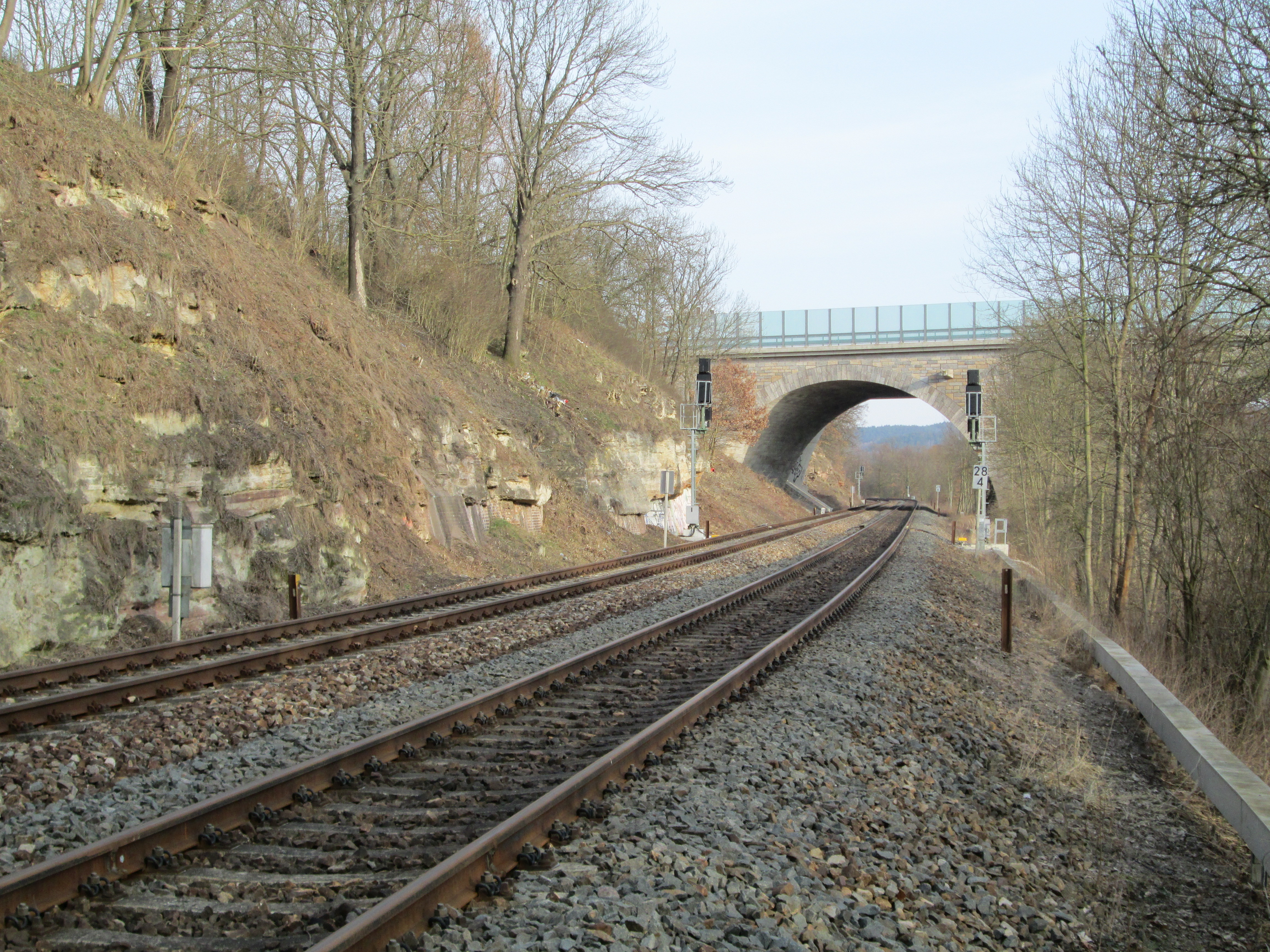
- Weimar–Gera railway

Overview
- Native name: Holzlandbahn
- Line number: 6307
- Locale: Thuringia, Germany

Service
- Route number: 565

Technical
- Line length: 68.0 km (42.3 mi)
- Track gauge: 1,435 mm (4 ft 8 1/2 in) standard gauge

The Weimar–Gera railway is a line in the German state of Thuringia, connecting the city of Weimar via Jena, Stadtroda and Hermsdorf to Gera. It was built by the Weimar-Gera Railway Company (Weimar-Geraer Eisenbahn-Gesellschaft), which was founded in June 1872, and the line was officially accepted into operation in June 1876.

It is now part of the Mid-German Connection and is listed by Deutsche Bahn in its timetable as the Holzlandbahn ("Woodland Railway") because its eastern section runs through the Thuringian Holzland (not to be confused with the Thuringian Forest).

== Route ==
The line starts at Weimar station in northern Weimar, which it leaves to the east. It branches off the Thuringian railway at a grade-separated junction and runs to the south and then curves to the southeast, crossing the valley of the Ilm on a large viaduct and then runs on the eastern slope of the Ilm valley to Mellingen. It then goes through the Lehnstedt land to Großschwabhausen, where the line reaches a height of about 325 metres on the Ilm-Saale Plateau (Ilm-Saale-Platte). From Großschwabhausen it runs through the Schwabhäuser land and the Jena Mühl valley down to Jena, where it runs on the western slopes of the Saale valley past the city centre to Jena West station. Further south, it crosses the Saal Railway and continues to Jena-Göschwitz station on separate tracks parallel with the Saal Railway.

After Göschwitz the line crosses the Saale and runs through the valley of the Roda to Stadtroda and then through the Zeitzgrund woodland to Hermsdorf in the Holzland. From Hermsdorf the line runs east of the valley of the Erlbach to Kraftsdorf and Töppeln to Gera, where it ends at the former Prussian station (preußischen Bahnhof), now the Hauptbahnhof.

Before the Second World War, the line was an important east-west connection and upgraded with double track. The second track was dismantled for reparations to the Soviet Union. At the time of German reunification, the second track had been restored only on the Jena West–Neue Schenke, Stadtroda–Papiermühle and Kraftsdorf–Töppeln sections. Since then the Großschwabhausen–Jena West and the Hermsdorf-Klosterlausnitz–Kraftsdorf sections have been duplicated. There are still single-track sections between Weimar and Großschwabhausen, between Neue Schenke and Stadtroda, between Papiermühle and Hermsdorf-Klosterlausnitz and between Töppeln and Gera. It is proposed to duplicate the first two sections by 2014, as they are a considerable obstacle to the operation of trains at 30-minute intervals on the line, which connects the four largest cities of Thuringia. However, the federal government has not given a commitment to finance this project.

Little freight runs on the line as demand is low and there is little spare capacity for it anyway. The lack of electrification means that the line is only served by diesel multiple units. Although Deutsche Bahn operates its largest DMU, the class 612, with three sets running in combination, traffic demand to and from Jena, has not grown. The two stations in the city of Jena are in poor condition, but they may also be modernised by 2014.

== Transport Operations ==
- RE 1: Göttingen–Leinefelde–Gotha–Erfurt–Weimar–Jena–Gera–Gößnitz–Chemnitz / Zwickau (every 120 minute)
- RE 3: Erfurt–Weimar–Jena–Gera–Altenburg (every 120 minutes)
- EB 21: Weimar–Jena–Göschwitz–Gera (to Göschwitz: every 60 minutes Mon–Fri, every 120 minutes Sat/Sun; to Gera: every 120 minutes).

=== Transfer connections ===
==== Connection to long distance transport ====
- In Weimar, there is connection with the hourly high-speed Intercity-Express services of line 50: (Saarbrücken–Mannheim) / Wiesbaden–Frankfurt–Eisenach–Weimar–Leipzig–Dresden, and some two hourly InterCity services of line 45: Düsseldorf–Paderborn–Bebra–Weimar–Eisenach (Halle (Saale)–Berlin (–Stralsund–Ostseebad Binz)) / (Leipzig–Dresden) plus the City Night Line pair of trains, Semper, to Leipzig–Dresden and to Frankfurt am Main–Zurich.
- Jena West is a ten-minute walk or a bus or taxi ride away from Jena Paradies station, which is served hourly by ICE line 28 from/to Berlin–Hamburg or Nuremberg–Munich.

==== Public transport links from other routes ====
- In Weimar it is possible to interchange with RB services on the Thuringian Railway to Eisenach via Halle (Saale) and on the Ilm Valley Railway to Bad Berka and Kranichfeld.
- At Jena-Göschwitz station, RB services operate on various routes: Jena–Großheringen/Naumburg, Jena–Kahla–Saalfeld, Jena–Pößneck / (Saalfeld–Blankenstein) and Jena–Probstzella–Kronach–Lichtenfels.
- At Gera Hauptbahnhof, interchange is possible with RB, RE and Vogtlandbahn services to and from Leipzig, Altenburg, Gößnitz–Chemnitz / Zwickau, Greiz–Weischlitz, Hof–Regensburg and Saalfeld (Saale).
