= Gera Hauptbahnhof =

Railway halt in Gera, Germany

Gera Hbf
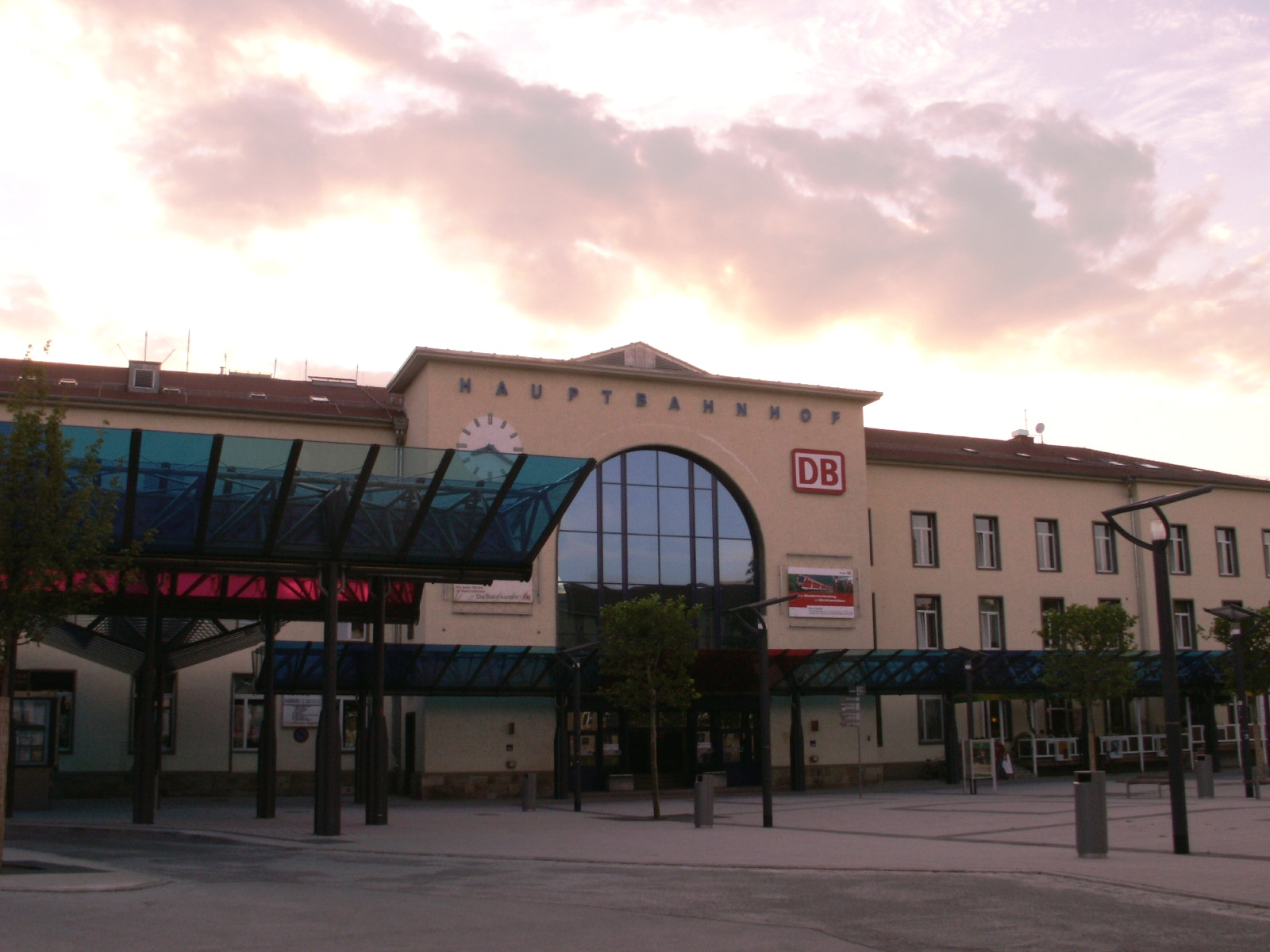

General information
- Location: Bahnhofsplatz 3-9, Gera, Thuringia; Germany
- Coordinates: 50°52′59″N 12°04′38″E
- Owner: Deutsche Bahn
- Operator: DB Station&Service
- Lines: Gößnitz–Gera (KBS 540); Gera–Weischlitz (KBS 541); Weimar–Gera (KBS 565); Leipzig–Probstzella (KBS 550, 555)
- Platforms: 6

Construction
- Accessible: Yes

Other information
- Station code: 2073
- DS100 code: UG
- IBNR: 8010125
- Category: 3
- Fare zone: VMT: 40
- Website: www.bahnhof.de

History
- Opened: 19 March 1859

Passengers
- ca. 10,000
Services
Preceding station	DB Fernverkehr	Following station
Hermsdorf-Klosterlausnitz towards Köln Hbf	IC 51	Terminus
Preceding station	DB Regio Südost	Following station
Hermsdorf-Klosterlausnitz towards Göttingen	RE 1	Gera Süd towards Glauchau (Sachs)
Hermsdorf-Klosterlausnitz towards Erfurt Hbf	RE 3	Gera Süd towards Altenburg or Greiz
Preceding station	Vogtlandbahn	Following station
Terminus	RB 4	Gera Süd towards Weischlitz
Preceding station		Following station
Gera Süd towards Saalfeld (Saale)	RE 12	Gera-Langenberg towards Leipzig Hbf
Gera Süd towards Hof Hbf	RB 13	Gera-Langenberg towards Leipzig Hbf
Töppeln towards Erfurt Hbf	RB 21	Terminus
Gera Süd towards Saalfeld (Saale)	RB 22	Bad Köstritz towards Leipzig Hbf
Location

Gera Central Station (Gera Hauptbahnhof) is the main station of the Thuringian town of Gera. Gera is one of the largest cities in Germany with no long-distance rail connections and no electrified lines. The station is a significant regional transport hub. The station is classified by Deutsche Bahn as a category 3 station.

== History ==
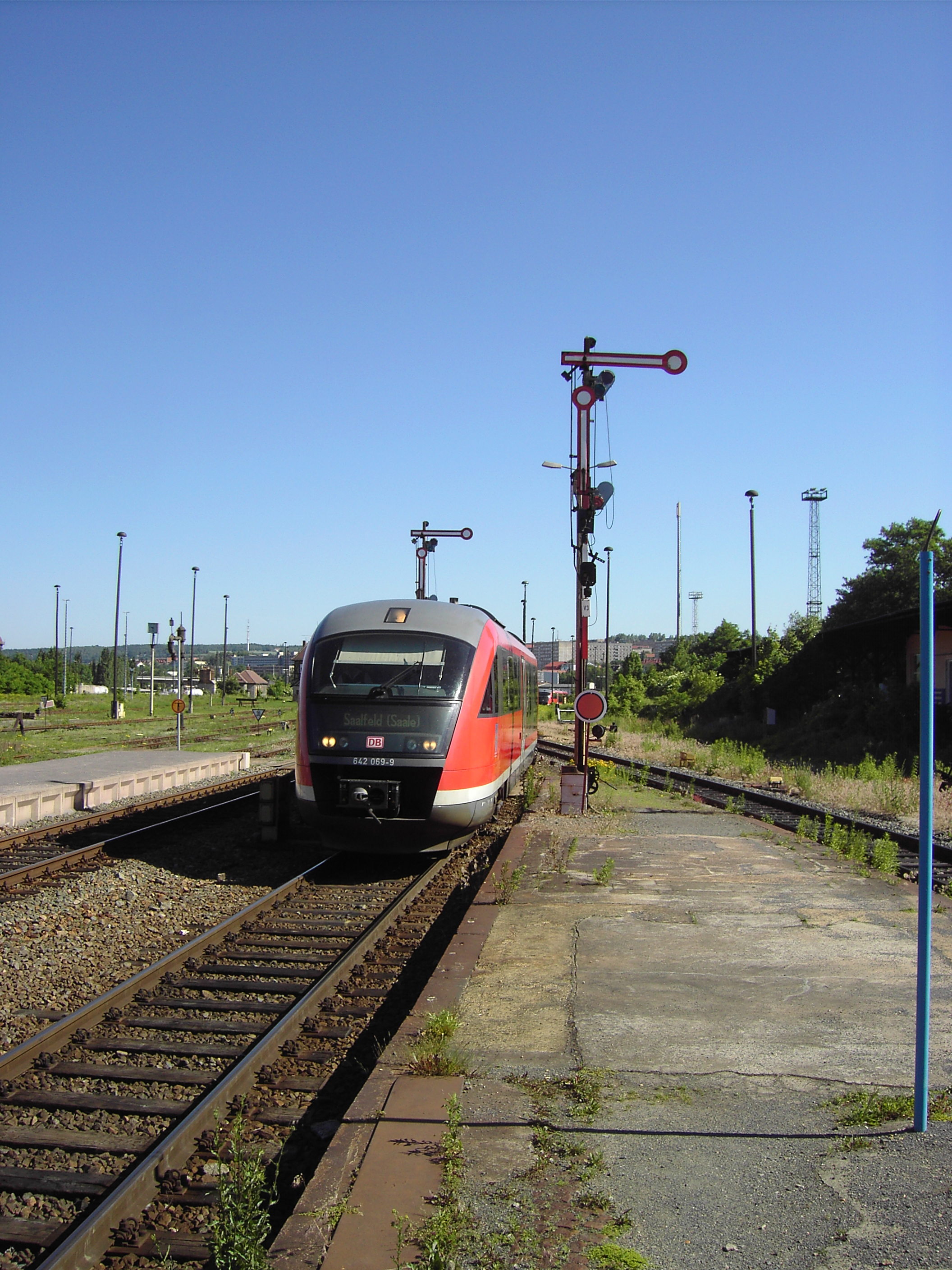
Class 642 diesel multiple unit to Saalfeld running into Gera station

The railway was extended in 1859 from Weißenfels to Gera via Zeitz (the Weißenfels–Zeitz and Leipzig–Probstzella lines). At that time, the first station was built at the site of today's Hauptbahnhof as the Prussian station (Preußische Bahnhof), as distinct from the Saxon station (Sächsischen Bahnhof) at today's Gera Süd station. In the following years further lines were built converging on Gera Hauptbahnhof: in 1865 the connection with the Leipzig–Hof line at Gößnitz to the east, in 1871 to Saalfeld in the south-west (Leipzig–Probstzella line), in 1873 to Leipzig in the north (Leipzig–Probstzella line), in 1875 to Plauen in the south (Elster Valley Railway), in 1876 to Erfurt in the west (Weimar–Gera line) and to Zwickau in the south-east (Werdau–Weida–Mehltheuer line), in 1880 to Eisenberg in the northwest (Crossen–Porstendorf line) and in 1883 to Zeulenroda-Triebes and Hof in the south east (Werdau–Weida–Mehltheuer line). Located north of the passenger station was a combined marshalling and yard, connected to a railway depot, both of which are now closed. In 1892, shortly after the opening of the tram network, a facility was built in the freight yard for transferring freight wagons, supported by metre-gauge tram bogies, over the tram lines to factories in Gera. A tram line was opened in 1893 from the station to the central city.

In 1881 the reception building was built by the architects of Hude & Hennicke. During the reconstruction of 1958/63 several ornaments were removed from the facade.

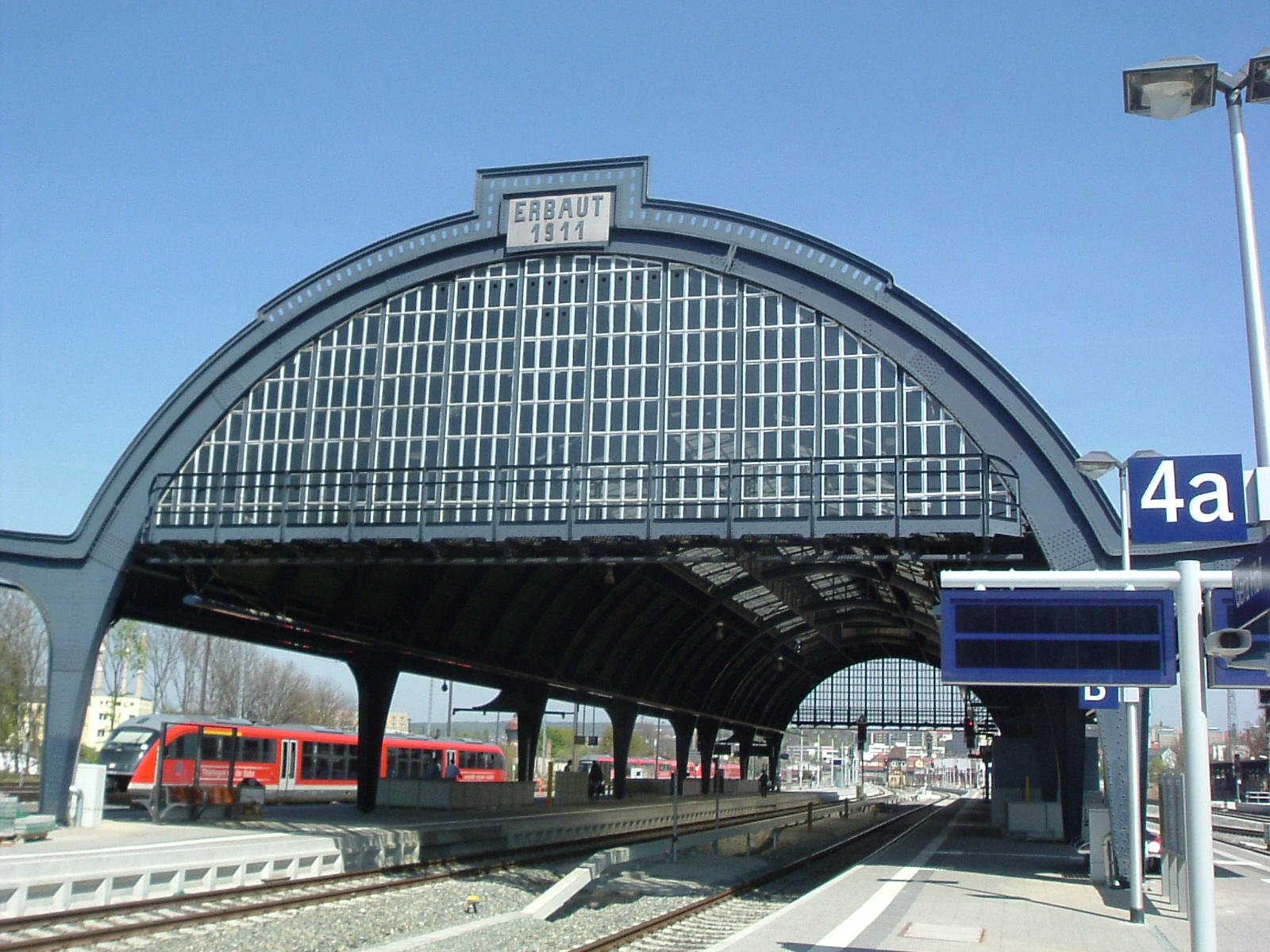
Station hall 2007

The heyday of the station was between the two world wars, after the glass concourse was completed in 1911. At that time some of the Berlin–Leipzig–Munich traffic ran via Gera and the lines to Saalfeld, Erfurt and Leipzig were double track.

After the Second World War, the second track was removed as war reparations to the Soviet Union. Gera lost its importance as a junction because of the division of German. The major north-south traffic from Berlin to Bavaria no longer stopped at the station.

After German reunification, some secondary lines were closed down (to Zwickau via Wünschendorf and to Eisenberg), while the building of new infrastructure has also been discussed. Politically, this is highly controversial, especially the Mid Germany Connection (Mitte-Deutschland-Verbindung), running in an east-west direction through Gera.

In the 1990s there were long-distance trains through Gera, but north–south traffic shifted to the electrified, double track and upgraded Saal line through Jena and east–west traffic runs on the electrified, double track and upgraded lines through Leipzig, so now only regional traffic runs through the station. Between 2002 and 2006, a private InterConnex service operated to Berlin and on to Rostock, but in 2006 it was replaced for cost reasons by an electrically operated service, which therefore had to terminate in Leipzig, rather than Gera.

=== 2005–2007 reconstruction ===
From 2005 to 2007 the station was extensively renovated and formally re-dedicated in April 2007, shortly before the opening of the 2007 Federal Garden Show. The Gera tramway was reconnected to the station and the Garden Show site at the same time.

== Operations ==
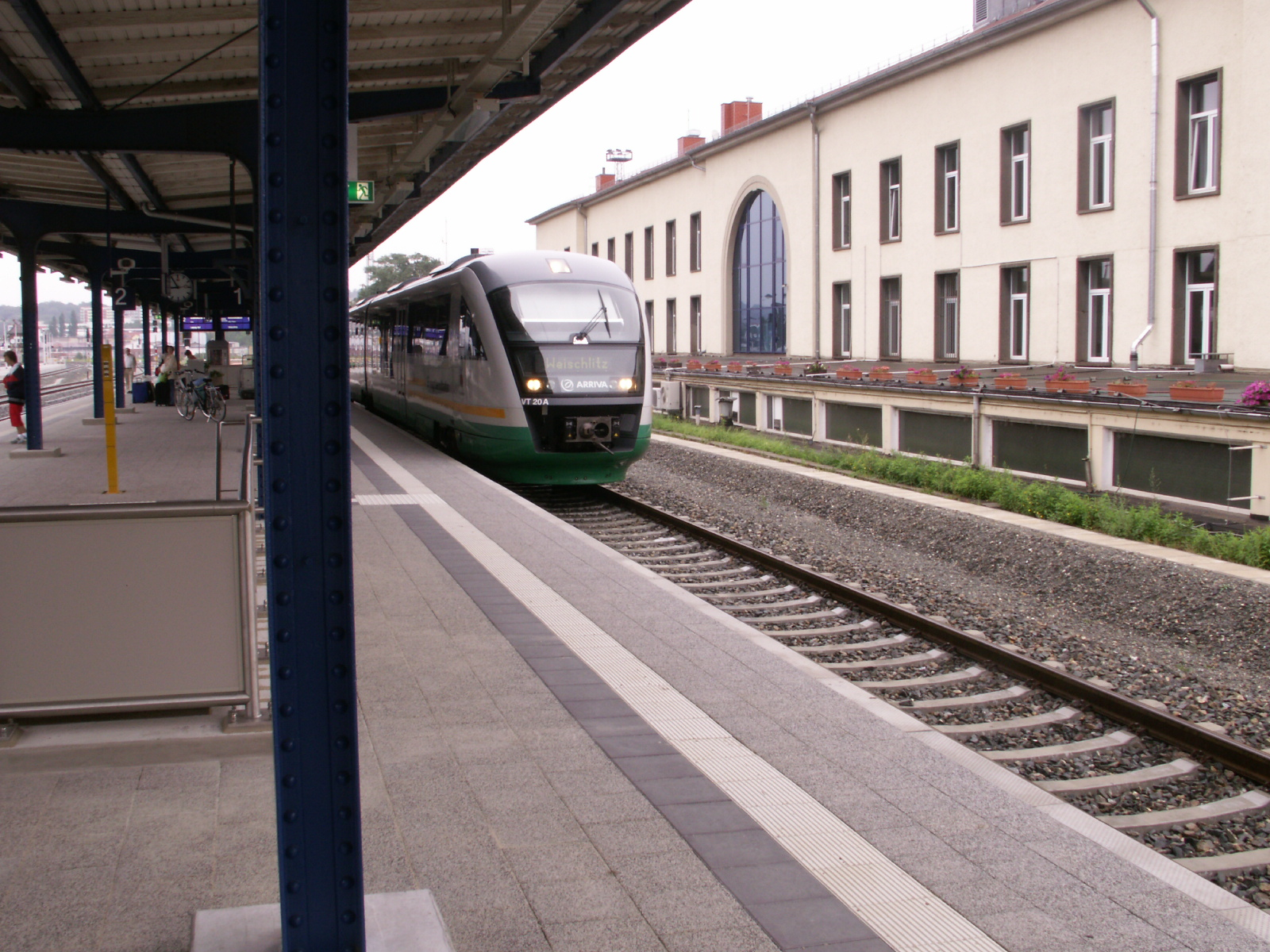
Vogtlandbahn train to Weischlitz on track 1

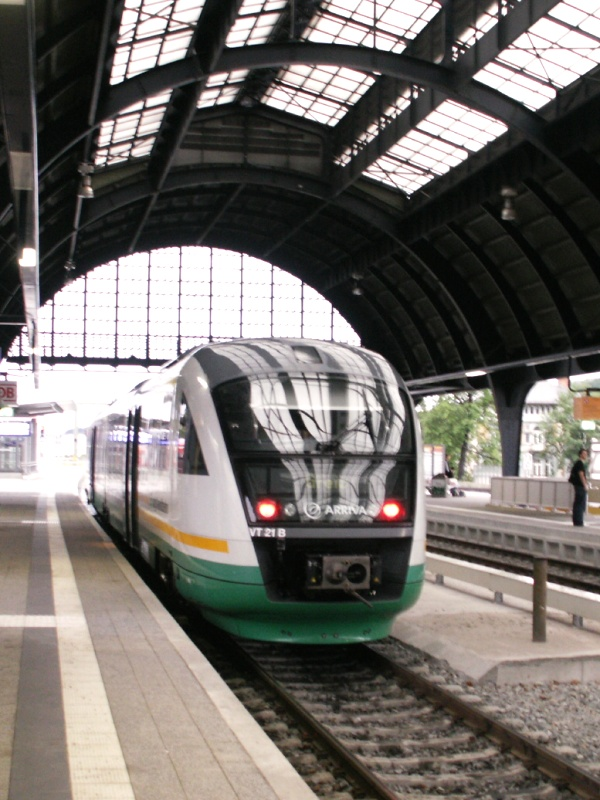
Vogtlandbahn train to Greiz on track 4

The following lines of DB Fernverkehr, DB Regio, Erfurter Bahn and Vogtlandbahn stop in Gera Hbf (2022 timetable):

Line	Route	Frequency
IC 51	Gera – Weimar – Erfurt – Gotha – Eisenach – Kassel-Wilhelmshöhe – (Paderborn – Hamm – Dortmund – Bochum – Essen – Düsseldorf/Cologne)	6 h
RE 1	Göttingen – Erfurt – Jena-Göschwitz – Gera – Gößnitz – Glauchau (Sachs)	120 min
RE 3	Erfurt – Weimar – Gera – Ronneburg (Thür) – Altenburg / Greiz	120 min
RE 12	Leipzig – Zeitz – Gera – Weida – Pößneck ob Bf – Saalfeld (Saale) – Blankenstein (Saale)	120 min
RB 4	Gera – Wünschendorf – Berga (Elster) – Greiz – Plauen (Vogtland) Mitte – Weischlitz	120 min
RB 13	Gera – Weida – Zeulenroda unt Bf – Mehltheuer – Hof	120 min
RB 21	Gera – Hermsdorf-Klosterlausnitz – Jena-Göschwitz – Weimar – Erfurt	60 min 120 min
RB 22	Leipzig – Zeitz – Gera – Weida – Pößneck ob Bf – Saalfeld (Saale)	120 min

=== Tracks ===
The station has several tracks, but only six of them have a platform. Trains currently operate (as of 2010) as follows:

- Track 1: Trains to Greiz / Plauen / Weischlitz and Cheb
- Track 2: Trains to Erfurt / Leinefelde / Göttingen and Mehltheuer / Hof / Regensburg
- Track 3: Trains to Leipzig / Weimar / Greiz and Altenburg
- Track 4: Trains to Erfurt / Zeulenroda and Saalfeld
- Platform 5: Trains to Leipzig / Weimar / Saalfeld
- Track 6: trains to Leipzig / Katzhütte / Saalfeld / Chemnitz, and Zwickau

=== Hauptbahnhof / Theatre bus and tram stop ===
The Gera bus station is in front of the station. It is the beginning and end of the regional transport bus routes of the Gera/Land Regional Transport Company (Regionalverkehr Gera/Land GmbH, RVG); the Passenger and Tourist Traffic Company (Personen- und Reiseverkehrs GmbH, PRG); the bus operator, Piehler; the THÜSAC Passenger Transport Company; and the Saale-Orla Rudolstadt Bus Transport Company (Omnibusverkehr Saale-Orla Rudolstadt GmbH, OVS). Since November 2006, the newly opened Stadtbahn (light rail) line 1 of the Gera tramway has run through a tunnel under the platforms of the station.

== See also ==
- Rail transport in Germany
- Railway stations in Germany

== Literature ==
- Frister, Thomas (1999). Verkehrsknoten Gera (in German). Freiburg: EK-Verlag. ISBN 3-88255-268-9.
