= Weimar station =

Railway station in Weimar, Germany

Weimar
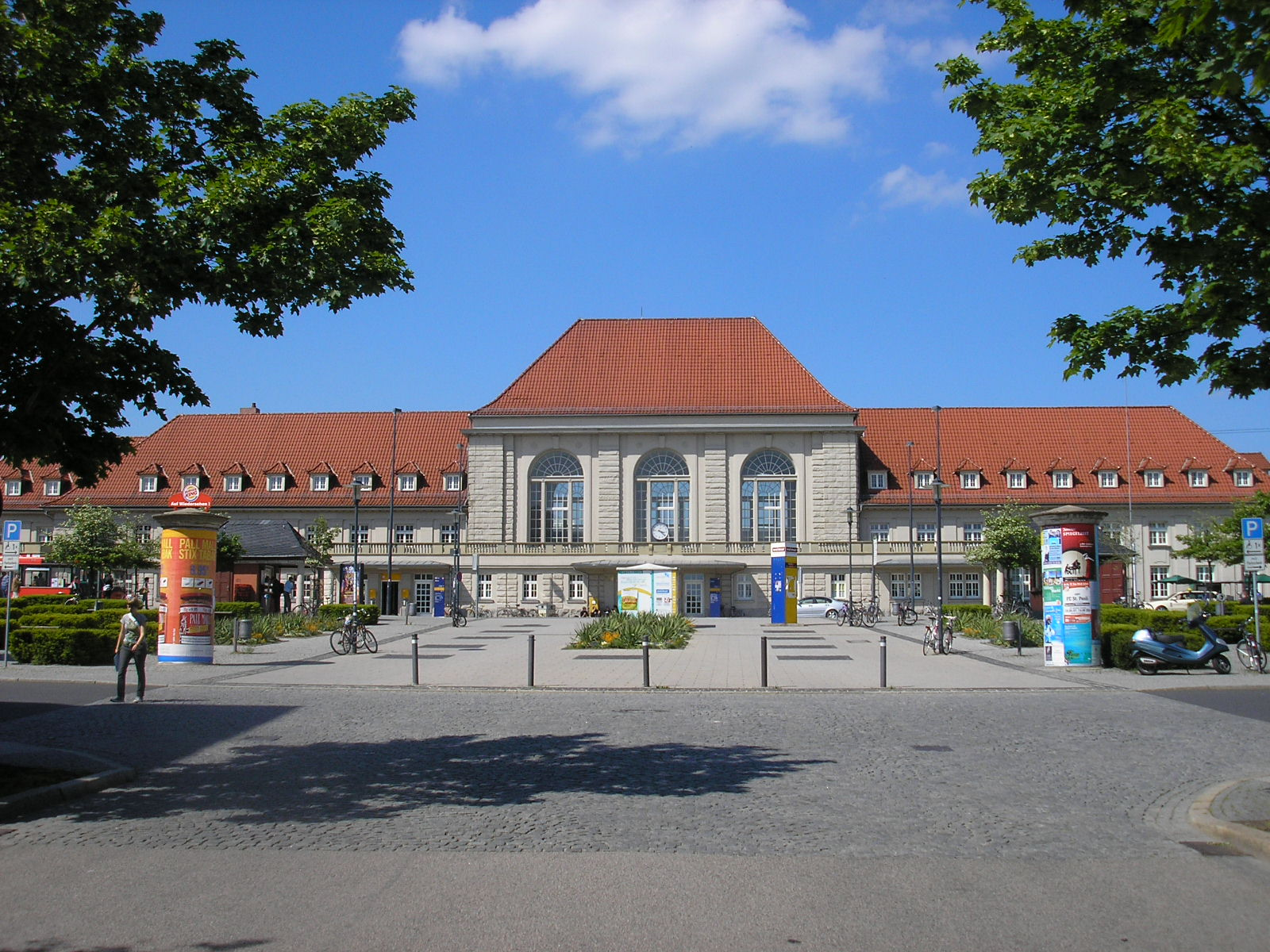

General information
- Location: Schopenhauerstr. 2, Weimar, Thuringia; Germany
- Coordinates: 50°59′30″N 11°19′37″E
- Owner: Deutsche Bahn
- Operator: DB Station&Service
- Lines: Thuringian Railway; Weimar–Gera railway; Ilm Valley Railway
- Platforms: 5

Construction
- Accessible: Yes

Other information
- Station code: 6617
- DS100 code: UWM
- IBNR: 8010366
- Category: 3
- Website: www.bahnhof.de

History
- Opened: 19 December 1846; 179 years ago
- Electrified: 22 September 1967; 58 years ago

Services
Preceding station	DB Fernverkehr	Following station
Erfurt Hbf towards Köln Hbf	IC 51	Jena West towards Gera Hbf
Preceding station	Abellio Rail Mitteldeutschland	Following station
Erfurt Hbf Terminus	RE 16	Apolda towards Halle (Saale) Hbf
Erfurt Hbf Terminus	RE 17	Apolda towards Leipzig Hbf
Hopfgarten (Weimar) towards Eisenach	RB 20	Oßmannstedt towards Leipzig Hbf
Preceding station	DB Regio Südost	Following station
Erfurt Hbf towards Göttingen	RE 1	Jena West towards Glauchau (Sachs)
Erfurt Hbf Terminus	RE 3	Jena West towards Altenburg or Greiz
Preceding station		Following station
Vieselbach towards Erfurt Hbf	RB 21	Oberweimar towards Gera Hbf
Terminus	RB 26	Weimar West towards Kranichfeld
Location
- Location within Thuringia Location within Germany Location within Europe

Weimar station is the main station in the city of Weimar in the German state of Thuringia, located on the Thuringian Railway. It is an Intercity-Express stop on the line between Frankfurt am Main and Dresden. Weimar station is classified by Deutsche Bahn as a category 3 station. It is officially designated as a KulturBahnhof ("culture station”), as the station's panels are noted. It is about one kilometre north of central Weimar at the end of the street of Carl-August-Allee.

== History ==
The station was built in 1846 as a terminus of the Thuringian Railway from Halle. In 1847 the line was continued west to Erfurt, and to Bebra in 1849. In 1876 this was followed by a second line to Jena and Gera. In 1887, a third line opened to Bad Berka, Kranichfeld and Blankenhain (the Ilm Valley Railway). In the same year, a fourth line was connected to the station, the metre gauge Weimar-Rastenberg Railway line to Großrudestedt in Sömmerda. It was closed in 1946.

During the period of the Weimar Republic, Weimar was the state capital of Thuringia. Therefore, a new, prestigious reception building was built at that time in the neo-classical style. Under Nazism the station played a special role as the beginning a line for the transport of prisoners to Buchenwald concentration camp.

During the existence of East Germany the line from Naumburg to Erfurt was electrified. Weimar station had 116 regular arrivals and departures of long-distance trains in the summer timetable of 1989, making it the fifth place station in the network of the East German railways.

== Rail services ==
The station has five platforms. The following services call at the station:

Line	Route		Frequency (min)	Operator
IC 51	Düsseldorf/Köln – Dortmund – Kassel – Eisenach – Erfurt – Weimar – Jena West – Jena-Göschwitz – Gera		2 train pairs	DB Fernverkehr (also runs as RE 51 between Erfurt and Gera)
IC 51	Kassel-Wilhelmshöhe – Bebra – Eisenach – Erfurt – Weimar – Jena West – Jena-Göschwitz – Gera		1 train pair	DB Fernverkehr (also runs as RE 51 between Erfurt and Gera)
IC 51	Leipzig – Weimar – Erfurt – Gotha – Eisenach – Fulda – Hanau – Frankfurt (Main) – Karlsruhe		Some trains, relief trains (Fri, Sun)	DB Fernverkehr (also runs as RE 51 between Erfurt and Weimar)
IC 51	Köln/Düsseldorf – Essen – Bochum – Dortmund – Kassel – Bebra – Eisenach – Erfurt – Weimar – Leipzig		Some trains, relief trains (Fri, Sun)	DB Fernverkehr (also runs as RE 51 between Erfurt and Weimar)
RE 1	Göttingen – Leinefelde – Gotha – Erfurt – Weimar – Jena-Göschwitz – Gera – Gößnitz – Glauchau		120	DB Regio Südost
RE 3	Erfurt – Weimar – Jena-Göschwitz – Gera –	Altenburg	120	DB Regio Südost
RE 3	Erfurt – Weimar – Jena-Göschwitz – Gera –	Greiz – Elsterberg	120	DB Regio Südost
RE 3	Erfurt – Weimar – Jena West – Jena-Göschwitz		120	DB Regio Südost
RE 16	Erfurt – Weimar – Apolda – Großheringen – Bad Kösen – Naumburg (Saale) – Halle (Saale)		120 (alternierend)	Abellio Rail Mitteldeutschland
RE 17	Erfurt – Weimar – Apolda – Bad Sulza – Bad Kösen – Naumburg (Saale)		120 (alternierend)	Abellio Rail Mitteldeutschland
RB 20	Eisenach – Gotha – Erfurt – Weimar – Apolda – Naumburg (Saale) – Weißenfels – Großkorbetha – Leipzig		60	Abellio Rail Mitteldeutschland
RB 21	Erfurt – Weimar – Oberweimar – Jena-Göschwitz – Stadtroda – Hermsdorf-Klosterlausnitz – Gera		60 (Mon–Fri); 120 (Sat/Sun)	Erfurter Bahn
RB 26	Weimar – Weimar Berkaer – Holzdorf – Bad Berka – Kranichfeld		60	Erfurter Bahn

== See also ==
- Rail transport in Germany
- Railway stations in Germany
