= Gößnitz =

- Town
- Coat of arms

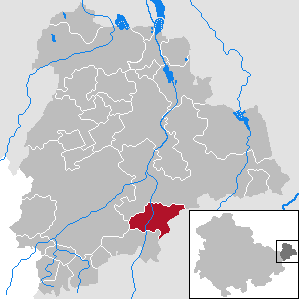
- Location of Gößnitz within Altenburger Land district
- Interactive map of Gößnitz
- Location within Germany Location within Thuringia
- Coordinates: 50°53′25″N 12°25′58″E
- Country: Germany
- State: Thuringia
- District: Altenburger Land
- Subdivisions: 6

Government
  - Mayor (2024–30): Patrick Albrecht

Area
  - Total: 14.07 km^{2} (5.43 sq mi)
- Elevation: 202 m (663 ft)

Population (2025-12-31)
  - Total: 3,413
  - Density: 242.6/km^{2} (628.3/sq mi)
- Time zone: UTC+01:00 (CET)
  - Summer (DST): UTC+02:00 (CEST)
- Postal codes: 04639
- Dialling codes: 034493
- Vehicle registration: ABG
- Website: www.goessnitz.de

Gößnitz (German pronunciation: [ˈɡœsnɪts]) is a town in the Altenburger Land district, in Thuringia, Germany. It is situated on the river Pleiße, 12 km south of Altenburg, and 20 km northwest of Zwickau. Gößnitz received its town charter in 1718. It is known for the railroad junction of the Leipzig-Hof railway connection and the Central-Germany connection (Dresden - Chemnitz - Gößnitz - Gera - Erfurt) and its station prides itself having Europe's longest platform, as well as the Gößnitz Open-Air. The town's greatest prosperity was at the time of industrialization; Hence Viktor Grimm's representative malt factory from 1889 still characterizes the cityscape.

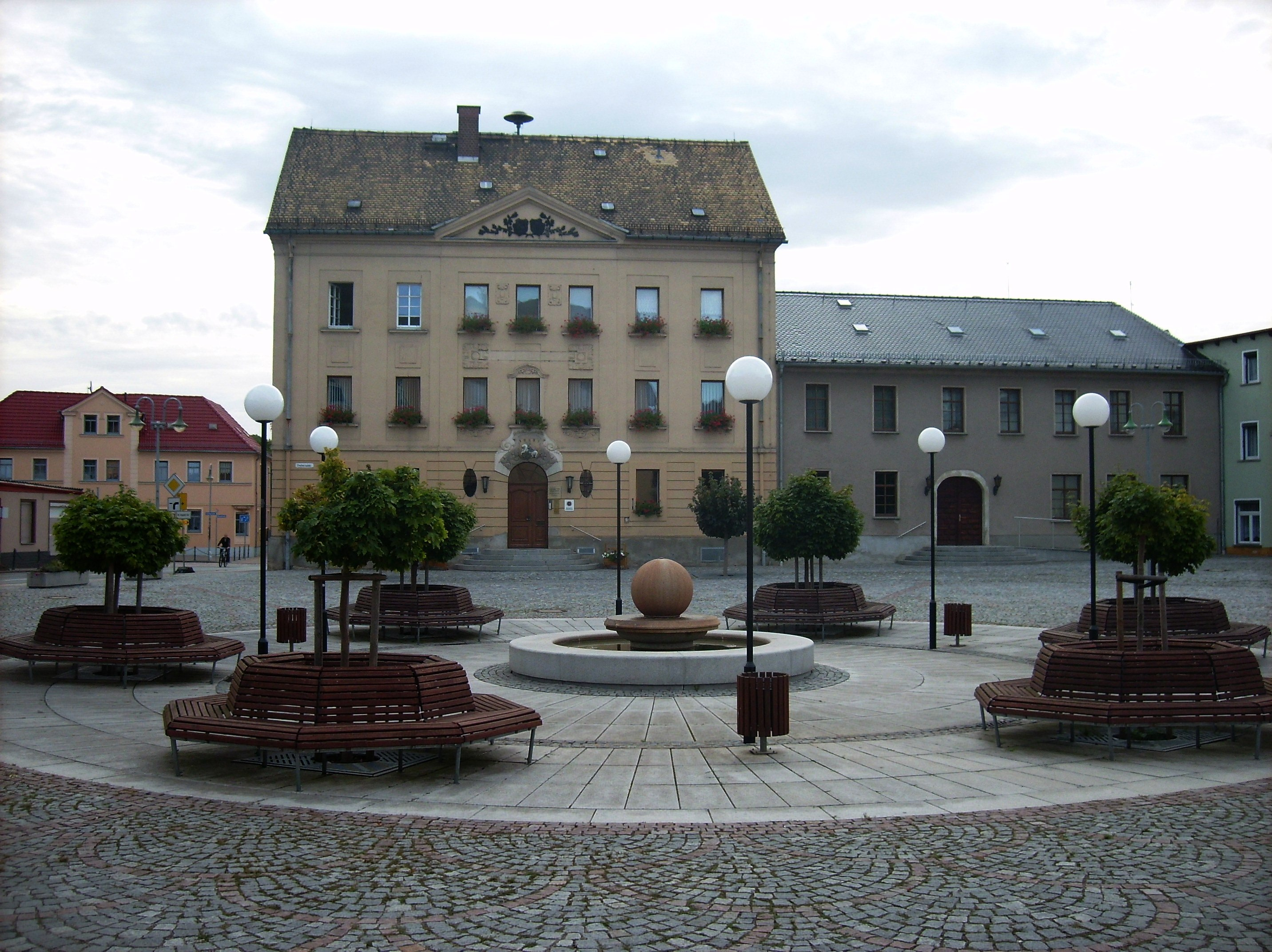
Gößnitz Town hall

== Sons and daughters of the city ==
- Hans Lungwitz (1881-1967), physician, philosopher and founder of psychobiology
- Joachim Reichmann (1923-1991), surgeon and university lecturer
