= Großheringen–Saalfeld railway =

Railway line in Germany

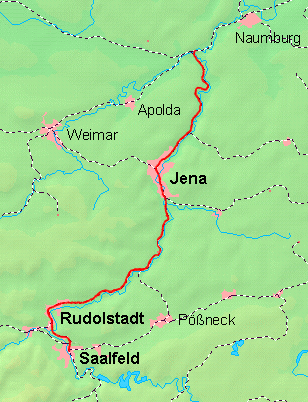

Overview
- Other name: Saale Railway
- Native name: Saalbahn
- Line number: 6304, 6305
- Locale: Thuringia, Germany
- Termini: Großheringen; Saalfeld

Service
- Route number: 560

Technical
- Line length: 74.83 km (46.50 mi)
- Track gauge: 1,435 mm (4 ft 8 1/2 in) standard gauge
- Minimum radius: 450 m (1,476 ft)
- Electrification: 15 kV/16.7 Hz AC catenary
- Maximum incline: 5.0%

The Großheringen–Saalfeld railway, also known as the Saalbahn ("Saale Railway"), is a 153 kilometre-long double-track main line in the German state of Thuringia. It connects the Thuringian Railway (German: Thüringer Bahn) at Großheringen (near Naumburg) with the Franconian Forest Railway (Frankenwaldbahn) at Saalfeld and is part of the north–south main line, Munich–Nuremberg–Halle / Leipzig–Berlin. It is electrified at 15 kV. 16.7 Hz.

== History ==
Local committees supporting the building of a railway line through the Saale valley date from 1850. In particular, the university town of Jena sought to connect to the emerging railway network. However, the conflicting interests of the affected Thuringian states for a long time prevented the implementation of these plans. The signing of a treaty of 8 October 1870 was signed between Saxe-Weimar-Eisenach, Saxe-Meiningen, Saxe-Altenburg and Schwarzburg-Rudolstadt allowed the granting of a concession on 3 April 1871 to the newly formed Saal Railway Company (Saal-Eisenbahn-Gesellschaft) to build and operate a railway line from Großheringen to Saalfeld via Jena and Rudolstadt. On 30 April 1874 the line was formally opened.

Three months later, on 14 August 1874, the Peppermint Railway (Pfefferminzbahn) was opened from Großheringen via Sömmerda to Straußfurt by the Nordhausen–Erfurt Railway Company.

At first the Saal line was only a route of regional importance, connecting at Großheringen with the Thuringian Railway from Bebra through Erfurt to Weissenfels. The north–south mainline at Weißenfels connected to Saalfeld via Gera (the Weißenfels–Zeitz and Leipzig–Probstzella lines). Economic difficulties and pressure from Prussia led to the railway being sold to the Prussian government in 1895 and becoming part of the Royal Railway Administration of Erfurt (Reichsbahndirektion Erfurt). In 1899, an eastern connection to the Thuringian railway was opened enabling Großheringen to be avoided. This meant that the route for services between Weissenfels and Saalfeld were now about 25 kilometres shorter than via Gera. As a result, the Saal line together with the Franconian Forest Railway became one of the major north–south routes in Germany. Between 1936 and 1939 Class SVT 137 high-speed streamlined diesel train sets connected Berlin to Munich or Stuttgart, on the Saal line, reaching an average speed on it of 95 km / h. Between 1935 and mid 1941, the line was electrified and thus connected to the electrified networks in central and southern Germany.

Five years later, all components of the electrical equipment and the second line were removed as part of reparations to the Soviet Union following World War II. Because of the division of Germany, the line lost its importance as a north–south runway during the next four decades, but remained important for the Saale valley with Saalfeld retaining a significant freight yard. The border crossing at Probstzella was one of eight lines used by interzone trains running to and from West Germany, using the Saal line. The northern section of the line to Camburg was re-electrified in 1967 and by 1981, the line had been rebuilt as a two-track line. Following German reunification in 1990, the Saale Railway has grown to be an important mainline railway connecting central Germany and southern Germany again. Its electrification was completed by 1995 and further work on its restoration was completed in 2005. New high-speed lines, due to be completed in 2017, are being built to the west of the Saale line via Erfurt: the Leipzig/Halle–Erfurt and the Erfurt–Nuremberg lines. These lines will release capacity on the Saale line for slower trains. As of 2007 an ICE takes 53 minutes to cover the 85-kilometer section between Naumburg and Saalfeld, corresponding to an average speed of 96 km/h.

== Route ==
The Saale line generally run on the western side of the Saale river. Although the line is built through a hilly region it contains no tunnels. The height difference between Großheringen and Saalfeld is 99 metres, the maximum grade is 0.5%. Since the route follows the winding course of the Saale, the smallest radius of a curve is 450 metres and the sections where the maximum speed of 120 km / h can be achieved are relatively short.
