= Leubatal =

Municipality in Thuringia, Germany

Coordinates: 50.717°N 12.050°E

Leubatal is a former Verwaltungsgemeinschaft ("collective municipality") in the district of Greiz, in Thuringia, Germany. The seat of the Verwaltungsgemeinschaft was in Hohenleuben. It was disbanded on 31 December 2013.

The Verwaltungsgemeinschaft Leubatal consisted of the following municipalities:

1. Hain
2. Hohenleuben
3. Hohenölsen
4. Kühdorf
5. Lunzig
6. Neugernsdorf
7. Schömberg
8. Steinsdorf
9. Teichwitz
10. Wildetaube
