= Greiz station =

Railway station in Greiz, Germany

Greiz
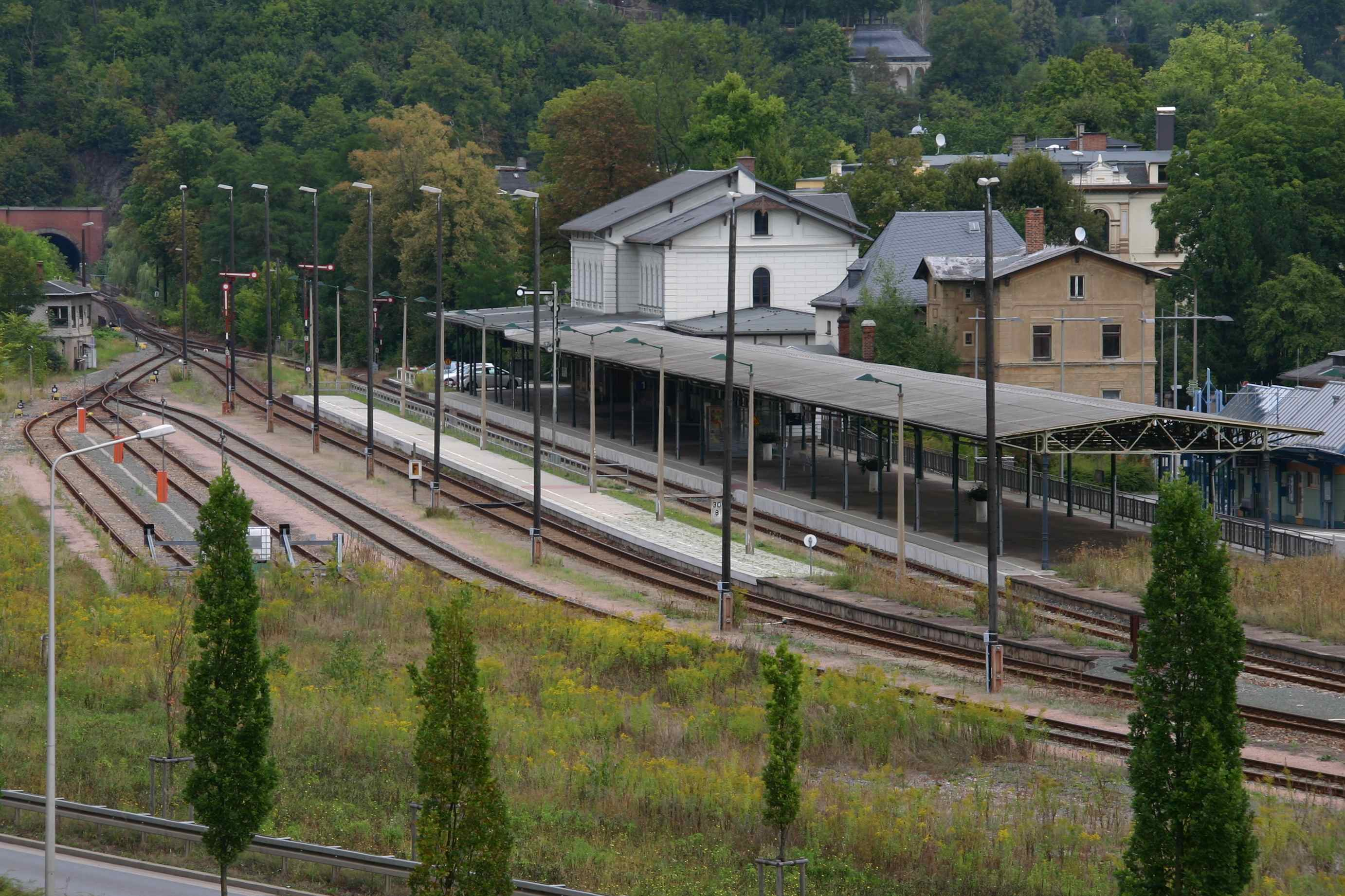
- Station tracks (2012)

General information
- Location: Poststr. 12, Greiz, Thuringia; Germany
- Coordinates: 50°39′09″N 12°11′38″E
- Lines: Gera Süd–Weischlitz (km 30.67); Neumark–Greiz (km 13.83)
- Platforms: 2

Construction
- Accessible: Yes

Other information
- Station code: 2254
- DS100 code: UGR
- IBNR: 8010140
- Category: 6
- Website: www.bahnhof.de

History
- Opened: 17 July 1875
- Former names: Greiz unt Bf

Services
| Preceding station | DB Regio Südost | Following station |
|---|---|---|
| Neumühle (Elster) towards Erfurt Hbf | RE 3 | Terminus |
| Preceding station | Vogtlandbahn | Following station |
| Neumühle (Elster) towards Gera Hbf | RB 4 | Greiz-Dölau towards Weischlitz |
Location
- Location within Thuringia Location within Germany Location within Europe

Greiz station is located in the town of Greiz in the German state of Thuringia. It is on the Gera Süd–Weischlitz railway, which is still in operation, and the Neumark–Greiz railway, which has been suspended since 1999, branches off there.

== History ==
Although a route through the Elster valley was considered for the first time in the 1830s, Greiz only received a rail connection in 1865 with the opening of the Neumark–Greiz railway by the private Greiz-Brunn Railway Company (Greiz-Brunner Eisenbahn-Gesellschaft). This line, however, ended in the Elster valley and was located far from the town centre. Therefore, a direct railway connection was desired in the 1860s. The Saxon-Thuringian Railway Company (Sächsisch-Thüringische Eisenbahngesellschaft) therefore received a concession for the construction of the Wolfsgefärth–Weischlitz railway.

The Wolfsgefärth–Greiz section was opened on 17 July 1875 and the station (originally called Greiz unt Bf— Greiz lower station) was thus a terminus for about six weeks, before the second section of line to Plauen lower station was opened on 8 September 1875.

Greiz, which was the capital of the Principality of the Reuss Elder Line, was the second largest station on the railway line. Originally equipped with two platforms and five tracks, the station was rebuilt from 1878 onwards, since the Greiz-Brunn Railway Company, which was purchased by Saxony in 1876, was extended to Greiz unt Bf. A total of 29 sets of points and 5.6 km of track were added.

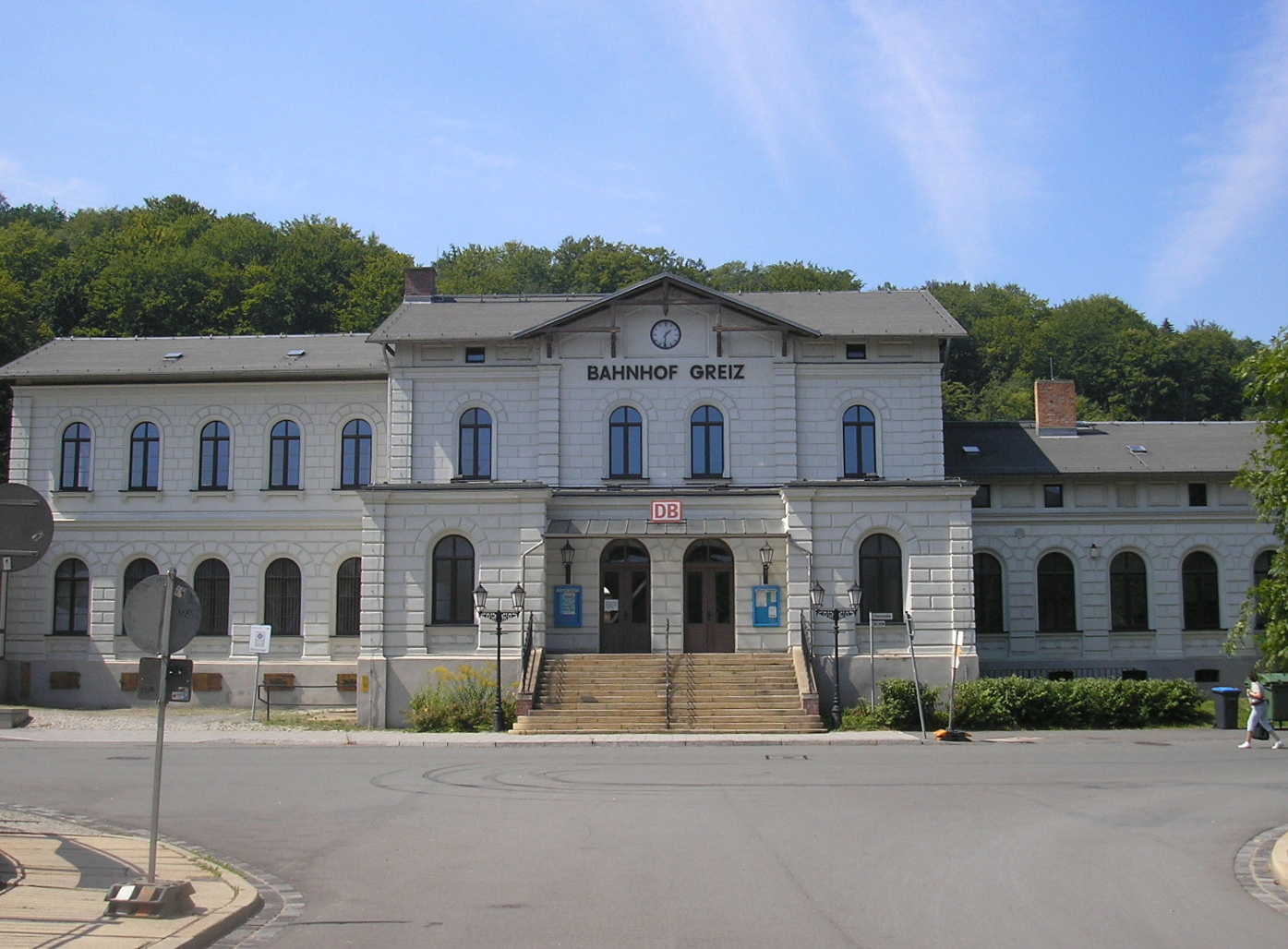
Entrance building

In the 1880s, further renovations and extensions were carried out, including a platform roof. After extensions carried out as late as the 1920s—for example an around 200 m-long new freight shed was built—the station remained largely unchanged until the 1990s.

Since the end of the Communist system in 1989/90 and the associated economic changes, the freight transport that had been important until 1990 has almost completely disappeared. The freight traffic to Neumark ended in 1995, passenger services still ran until 1997. In 1999, the Neumark–Greiz railway was closed and with the loss of its traffic, Greiz station lost further significance. The connections to nearly all freight tracks was cut during a renovation around 2000. In addition to three through tracks, there are now only two dead-end tracks in use. DB Regio, which operates passenger traffic on the Gera Süd–Greiz railway together with Vogtlandbahn, now operates on the dead-end tracks. The former station tracks were partly built over with the construction of federal highway 92. Since 2003, the new bus terminal has been located on the route of the Neumark railway line.

== Platforms ==
| Track | Length in m | Height in cm |
|---|---|---|
| 1 | 274 | 34 |
| 2 | 229 | 55 |

== Greiz locomotive depot ==
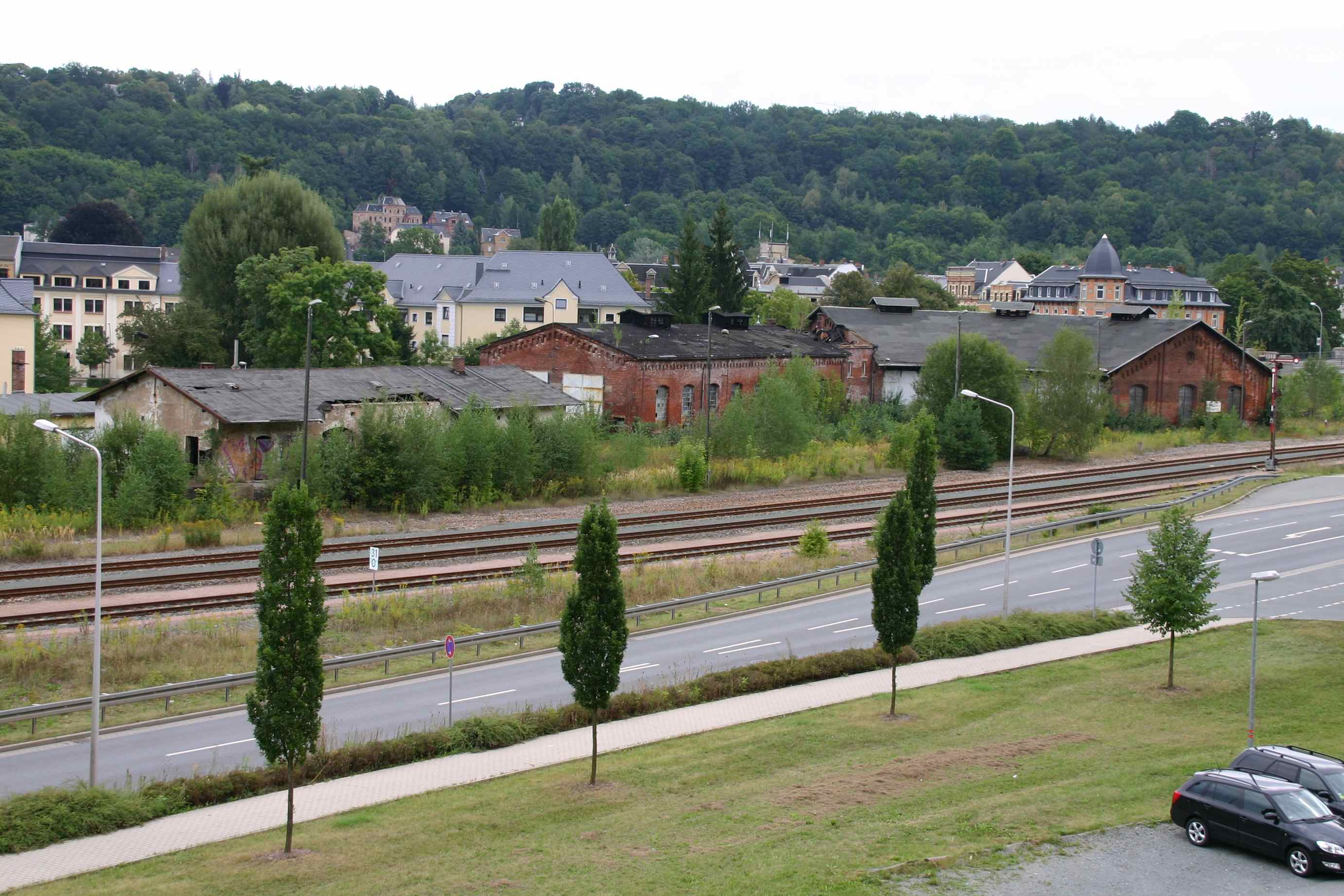
Locomotive depot (2012)

Track plan of Greiz station before 2000 rebuilding. Remaining tracks (2/18) are bold. Sources: Copious pictures and videos from 20th century.

In connection with the nationalisation of the Greiz-Brunn Railway Company and the associated extension of the line from Neumark to the "lower" station in Greiz, locomotive workshops were built here. In 1878, a Heizhaus (a roundhouse where locomotives were heated) and a turntable were opened; two stalls were added to the two-tracked rectangular shed in the following year. Since the storage facilities were not sufficient, another Heizhaus was built around 1890 next to the existing building in the form of a roundhouse with a 13 m turntable. Both buildings were connected by an intermediate building in 1912, while the roundhouse was extended by two stalls and the 13 m turntable was replaced by an 18 m turntable.

An independent Bahnbetriebswerk (locomotive depot, Bw) was originally established at Greiz station in 1937. However Greiz always remained a small Bw, larger locomotive repairs were therefore always carried out elsewhere.

On 1 January 1962, Bw Greiz was dissolved as an independent operation and subordinated to the Reichenbach locomotive depot, but on 30 September 1962, it was subordinated to the Gera locomotive depot instead. In the meantime, however, the staff again belonged to the Reichenbach locomotive depot.

The remaining rolling stock operations were finally closed in 1995. The buildings were torn down in 2015 and the site, which is owned by Deutsche Bahn AG, has since been cleared.

=== Locomotive use ===
In the beginning the only locomotives stationed in Greiz were the Greiz and Brunn (later designated in class I T) of the Greiz-Brunn Railway Company. After their retirement, class V T locomotives were based in Greiz. Later class XII H2 (later class 38.2–3) and XI HT (later class 94.19–21) locomotives were operated from Greiz.

It was only in the 1930s that classes locomotives from outside Saxony were stationed in Greiz. Although only an insignificant depot—mostly only older locomotives were stationed in Greiz—it had one of the first locomotives manufactured in 1932 as a brand-new class 86 locomotive.

Classes 38.2–3, 55.25–56, 58.10–21, 75.5, 91.3–18 and 94.19–21 were available at the end of the Second World War. On the other hand, after the war, class 38.10–40 were soon introduced and were used in Greiz until the 1960s.

Towards the end of 1963 numerous locomotives of class 58.10–21 were transferred to other depots, and were replaced by locomotives of classes 58.30 and 65.10. Since the 18 m turntable was too small for all locomotives of class 58, they were only able to use the shed tracks 4 and 6.

A change in traction began with the stationing of class VT 2.09 diesel railcars in 1968. By around 1970 there were for the first time diesel locomotives of classes V 60, V 100, V 180 and V 200 stationed here. The traction change was completed in December 1975, when the last class 50 locomotives were withdrawn.

== Passenger services ==
Greiz station is served on a two-hour cycle by Vogtlandbahn services between Gera and Greiz, continuing via Plauen to Weischlitz. These are operated with Siemens Desiro Classic (class 642) diesel multiple units. DB Regio also operates class 612 sets between Greiz and Erfurt via Gera on a two-hour cycle. The two services between them provide an hourly service on the Greiz–Gera route. The DB Regio trains do not stop in Wünschendorf Nord, due to the lack of stop-request buttons in the class 612 sets, while the trains of the Vogtlandbahn only stop on request at this halt and in Neumühle/Elster. In addition, on some weekends in the autumn, a heritage steam train runs under the name of Elstertal-Express between Gera and Cheb. In the 2016 timetable, Greiz station is served by the following services:

| Line | Route | Interval (min) |
|---|---|---|
| RE 3 | Erfurt – Weimar – Jena-Göschwitz – Hermsdorf-Klosterlausnitz – Gera – Greiz | 120 |
| RB 4 | Gera – Wünschendorf Nord – Greiz – Elsterberg – Weischlitz – Plauen (Vogtl)/Adorf (Vogtl) | 120 |

== Sources ==
- Rettig, Wilfried (2001). Die Eisenbahnen im Vogtland (in German). Vol. 1: Entwicklung, Hauptstrecken, Fahrzeuge, Bahnbetriebswerke und Hochbauten. Freiburg: EK-Verlag. ISBN 3-88255-686-2.
- Rettig, Wilfried (2006). Die Elstertalbahn – Die Geschichte der Eisenbahn zwischen Gera, Greiz, Plauen und Weischlitz (in German). Freiburg: EK-Verlag. ISBN 3-88255-588-2.
- Kühne, Klaus-Jürgen (2011). Bahnbetriebswerke der DDR — 1949–1993 (in German). Stuttgart: transpress-Verlag. ISBN 978-3-613-71401-4.
