= Neumark–Greiz railway =

Railway line in Germany

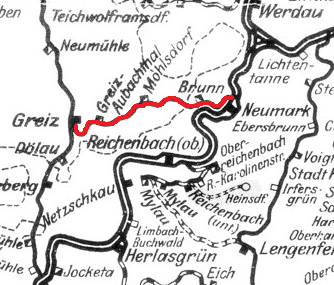

Overview
- Line number: 6655
- Locale: Saxony and Thuringia, Germany

Service
- Route number: 543

Technical
- Line length: 13.825 km (8.590 mi)
- Track gauge: 1,435 mm (4 ft 8 1/2 in) standard gauge
- Minimum radius: 227 m (745 ft)
- Maximum incline: 1.7%

The Neumark–Greiz railway was a branch line in the German states of Saxony and Thuringia, which was built by the Greiz-Brunn Railway Company. It ran from Neumark in the Vogtland district of Saxony to Greiz in Thuringia, but was closed in 1999.

== History ==
As early as 1839, manufacturers in Greiz had sought a connection to the then projected Saxon-Bavarian Railway (Leipzig–Hof railway). Ultimately, this line was built entirely on Saxon territory, although an alignment through the Elster valley would have made the major bridges (the Göltzsch and Elster Viaducts) in Vogtland unnecessary. Saxony also had no interest in a subsequent railway in the Elster valley, because it did not want any competition with its own lines.

In 1855, an Eisenbahn-Bauverein (railway building association) was established in Greiz to build a rail connection to the Saxon-Bavarian Railway. A treaty between the Principality of Reuss Elder Line and the Kingdom of Saxony was signed on 3 November 1863 as the basis for its construction. On 30 June 1864, the Greiz-Brunn Railway Company (German: Greiz-Brunner Eisenbahn-Gesellschaft) was formed.

=== Construction ===
On 17 September 1864, construction began on the line. The starting point of the new line was Neumark station and initially the line ran along the tracks of the Saxon-Bavarian Railway. The line branched off from the main line to the newly built Brunn station in order to continue through the Aubach valley to Greiz-Aubachtal station, which was the end of the line. The line was built fairly quickly, so that the line was completed in October 1865. On 21 October 1865 the line was opened with a procession; regular train services were recorded on 23 October 1865.

On 1 January 1876, the Greiz-Brunn Railway Company was nationalised and the Neumark–Greiz line became part of the Royal Saxon State Railways. Immediately thereafter, construction began on a short connecting line to the Elster Valley Railway. A 200 metre long tunnel was excavated immediately west of Greiz-Aubachtal station in order to connect with the Elster Valley Railway running from the south into Greiz station. On 15 October 1879, the two kilometre long rail link was put into operation.

The last development of the line was the building of a separate track between Neumark and Brunn, which was opened on 19 May 1886.

In 1924, the line was officially reclassified from a main line to a branch line.

=== Decline ===
After the political changes in 1989/1990 the number of passengers on the line continued to fall. Passenger services were finally close at the timetable change on 31 May 1997, freight operations were discontinued at the end of 1995. The line was formally closed on 28 February 1999. A little later, the connection between the tracks of the Saxon-Franconian trunk line and the Neumark-Greiz line were removed.
