= Gera Süd–Weischlitz railway =

Railway line in Germany

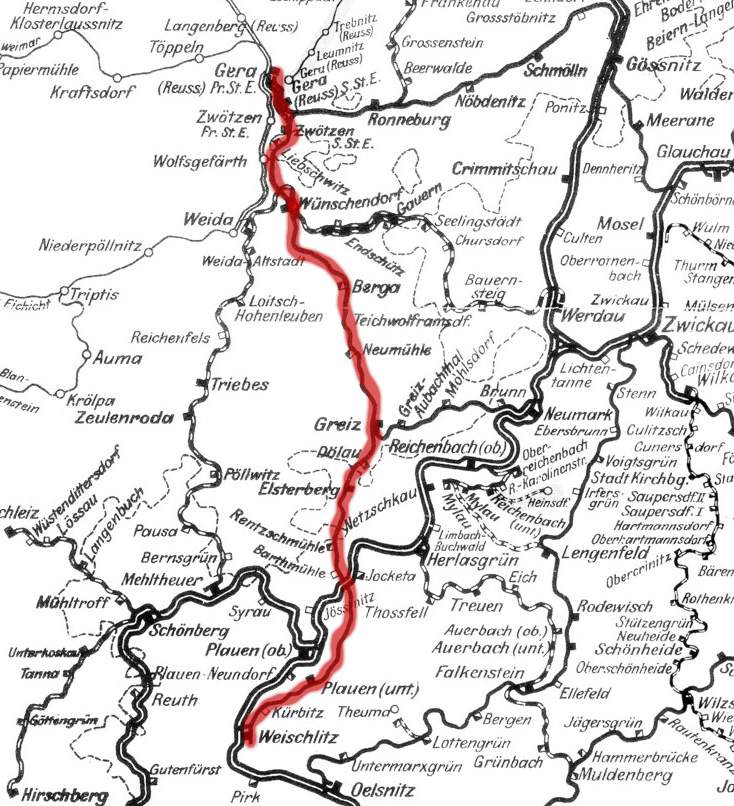
- Section of the 1902 route map of Saxony

Overview
- Native name: Elstertalbahn
- Line number: 6269
- Locale: Saxony and Thuringia, Germany

Service
- Route number: 541

Technical
- Line length: 60.38 km (37.52 mi)
- Track gauge: 1,435 mm (4 ft 8 1/2 in) standard gauge
- Minimum radius: 275 m (902 ft)
- Operating speed: 80 km/h (50 mph) (maximum)
- Maximum incline: 0.9%

The Gera Süd–Weischlitz railway (also known as the Elstertalbahn—"Elster Valley Railway") is a main railway line in the German federal states of Thuringia and Saxony, which was originally built and operated by the Saxon-Thuringian Railway Company (Sächsisch-Thüringische Eisenbahngesellschaft). It runs in the valley of the White Elster (Weiße Elster) from Gera via Greiz and Plauen to Weischlitz.

== History ==
The original starting point of the line was at Wolfsgefärth station on the existing Prussian Leipzig–Probstzella railway. The section from Wolfsgefärth to Greiz went into operation on 17 July 1875. The second section from Greiz to Plauen lower station (Plauen unterer Bahnhof) was opened on 8 September and the last section was opened to Weischlitz on 20 September of the same year, where it connected with the Plauen–Cheb railway. However, the construction of the many bridges and the eight tunnels put the Saxon-Thuringian Railway Company into financial difficulties in 1876, so the line had to be sold to the Royal Saxon State Railways (Königlich Sächsische Staatseisenbahnen).

The Royal Saxon State Railways opened a separate route from Gera (Reuß) Sächs Stsb station (now Gera Süd) via Gera Ost and Gera-Liebschwitz to Wünschendorf on 1 December 1892. The original connection to the Prussian Wolfsgefärth station was abandoned at the same time. The new line required an elaborate new bridge over the White Elster and its floodplains at Liebschwitz.

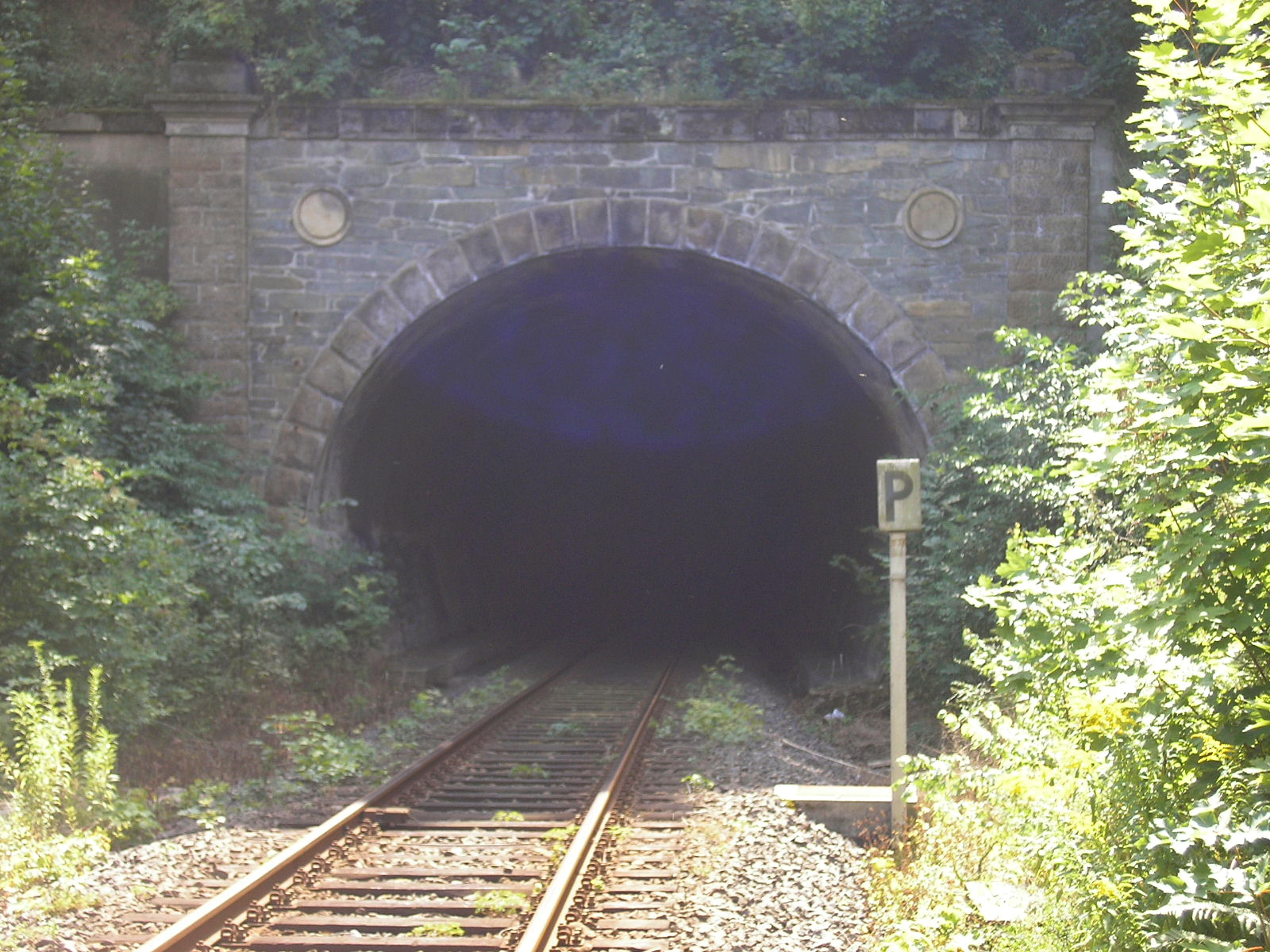
North portal of the Schlossberg tunnels in Greiz with a cross-section that allows for two tracks

The so-called "lower railway" (untere Bahn) was designed for the implementation of two-track operation throughout (tunnels, bridge abutments). In fact, the second track was installed only on the Gera–Wünschendorf and Plauen (Vogtl) Chrieschwitz–Plauen lower station sections. After the end of the Second World War it was dismantled.

The Elster Viaduct (Elstertalbrücke) on the heavily used line from Gößnitz to Plauen was blown up by the German army on 16 April 1945. In the autumn of 1945, it was possible to resume continuous train operations after the removal of the rubble. After the Second World War the line was of great importance for freight transport, since the towns on the White Elster were important industrial locations. There were also some long-distance rail passenger services to Czechoslovakia, since until the 1970s, the more easterly "upper railway" via Werdau and Reichenbach was partly only single-track due to the dismantling in the post war period and was therefore overloaded. Analogous to this was the use of the parallel Werdau–Mehltheuer railway as a relief route, but for connections to southern Germany. After the Reichenbach–Plauen line was restored to two tracks throughout, the utilisation of the lower railway also decreased. At the beginning of the 1980s, the operation of the Ex 68 Karola once again provided a high-quality long-distance connection in the form of diesel multiple units. This was made possible by the conversion from 1979 of the locomotive-hauled Vindobona trains from class VT 18.16 diesel multiple units. From 1981/82 only freight and local passenger traffic was operated. Typically class 112 (later class 202) locomotives were used in passenger traffic and class 120 (later class 220) locomotives were used in freight traffic.

After German Reunification in 1990, the importance of the route decreased. In the 1992/93 timetable, only one pair of Eilzug (semi-fast) trains were scheduled on the Greiz–Erfurt(–Fulda) and on the Gera–Adorf (Vogtl) routes. The freight traffic shrank to a few trains on the Greiz–Dölau route and some through trains to the Czech Republic. The branching Greiz–Neumark line was closed and dismantled in 1999.

Passenger services have been operated jointly by Vogtlandbahn and Deutsche Bahn since 9 December 2012. Vogtlandbahn operates services between Weischlitz and Gera, while Deutsche Bahn operates on the Elsterberg–Gera section.

There is a two-hourly cycle along the entire route with trains crossing in Elsterberg on the hour, while between Greiz and Gera trains run hourly, with trains crossing in Berga just before the half hour. Special excursions with steam locomotives run between Gera and Cheb, usually on weekends and holidays in the autumn.

Freight transport is normally restricted to trains between Gera and Greiz-Dölau, as well as transfers between Weischlitz and Plauen-Chrieschwitz. The wagons are hauled between Gera and Greiz-Dölau by locomotives of classes 203, 261 or 294. The deliveries to the sidings in the Plauen municipal area (Zellwolle, Plauen lower station, Chrieschwitz) are hauled by class 261 locomotives (as of May 2013). These wagons are detached in Plauen ob Bf and transferred to the line to Cheb ("upper railway") and reverse in Weischlitz.

Construction of the new Plauen (Vogtl) Mitte halt began on 24 February 2014 as part of the ÖPNV/SPNV-Verknüpfungsstelle Reichenbacher Straße (Reichenbacher Straße link public transport project). This is intended to create a better connection with the Plauen tram network. During the construction the line between Plauen-Chrieschwitz and Weischlitz was blockaded until 2 November, so that buses replaced trains on this section. It was opened on 7 September 2015. Plauen (Vogtl) unt Bf and Plauen (Vogtl) Zellwolle halt are no longer served.

Due to the need to renovate the Liebschwitz Viaduct (speed limit of 10 km/h). DB examined various options for traffic towards Weischlitz. In 2016, DB Netz AG launched a project for the restoration of the link to the former Wolfsgefärth station (called Gera-Röppisch since 1953; not to be confused with the new halt of Wolfsgefährt, which has been located further south since 2000) that existed until 1892, but instead of restoring the former station, only a junction was built. With its commissioning, the Saxon State Railways route via Gera Ost, Gera-Liebschwitz and the viaduct over the Elster, which had existed since 1892, has now been closed. Since then, the trains have been running from Wolfsgefärth over the largely parallel line of the Leipzig–Probstzella railway to Gera. The parallel section of the Elster Valley Railway was taken out of service at the same time and the trains now run from Wolfsgefärth via the Leipzig–Probstzella railway to Gera.

== Route description ==
=== Route ===
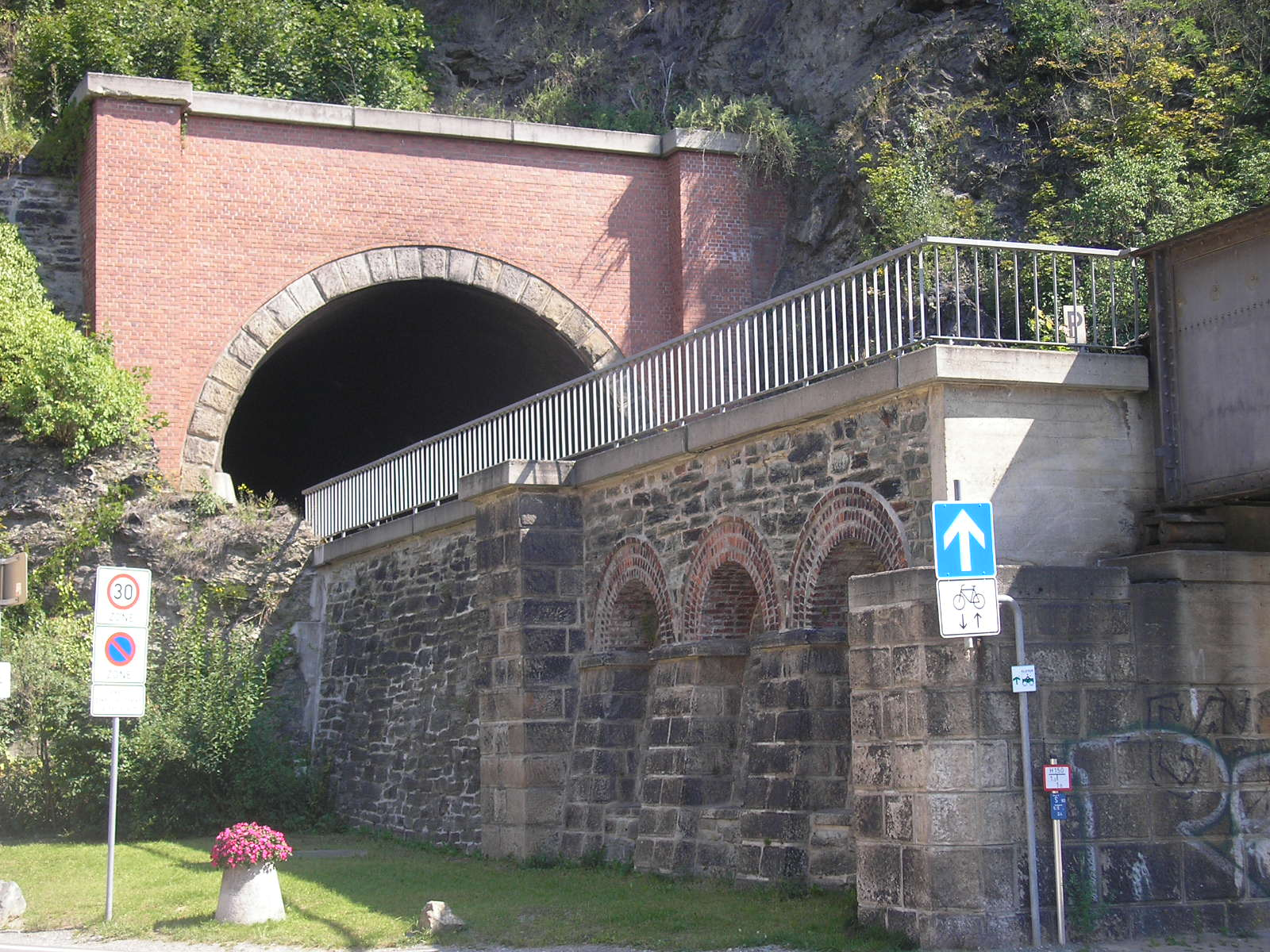
South portal of the Schlossberg tunnel in Greiz

Trains leave Gera Süd station on a two-track railway and passed under the southeast tangent road to a junction, where the line to Saalfeld runs to the south and the line to Gößnitz branches off to the east. The now closed section of the Elster Valley Railway branched off to the southeast and passed to the east of the district of Zwötzen and crossed the White Elster to the west of Liebschwitz and came within a few metres of the Saalfeld line in the area of today's Wolfsgefärth junction, where the current Elster Valley Railway starts. The decommissioned Weida–Wünschendorf–Werdau railway crosses the Elster Valley Railway near the Wünschendorf dolomite works and the two lines converge at Wünschendorf station. Both lines leave the town and the Wünschendorf basin in parallel and reach the narrow and densely wooded valley of the Elster, with the Elster Valley Railway changing to the western river bank. After passing the quartzite quarry, the Werdau–Mehltheuer railway curves eastwards into the Fuchsbach valley, while the Elster Valley Railway runs through a tunnel for the first time and crosses the river again. In Berga, it crosses federal highway 175 and south of the town it first crosses alluvial farmland, until the river is crosses again and the 264 metre-long Rüßdorf Tunnel shortens the route. From Lehnamühle the route runs through the Greiz-Werdauer Wald landscape as far as Neumühle station and to a double crossing of the river to Neumühle Tunnel. On the way to Greiz, the river is crossed twice, and this section has one of the most noteworthy works of civil engineering—as shown by its popularity with photographers—the Schlossberg Tunnel under the Oberes Schloss (Upper Palace) in Greiz.

On the second half of the route, the White Elster is crossed a total of fourteen times and it parallels Bundesstraße 92 closely as far as Elsterberg. At the exit from Greiz station, the disused line to Neumark branched off to the east and at the same time the line passes under old steel bridge of the Tannendorfstraße. After the confluence of the Göltzsch with the White Elster, the line crosses the Elster twice and runs through the Dölau (or Rothenthal) tunnel, before reaching Greiz-Dölau station. Between Greiz-Dölau and Elsterberg, the line remains on the eastern bank of the Elster and crosses the state border into Saxony, before crossing the river a total of six times and through two tunnel on the subsequent section to Barthmühle. Among the most striking points on the line is the following section under the Elster Viaduct, which carried the Leipzig–Hof railway. Immediately afterwards the line runs to the confluence of the Trieb and passes the Pöhl dam, which lies 800 metre to the east. The Barthmühle tunnel as well as four other Elster bridges follow until it reaches the industrial city of Plauen with its stations of Chrieschwitz, Mitte, Unterer Bahnhof and Zellwolle, although only the new Mitte station is now served. After leaving the city, the line is approached from the north by the Plauen–Cheb railway, which finally meets the Elster Valley Railway in Kürbitz and the lines run parallel for the remaining two kilometres to Weischlitz.

=== Operating points ===
Gera Süd (50°52′16″N 12°04′35″E)

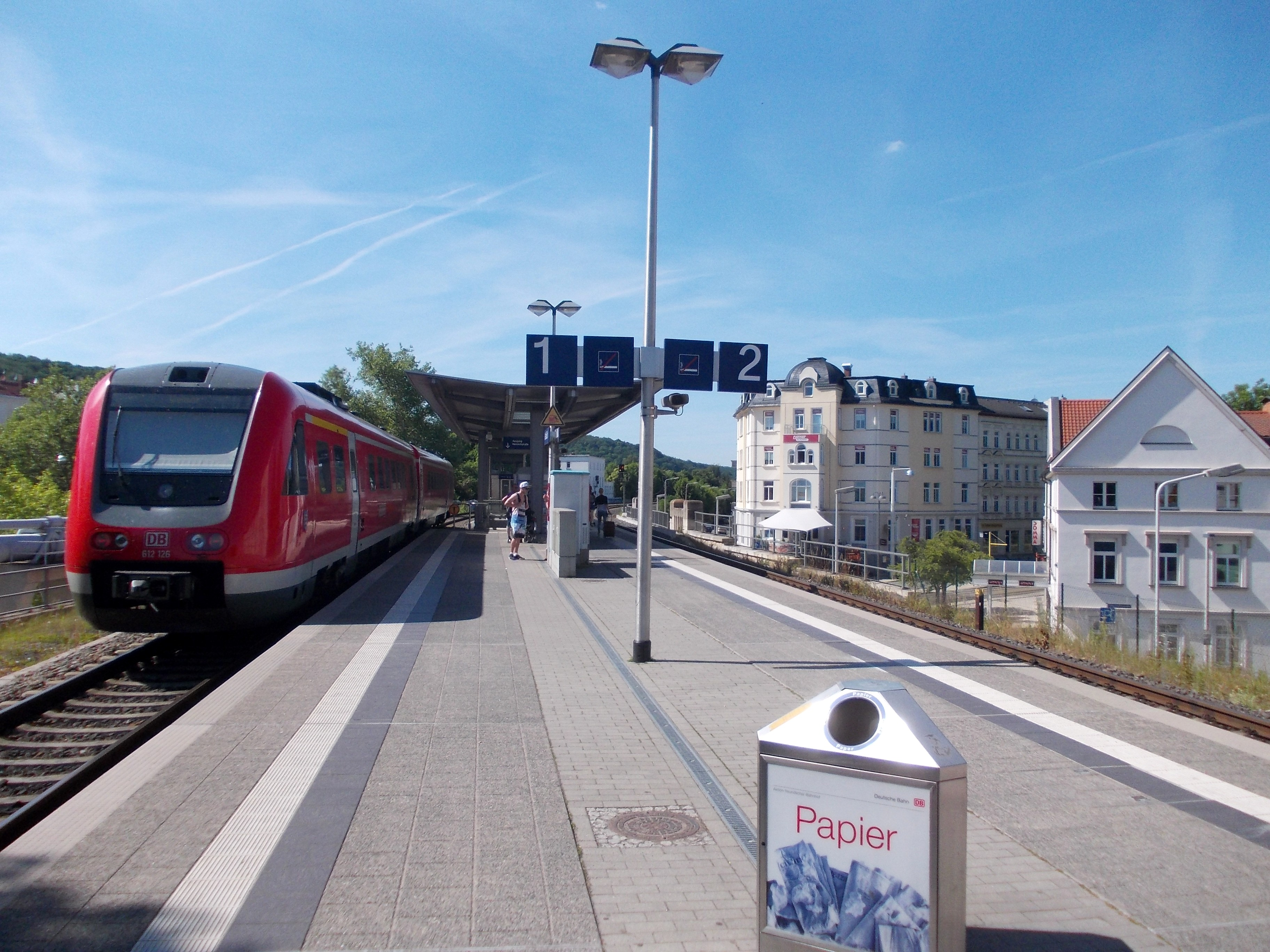
Gera Süd halt

Gera Süd (south) station was opened on 1 June 1886 as Gera-Pforten freight yard at the junction of the Leipzig–Probstzella and Gößnitz–Gera railways. On 1 December 1892, Royal Saxon State Railways (Königlich Sächsische Staatseisenbahnen) opened the Gera Süd–Wünschendorf section as an independent route for the Gera Süd–Weischlitz railway.

The station in the Gera district of Pforten thus became the first station of the Royal Saxon State Railways in Gera. With the dedication to the station in 1893, the station received an entrance building made of red brick. The station had the following names:

- until 1896: Gera–Pforten (in 1901 this name was given to the newly opened station of the narrow gauge Gera-Pforten–Wuitz-Mumsdorf railway)
- until 1911: Gera (Reuß) S. St. E.
- until 1920: Gera (Reuß) Sächs Stb
- until 1923: Gera (Reuß) Süd
- since 1923: Gera Süd

Since the numerous level crossings were a hindrance to road traffic, the tracks were raised between 1906 and 1911. The current station building was built on Sachsenplatz in Gera in 1911. In 1922, the station was transferred from the Eisenbahndirektion (railway division) of Dresden to the Eisenbahndirektion Erfurt. The signal boxes were gradually abandoned and demolished from 2005. Today, the station has only the functions of a halt (Haltepunkt). Since 24 October 2016, trains run towards Weischlitz via Wolfsgefärth over the Leipzig–Probstzella railway from Gera.

Gera Süd Gbf (freight yard, 50°52′11″N 12°04′42″E)

Directly south of the station is the closed Gera Süd Gbf freight yard. It was opened on 1 July 1897. Its tracks were raised between 1906 and 1911. Gera Süd Gbf went out of operations on 1 June 1992. It was subsequently dismantled.

Gera Ost (50°50′58″N 12°05′34″E)

The halt of Gera Ost (east) was opened on 1 December 1892 as Zwötzen and was reclassified as a station (Bahnhof) in 1905. The station had the following names:

- until 1900: Zwötzen
- until 1911: Zwötzen S. St. E.
- until 1920: Zwötzen Sächs Stb
- until 1931: Zwötzen Ost
- since 1931: Gera Ost

The station has a red brick entrance building, as well as freight sheds, workshops and a Bahnmeisterei (track supervisor's office). It was reclassified as a halt in 1972. With the relocation of the rail operations on the Gera Süd–Wolfsgefärth section to the parallel Leipzig–Probstzella railway, Gera Ost halt was closed on 24 October 2016.

Gera-Liebschwitz (50°50′19″N 12°04′51″E)

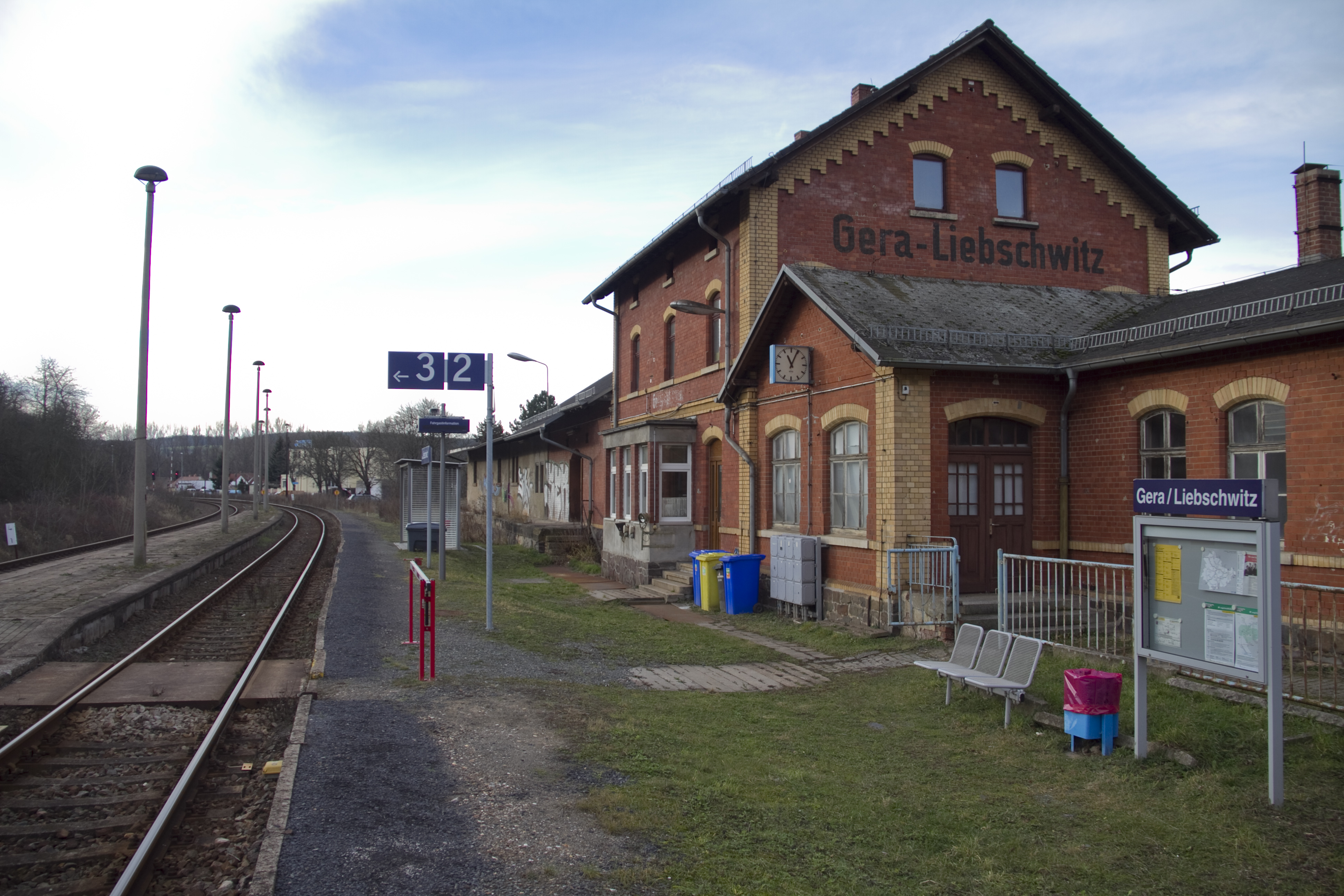
Gera-Liebschwitz station

Gera-Liebschwitz station was opened on 1 December 1892 as a halt and reclassified as a station in 1905. The entrance building and the work shops are made of red brick. The station had the following names:

- until 1918: Liebschwitz
- until 1953: Liebschwitz (Elster)
- since 1953: Gera-Liebschwitz

With the relocation of the rail operations on the Gera Süd–Wolfsgefärth section to the parallel Leipzig–Probstzella railway, Bahnhof Gera-Liebschwitz was closed on 24 October 2016.

Wünschendorf (Elster) Nord (50°49′03″N 12°04′41″E)

The halt of Wünschendorf (Elster) Nord (north) was opened on 1 June 1909 as the halt of Meilitz. After the incorporation of the town into Wünschendorf/Elster, it was renamed Wünschendorf (Elster) Nord in 1953.

Wünschendorf (Elster) (50°47′51″N 12°05′52″E)

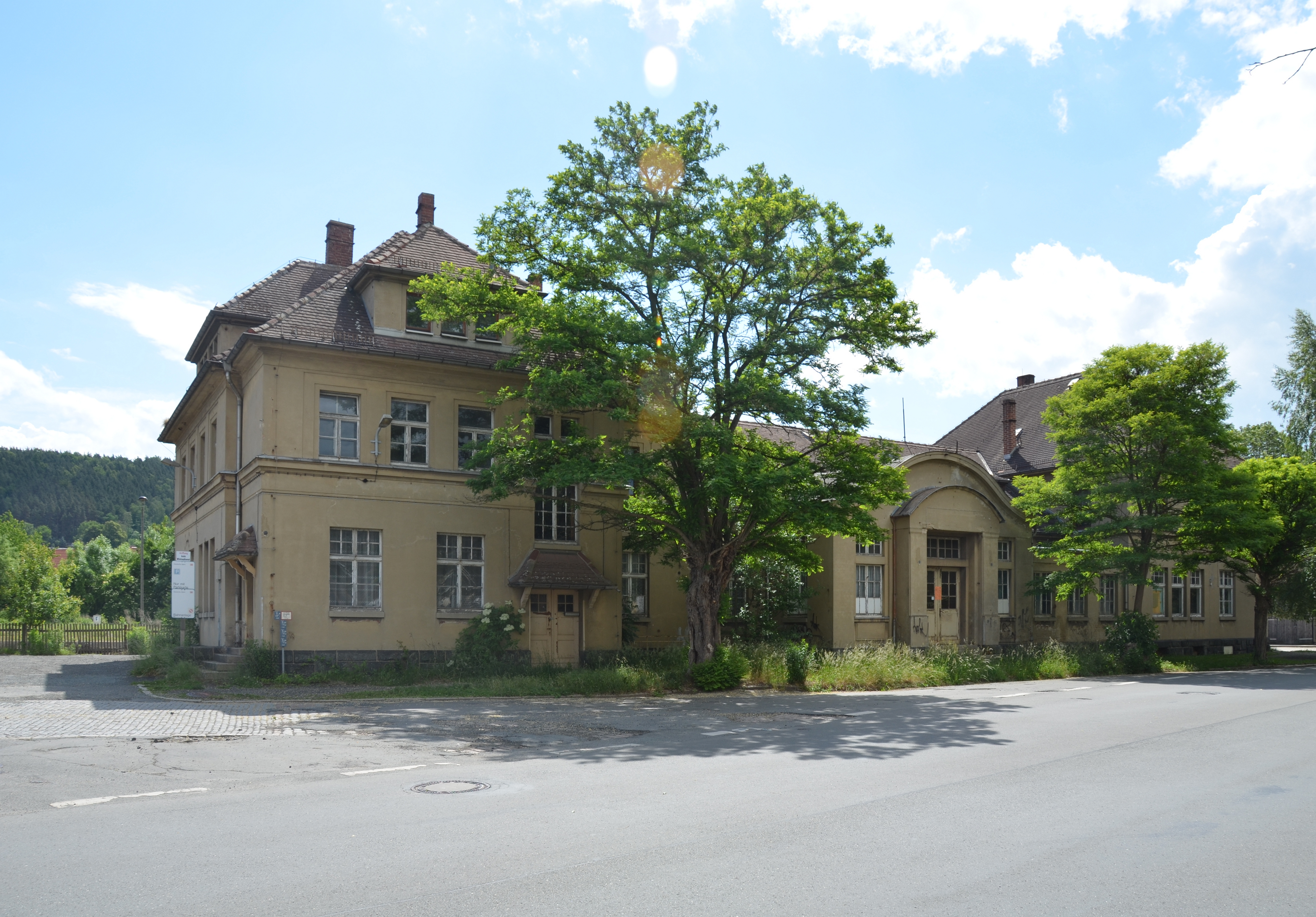
Wünschendorf (Elster) station

The halt of Wünschendorf was opened on 17 July 1875 with the Gera Süd–Weischlitz railway. With the opening of the Werdau–Wünschendorf–Weida section of the Werdau–Mehltheuer railway on 29 August 1876, it reclassified as a station on 1 August 1884. It has had the following names:

- until 1908: Wünschendorf
- until 1911: Wünschendorf a.d. Elster
- since 1911: Wünschendorf (Elster)

The present entrance building dates back to 1916. Other buildings are freight and locomotive sheds, workshops and two signal boxes.

Since the Wünschendorf (Elster)–Weida section was closed on 1 May 1997 and the Werdau–Wünschendorf (Elster) section was closed on 15 November 2000, Wünschendorf station has only been a stop on the Gera Süd–Weischlitz railway.

Berga (Elster) (50°44′50″N 12°09′32″E)

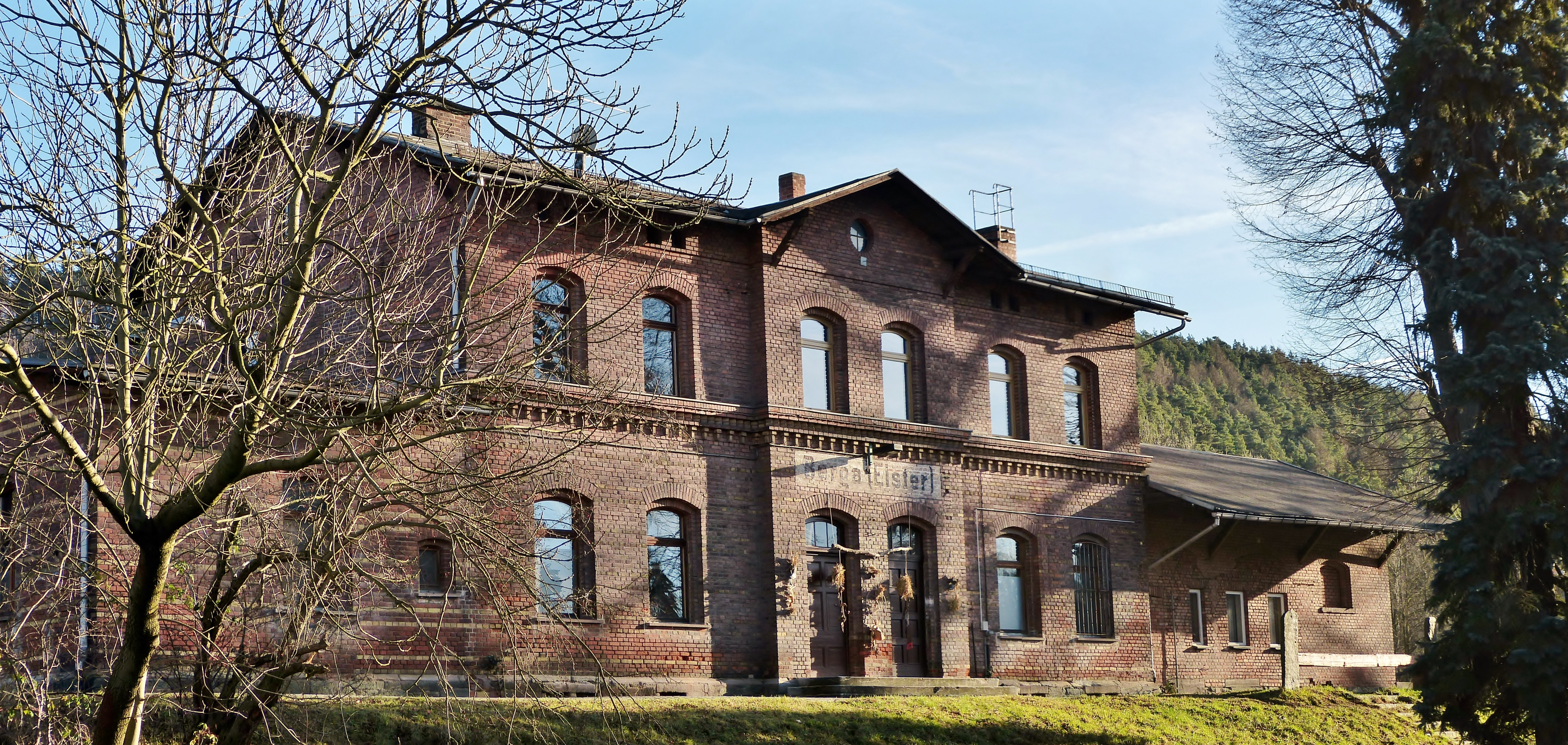
Berga (Elster) station

Berga (Elster) station was opened as a halt on 17 July 1875 and it was reclassified as a station in 1905. It has had the following names:

- until 1896: Berga
- until 1911: Berga a.d. Elster
- since 1911: Berga (Elster)

The entrance building of the station was built of red brick. The other significant buildings are the Bahnmeisterei and two signal boxes.

Neumühle (Elster) (50°42′08″N 12°10′13″E)

Neumühle (Elster) station was opened on 17 July 1875 as the halt of Neumühle and it was reclassified as a station in 1905. It received its present name in 1922. After the original entrance building was transferred to Wildetaube in 1891, the station received its current red brick building. The station also has a wooden waiting room and a goods shed.

Greiz (50°39′09″N 12°11′38″E)

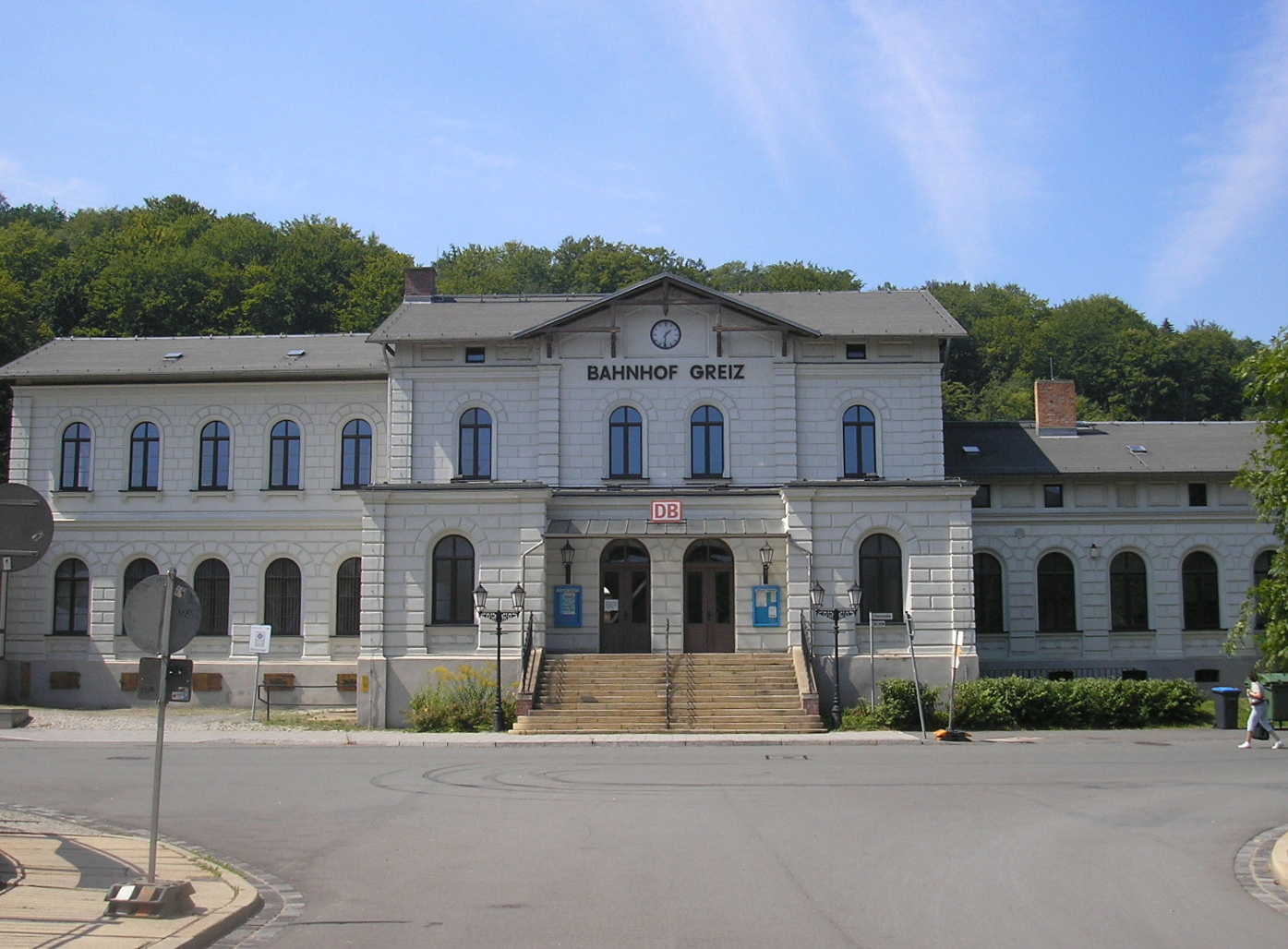
Entrance building of Greiz station

Greiz station was opened on 17 July 1875 under the name of Greiz unt Bf (lower station) with the Wolfsgefärth–Greiz section of the Gera Süd–Weischlitz railway. Until the opening of the section to the lower station in Plauen on 8 September 1875 it was a terminus. Greiz was the capital of the Principality of the Reuss Elder Line and the station became the second largest station on the line. After the purchase of the Neumark–Greiz railway of the Greiz-Brunn Railway Company (Greiz-Brunner Eisenbahn-Gesellschaft) by the Kingdom of Saxony, this line was extended in 1876 from Greiz ob Bf (upper station) to Greiz unt Bf, making the station into a junction station. In 1879, the station was renamed Greiz Bahnhof (Greiz station) and it was designated as Greiz in 1897. Parts of the station were rebuilt around 1880 and 1920.

After passenger traffic on the line to Neumark ended in 1997, the line was closed in 1999. Since then Greiz station has only been a through station. The freight shed was demolished in 2001. This was followed by the demolition of the coal and engine sheds in 2015.

Greiz-Dölau (50°37′48″N 12°11′05″E)

Greiz-Dölau station was opened on 1 May 1893 as the halt of Dölau and it was reclassified as a station in 1905. Since its opening, the station has had a small entrance building. It has had the following names:

- until 1898: Dölau
- until 1916: Dölau bei Greiz
- until 1922: Dölau (Reuß)
- since 1922: Greiz-Dölau

Greiz-Dölau is the last station in Thuringia towards Weischlitz.

Elsterberg (50°36′49″N 12°10′03″E)

Elsterberg station was opened on 8 September 1875. It is the first station in Saxony towards Weischlitz. The station in the north of the town has, besides an entrance building, a staff residence, a freight shed and two signal boxes.

Elsterberg Kunstseidenwerk (50°36′17″N 12°09′34″E)

The halt of Elsterberg Kunstseidenwerk was opened on 1 December 1949 as the halt of Elsterberg Spinnfaser in the vicinity of the VEB Clara Zetkin rayon factory in the south of the town. It was renamed Elsterberg Kunstseidenwerk (rayon factory) in 1956.

Rentzschmühle (50°34′29″N 12°09′28″E)

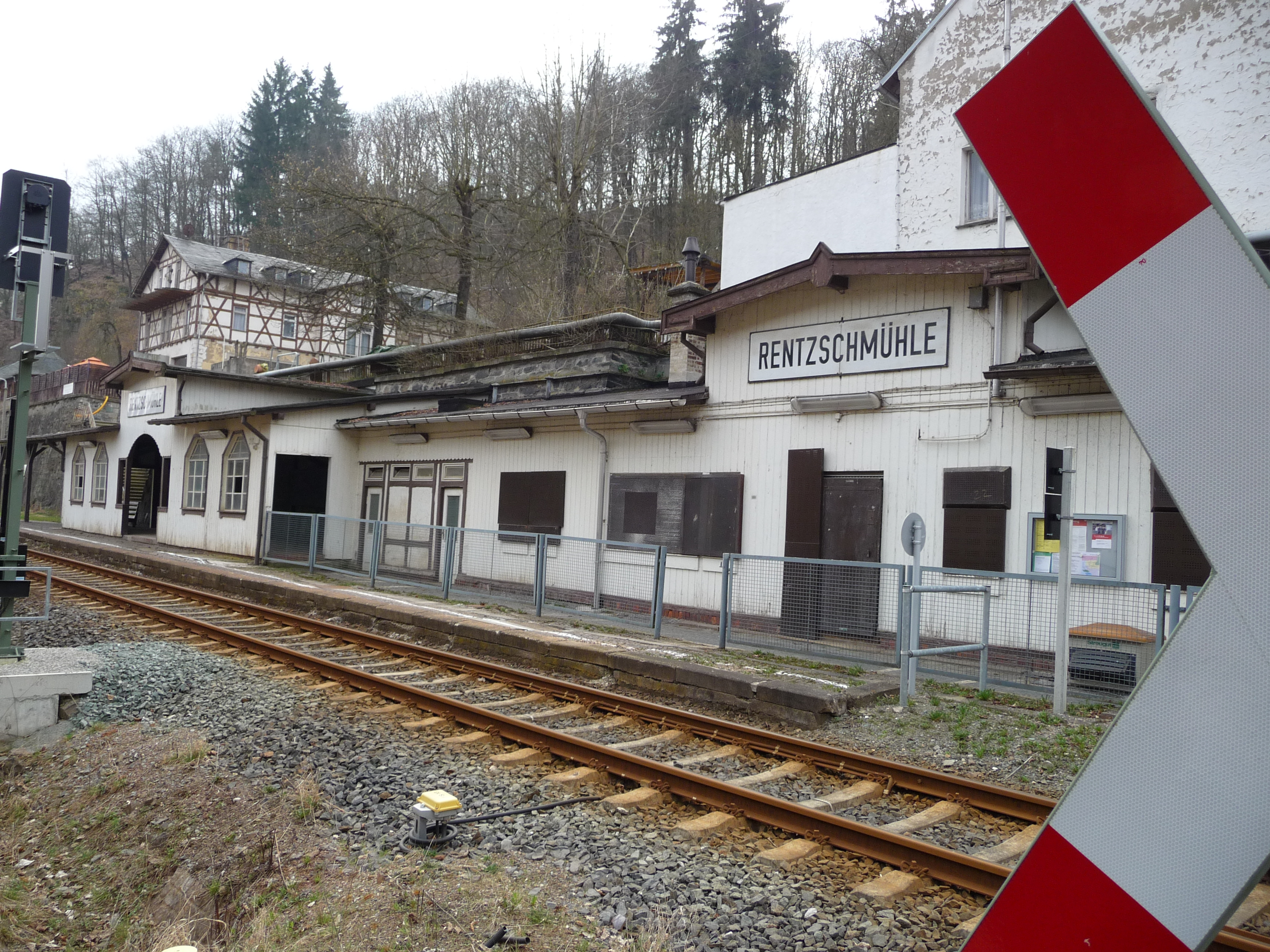
Rentzschmühle station

Rentzschmühle station was opened on 8 September 1875 as a halt and it was reclassified as a station in 1905. The station of the settlement of Rentzschmühle, which is part of the Saxon municipality of Pöhl, lies in the valley of the White Elster on the edge of the Thuringian village of Cossengrün. The wooden entrance building is surrounded by several half-timbered houses.

Barthmühle (50°33′28″N 12°09′49″E)

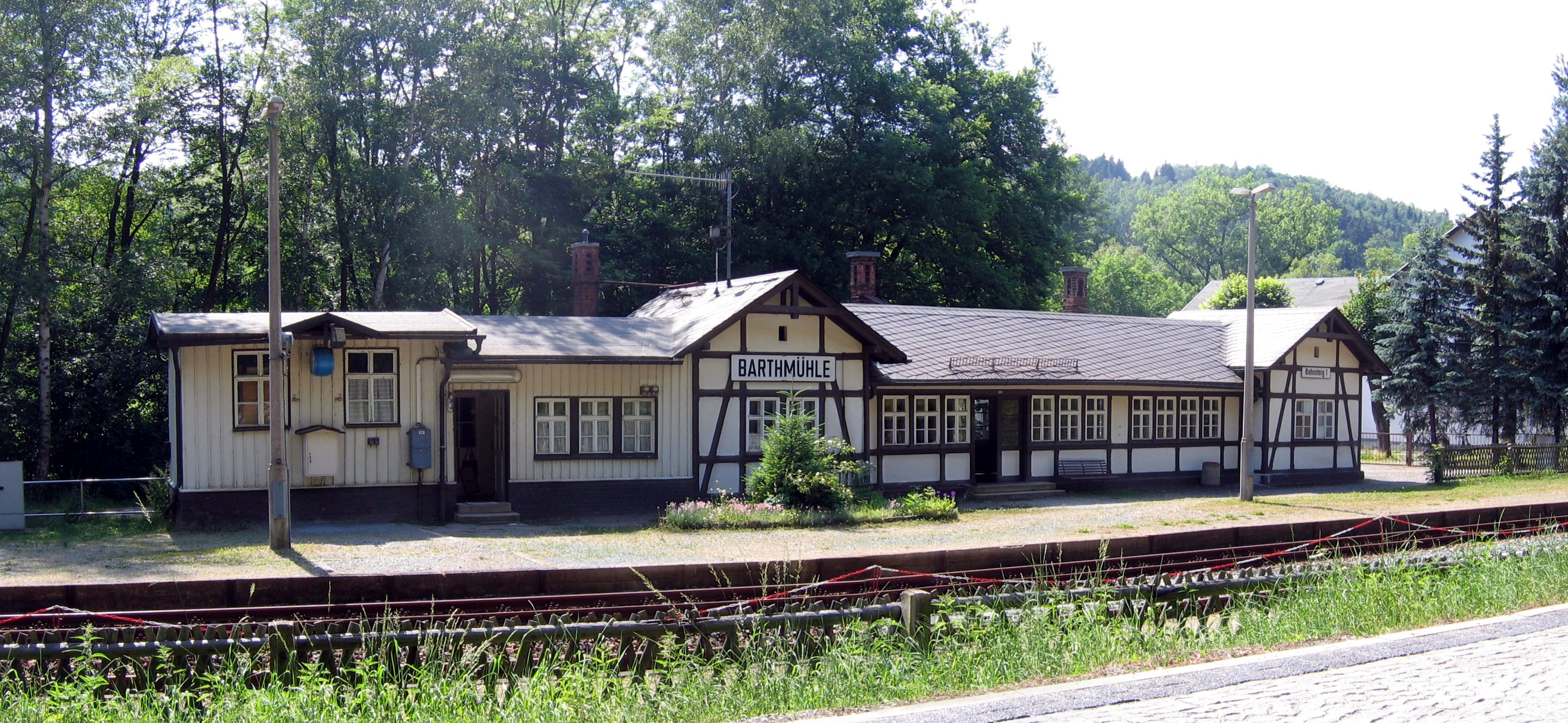
Barthmühle station

Barthmühle station was opened on 15 July 1879 as a halt and it was reclassified as a station in 1905. The station is located in the district of Barthmühle of the municipality of Pöhl. The Leipzig–Hof railway crosses the Gera–Weischlitz railway south of the station on the Elster Viaduct. There is a halt on the latter railway in the town of Jocketa, which lies only a few kilometres to the east of Barthmühle station. The station has a timber-framed entrance building.

Plauen (Vogtl) Chrieschwitz (50°30′13″N 12°09′29″E)

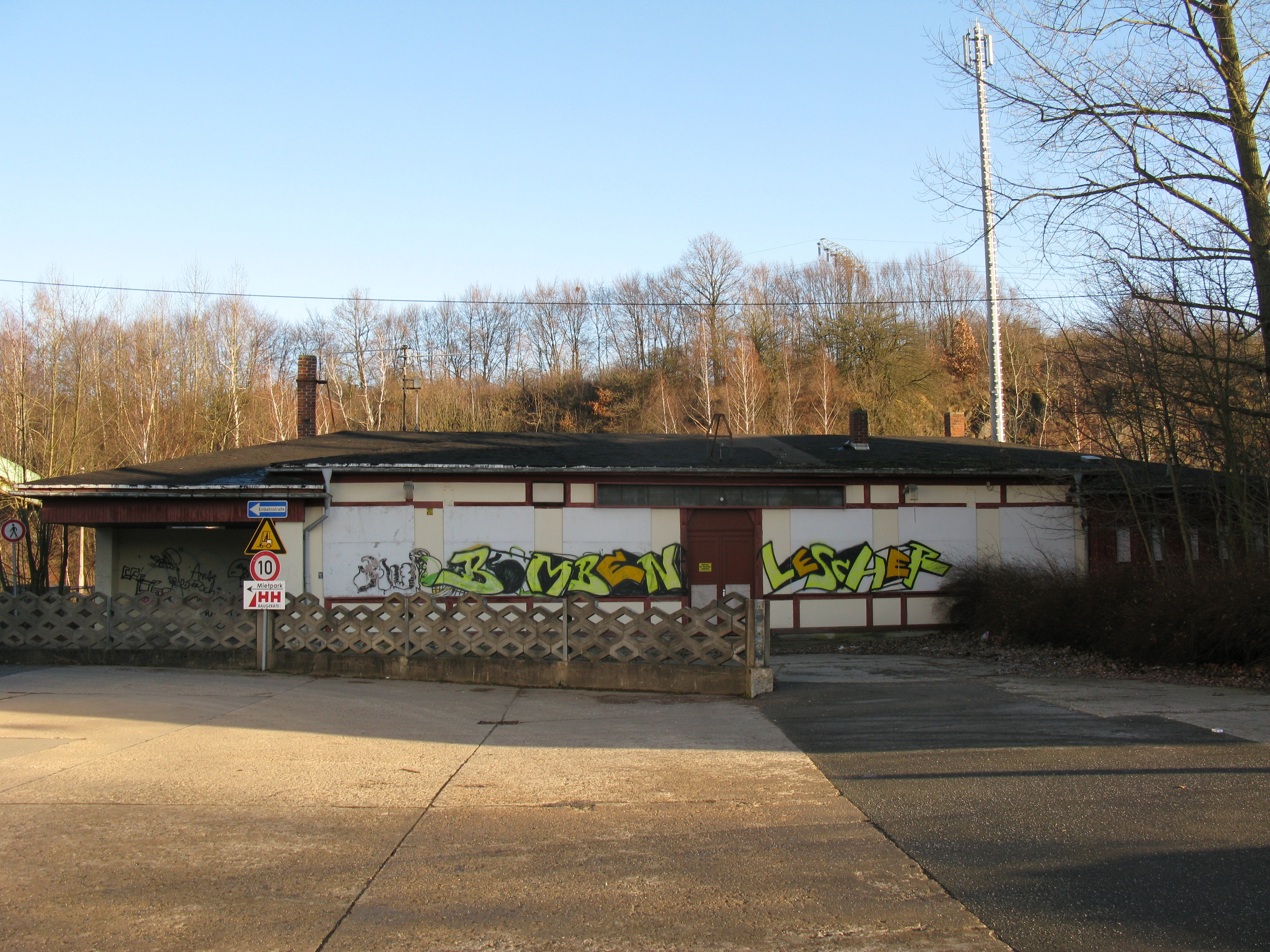
Entrance building of Chrieschwitz station

Plauen (Vogtl) Chrieschwitz station was opened on 1 June 1923 with the commissioning of the Lottengrün–Plauen railway. This line from the east was subsequently extended from the station to provide two tracks to Plauen lower station. In 1946, the second track was dismantled to provide reparations. The line to Lottengrün was dismantled at the beginning of 1970. In the area that was released, a pallet yard was built during the building of the Plattenbau district of Plauen-Chrieschwitz. In addition, a number of factories were also connected to the station with sidings; only the siding to a steel construction company is currently operated.

The second station track was dismantled and the station was reduced to a halt in 2004. The bridge, built in 1984, had to be closed in 2006 due to the state of the structure. Since the platforms of the halt can only be reached by way of the bridge, its closure meant the abandonment of the halt.

Plauen (Vogtl) Mitte (50°29′33″N 12°08′51″E)

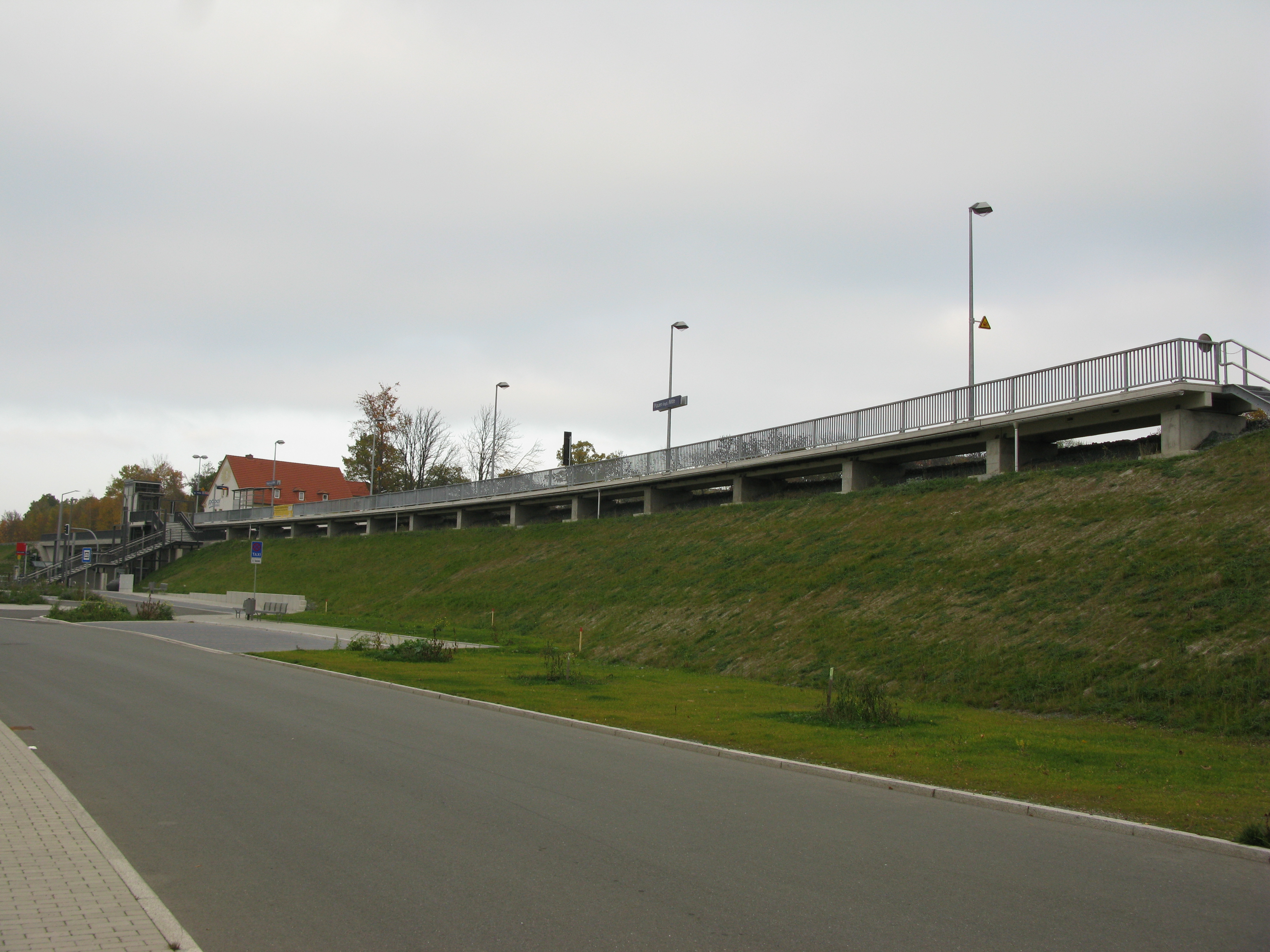
Plauen (Vogtl) Mitte halt

The halt of Plauen (Vogtl) Mitte was opened on 7 September 2015 as part of the ÖPNV/SPNV-Verknüpfungsstelle Reichenbacher Straße (Reichenbacher Straße link public transport project) in the centre of Plauen. It serves to improve the link the line of the Plauen tramway. With the opening of the station, the subsequent stations of Plauen (Vogtl) unt Bf and Plauen (Vogtl) Zellwolle were closed.

Plauen (Vogtl) unt Bf (50°29′11″N 12°07′45″E)

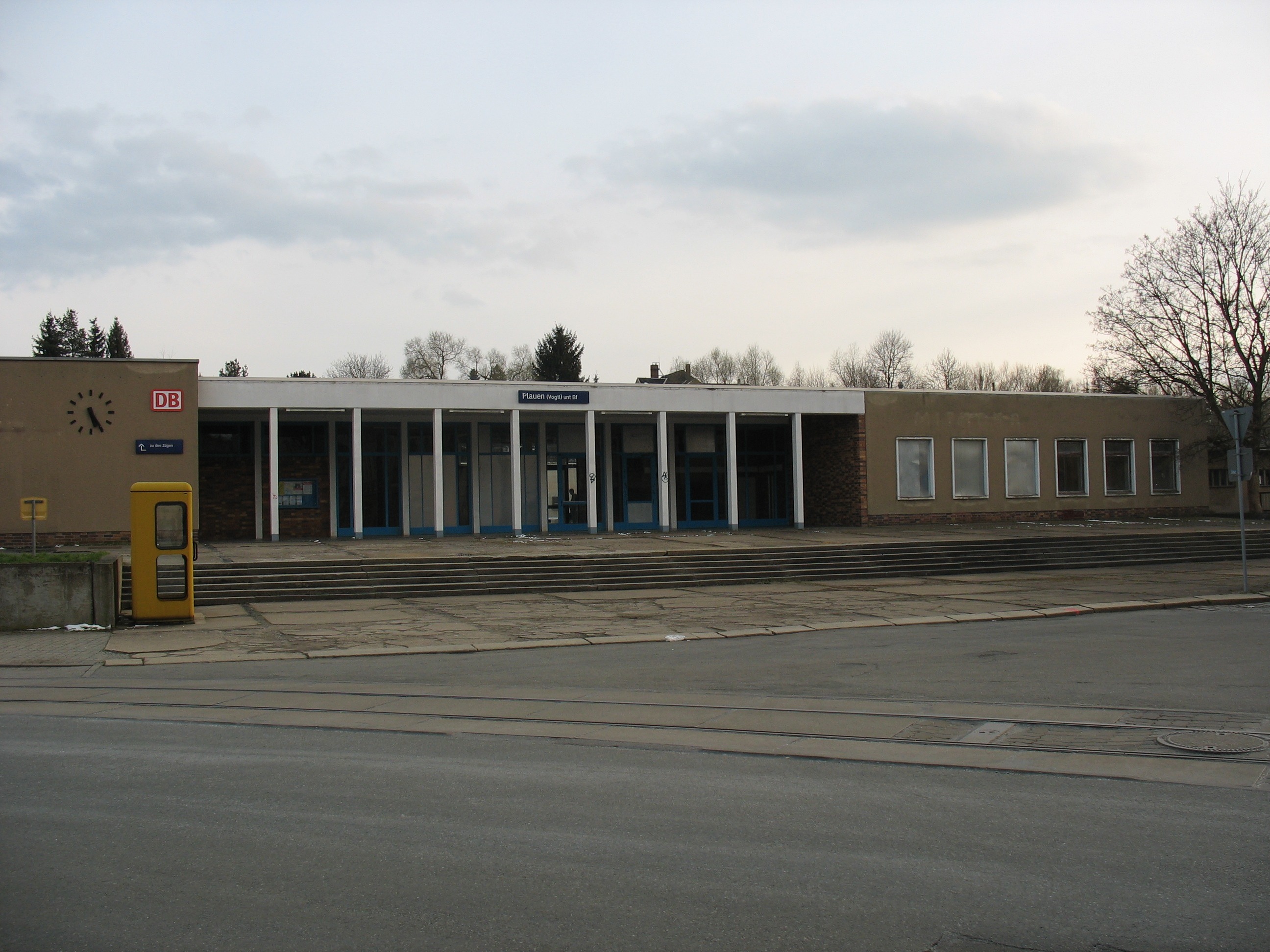
Plauen (Vogtl) unt Bf

Bahnhof Plauen (Vogtl) unt Bf (Plauen (Vogtlland) lower station), which was opened on 8 September 1875, was the second station of the city after the Bahnhof Plauen (Vogtl) ob Bf (upper station). It was necessary, because the variation of height within the city of Plauen meant that it was not possible to connect the railway running in the White Elster valley to the upper station. On 1 July 1911, the station which had previously abbreviated as Plauen i.V. unt Bf, was given its current abbreviation of Plauen (Vogtl) unt Bf, both meaning Plauen in Vogtlland lower station. The services of the Lottengrün–Plauen railway that ran onto the Elster Valley Railway at Plauen-Chrieschwitz ended in Plauen (Vogtl) unt Bf between 1923 and 1972.

After the entrance building of the station was completely destroyed on 21 March 1945 at the end of the Second World War, the station only received a new building in 1967. The station was served until 6 September 2015 by hourly regional trains on line VB 6 of the Vogtlandbahn (Weischlitz–Gera). Since the opening of the halt of Plauen (Vogtl) Mitte on 7 September 2015, Bahnhof Plauen (Vogtl) unt Bf is no longer served by scheduled services.

Plauen (Vogtl) Zellwolle (50°28′50″N 12°06′35″E)

The halt of Plauen (Vogtl) Zellwolle was opened on 1 December 1949. It was equipped with a small unadorned entrance building, which is no longer preserved. After the modernisation of the station, it was equipped with a modern waiting room. Since the opening of the Plauen (Vogtl) Mitte halt on 7 September 2015 the Plauen (Vogtl) Zellwolle halt is no longer served by scheduled services.

Kürbitz (50°27′46″N 12°04′11″E)

The halt of Haltepunkt Kürbitz was put in operation in 1875 along with the Gera-Pforten–Weischlitz railway, but there was no platform on the tracks of the Plauen–Cheb line (then called the Plauen–Eger line). After the dismantling of the second track, a platform was built on the released land for the Plauen–Cheb line in 1951.

Weischlitz (50°26′55″N 12°03′38″E)

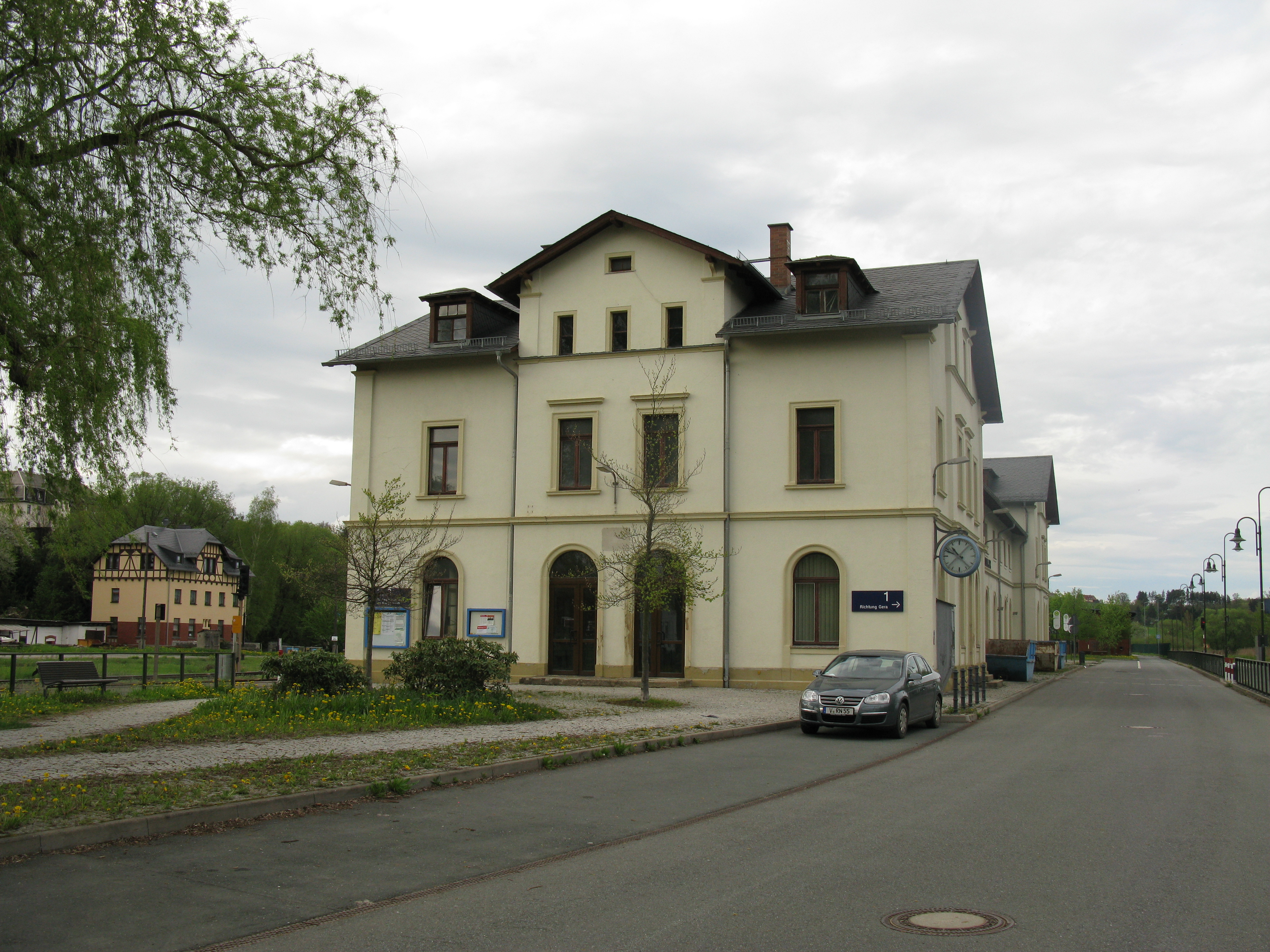
Weischlitz station

From the beginning Weischlitz station was designed to be integrated with the Gera Süd–Weischlitz railway of the privately built Saxon-Thuringian Railway. The private railway built its facilities east of the existing facilities. It opened its last section from Plauen unt Bf to Weischlitz on 20 September 1875.

Even after the Saxon-Thuringian railway company had been taken over by the government of Saxony, nothing changed in the method of operations. The trains to Wolfsgefährth began and ended in the eastern part of the station.

Around 1900, major reconstruction took place, after which the station remained essentially unchanged until the end of the Second World War. After the war, the tracks in the station were reduced by the dismantling of the second track for reparations.

The station now has eight tracks, six of which are on the west side. There is also the loading track, which is the only remaining track used for freight traffic.

The locomotive station, built by the Saxon-Thuringian railway company, with a heritage-listed rectangular Heizhaus (a roundhouse where locomotives were heated) and a turntable, built later, remained in operation until the 1970s.

== Rolling stock ==
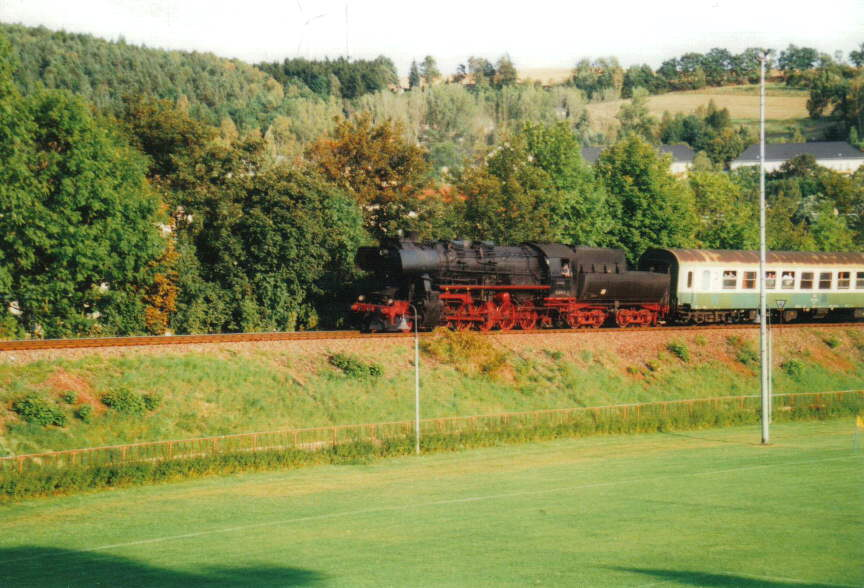
Special excursions are not unusual on the Elster Valley Railway

In the 1990s, in addition to class 202 there were also locomotives of classes 219 and 232, which mostly hauled UIC-Z coaches, but sometimes also the UIC-X express coaches of the former Bundesbahn. Siemens Desiro Classic sets first appeared on the line in 2000. Meanwhile, the Regio-Shuttle RS 1 sets have been removed. Class 612 were introduced into operation at the 2012 timetables change.
