= UHK =

UHK may refer to:

- Hermsdorf-Klosterlausnitz station, a railway station in Thuringia, Germany (station code: UHK)
- Union Handballklub Krems, a handball club in Austria
- University of Hong Kong, a public university in Hong Kong (official acronym is HKU)
- University of Hradec Králové, a public university in eastern Bohemia, Czech Republic
- University Hospital Kerry, hospital in Tralee, Ireland
