= Neugernsdorf =

- Ortsteil of Langenwetzendorf
- Interactive map of Neugernsdorf
- Location within Germany Location within Thuringia
- Coordinates: 50°42′32″N 12°7′48″E
- Country: Germany
- State: Thuringia
- District: Greiz
- Municipality: Langenwetzendorf

Area
  - Total: 3.78 km^{2} (1.46 sq mi)
- Elevation: 310 m (1,020 ft)

Population (2012-12-31)
  - Total: 161
  - Density: 42.6/km^{2} (110/sq mi)
- Time zone: UTC+01:00 (CET)
  - Summer (DST): UTC+02:00 (CEST)
- Postal codes: 07980
- Dialling codes: 036625

Neugernsdorf is a village and a former municipality in the district of Greiz, in Thuringia, Germany. Since 31 December 2013, it is part of the municipality Langenwetzendorf.
