= Lunzig =

- Ortsteil of Langenwetzendorf
- Interactive map of Lunzig
- Location within Germany Location within Thuringia
- Coordinates: 50°42′49″N 12°5′33″E
- Country: Germany
- State: Thuringia
- District: Greiz
- Municipality: Langenwetzendorf

Area
  - Total: 3.76 km^{2} (1.45 sq mi)
- Elevation: 350 m (1,150 ft)

Population (2012-12-31)
  - Total: 159
  - Density: 42.3/km^{2} (110/sq mi)
- Time zone: UTC+01:00 (CET)
  - Summer (DST): UTC+02:00 (CEST)
- Postal codes: 07980
- Dialling codes: 036625
- Vehicle registration: GRZ
- Website: www.lunzig.de

Lunzig is a village and a former municipality in the district of Greiz, in Thuringia, Germany. Since 31 December 2013, it is part of the municipality Langenwetzendorf.
