= Steinsdorf =

- Ortsteil of Weida
- Interactive map of Steinsdorf
- Location within Germany Location within Thuringia
- Coordinates: 50°45′N 12°3′E
- Country: Germany
- State: Thuringia
- District: Greiz
- Town: Weida

Area
  - Total: 12.41 km^{2} (4.79 sq mi)
- Elevation: 330 m (1,080 ft)

Population (2012-12-31)
  - Total: 678
  - Density: 54.6/km^{2} (141/sq mi)
- Time zone: UTC+01:00 (CET)
  - Summer (DST): UTC+02:00 (CEST)
- Postal codes: 07570
- Dialling codes: 03 66 03
- Vehicle registration: GRZ
- Website: www.steinsdorf-thueringen.de

Steinsdorf (German pronunciation: [ˈʃtaɪnsˌdɔʁf]) is a village and a former municipality in the district of Greiz, in Thuringia, Germany. Since 31 December 2013, it is part of the town Weida.
