= Hermsdorf-Klosterlausnitz station =

Railway station in Hermsdorf, Germany

Hermsdorf Klosterlausnitz
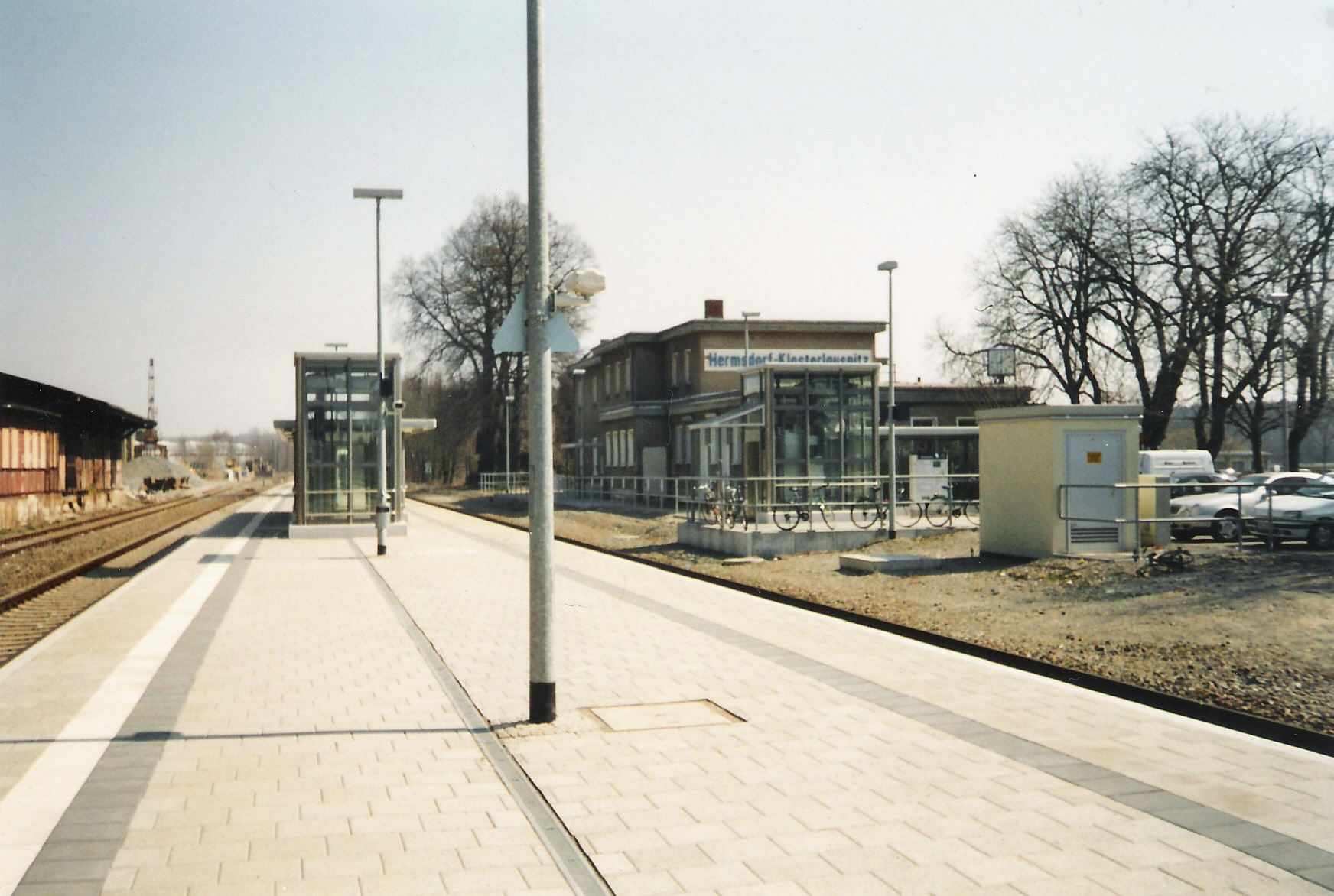
- Hermsdorf-Klosterlausnitz station (2003), former entrance building on the right

General information
- Location: Bahnhofstr. 1, Hermsdorf-Klosterlausnitz, Thuringia; Germany
- Coordinates: 50°54′13″N 11°51′30″E
- Owner: Deutsche Bahn
- Operator: DB Netz; DB Station&Service
- Line: Weimar–Gera Hbf (km 48.3)
- Platforms: 2

Construction
- Accessible: Yes

Other information
- Station code: 2721
- DS100 code: UHK
- IBNR: 8011862
- Category: 5
- Website: www.bahnhof.de

History
- Opened: 29 July 1876

Services
Preceding station	DB Fernverkehr	Following station
Stadtroda towards Köln Hbf	IC 51	Gera Hbf Terminus
Preceding station	DB Regio Südost	Following station
Stadtroda towards Göttingen	RE 1	Gera Hbf towards Glauchau (Sachs)
Stadtroda towards Erfurt Hbf	RE 3	Gera Hbf towards Altenburg or Greiz
Preceding station		Following station
Papiermühle (Stadtr) towards Erfurt Hbf	RB 21	Kraftsdorf towards Gera Hbf
Location
- Location within Thuringia Location within Germany Location within Europe

Hermsdorf-Klosterlausnitz station is a station on the Weimar–Gera railway, which forms part of the Mid-Germany Railway (Mitte-Deutschland-Verbindung), in the German state of Thuringia.

The station is located in the town of Hermsdorf and the tracks separate the old and new town. During the modernisation of the Mid-Germany Railway, the station received a new island platform and was reduced to two through tracks. The "house" platform next to the former entrance building was demolished.

== Location ==
The station is located in the north of the town of Hermsdorf. The town centre of Bad Klosterlausnitz, which the station is also named after, is located about one and a half kilometres away. The adjacent streets are Am Bahnhof and Eisenberger Straße. The next station to the west is Papiermühle, which is about five kilometres away. To the east, it is Kraftsdorf, which is about seven kilometres away.

== History ==
The station’s opening ceremony took place on 28 July 1876. Public passenger services commenced the next day. The station building included a post office and telegraph office at the time of its opening and a restaurant was added later. Postcards and tickets could be purchased at the same counter.

In 1903, 72 wagons with 700 hundredweight (Zentner) of ladders were dispatched at the station. A large exercise of the Hermsdorf health colony took place on the grounds of Hermsdorf station under the direction of the colony’s physician, Dr. Schuster, on 25 July 1932. The freight yard was expanded in July 1936.

An ammunition train was hit and bombed during an air raid on the morning of 11 April 1945. The forest in the area around the signal box was largely destroyed. Even the houses near it were badly damaged. Large amounts of this ammunition were simply left in a crater and were only cleared when the bus station was renovated years later. The salvage of this material required much effort.

The street that had previously been called Bahnhofstraße (station street) was renamed Josef-Stalin-Straße after Joseph Stalin on 21 December 1951. The station forecourt was rebuilt to a new design in 1952. A small park was built at the station in 1964. Another reconstruction of the forecourt took place a year later, including the building of the bus station. A secondary building at the station, which had served to supply water for toilets and for the steam locomotives, was demolished in 1974. In the same year there were extensions to the entrance building. Celebrations were held on the occasion of the 100th anniversary of the opening of the Weimar–Gera railway on 3 July 1976, with many people gathering at Hermsdorf station. All construction work was completed in 1977. The Mitropa restaurant returned to service on 3 April 1978. A new crane system was purchased in 1986.

The planning approval process for the replacement of the station bridge was initiated on 19 February 2000. It was planned to build it 1.2 metres (3 ft 11 in) higher than the previous bridge. Initially the town did not receive the additional payment required from Deutsche Bahn. The construction of the bridge was initially postponed on 6 January 2001, when the former federal transport minister Kurt Bodewig stopped further construction on the Mid-Germany Railway.

On 10 February of the same year, it was announced the station would be reconstructed. Deutsche Bahn built a new rail track at the station on 3 April. Major construction at the station began on 22 April. A pedestrian subway with a lift was built. The subway section under the tracks was sunk on 19 July. During the work on the forecourt of the station, fire bombs from 1772 and two smoke grenades deployed during the Second World War were uncovered, which caused an elaborate evacuation. The old bridge, dating from 1875, was demolished on 15 March 2004. The bridge was opened on 29 October together with a new roundabout and the renovated Eisenacher Straße.

Two thieves removed the tracks of a siding with a welding torch on 9 February 2008, but they were caught in the act. The signal box at the station bridge, which had been taken out of service on 28 September 2006, was demolished on 28 May 2008. In total there were two signal boxes. Both incorporated mechanical interlockings of the Jüdel type. Today, all signalling operations are managed centrally from Leipzig. The goods shed opposite the station were also demolished in May 2009. A new ticket machine went into operation in October 2009. Passengers had often criticised the station for being in a messy and unclean condition. From then on, a contractor has cleaned it twice a week. A council decision was taken on 11 April 2011 to charge for parking in front of the station. A private investor bought the then-vacant entrance building on 8 April 2013.

== Infrastructure ==
=== Platforms and tracks ===
The approach to the platform is accessible by two lifts.

Platform	Length in m	Height in cm	Use
1	165	55	Services towards Gera
2	165	55	Services towards Jena

== Transport services ==
Hermsdorf-Klosterlausnitz station was originally one the stations on the Weimar–Gera line that was used by long-distance services. However, some of the long-distance services on the line did not stop there, including the InterRegio trains that ran from 1993 onwards. In addition to the long-distance services, which were important for the health resort in Bad Klosterlausnitz, the station was and still is important for the commuter and shopping traffic to the two neighbouring centres of Jena and Gera.

Before the Second World War, only a few trains served the line. In the summer timetable of 1938, it was served by two semi-fast trains and an express and all stopped in Hermsdorf-Klosterlausnitz:

- E65/66: Chemnitz – Gera – Hermsdorf-Klosterlausnitz – Erfurt – Gotha – Eichenberg – Kassel – Bad Wildungen (and return)
- E97/98: Chemnitz – Gera – Hermsdorf-Klosterlausnitz – Weimar (and return)
- D90/89: Eger – Gera – Hermsdorf-Klosterlausnitz – Weimar with through coach and sleeping car to Cologne – Mönchengladbach – Vlissingen (and return)

In addition, there were ten daily stopping trains in each direction, an early morning commuter service to Gera beginning in Hermsdorf-Klosterlausnitz, and a pair of trains on weekends (Saturday towards Gera, on Sundays towards Jena).

After the war, the line through Hermsdorf-Klosterlausnitz gradually gained in importance as the most southerly east-west link in the GDR. In the 1965/66 timetable there were two semi-fast and two express services, of which only the two express trains stopped in Hermsdorf-Klosterlausnitz:

- E265/266: Görlitz – Dresden – Chemnitz – Zwickau – Gera – Hermsdorf-Klosterlausnitz – Erfurt (and return)
- E269/270: Zwickau – Gera – Hermsdorf-Klosterlausnitz – Erfurt – Eisenach (and return, starting from Bad Salzungen)

The passenger service choice had deteriorated from prewar times. There were now only seven daily stopping services, plus three pairs of trains from Hermsdorf-Klosterlausnitz to Gera and back.

The Reichsbahn gradually increased its long-distance service offer on the route via Hermsdorf. In 1984, for example, almost all the express trains still stopped there. In total, passenger were able to use a semi-fast service and three expresses towards Jena and a semi-fast service and two expresses towards Gera. The stopping services had once again reached the prewar level with ten train pairs between Jena and Gera, a further stopping service arrived from Gera and a pair of commuter services ran between Hermsdorf-Klosterlausnitz and Gera.

After the end of Communism, the long-distance services were significantly upgraded. In the winter 1990/91 timetable, one pair of semi-fast services, five pairs of expresses and several individual seasonal or holiday trains stopped at the station. Two trains went to and from Düsseldorf, all the others remained in the Reichsbahn area (East Germany). In 1985, the number of passenger trains had been increased by one pair of stopping trains.

Just a few years later, however, the number of long-distance services stopping at the station was noticeably reduced. In the 1993/94 timetable, only one pair of expresses on the Chemnitz–Erfurt route stopped in Hermsdorf-Klosterlausnitz, while the newly-introduced InterRegio line 41 services from Chemnitz to Aachen passed through without stopping. However, in the intervals between the InterRegio services, which ran only every four hours, additional semi-fast trains ran from Erfurt to Gera, continuing to Altenburg, Zwickau or Greiz, which also stopped in Hermsdorf-Klosterlausnitz. The number of stopping trains, which are now referred to as local trains, remained the same. In addition, clock-face timetables were gradually introduced in the following year.

Since the end of the 1990s, Hermsdorf-Klosterlausnitz has been served exclusively by regional services. The number of services was also significantly expanded with the end of the long-distance services, with Regionalbahn and Regional-Express services both running hourly on working days.

Deutsche Bahn assigns Hermsdorf-Klosterlausnitz station to category 5. Deutsche Reichsbahn classified it as a fourth-class station.

Line	Route	Frequency (min)
IC 51	Gera Hbf – Hermsdorf-Klosterlausnitz – Weimar – Erfurt – Gotha – Eisenach – Kassel-Wilhelmshöhe – (Paderborn – Hamm – Dortmund – Bochum – Essen – Düsseldorf/Cologne)	6 h
RE 1	Göttingen– Gotha – Erfurt Hbf – Weimar – Jena-Göschwitz – Hermsdorf-Klosterlausnitz– Gera Hbf –Glauchau	120
RE 3	Erfurt Hbf – Weimar – Jena - Göschwitz – Hermsdorf-Klosterlausnitz – Gera – Altenburg / – Greiz	120
RB 21	(Erfurt Hbf–) Weimar – Jena - Göschwitz – Hermsdorf-Klosterlausnitz – Gera Hbf	60 (Mon–Fri); 120 (Sat/Sun)
