= Weischlitz station =

Railway station in Weischlitz, Germany

Weischlitz
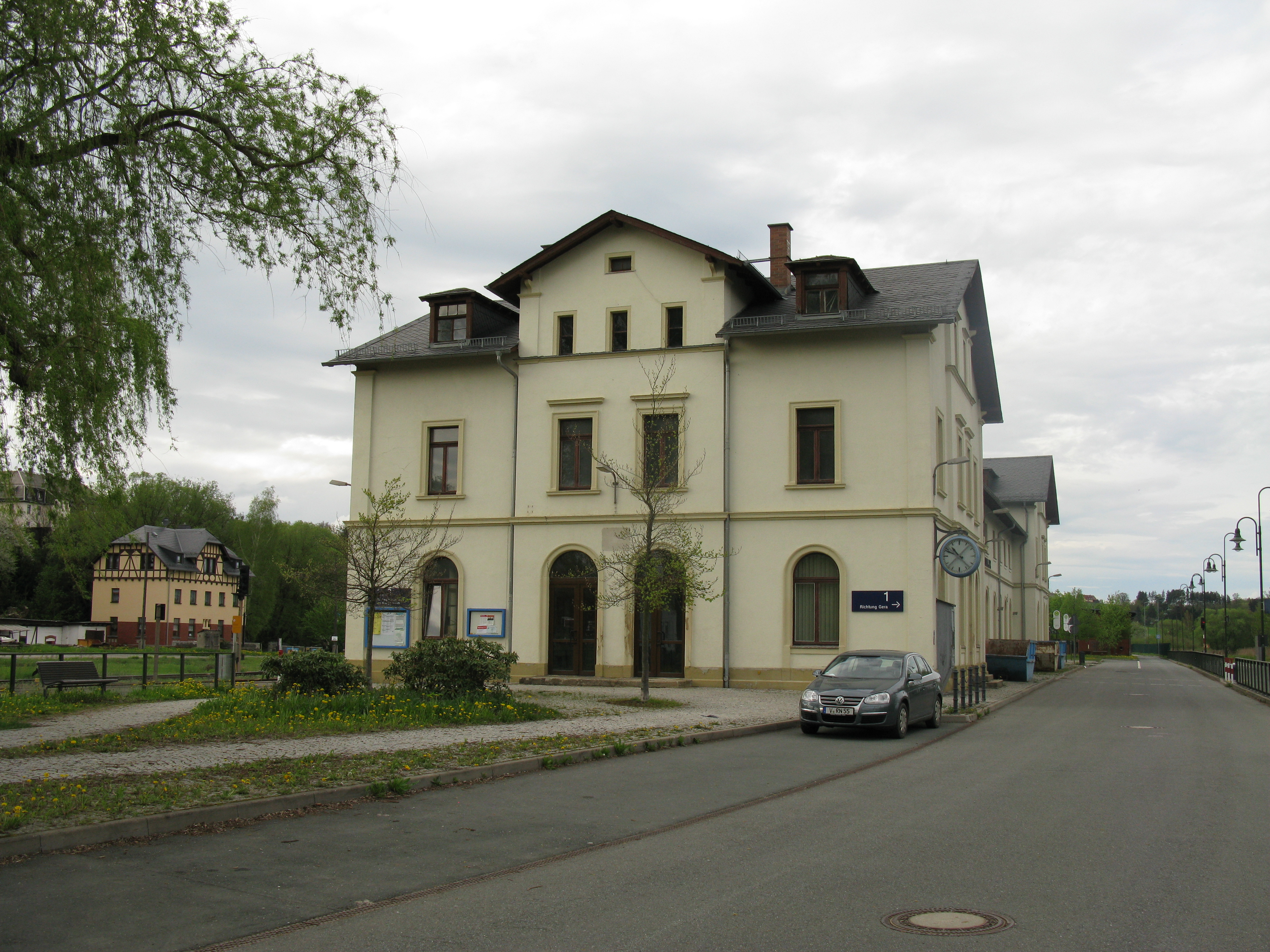
- Weischlitz station in 2013

General information
- Location: Bahnhofstr. 1, Weischlitz, Saxony; Germany
- Coordinates: 50°26′55″N 12°03′38″E
- Lines: Gera Süd–Weischlitz (km 59.90); Plauen–Cheb (km 9.45)
- Platforms: 3

Construction
- Accessible: Yes

Other information
- Station code: 6624
- DS100 code: DWS
- IBNR: 8010367
- Category: 6
- Website: www.bahnhof.de

History
- Opened: 1 November 1874

Services
Preceding station	Vogtlandbahn	Following station
Pirk towards Cheb	RB 2	Kürbitz towards Zwickau Zentrum
Kürbitz towards Gera Hbf	RB 4	Terminus
Location
- Location within Saxony

Weischlitz station is a local railway junction in the municipality of Weischlitz in Vogtland in the German state of Saxony. The station is located on the Plauen–Cheb railway and the railway from Gera Süd.

== History ==
The Voigtland State Railway (Voigtländische Staatseisenbahn), which was opened in 1865 by the Royal Saxon State Railways (Königlich Sächsische Staatseisenbahnen), provided a rail connection to numerous villages and towns in the Vogtland railway, but it involved numerous twists on a long route. In the 1860s, it was planned to shorten the route by the construction of the Plauen–Oelsnitz link. Weischlitz received a station on the section of the line approved in 1868.

The White Elster was moved a little farther west into a new river bed to allow the station to be built on the river bed. From the outset, the station was designed for the integration of the Wolfsgefährth–Weischlitz railway of the private Saxon-Thuringian Railway Company (Sächsisch-Thüringische Eisenbahngesellschaft, Sä.-Th.E.). Weischlitz station was opened on 1 November 1874 together with the Plauen–Oelsnitz line. The private railway built its facilities east of the existing facilities of the state railway, the only necessary change to the buildings that had already been built was a slight enlargement of the entrance building. The Sä.-Th.E. opened its last section between Plauen unt Bf (Plauen lower station) and Weischlitz on 20 September 1875. A rail link enabled the exchange of carriages. The station became a virtual Inselbahnhof (island station), since the entrance building was surrounded by tracks, except for the access road.

The Sä.-Th.E., along with its railways, was taken over by the Saxon state in 1876, but this did not change rail operations at all. The trains to Wolfsgefährth continued to begin and end in the eastern part of the station.

In the following years smaller additions and conversions were made, including the building of another auxiliary building and an additional loading track with a ramp. Larger conversions and extensions were made around 1900. Following the largest stage of building, there were 42 sets of points and 21 tracks in the station, of which 9 were on the Plauen side and 12 were on the Gera side. Four platform tracks were used for passenger services, while several freight tracks, ramps and a goods shed were available for freight operations. In addition, there was a private storage shed. An overpass was built for the village’s main street, which crosses the railway at the southern end of the station.

In essence, the railways remained the same until after the Second World War. After the Second World War the tracks inside the station was reduced by the dismantling of the second through track for reparations.

In the mid-1970s all semaphore signals were replaced by colour light signals. With the economic impact of Die Wende, the freight traffic almost completely disappeared. Until the end of the 1990s, only three tracks on the eastern and six tracks on the western side were used. Then a platform track on the eastern side was dismantled in favour of a bus loop.

There are now eight railway tracks in the station, six of them on the west side. There is also the loading track, the only remaining track for freight traffic.

=== Weischlitz locomotive depot ===
The Sä.-Th.E. built a two-storey Heizhaus (a roundhouse where locomotives were heated) in Weischlitz. In 1899, this rectangular building was supplemented by four further stalls, which could be reached via a 20-m turntable. In the meantime, it was no more than a minor locomotive depot, which was responsible after the Second World War to Adorf locomotive depot (Bahnbetriebswerk Adorf). Later it was responsible to Reichenbach locomotive depot. With the change of traction to diesel, the locomotive depot became redundant and closed in the 1970s. The listed Heizhaus still exist, but the turntable was dismantled before 1989.
