= Schömberg, Thuringia =

Schömberg
- Ortsteil of Weida
- Interactive map of Schömberg
- Location within Germany Location within Thuringia
- Coordinates: 50°46′N 12°1′E
- Country: Germany
- State: Thuringia
- District: Greiz
- Town: Weida

Area
  - Total: 5.00 km^{2} (1.93 sq mi)
- Elevation: 350 m (1,150 ft)

Population (2012-12-31)
  - Total: 109
  - Density: 21.8/km^{2} (56.5/sq mi)
- Time zone: UTC+01:00 (CET)
  - Summer (DST): UTC+02:00 (CEST)
- Postal codes: 07570
- Dialling codes: 036603

Schömberg (German pronunciation: [ˈʃøːmbɛʁk]) is a village and a former municipality in the district of Greiz, in Thuringia, Germany. Since 31 December 2013, it is part of the town Weida.
