= Kühdorf =

- Ortsteil of Langenwetzendorf
- Interactive map of Kühdorf
- Location within Germany Location within Thuringia
- Coordinates: 50°42′26″N 12°6′37″E
- Country: Germany
- State: Thuringia
- District: Greiz
- Municipality: Langenwetzendorf

Area
  - Total: 2.20 km^{2} (0.85 sq mi)
- Elevation: 365 m (1,198 ft)

Population (2021-12-31)
  - Total: 62
  - Density: 28/km^{2} (73/sq mi)
- Time zone: UTC+01:00 (CET)
  - Summer (DST): UTC+02:00 (CEST)
- Postal codes: 07980
- Dialling codes: 03 66 25

Kühdorf is a village and a former municipality in the district of Greiz, in Thuringia, Germany. On 1 January 2023 it became part of the municipality Langenwetzendorf.
