= Elster Viaduct =

Coordinates: 50°33′12.7″N 12°10′3.60″E

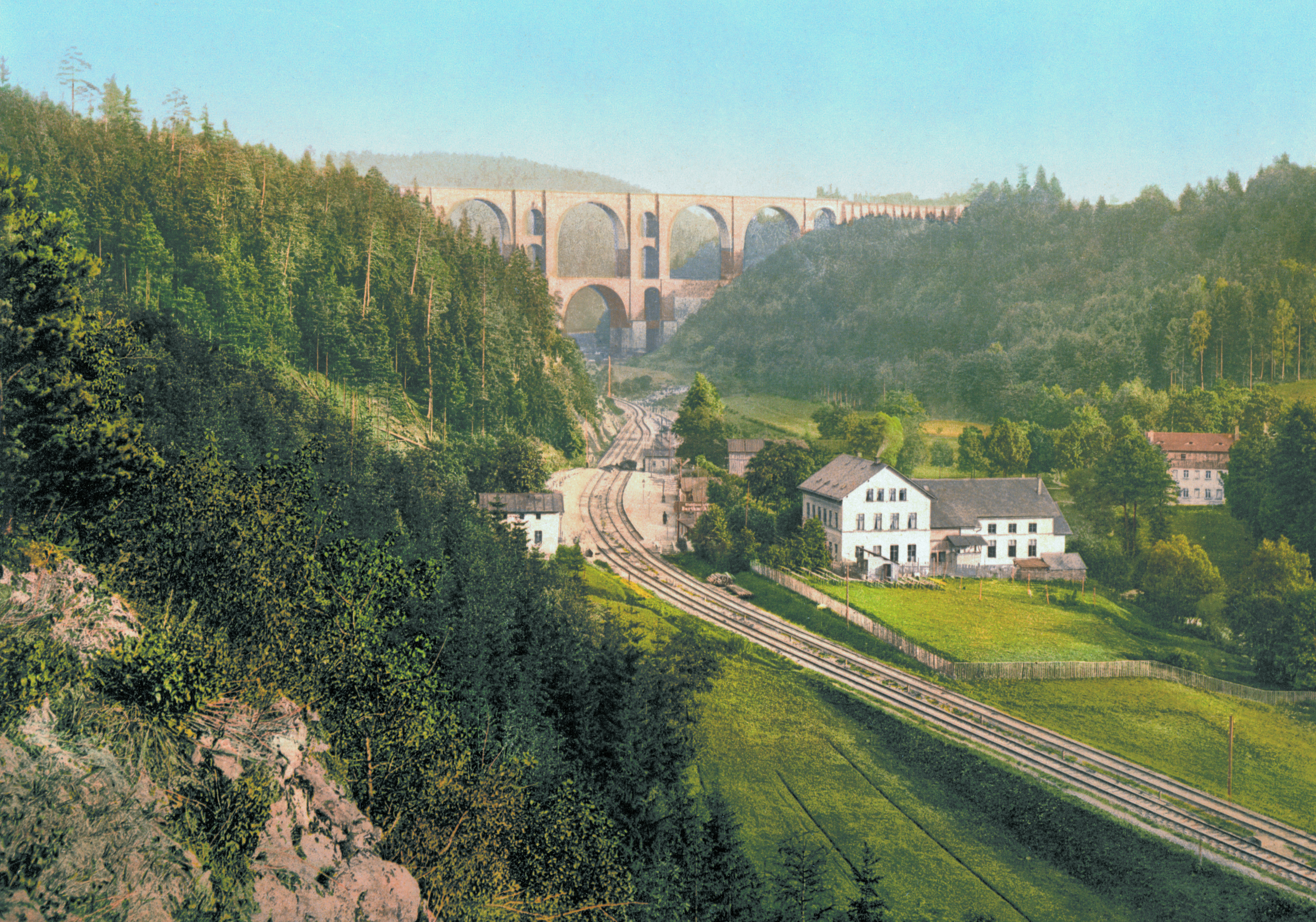
The Elster Valley Viaduct in 1900

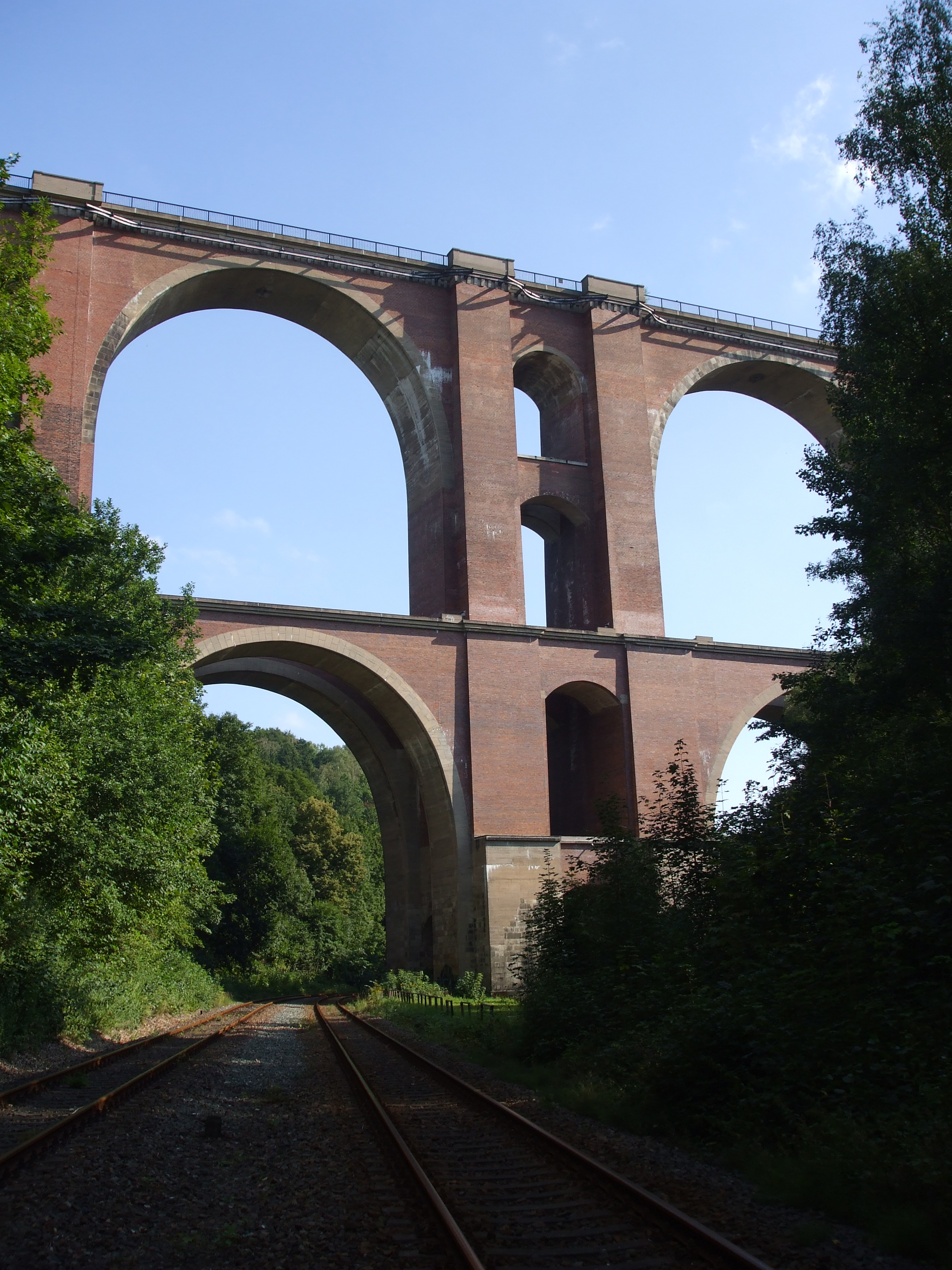
Close up of the viaduct in 2008

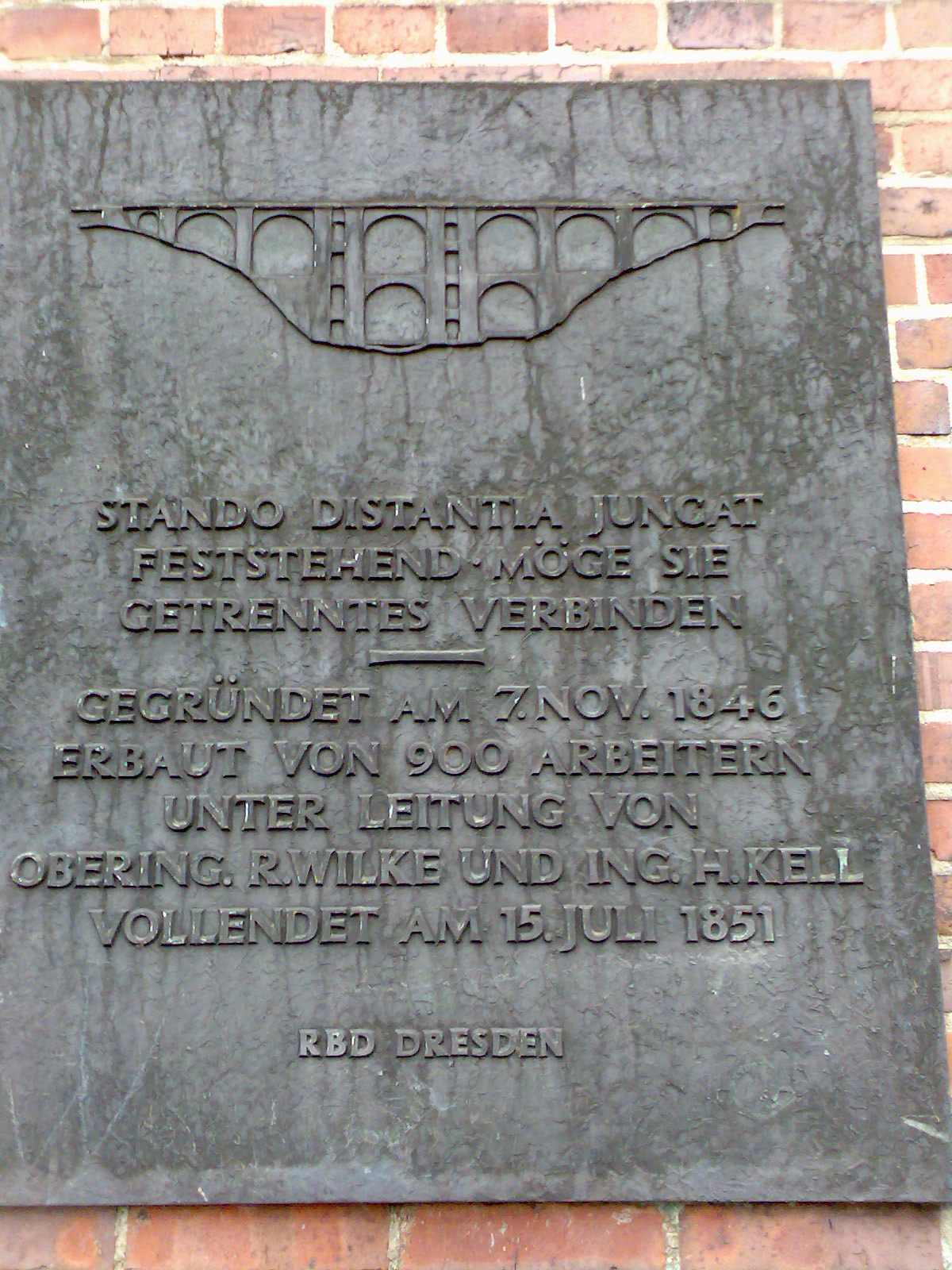
Plaque

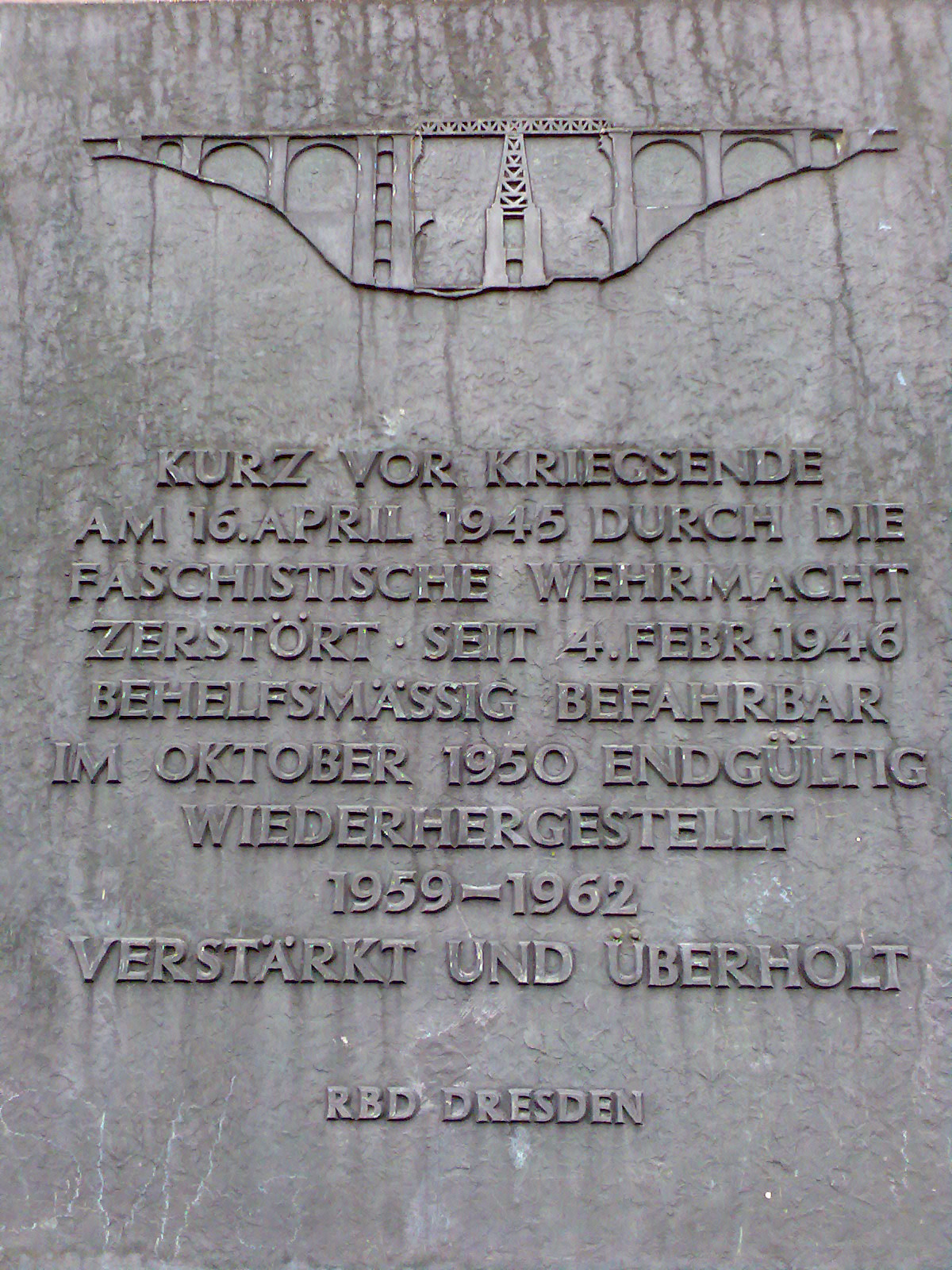
Plaque

The Elster Viaduct (German: Elstertalbrücke) is a railway bridge in the German state of Saxony. It carries the Leipzig–Hof line near Jocketa over the valley of the White Elster. After the Göltzsch Viaduct (Göltzschtalbrücke) it is the second largest brick bridge in the world. The Elster Valley Railway passes under the 68 metre-high bridge.

== History ==
The viaduct was built in the course of the construction of the Leipzig–Hof line of the Saxon-Bavarian State Railway (Sächsisch-Bayerische Staatseisenbahn). The foundation stone was laid on 7 November 1846. Up to 800 workers worked on the bridge from 1846 to 1851, laying 12 million bricks. In contrast to the Göltzsch Viaduct, which is only nine metres higher, it was built with normally shaped arches on only two levels. The lower level has five piers, four of which are built as double piers. The foundations of the piers and the deck were built out of slabs of granite.

In the last days of the Second World War on 16 April 1945 the German Wehrmacht partially demolished the bridge. This meant that trains from the southwest could only run as far as Röttis and from the northeast only as far as Jocketa. A temporary bridge was erected by attaching a steel truss to the remains of the demolished central supporting pier, which supported the girders of a timber bridge. This important bridge was reopened to traffic in February 1946. The final reconstruction of the two collapsed masonry brick arches was completed in October 1950.

The top of the lower arches carries a hiking trail. There are plaques on this level showing the reconstruction after the Second World War.

== Specifications ==
Height	68 metres on 2 levels
Length	279 m, maximum span of arches: 31.1 m
Number of bricks	12,323,000
Brick masonry	31,237 m³
Stone masonry	21,579 m³

== See also ==
- List of bridges in Germany
