= Wildetaube =

- Ortsteil of Langenwetzendorf
- Coat of arms
- Interactive map of Wildetaube
- Location within Germany Location within Thuringia
- Coordinates: 50°43′N 12°7′E
- Country: Germany
- State: Thuringia
- District: Greiz
- Municipality: Langenwetzendorf

Area
  - Total: 7.27 km^{2} (2.81 sq mi)
- Elevation: 365 m (1,198 ft)

Population (2012-12-31)
  - Total: 669
  - Density: 92.0/km^{2} (238/sq mi)
- Time zone: UTC+01:00 (CET)
  - Summer (DST): UTC+02:00 (CEST)
- Postal codes: 07980
- Dialling codes: 036623

Wildetaube is a village and a former municipality in the district of Greiz, in Thuringia, Germany. Since 31 December 2013, it is part of the municipality Langenwetzendorf.
