= Hohenölsen =

- Ortsteil of Weida
- Coat of arms
- Interactive map of Hohenölsen
- Location within Germany Location within Thuringia
- Coordinates: 50°43′N 12°3′E
- Country: Germany
- State: Thuringia
- District: Greiz
- Town: Weida

Area
  - Total: 6.48 km^{2} (2.50 sq mi)
- Elevation: 372 m (1,220 ft)

Population (2012-12-31)
  - Total: 607
  - Density: 93.7/km^{2} (243/sq mi)
- Time zone: UTC+01:00 (CET)
  - Summer (DST): UTC+02:00 (CEST)
- Postal codes: 07570
- Dialling codes: 036603

Hohenölsen (German pronunciation: [ˌhoːənˈøːlzn̩]) is a village and a former municipality in the district of Greiz, in Thuringia, Germany. Since 31 December 2013, it is part of the town Weida.
