= Neumark, Saxony =

Neumark
- Municipality
- Location of Neumark within Vogtlandkreis district
- Interactive map of Neumark
- Location within Germany Location within Saxony
- Coordinates: 50°40′N 12°21′E
- Country: Germany
- State: Saxony
- District: Vogtlandkreis
- Subdivisions: 3

Government
  - Mayor (2019–26): Sven Köpp (FDP)

Area
  - Total: 17.31 km^{2} (6.68 sq mi)
- Elevation: 373 m (1,224 ft)

Population (2025-12-31)
  - Total: 2,844
  - Density: 164.3/km^{2} (425.5/sq mi)
- Time zone: UTC+01:00 (CET)
  - Summer (DST): UTC+02:00 (CEST)
- Postal codes: 08496
- Dialling codes: 037600
- Vehicle registration: V, AE, OVL, PL, RC
- Website: www.neumark-vogtland.de

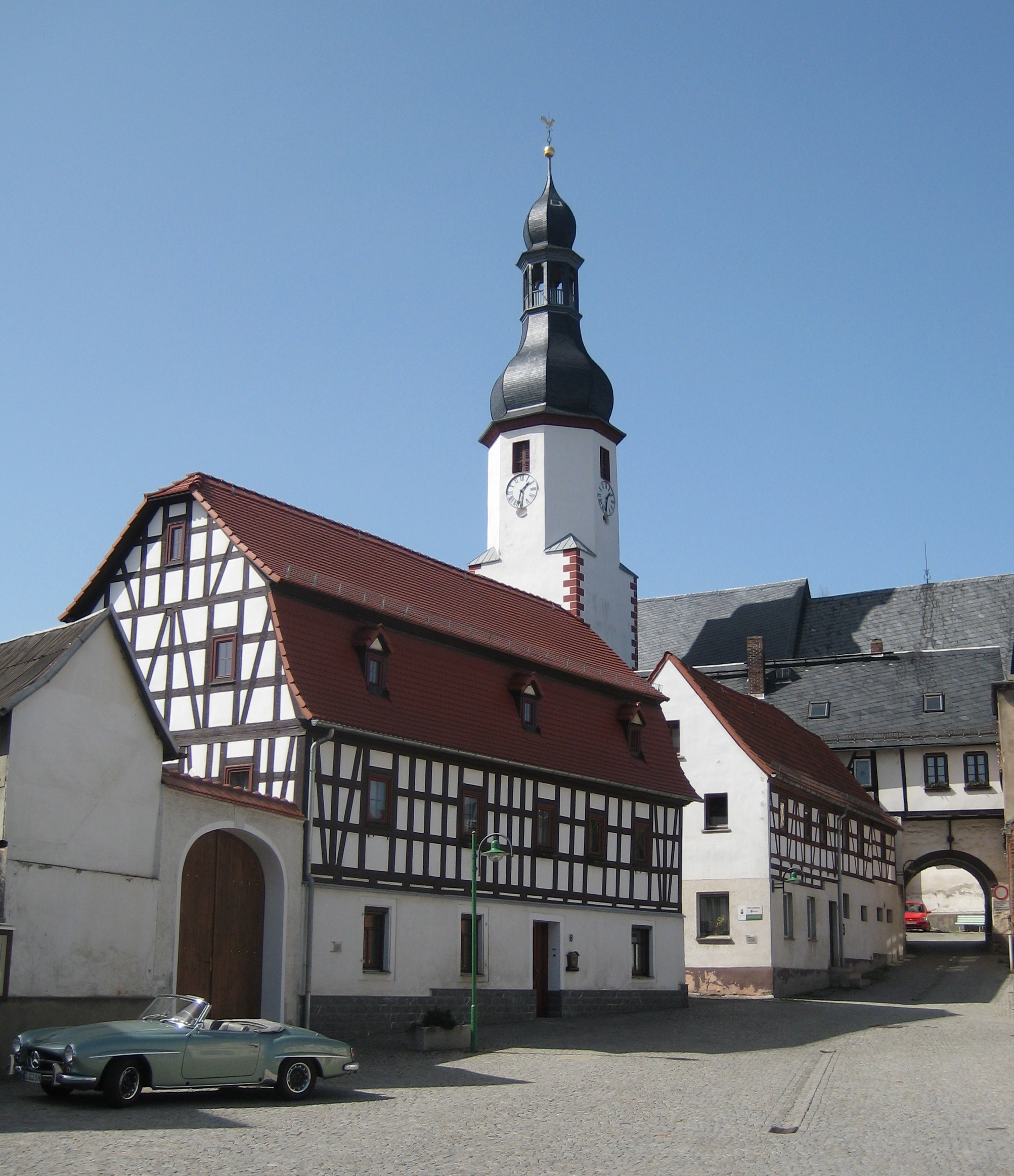
Neumark (Saxony)

Neumark (German pronunciation: [ˈnɔʏmaʁk]) is a municipality in the Vogtlandkreis district, in Saxony, Germany.
