= Langenwetzendorf =

- Municipality
- Coat of arms

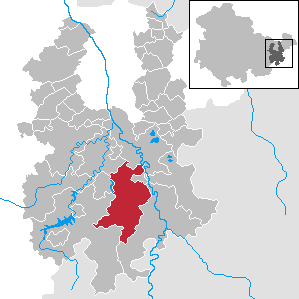
- Location of Langenwetzendorf within Greiz district
- Interactive map of Langenwetzendorf
- Location within Germany Location within Thuringia
- Coordinates: 50°40′37″N 12°5′53″E
- Country: Germany
- State: Thuringia
- District: Greiz

Government
  - Mayor (2021–27): Kai Dittmann (CDU)

Area
  - Total: 58.41 km^{2} (22.55 sq mi)
- Elevation: 338 m (1,109 ft)

Population (2025-12-31)
  - Total: 3,942
  - Density: 67.49/km^{2} (174.8/sq mi)
- Time zone: UTC+01:00 (CET)
  - Summer (DST): UTC+02:00 (CEST)
- Postal codes: 07957
- Dialling codes: 036625
- Vehicle registration: GRZ
- Website: www.langenwetzendorf.de

Langenwetzendorf is a municipality in the district of Greiz, in Thuringia, Germany.

== History ==
Within the German Empire (1871-1918), Langenwetzendorf was part of the Principality of Reuss-Gera. In January 2023 Langenwetzendorf absorbed the former municipality Kühdorf.

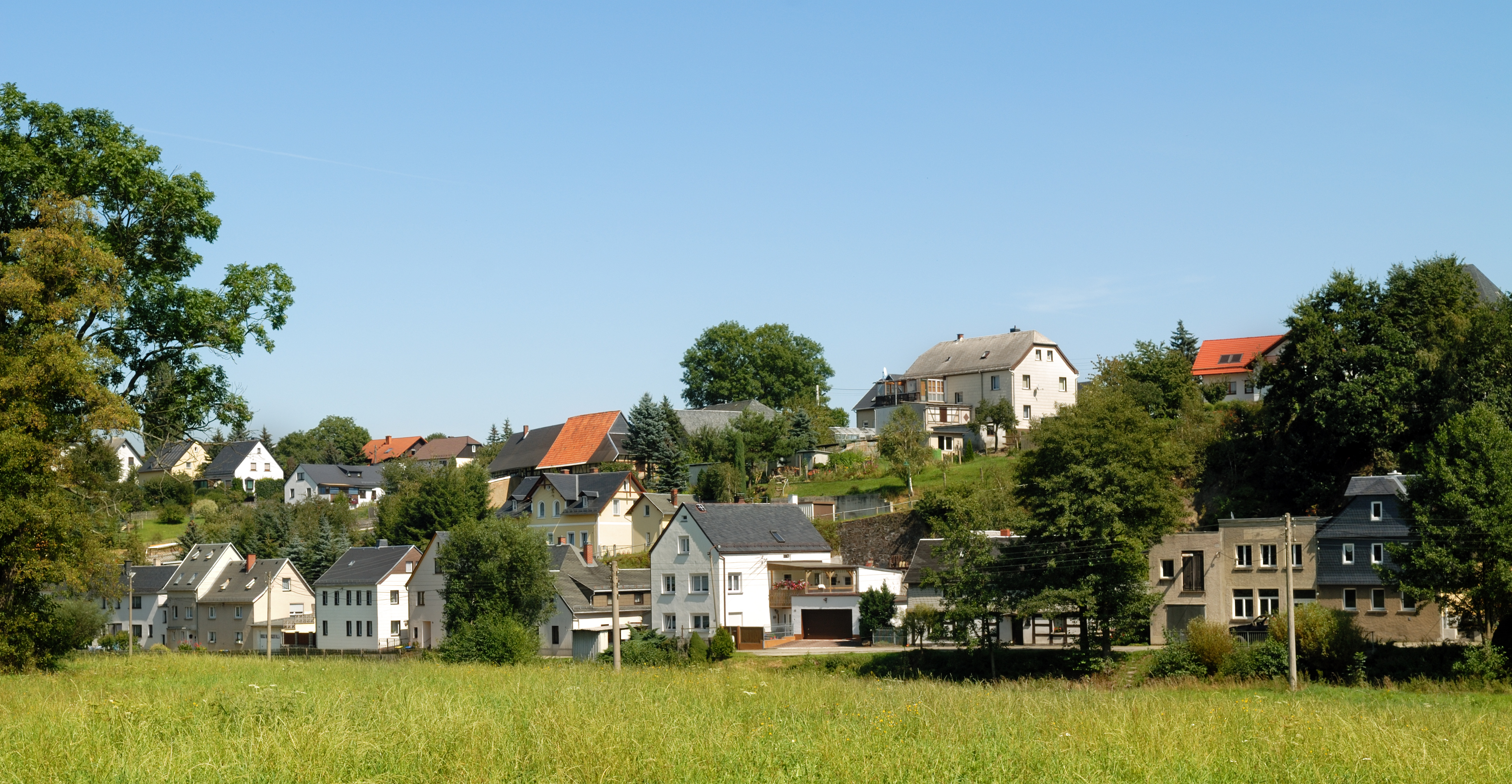
Langenwetzendorf
