= Naumburg (Saale) Hauptbahnhof =

Railway station in Naumburg (Saale), Germany

Naumburg (Saale) Hbf
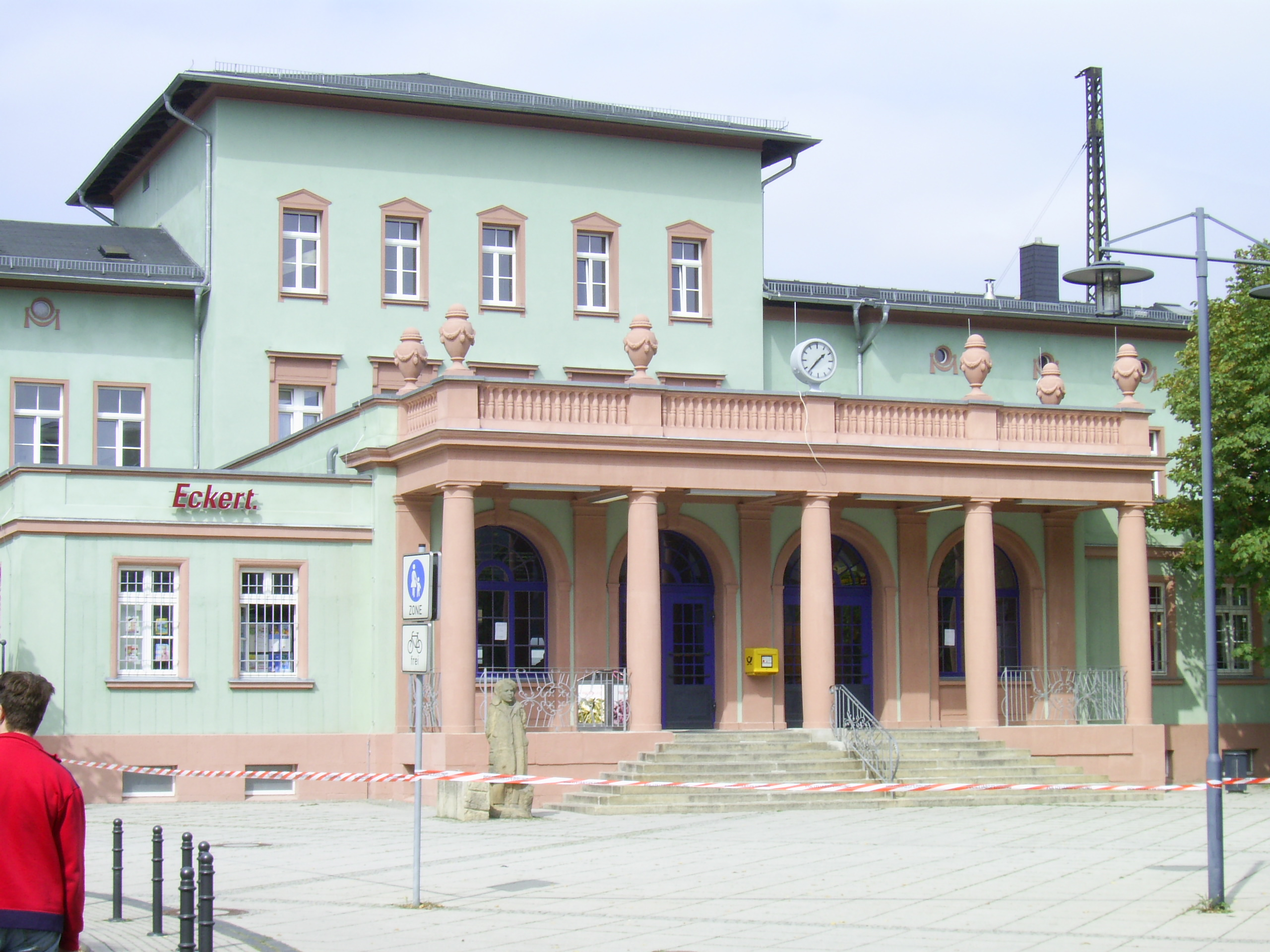

General information
- Location: Bahnhofstraße 46, 06618 Naumburg, Saxony-Anhalt; Germany
- Coordinates: 51°9′47″N 11°47′49″E
- Lines: Thuringian Railway (KBS 508 and 581); Naumburg–Teuchern railway (KBS 551); Naumburg–Reinsdorf railway (KBS 585)
- Platforms: 5

Construction
- Accessible: Yes

Other information
- Station code: 4309
- DS100 code: UNM
- IBNR: 8010240
- Category: 3
- Fare zone: MDV: 255
- Website: www.bahnhof.de

History
- Opened: 19 December 1846; 179 years ago
- Electrified: 1941-1946; 28 May 1967; 59 years ago
Services
| Preceding station | DB Fernverkehr | Following station |
|---|---|---|
| Jena Paradies towards München Hbf | ICE 18 | Leipzig Hbf towards Berlin Gesundbrunnen |
| Jena Paradies towards Karlsruhe Hbf | IC 61 | Weißenfels towards Leipzig Hbf |
| Preceding station | Abellio Rail Mitteldeutschland | Following station |
| Bad Kösen towards Saalfeld (Saale) | RE 15 | Weißenfels towards Leipzig Hbf |
| Bad Kösen towards Erfurt Hbf | RE 16 | Weißenfels towards Halle (Saale) Hbf |
| Bad Kösen towards Eisenach | RB 20 | Leißling towards Leipzig Hbf |
| Bad Kösen towards Saalfeld (Saale) | RB 25 | Leißling towards Halle (Saale) Hbf |
| Naumburg-Roßbach towards Wangen | RB 77 | Naumburg (Saale) Ost Terminus |
| Preceding station | DB Regio Bayern | Following station |
| Camburg (Saale) towards Nürnberg Hbf | RE 42 | Weißenfels towards Leipzig Hbf |
| Preceding station | DB Regio Südost | Following station |
| Bad Kösen towards Halle (Saale) Hbf | RE 18 | Weißenfels towards Jena-Göschwitz |
Location
- Location within Saxony-Anhalt Location within Germany Location within Europe

Naumburg (Saale) Hauptbahnhof is located in the German state of Saxony-Anhalt and is classified by Deutsche Bahn as a category 3 station. The station is part of the zone of the Mitteldeutscher Verkehrsverbund (Central German Transport Association) and is the main station of the Burgenlandkreis (district).

== History ==
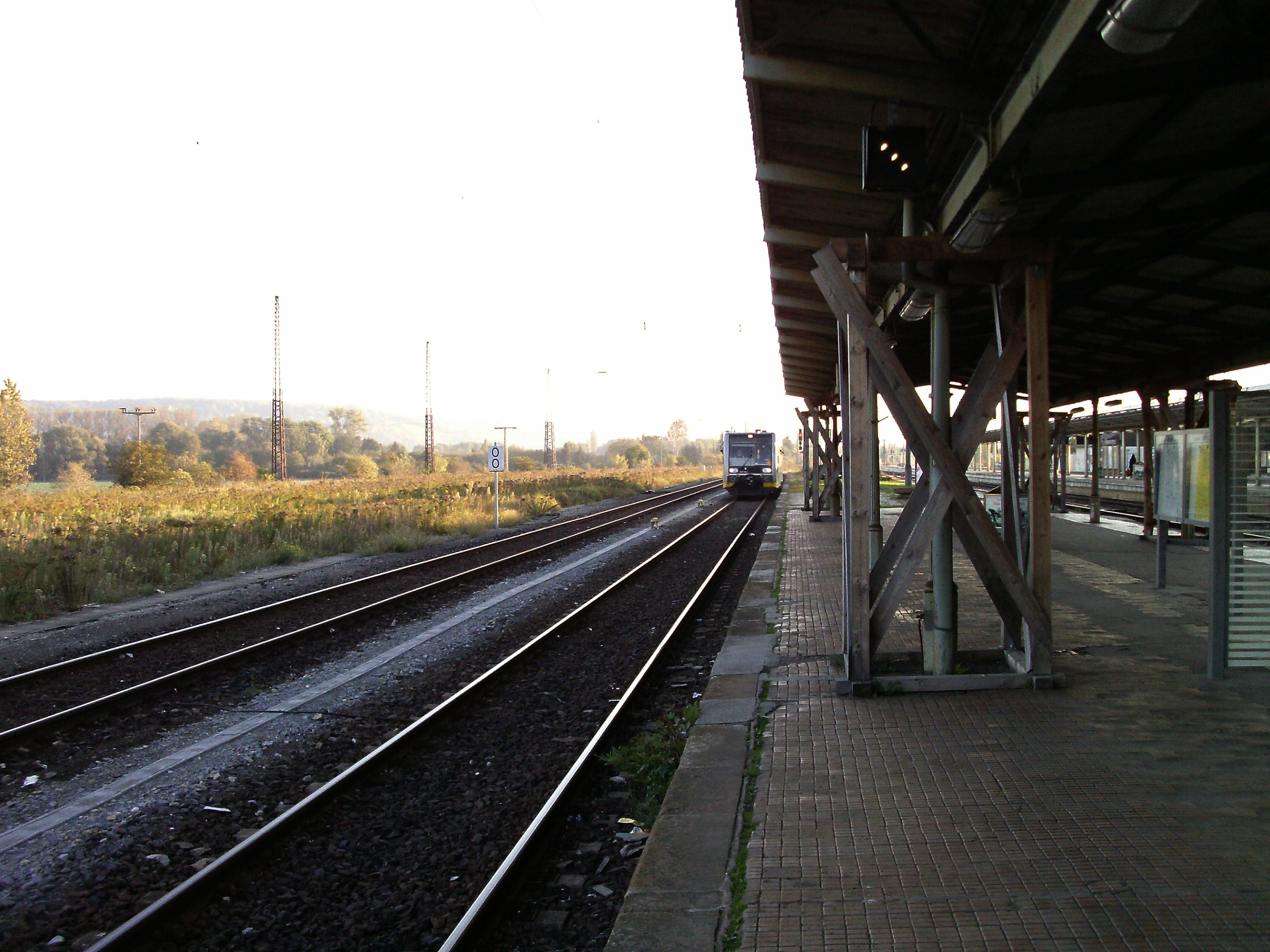
Platform in Naumburg

The station was opened in 1846, when the Thuringian Railway went into operation. The Naumburg–Reinsdorf railway was opened on 1 October 1889. This line once connected to the Sangerhausen–Erfurt railway. Finally, the Naumburg–Teuchern railway opened on 28 June 1900. This connects to the Weißenfels–Zeitz railway.

== Services ==
The Intercity (IC) services are operated with Intercity 2 sets. Until 2015, regional services were operated with locomotives of class 182, hauling y-Wagen ("y-coaches", also known as "Halberstadt" coaches). Since 13 December 2015, Bombardier Talent 2 electric multiple units have been used, with the exception of the Naumburg–Reinsdorf railway (RB 77), where Alstom Coradia LINT diesel multiple units are used, and RE 18, which is operated with class 146 locomotives with double-deck coaches.

In the 2026 timetable, the following services stop at the station:

| Train class | Route | Frequency | Operator |
|---|---|---|---|
| ICE 18 | Munich – Augsburg – Nuremberg – Jena Paradies – Naumburg – Leipzig – Berlin – Berlin Gesundbrunnen | One train pair overnight | DB Fernverkehr |
| IC 61 | Leipzig – Weißenfels – Naumburg – Jena Paradies – Nuremberg – Stuttgart – Karlsruhe | 2 train pairs | DB Fernverkehr |
| RE 15 | Leipzig – Markranstädt – Bad Dürrenberg – Weißenfels – Naumburg – Bad Kösen – Jena Paradies – Jena-Göschwitz – Rudolstadt – Saalfeld | 120 min | Abellio |
| RE 16 | Halle – Merseburg – Weißenfels – Naumburg – Großheringen – Apolda – Weimar – Erfurt | 120 min | Abellio |
| RB 20 | Leipzig – Bad Dürrenberg – Weißenfels – Naumburg – Weimar – Erfurt – Gotha – Eisenach | 60 min | Abellio |
| RB 25 | Halle – Merseburg – Weißenfels – Naumburg – Bad Kösen – Camburg – Jena Paradies – Orlamünde – Saalfeld | 60 min | Abellio |
| RB 77 | Naumburg Ost – Naumburg – Freyburg – Laucha – Nebra – Wangen | 60 min | Abellio |

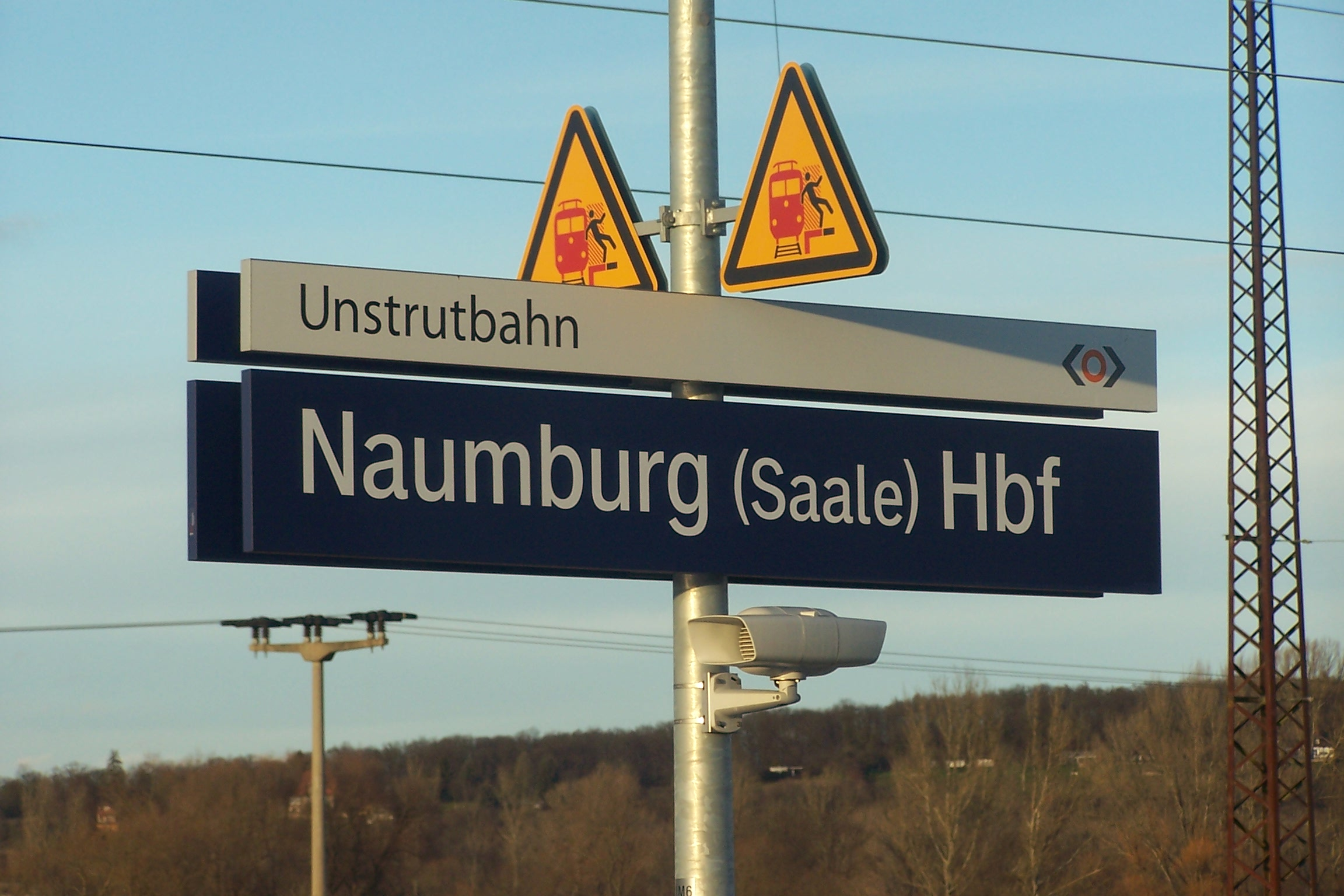
Station sign (2014).

== See also ==
- Rail transport in Germany
- Railway stations in Germany
