= Bad Dürrenberg station =

Railway station in Bad Dürrenberg, Germany

Bad Dürrenberg
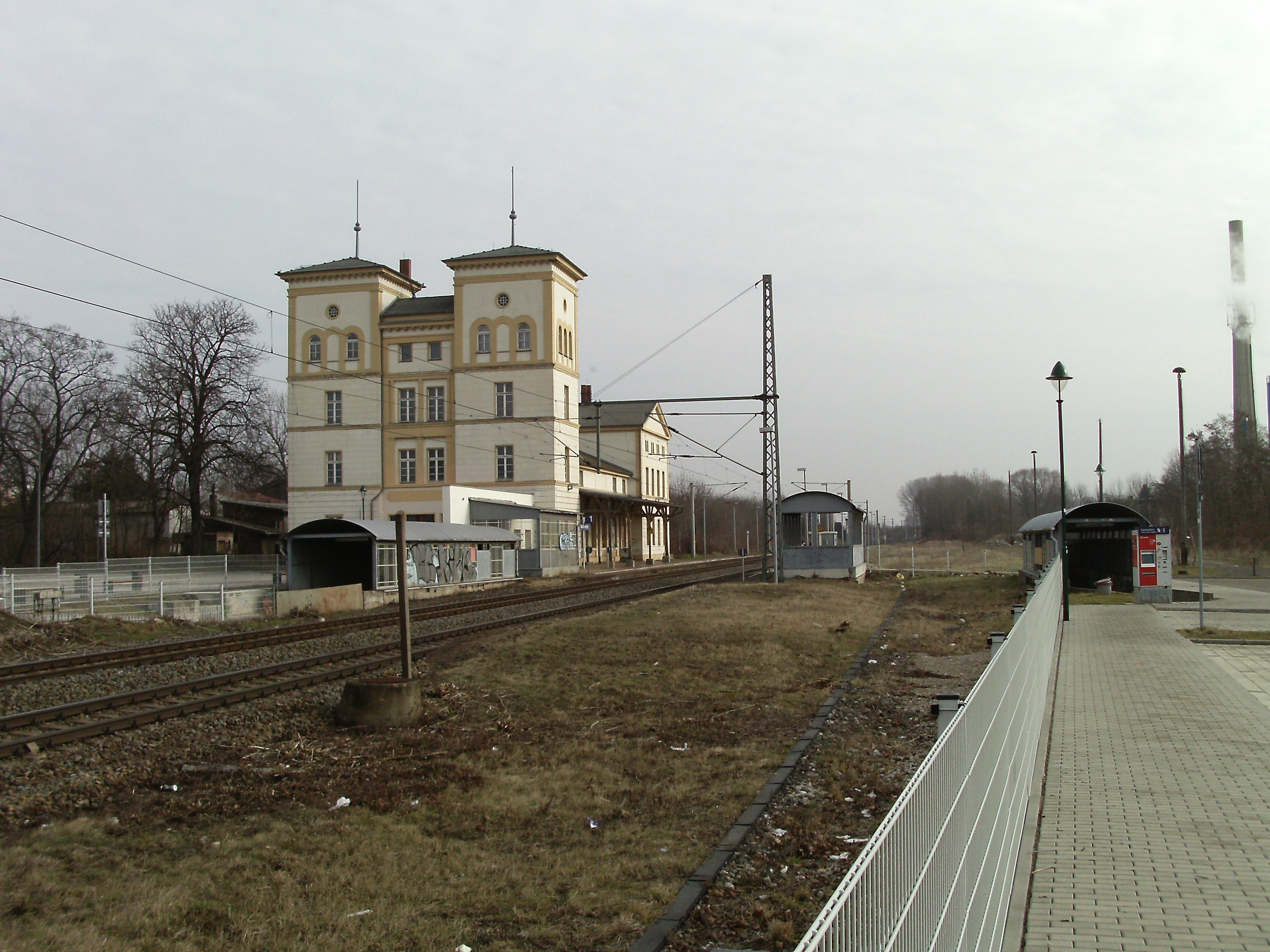
- 2012

General information
- Location: Am Bahnhof 2; 06231 Bad Dürrenberg; Saxony-Anhalt; Germany
- Coordinates: 51.3048°N 12.0697°E
- Elevation: 100 m (330 ft)
- System: Hp
- Owner: Deutsche Bahn
- Operator: DB Netz; DB Station&Service
- Lines: Leipzig–Großkorbetha railway (KBS 582)
- Platforms: 2 side platforms
- Tracks: 2
- Train operators: Abellio Rail Mitteldeutschland
- Connections: 5; 737 742 743 744 785

Construction
- Parking: yes
- Cycle facilities: yes
- Accessible: yes

Other information
- Station code: 268
- DS100 code: LDBG
- IBNR: 8011071
- Category: 6
- Fare zone: MDV: 233
- Website: www.bahnhof.de

Services
Preceding station	Abellio Rail Mitteldeutschland	Following station
Weißenfels towards Erfurt Hbf	RE 17 RE 74520 only	Markranstädt towards Leipzig Hbf
Großkorbetha towards Eisenach	RB 20	Kötzschau towards Leipzig Hbf
Location
- Location within Saxony-Anhalt Location within Germany Location within Europe

Bad Dürrenberg station (German: Haltepunkt Bad Dürrenberg) is a railway station in the municipality of Bad Dürrenberg, located in the Saalekreis district in Saxony-Anhalt, Germany.
