= Naumburg-Roßbach station =

Railway station in Germany

Naumburg-Roßbach
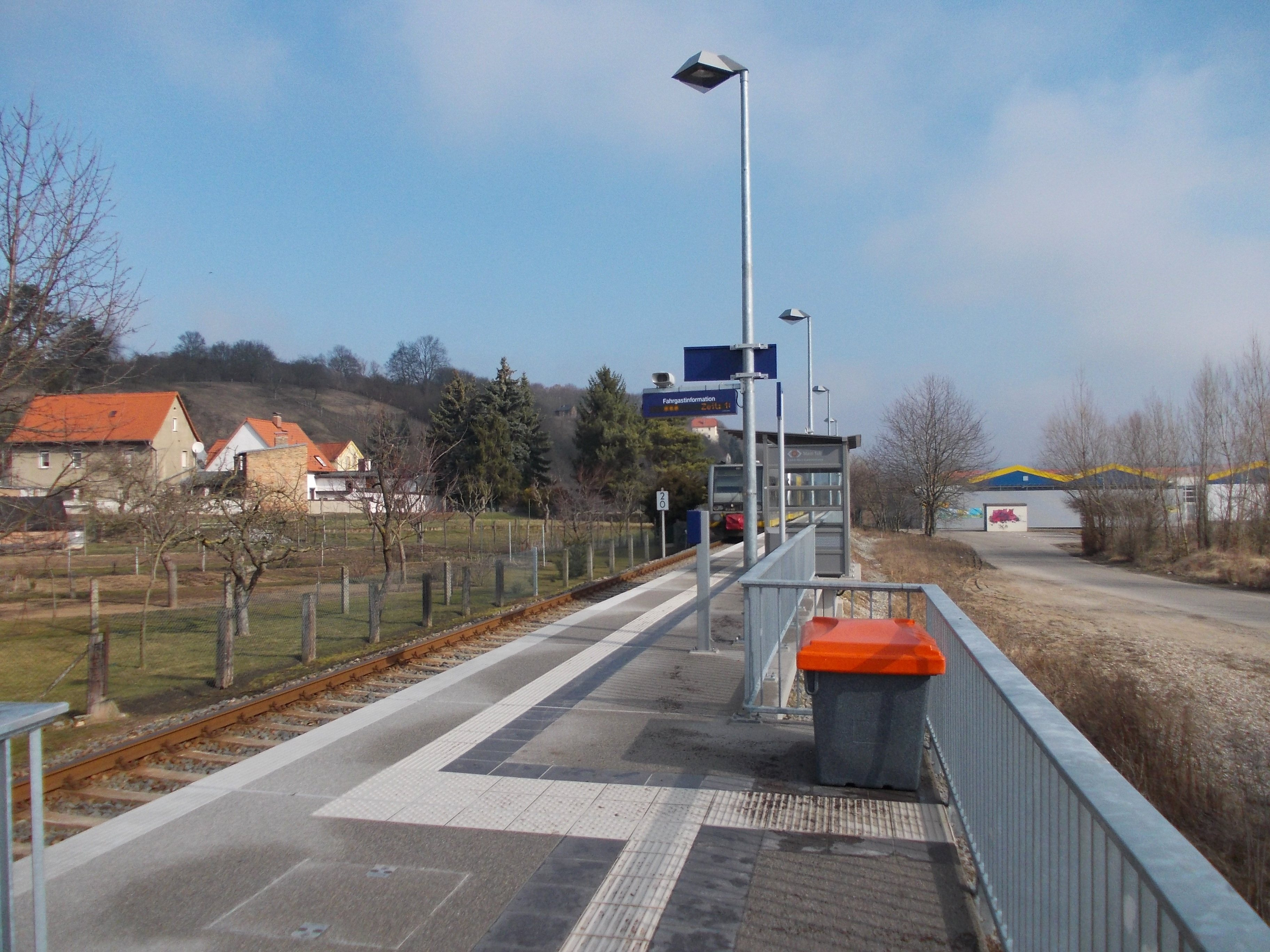
- 2013

General information
- Location: Weinstraße; 06618 Naumburg; Saxony-Anhalt; Germany
- Coordinates: 51.1707°N 11.7796°E
- Owner: DB Netz
- Operator: DB Station&Service
- Lines: Unstrut Railway (KBS 585)
- Platforms: 1 side platform
- Tracks: 1
- Train operators: Abellio Rail Mitteldeutschland

Other information
- Station code: 5357
- DS100 code: UNRO
- IBNR: 8012429
- Category: 6
- Fare zone: MDV: 255
- Website: www.bahnhof.de

History
- Opened: 10 March 2012; 14 years ago

Services
Preceding station	Abellio Rail Mitteldeutschland	Following station
Kleinjena towards Wangen	RB 77	Naumburg (Saale) Hbf towards Naumburg (Saale) Ost
Location
- Location within Saxony-Anhalt

Naumburg-Roßbach station is a railway station in the Roßbach district in the town of Naumburg, located in the Burgenlandkreis district in Saxony-Anhalt, Germany.
