= Großkorbetha station =

Railway station in Weißenfels, Germany

Großkorbetha
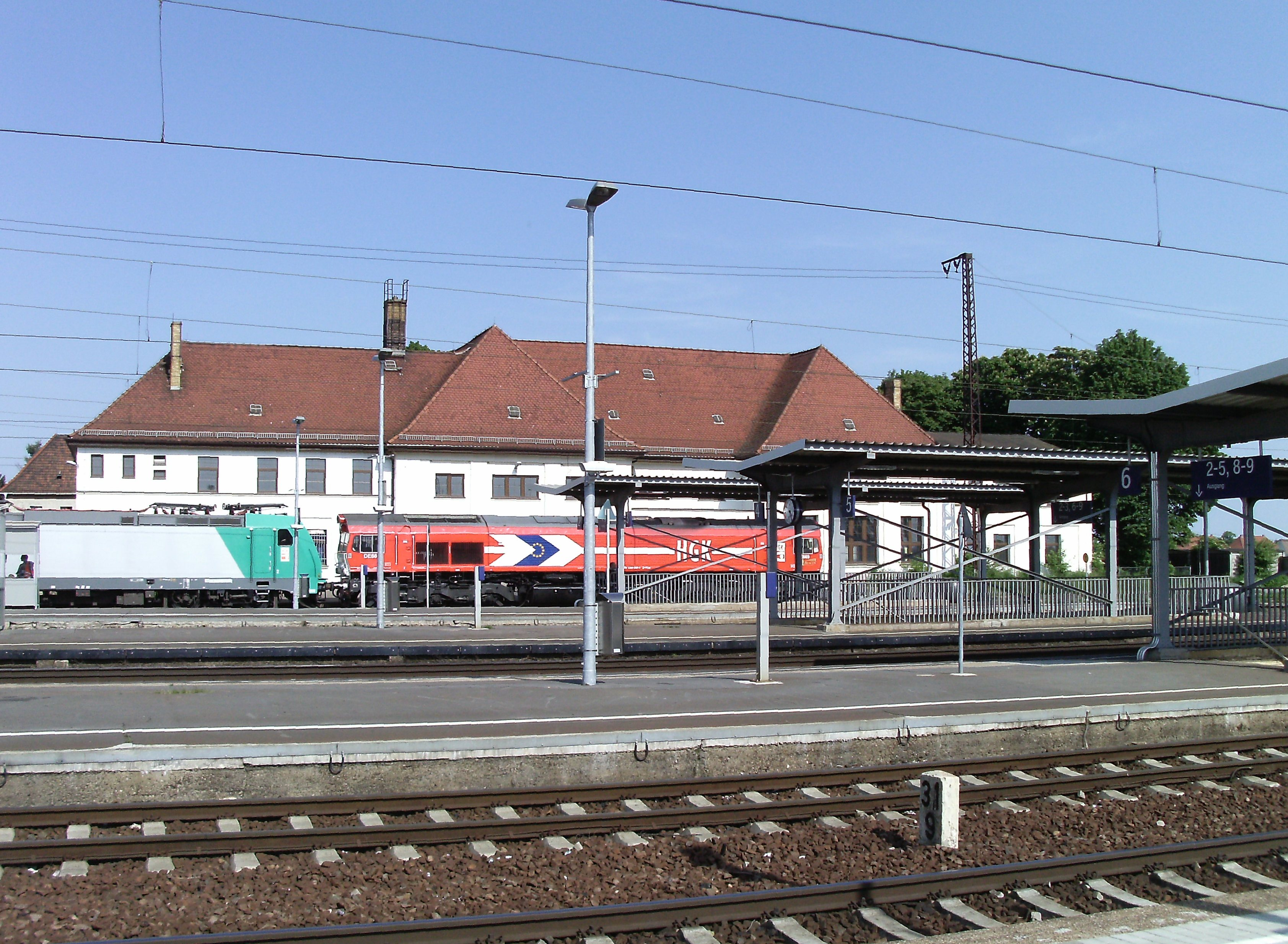
- 2012

General information
- Location: Am Bahnhof 3; 06688 Großkorbetha; Saxony-Anhalt; Germany
- Coordinates: 51.2673°N 12.0227°E
- Elevation: 110 m (360 ft)
- System: Bf
- Owner: DB Netz
- Operator: DB Station&Service
- Lines: Halle–Bebra railway (KBS 581); Leipzig–Großkorbetha railway (KBS 582); Großkorbetha–Deuben railway (KBS 554)
- Platforms: 4 island platforms 1 side platform
- Tracks: 9
- Train operators: Abellio Rail Mitteldeutschland

Other information
- Station code: 2351
- DS100 code: LGC
- IBNR: 8010146
- Category: 4
- Fare zone: MDV: 242
- Website: www.bahnhof.de

Services
Preceding station	Abellio Rail Mitteldeutschland	Following station
Weißenfels towards Eisenach	RB 20	Bad Dürrenberg towards Leipzig Hbf
Weißenfels towards Saalfeld (Saale)	RB 25	Leuna Werke Süd towards Halle (Saale) Hbf
Location
- Location within Saxony-Anhalt

Großkorbetha station is a railway station in the municipality of Großkorbetha, located in the Burgenlandkreis district in Saxony-Anhalt, Germany.
