= USZ =

USZ may refer to:

- Universitätsspital Zürich (University Hospital of Zurich), Switzerland
- University of Szczecin, Poland
- University of Szeged, Hungary
- Bad Salzungen station, a train station in Bad Salzungen, Thuringia, Germany
