= Zeitz station =

Railway station in Zeitz, Germany

Zeitz
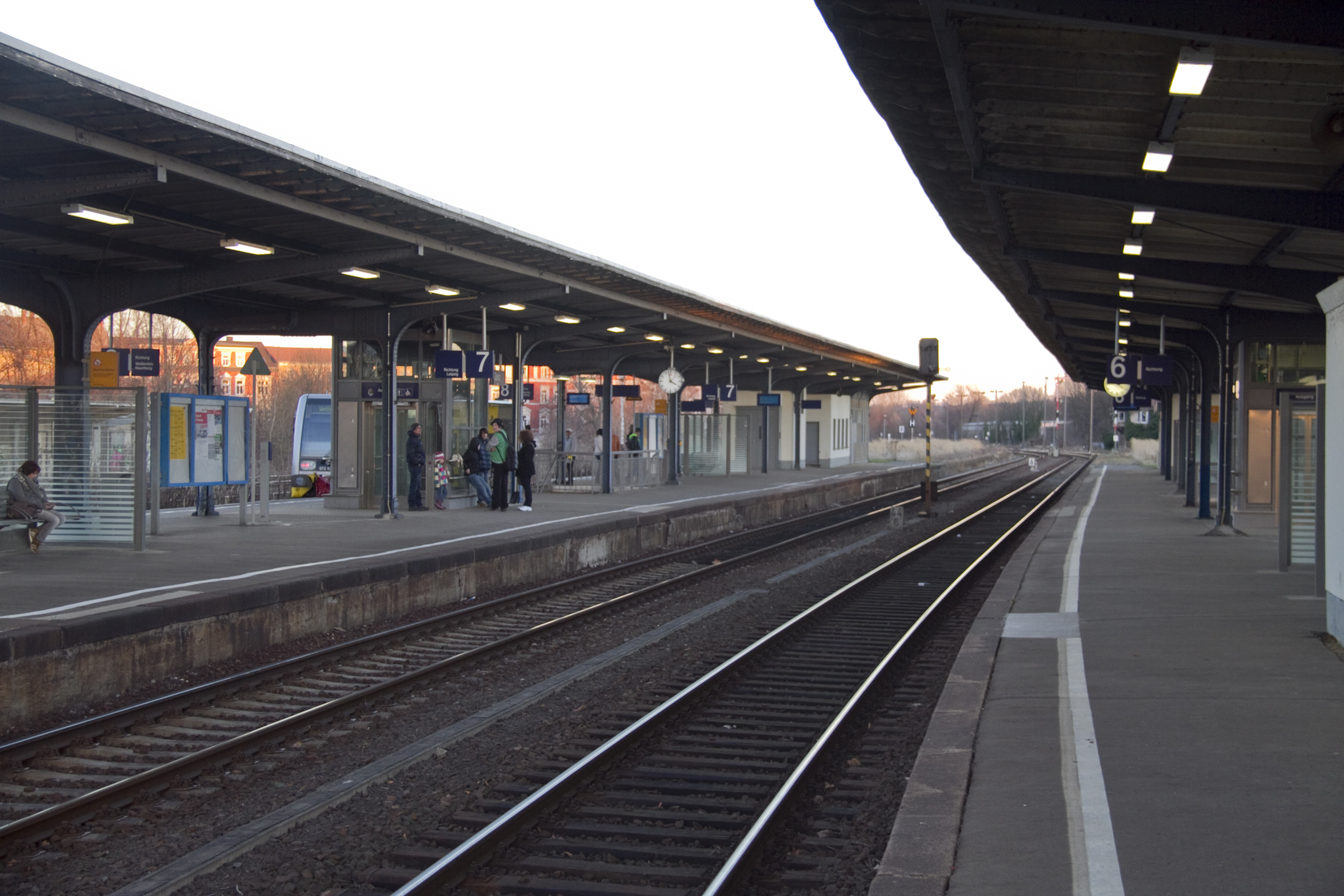
- 2013

General information
- Location: Baenschstr. 4, Zeitz, Saxony-Anhalt; Germany
- Coordinates: 51°03′23″N 12°07′53″E
- Lines: Leipzig-Leutzsch–Probstzella (km 44.66); Weißenfels–Zeitz (km 31.295); Zeitz–Altenburg (km -0.135); Tröglitz–Zeitz (km 4.695); Zeitz junction Zn–Zeitz (km 44.499); former Zeitz–Camburg (km 0.1)
- Platforms: 4

Construction
- Accessible: Yes

Other information
- Station code: 6987
- DS100 code: LZ
- IBNR: 8010390
- Category: 4
- Fare zone: MDV: 259
- Website: www.bahnhof.de

History
- Opened: 9 February 1859

Services
Preceding station		Following station
Wetterzeube towards Saalfeld (Saale)	RE 12	Profen towards Leipzig Hbf
Wetterzeube towards Saalfeld (Saale)	RB 22	Profen towards Leipzig Hbf
Preceding station	DB Regio Südost	Following station
Theißen towards Weißenfels	RB 76	Terminus
Location
- Location within Saxony-Anhalt Location within Germany Location within Europe

Zeitz station is a railway station in Zeitz, in the district of Burgenlandkreis, in the state of Saxony-Anhalt, Germany. It opened in 1859 and developed into a large railway junction, which connected to five lines. The entrance building is a heritage-listed building.

== Location ==
The station is located in the north of the town on the White Elster. It is bordered by the streets of Baenschstraße and Schadestraße. The railway towards Leipzig runs to the northeast, where the lines to Weissenfels, Altenburg and Tröglitz branch off. In the other direction, it runs southwest to Probstzella.

== History ==
The first line to Zeitz was the line from Weißenfels opened on 9 February 1859. The Zeitz–Gera section of the Leipzig–Probstzella railway was opened at the same time. With the opening of the northern section of the Leipzig–Probstzella railway, Zeitz station (officially called Zeitz Pbf, short for Personenbahnhof) received a rail connection to Leipzig on 20 October 1873.

Zeitz received another station, Zeitz Sächs. Stb. (state station), on 19 June 1872. It was the starting point of the Zeitz–Altenburg railway and was opened by the Royal Saxon State Railways (Königlich Sächsische Staatseisenbahn). This station was closed on 31 May 1913. A freight yard (Zeitz Gbf) was opened by the Prussian administration on the next day, 1 June 1913, to the north of the passenger station. The Tröglitz–Zeitz railway was opened as a connecting railway for freight traffic towards Altenburg on 1 December 1913. It operated until 30 September 2009.

The Zeitz–Camburg railway, which opened in 1897, ended in a separate Camburger Bahnhof (station to/from Camburg) until 1914 due to the heavy traffic on the tracks in Zeitz station. This station, also called the Thüringischer Bahnhof (Thuringian station), was located next to the present entrance building. After the completion of the current station building in 1912, the old station was demolished. In April 1914, the rail infrastructure in Zeitz was completely rebuilt. A common station was established.

The Dreierbrücke ("three" bridge) was built in 1879 to give access to the station over the White Elster. It was built by private investors, as the municipality of Zeitz lacked the financial resources. Initially, users were charged three Pfennige (pennies) to cross the bridge. After the municipality bought the private parts of the bridge in 1914, these tolls were abolished.

The passenger traffic on the line to Camburg was closed in 1999. The railway was closed in 2000. The passenger traffic on the Zeitz–Meuselwitz section of the railway to Altenburg was closed on 28 September 2002. The railway line to Tröglitz has operated since 12 December 2012 as a siding to the Zeitz chemical and industrial park. In September 2015, public expressions of interest were called to find suitable tenants for the building. Since the beginning of January 2016, the station has been owned by the municipality of Zeitz.

== Infrastructure ==
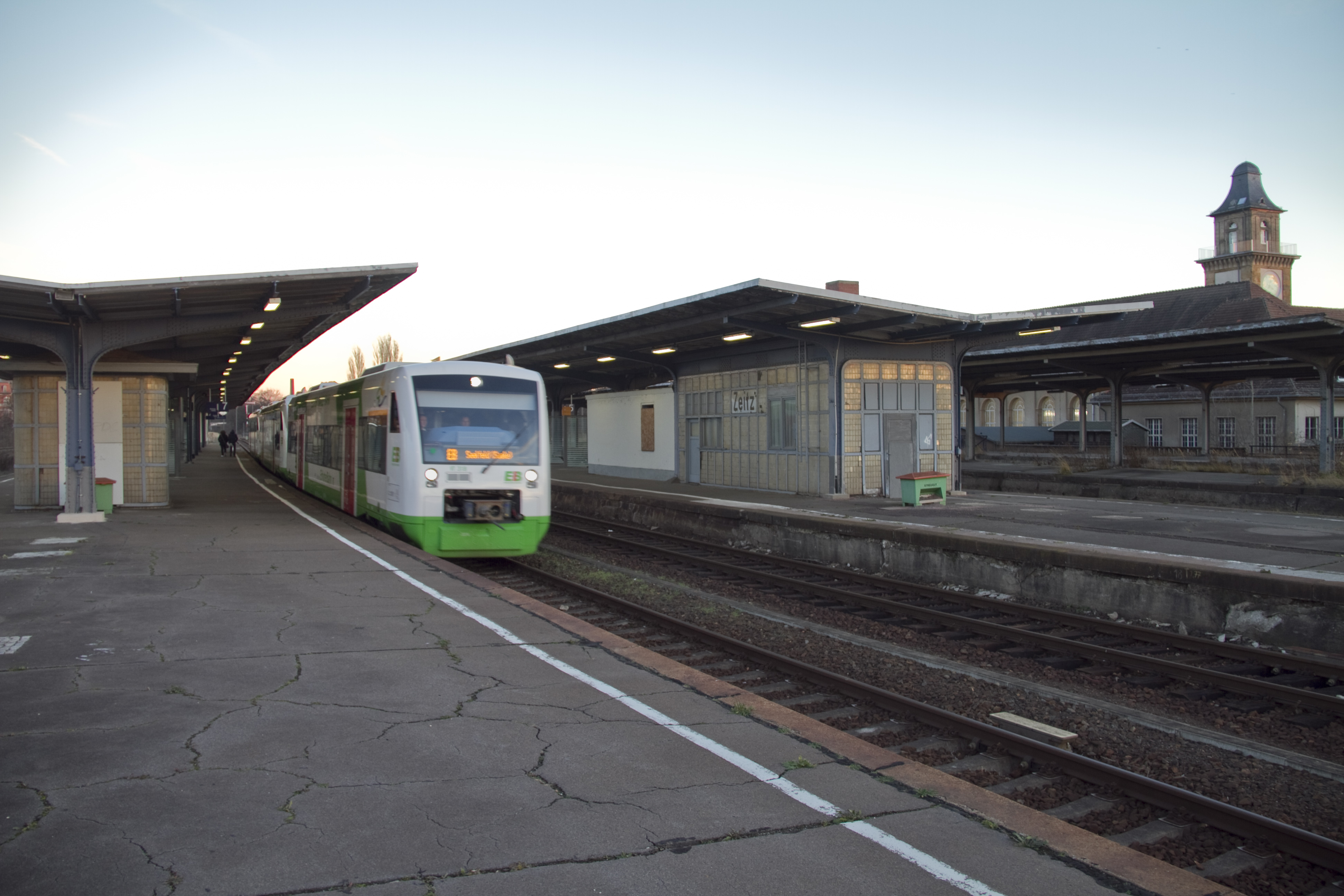
Platform

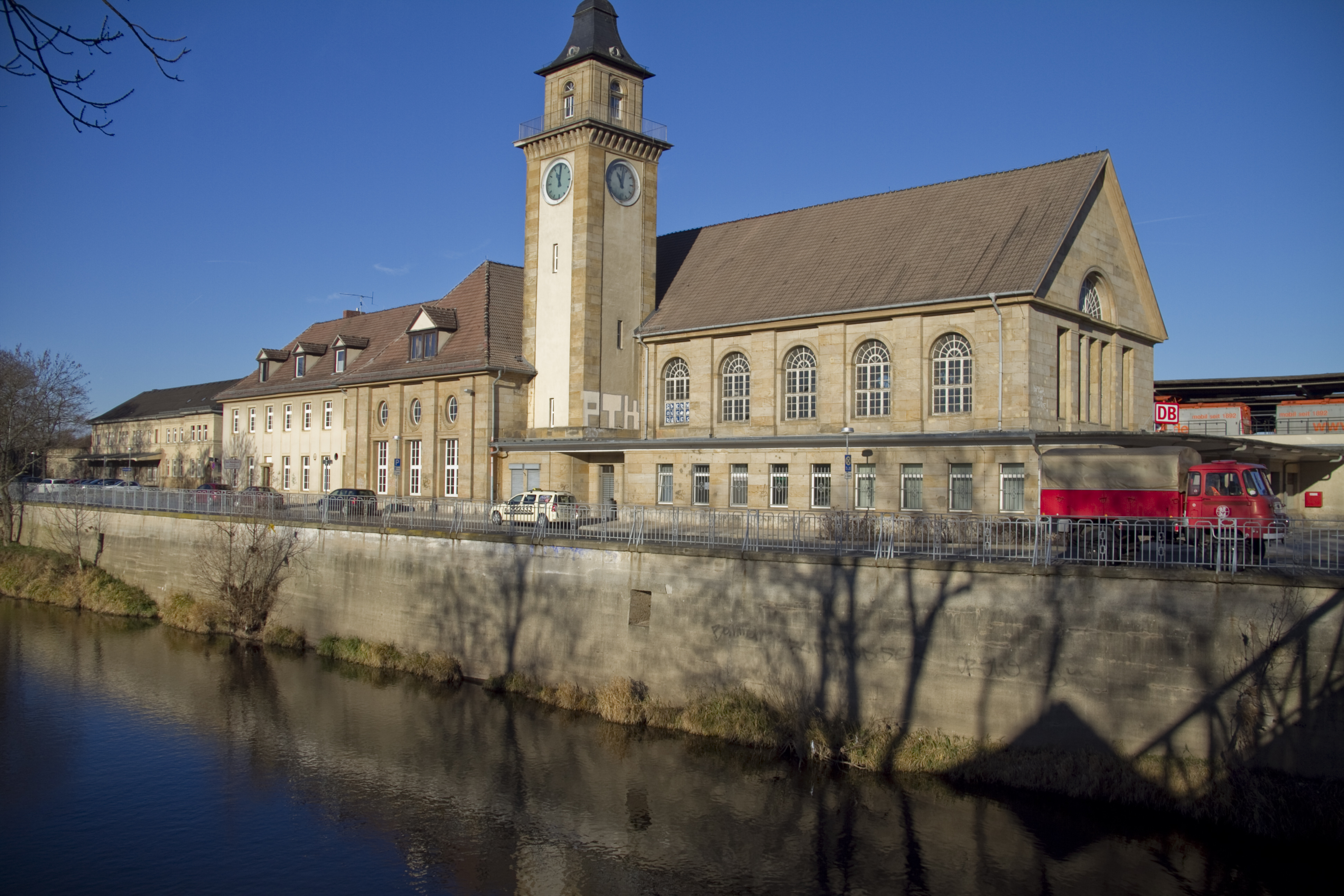
Entrance building

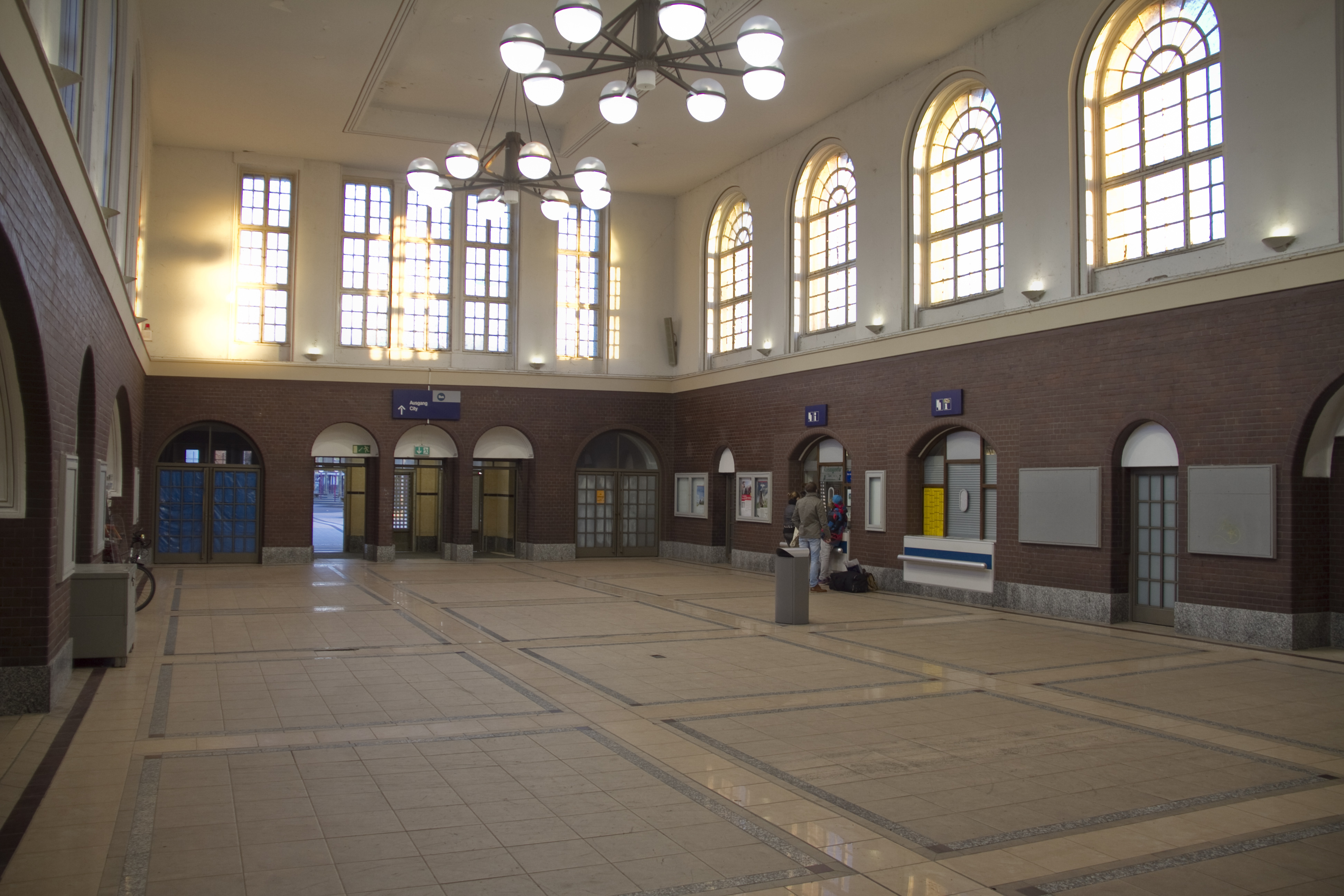
Entrance hall

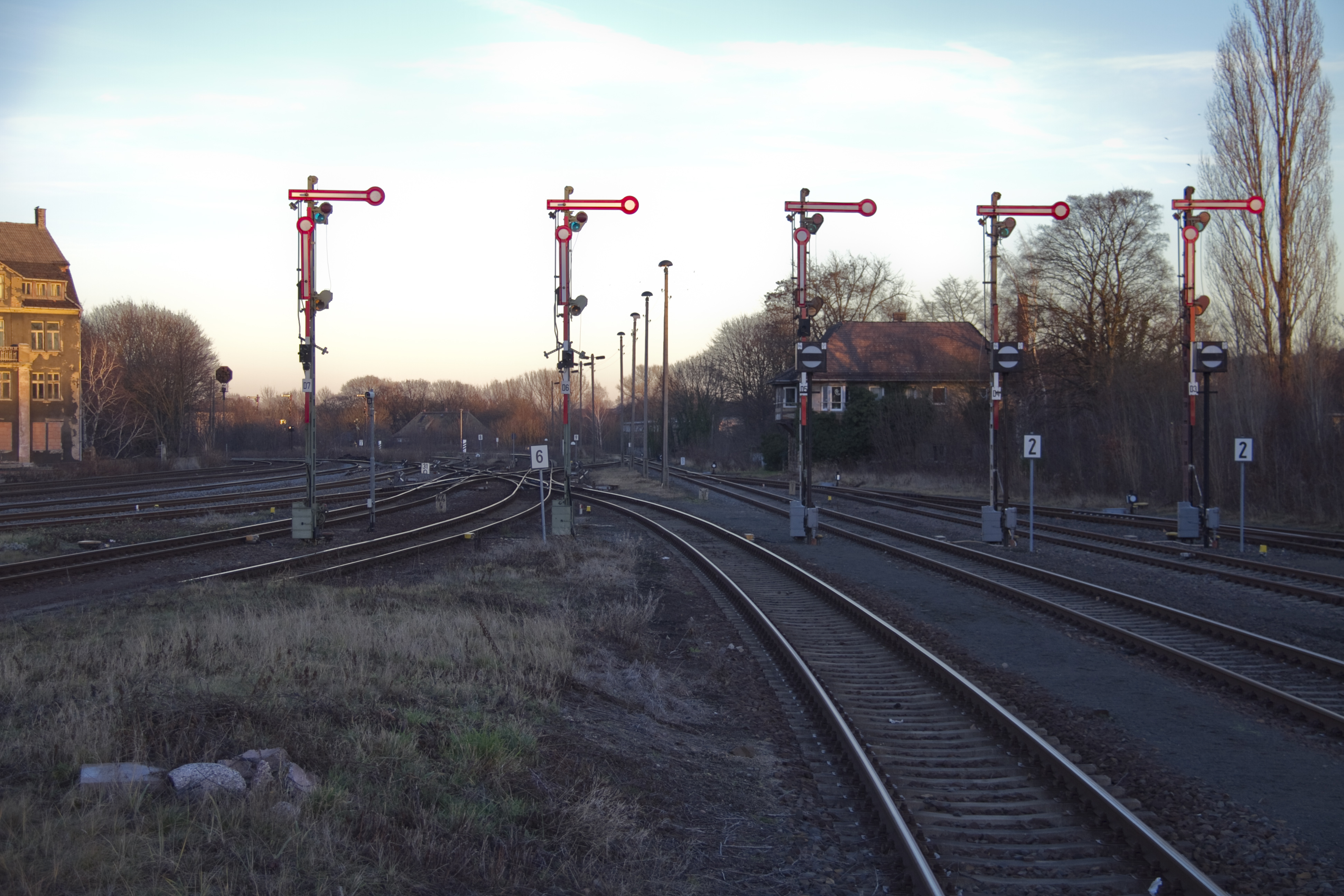
Signals

=== Platforms and tracks ===
Once the station had a total of 16 tracks (see table) and four platforms. All of them were next to island platforms. The station building is located south of these platforms. The railway administration of the Altenburg-Zeitzer Eisenbahngesellschaft (Altenburg-Zeitz Railway Company) was next to it. There were several sidings to local factories.

Track	Usable length	Track	Usable length
1	376 m	31	54 m
2	490 m	32	129 m
3	457 m	34	73 m
4	499 m	36	95 m
5	379 m	37	97 m
6	370 m	38a	650 m
7	420 m	40	110 m
8	377 m	43	50 m

Today the station has four platforms, of which only two are used. The length of the two platforms that are used is 230 and 270 metres and their tracks are numbered from five to eight. The vast majority of trains stop only on tracks seven and eight.

=== Signal boxes ===
Zeitz station has four electromechanical signal boxes of the SuH 1907 type. B2 and B7 are dispatcher boxes, while W6 and W8 are guard boxes. As is typical for this type of safe working, the tracks are protected by semaphore signals. Only the B2 box controls colour light signals.

== Transport services ==
According to estimates, about 900 to 1000 people use the station every working day.

=== Regional rail services ===
In the 2025 timetable, Zeitz station was served by the following lines:

Line	Route	Frequency (min)
RE 12	Leipzig – Zeitz – Gera – Weida – Pößneck – Saalfeld (Saale)	120
RB 22	Leipzig – Zeitz – Gera – Weida – Pößneck – Saalfeld (Saale)	120
RB 76	Zeitz – Theißen – Teuchern – Weißenfels	60 (Mon–Fri); 120 (Sat–Sun)

=== Public transport ===
Several bus routes operated by Landesnetz Sachsen-Anhalt (a state utility) start at the Zeitz bus station in the station forecourt. Their destinations are Naumburg, Meuselwitz and Profen.
