= Eisenach West station =

Railway station in Eisenach, Germany

Eisenach West
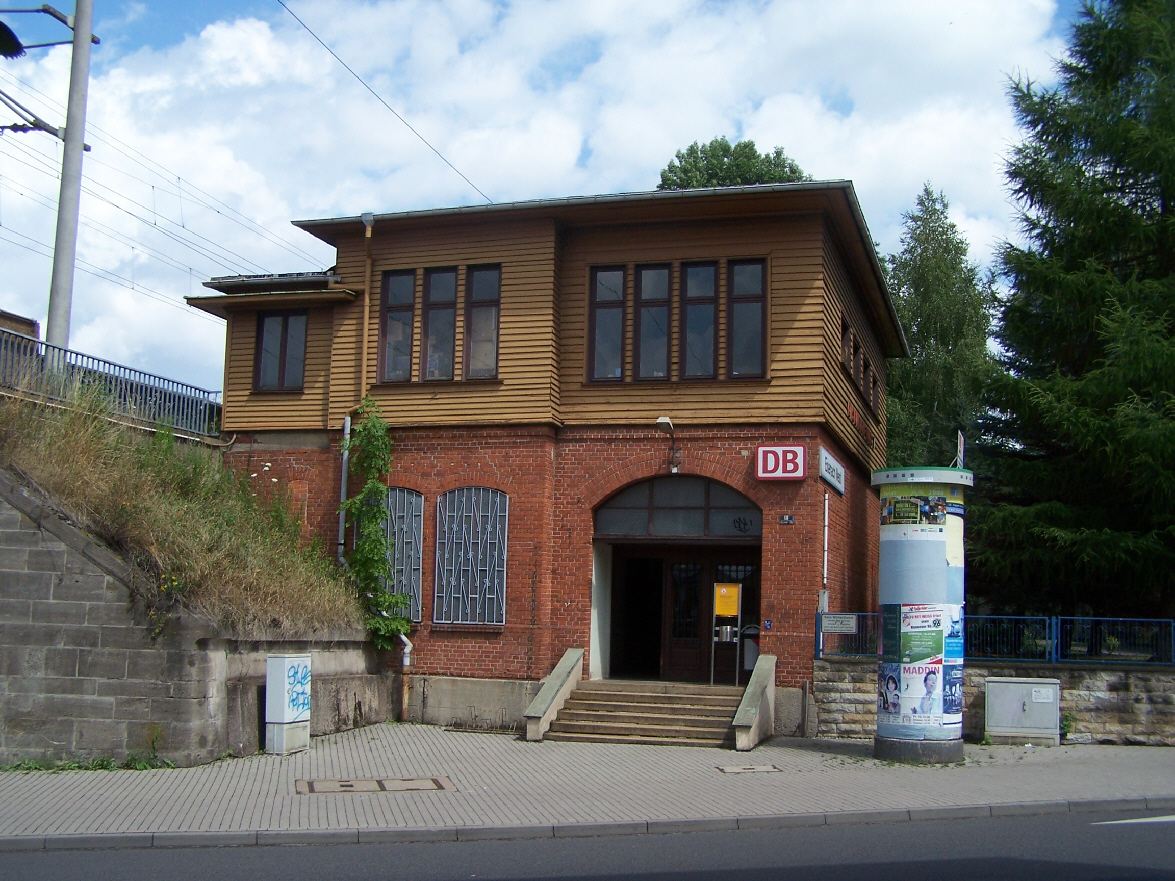
- Entrance building

General information
- Location: Kasselerstr. 18, Eisenach, Thuringia; Germany
- Coordinates: 50°58′44″N 10°18′15″E
- Owner: DB Netz
- Operator: DB Station&Service
- Lines: Halle–Bebra (KBS 605)
- Platforms: 2

Construction
- Accessible: No

Other information
- Station code: 1530
- DS100 code: UEIW
- IBNR: 8011468
- Category: 6
- Website: www.bahnhof.de

History
- Opened: 1 August 1893

Services
Preceding station	Cantus	Following station
Eisenach Opelwerke towards Bebra	RB 6	Eisenach Terminus
Location
- Location within Thuringia

Eisenach West station is a halt (Haltepunkt) on the Halle–Bebra railway (Thuringian Railway) in the town of Eisenach in the German state of Thuringia.

== History ==
=== Halt from 1893 ===
The halt of Eisenach-West was opened on 1 August 1893 at the urging of the Eisenacher Kammgarnspinnerei (Eisenach Worsted Spinning Mill), at that time the largest industrial enterprise in the city, in the immediate vicinity of the main western entrance to the company premises. The Eisenacher Elektrizitätswerk (Eisenach Electricity Works), the operator of the Eisenach Tramways, established the terminus of its Weststadt-Linie (west town line) at this convenient location, about 2.2 km west of its main station (Hauptbahnhof). The streets leading west and north were built by the municipal administration from 1900 onwards for the construction of tenements for industrial workers and therefore the West station was the heart of a newly developed suburban area north of the spinning mill.

=== The development of the station ===
Already between 1902 and 1905, with the construction of the Schwebda–Wartha railway via Creuzburg, Mihla and Treffurt, the traffic volume had increased and the operation of trains became more complicated due to the increasing density of services.

At the same time, it was necessary to raise the tracks by up to 4 m in order to be able to remove the numerous level crossings in the urban area. The town provided 500,000 marks for this first significant project of the 20th century. 10,000 m^{3} rubble masonry, 850 t of structural steel for viaducts and about 340,000 m^{3} gravel and track bed were installed on the about 4 km-long route from the Eisenach gas works to the bridge over the Hörsel at Köpping. Since then, there has been a 4 m-high wall along the Rennbahn through the Eisenach cityscape. In the course of the construction work, the West station also had to be raised to the level of the new railway and the station was given its present shape and further sets of points were added for auxiliary tracks.

=== Until 1961 ===
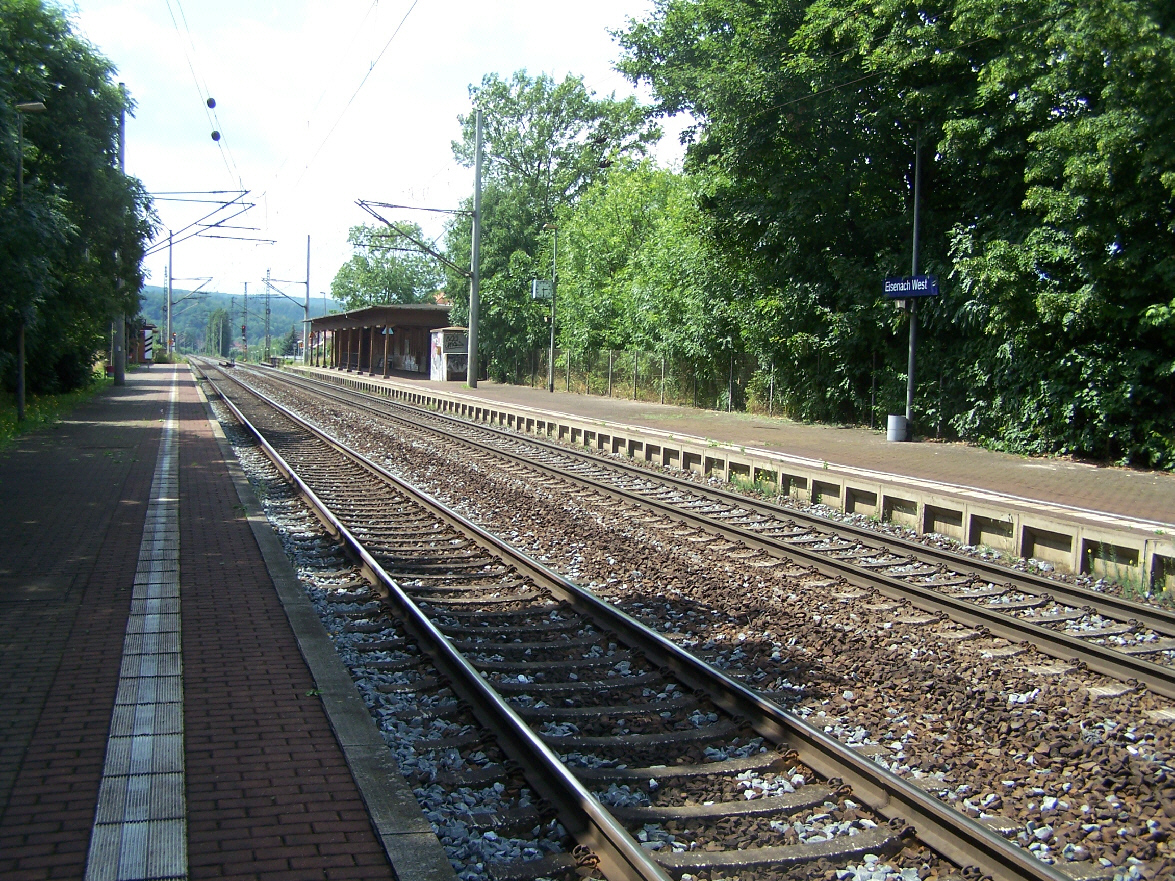
Eisenach-West platforms (2008)

During the First World War, Eisenach-West was upgraded during a reorganisation of the hierarchy of railway operations (the introduction of military express trains) to allow the substantial dismantling of the marshalling yard of Eisenach station. The urgently needed facilities of the freight yard were built in the 1920s. At the beginning of the 1930s, an industrial railway was built from the West station to the new Eisenach gasworks. From August 1939, the transport capacity was also substantially increased by the optimising of the timetables for passenger and freight trains, partly at the urging of the potash industry in the Werra potash district. A railway postal service was operated at Eisenach-West station.

During the fighting at the end of the Second World War, the railway bridge across Kasseler Straße, which is immediately west of the station, was demolished and the rail traffic stopped for a few weeks. Traffic was resumed with 20 pairs of passenger trains per day in August 1945.

The operating conditions were made extremely difficult by the political conditions, as Eisenach was not far from the inner German border and the traffic had to be coordinated with the Western occupying powers. A special arrangement for the Eisenach–Herleshausen–Gerstungen section—analogous to the Whisky-Vodka Line—could not be found. Another problem was the smuggling of goods and people. There were also police raids at the West station.

=== Decommissioning and restart ===
Only a few passenger trains remained in Eisenach-West after the construction of the Berlin Wall in August 1961. All traffic on the Wartha–Mihla line ended on 1 September 1969 and traffic on the Wartha station–Hörschel–Eisenach line ended on 25 September 1976. A shuttle service became necessary at the end of the 1980s with the construction of a new manufacturing complex of Automobilwerk Eisenach (AWE) to the west of the town (now Opel Eisenach). In the 1989/90 timetable, there were three train pairs ran on the (Gotha–)Wutha–Eisenach Hbf–Eisenach West–Eisenach AWE route.

After German Reunification, the station was rebuilt and is now a stop of line R6 from Eisenach to Bebra. Since 2 June 1991, the reconstruction and electrification of the Eisenach–Wartha–Gerstungen line was carried out step by step and the station building was extensively renovated. Hörseltalbahn GmbH (HTB) opened Eisenach-Stedtfeld station on 15 December 1992 and shortly afterwards Eisenach-Opelwerk halt was opened on 23 May 1993.

== Facilities ==
The listed station consists of two buildings, which are interconnected by a passenger subway underneath the tracks, thus enabling rapid access between the two platforms.

=== The southern building ===
The southern building was used as an entrance and service building. It allows access to the station and is located on Kasseler Straße. It is a typical railways clinker building and was optimised for the special functions of railway operations of the 1920s. A small waiting room and the ticket counter was on the ground floor and the sometimes covered platform for trains running to Erfurt was reached via steps. On the upper floor, there were staff offices, signalling and other technical apparatus; today this area is a storage room.

=== The northern building ===
On the ground floor, this subterranean building housed an external platform for the railway postal service, which was accessible from the north by a separate service and loading ramp from the Rennbahn. The railway platform towards Gerstungen was connected to the waiting area and the ticket counter via a narrow subway. An exterior staircase enabled a descent to the Rennbahn. This platform had a 20 m-long covered area for passengers. The adjoining rooms on the upper floor were used for administration and technical purposes and as a kiosk. After the closure of the entrance building of Eisenach-West station, this building became the home of the Eisenacher Modelleisenbahn-Vereins (Eisenach Model Railway Association), which erected an exhibition facility there. The building and the platform canopy were heavily damaged by a fire on 13 February 2017.

=== Platforms ===
Tracks	Length in m	Height in cm	Current use
1	136	38	Services towards Bebra
2	111	38	Services towards Eisenach
