= Weißenfels station =

Rail station in Weißenfels, Saxony-Anhalt, Germany

Weißenfels
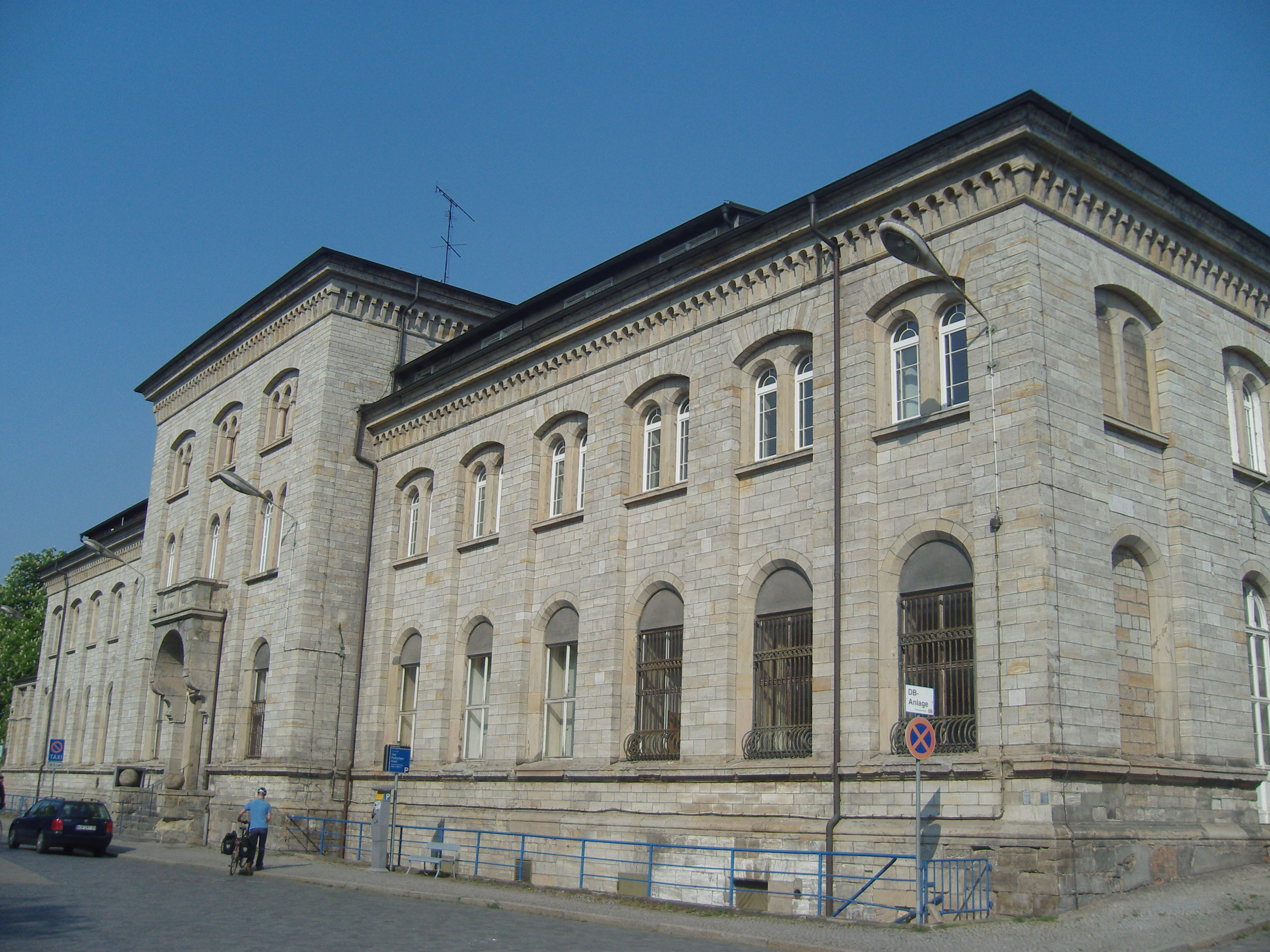
- Entrance building, street side (2011)

General information
- Location: Bahnhofstr. 2, Weißenfels, Saxony-Anhalt; Germany
- Coordinates: 51°12′17″N 11°58′16″E
- Lines: Halle–Bebra (km 31.970); Weißenfels–Zeitz (km 0.037)
- Platforms: 4

Construction
- Accessible: Yes

Other information
- Station code: 6633
- DS100 code: UW
- IBNR: 8010368
- Category: 3
- Fare zone: MDV: 241
- Website: www.bahnhof.de

History
- Opened: 6 June 1846
Services
| Preceding station | DB Fernverkehr | Following station |
|---|---|---|
| Naumburg (Saale) Hbf towards Karlsruhe Hbf | IC 61 | Leipzig Hbf Terminus |
| Preceding station | Abellio Rail Mitteldeutschland | Following station |
| Naumburg (Saale) Hbf towards Erfurt Hbf | RE 16 | Merseburg towards Halle (Saale) Hbf |
| Leißling towards Eisenach | RB 20 | Großkorbetha towards Leipzig Hbf |
| Leißling towards Saalfeld (Saale) | RB 25 | Großkorbetha towards Halle (Saale) Hbf |
| Preceding station | DB Regio Südost | Following station |
| Naumburg (Saale) Hbf towards Jena-Göschwitz | RE 18 | Merseburg Hbf towards Halle (Saale) Hbf |
| Terminus | RB 76 | Weißenfels West towards Zeitz |
| Preceding station | DB Regio Bayern | Following station |
| Naumburg (Saale) towards Nürnberg Hbf | RE 42 | Leipzig Hbf Terminus |
Location
- Location within Saxony-Anhalt Location within Germany Location within Europe

Weißenfels station is the station of Weißenfels in the German state of Saxony-Anhalt. It lies at the junction of the Halle–Bebra and the Weißenfels–Zeitz railways.

== Location ==
The station is located at line-kilometre 32.0 of the Halle–Bebra railway (measured from Halle). In addition, it is the starting point of a line to Zeitz (km 0.0).

It lies some distance north of the town centre and near the bank of the Saale. It borders the streets of Am Güterbahnhof ("at the freight yard") and Bahnhofstraße ("station street"). The line crossed state road 206 (Merseburger Straße) at the western end of the station.

Großkorbetha station is located about eight kilometres further northeast. Five kilometres to the southwest lies the halt of Leißling. The next stop on the branch line to Zeitz is at the halt of Weissenfels West, which is almost four kilometres away and is further from the town centre than Weissenfels station.

== History ==
On 6 June 1846, Weissenfels station was opened on the Halle–Bebra railway, which already had two tracks. Weißenfels was the terminus of the line until it was extended to Weimar on 1 April 1847. The line to Bebra was completed in 1849.

Plans dating from 1845 provided for the construction of the entrance building to the south near the Saale. This would have been the place where the second building, which still exists, stands. There was also a platform with two adjacent tracks. A coke shed was built in the western station area. A track plan from 1857 indicates the existence of over 30 sets of points. Furthermore, there was already a carriage shed, a roundhouse, a turntable, a water supply point and a toilet.

Initially freight traffic was dominated by lignite.

At the Merseburger Straße level crossing there was a mechanical full barrier system with four barrier arms.

The line to Zeitz was opened on 9 February 1859. This turned Weißenfels into a junction station. This involved a major reconstruction of the track infrastructure.

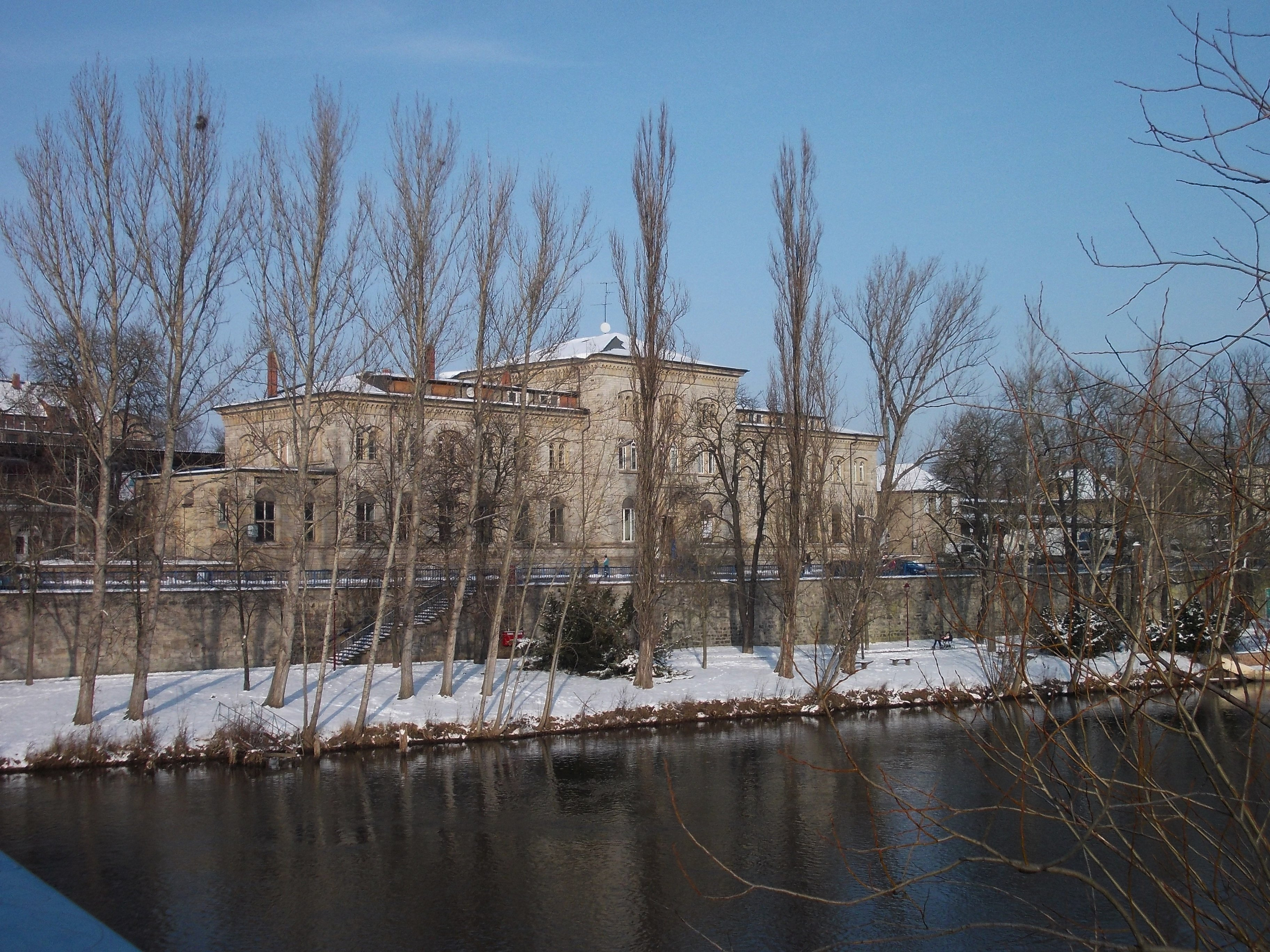
Entrance building seen from the Saale (2013)

Another reconstruction of the track infrastructure probably took place towards the end of the 1860s. New freight and loading tracks were added. The construction of a second entrance building also began. A third track from the Zeitz direction ran into the station. It ended as two dead-end tracks south of the existing platforms. The platform was also extended to accommodate the trains running from Zeitz.

Renovation of the underpass and the construction of a new platform on tracks 1 and 2 began in the 2010s, which was completed in 2013 at a cost of about €755,000. The northern platform with tracks 3 and 4 had already been modernised.

A bus station, which improved the connections between buses and rail should, was built In 2011/12.

== Infrastructure ==
=== Platforms and tracks ===
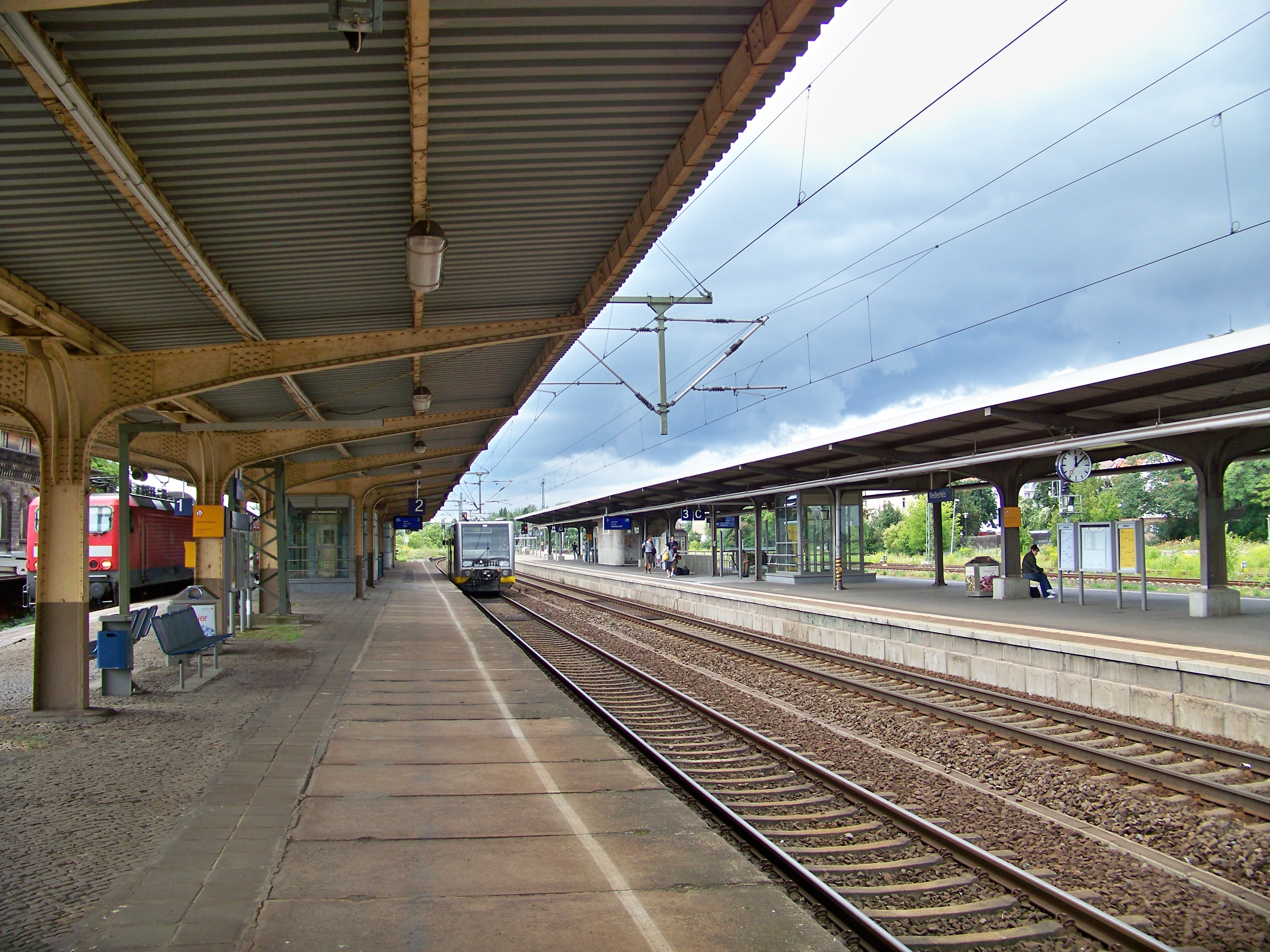
Platforms with regional trains (2009)

Currently (2017) the station has the following platforms:

| Number | Platform height | Usable length |
|---|---|---|
| 1 | 55 cm | 174 m |
| 2 | 55 cm | 174 m |
| 3 | 76 cm | 323 m |
| 4 | 76 cm | 323 m |

=== Entrance building ===
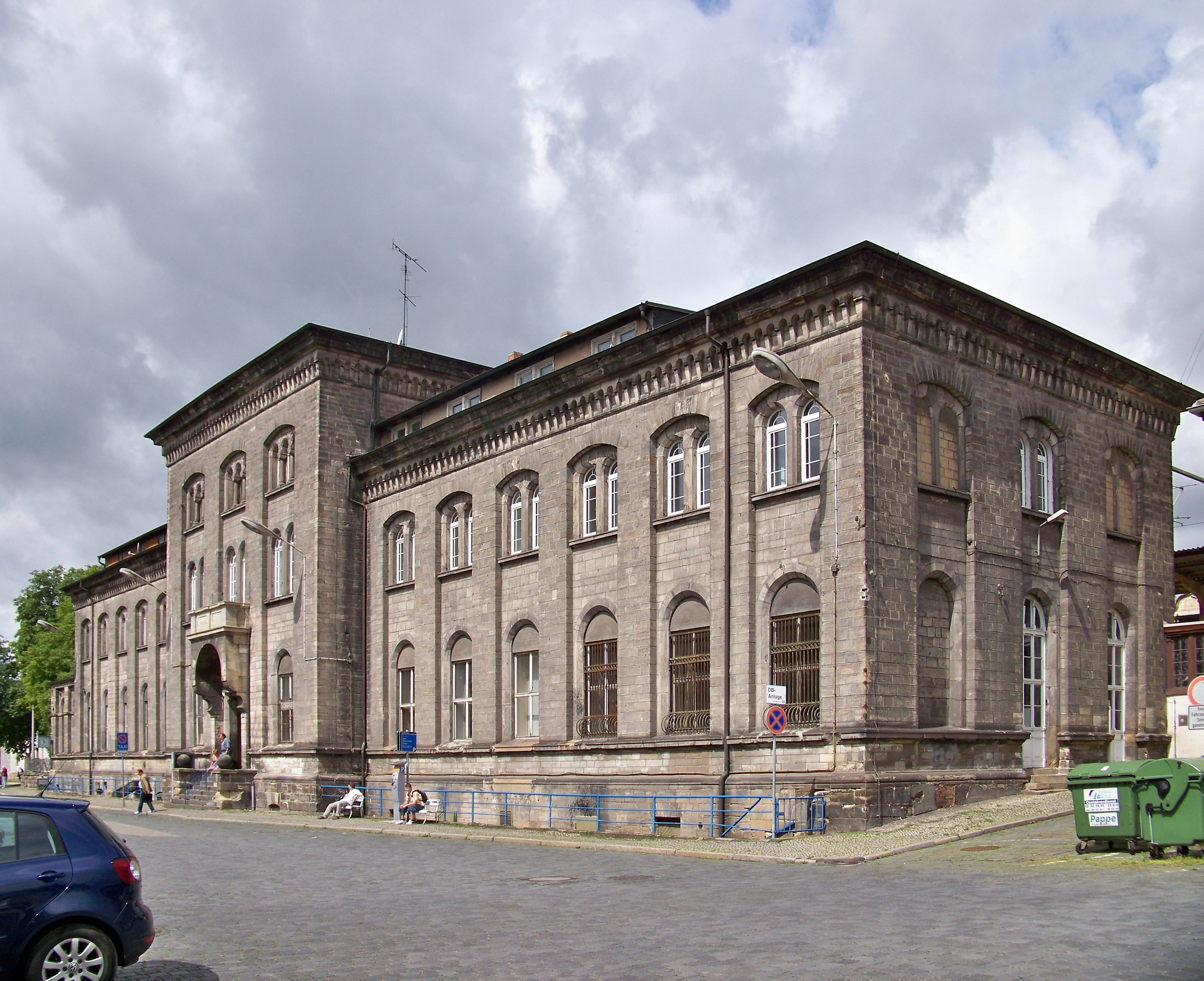
Entrance building (2009)

The entrance building is heritage listed.

The city of Weißenfels bought the entrance building from Deutsche Bahn in 2016.

The facade was restored for Sachsen-Anhalt-Tag ("Saxony-Anhalt Day", a festival formerly held annually, now every two years, in different Saxon-Anhalt towns) in 2010. The municipality of Weißenfels continues to campaign for funding from the Revita program of the state of Saxony-Anhalt for an extensive refurbishment of the building.

It is currently (2017) largely unused. A local club is considering opening a museum of Weissenfels railway history in it.

=== Signal boxes ===
Before the commissioning of the electronic interlocking the following signal boxes had been built:

| Designation | Function | Class |
|---|---|---|
| Wb | Dispatcher | |
| Wm | Guard box | S&H 1912 |
| Wo | Dispatcher | S&H 1912 |
| WrI | Guard box | S&H 1912 |
| WrII | Guard box | S&H 1912 |
| Wv | Guard box | S&H 1912 |
| Ww | Guard box | S&H 1912 |

When the signal boxes were decommissioned on 12 December 1999, a Siemens electronic interlocking went into operation on the same day, which is remotely controlled by an operations centre in Leipzig.

== Rail services ==
According to an article in the Mitteldeutsche Zeitung published in 2013, more than 3000 passengers use the station daily.

=== Long distance services ===
Weißenfels is served by two train pairs of the IC 61 each day, which runs between Karlsruhe and Leipzig.

It has been affected by the significant reduction of long-distance traffic on the section between Erfurt and Halle/Leipzig on the Halle–Bebra railway following the opening of the Erfurt–Leipzig/Halle high-speed railway in December 2015. In the past, trains stopped on the following routes:

- ICE/IC Frankfurt Rhine-Main ‹› Saxony
- IC Frankfurt Rhine-Main ‹› Berlin or Baltic Sea coast
- IC Berlin or Baltic Sea coast ‹› North Rhine-Westphalia
- IC Frankfurt Rhine-Main ‹› Magdeburg

Until 2001, Weißenfels was served by InterRegio services, which took a similar route. Until 1998, it was still served by D-Zug (traditional express) services.

=== Regional services ===
Currently, Weißenfels station is served by the following regional services:

| Line | Route | Operator | Interval (min) |
|---|---|---|---|
| RE 16 | Halle – Merseburg – Weißenfels – Naumburg – Bad Kösen – Apolda – Weimar – Erfurt | 120 | Abellio |
| RE 18 | Halle – Merseburg – Weißenfels – Naumburg – Bad Kösen – Jena Paradies – Jena-Göschwitz | 120 | DB Regio Südost |
| RE 42 | Leipzig – Weißenfels – Naumburg – Jena Paradies – Saalfeld – Lichtenfels – Bamberg – Nuremberg | 120 | DB Regio Bayern |
| RB 20 | Leipzig Hbf – Bad Dürrenberg – Weißenfels – Naumburg – Apolda – Weimar – Erfurt – Neudietendorf – Gotha – Eisenach | 60 | Abellio |
| RB 25 | Halle – Merseburg – Weißenfels – Naumburg – Jena Paradies – Saalfeld | 60 | Abellio |
| RB 76 | Weißenfels – Teuchern – Deuben – Zeitz | 60 (Mon–Fri); 120 (Sat–Sun) | DB Regio Südost |
