= Weißenfels–Zeitz railway =

Railway line in Germany

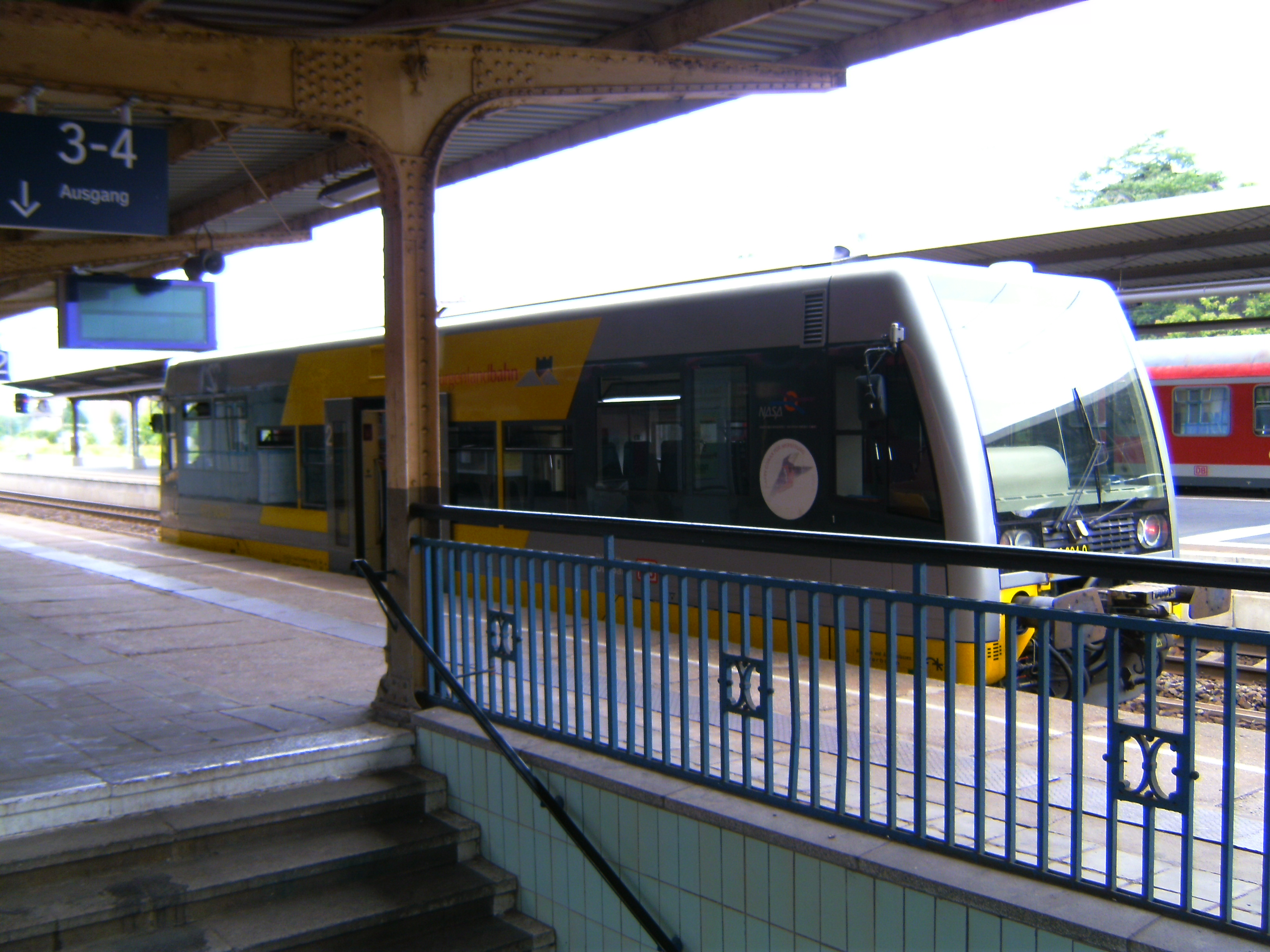
- Burgenlandbahn train in Weißenfels

Overview
- Line number: 6306
- Locale: Saxony-Anhalt, Germany

Service
- Route number: 551

Technical
- Line length: 31.3 km (19.4 mi)

The Weißenfels–Zeitz railway is a single-track main line railway in the south of the German state of Saxony-Anhalt. It runs from Weißenfels via Teuchern to Zeitz. It was one of the main lines of the networks of Burgenlandbahn, a subsidiary of DB Regio, and is now served by DB Regio Südost.

== History ==
The Weißenfels–Zeitz line was opened in 1859 between Weißenfels, Zeitz and Gera. Today, it connects the Eisenach–Erfurt–Naumburg–Halle mainline railway (Thuringian Railway, German: Thüringer Bahn) and the Leipzig–Probstzella line with each other. In its early days the line was used mainly to transport manufactured goods from Zeitz to Halle and Erfurt.

During the existence of East Germany (1949–1990), the line was used to transport sugar beet from the Thuringian Basin, cement from Karsdorf and coal from the region around Profen. The line was also used as a diversion route for the Thuringian Railway. So in the 1980s numerous international freight and express passenger trains ran between Weißenfels and Teuchern while the Thuringian Railway was being upgraded between Naumburg and Weissenfels.

== Route ==
West of Weißenfels station the line branches off the main Thuringian Railway running towards Naumburg and both lines cross the Saale on separate but parallel bridges. The line runs west to the Weißenfels district of Beuditz and then makes a full arc (with a diameter of about 1,000 metres) to the south and east. The route turns south, passes Langendorf and reaches Prittitz station in northern Prittitz. From there the line runs southeast, passing under the A 9 highway and reaches Teuchern, where the Naumburg–Teuchern line joins from the south-west. Between Teuchern and Deuben the line used to connect with the now partly disused Großkorbetha–Pörsten–Hohenmölsen–Deuben line. In Deuben the line connects with lines serving the lignite industry (including a briquette factory and a power plant) of the Mitteldeutsche Braunkohlengesellschaft ("Central German Brown Coal Company"). Then the line runs around the historic Louise mine at Theissen. The nearby level crossing of state road 191 often produced traffic jams in the 1990s. The line curves to the right and joins the double-track Leipzig–Gera line, which runs south and through the valley of the White Elster. Near Zeitz station the line crosses the access line to Zeitz-Aylsdorf marshalling yard, where the Altenburg–Meuselwitz–Zeitz line starts.
