= Bad Kösen station =

Railway station in Bad Kösen, Germany

Bad Kösen
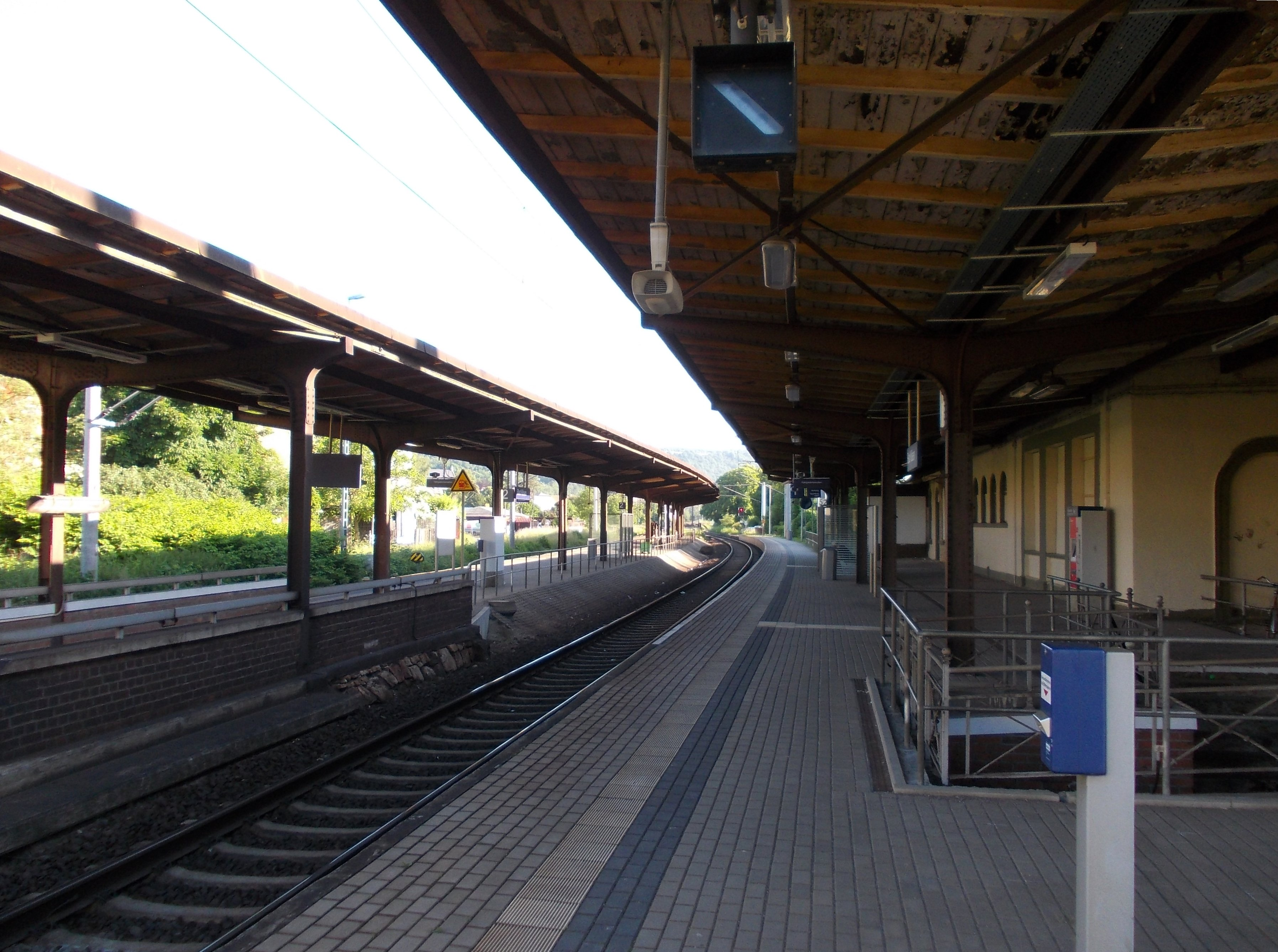
- 2013

General information
- Location: Bahnhofstraße 2; 06628 Bad Kösen; Saxony-Anhalt; Germany
- Coordinates: 51.1306°N 11.7185°E
- System: Bf
- Owner: DB Netz
- Operator: DB Station&Service
- Lines: Thuringian Railway (KBS 580)
- Platforms: 2 side platforms
- Tracks: 2
- Train operators: Abellio Rail Mitteldeutschland; DB Regio Südost

Other information
- Station code: 294
- DS100 code: UKO
- IBNR: 8010019
- Category: 5
- Fare zone: MDV: 253
- Website: www.bahnhof.de

Services
Preceding station	Abellio Rail Mitteldeutschland	Following station
Großheringen towards Erfurt Hbf	RE 16	Naumburg (Saale) Hbf towards Halle (Saale) Hbf
Großheringen towards Erfurt Hbf	RE 17	Naumburg (Saale) Hbf towards Leipzig Hbf
Großheringen towards Eisenach	RB 20	Naumburg (Saale) Hbf towards Leipzig Hbf
Camburg (Saale) towards Saalfeld (Saale)	RB 25	Naumburg (Saale) Hbf towards Halle (Saale) Hbf
Preceding station	DB Regio Südost	Following station
Jena Paradies towards Jena-Göschwitz	RE 18	Naumburg (Saale) Hbf towards Halle (Saale) Hbf
Location
- Location within Saxony-Anhalt Location within Germany Location within Europe

Bad Kösen station is a railway station in the spa town of Bad Kösen, located in the Burgenlandkreis district in Saxony-Anhalt, Germany.
