= Bad Salzungen station =

Railway station in Bad Salzungen, Germany

Bad Salzungen
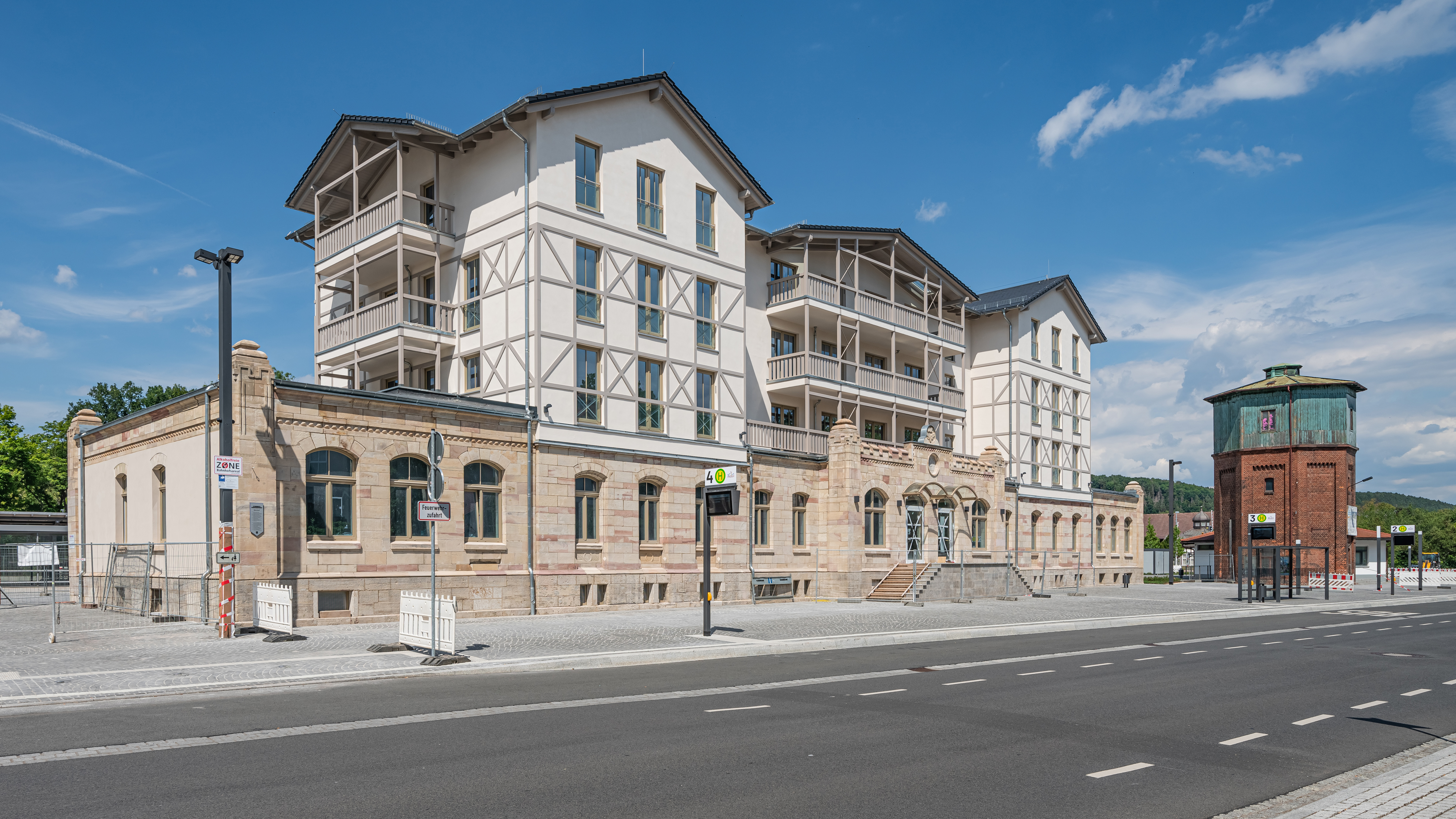
- Former entrance building and water tower (right)

General information
- Location: Bahnhofstr. 6, Bad Salzungen, Thuringia; Germany
- Coordinates: 50°48′54″N 10°13′46″E
- Lines: Werra Railway; Werra Valley Railway
- Platforms: 2 (formerly 5)

Construction
- Accessible: Yes

Other information
- Station code: 333
- DS100 code: USZ
- IBNR: 8010021
- Category: 6
- Website: www.bahnhof.de

History
- Opened: 1858

Services
Preceding station		Following station
Oberrohn towards Eisenach	RB 41	Immelborn towards Neuhaus am Rennweg
Location
- Location within Thuringia Location within Germany Location within Europe

Bad Salzungen station is the railway station of the town of Bad Salzungen in the German state of Thuringia. It is located on the Werra Railway and on the Werra Valley Railway.

== History ==
Bad Salzungen station was opened in 1858 by the private Werra Railway Company (Werra-Eisenbahn-Gesellschaft) and soon developed into a hub on the Werra Railway. Its importance continued to grow with the opening in 1879 of the first metre-gauge railway in Germany, the nearby Dorndorf–Kaltennordheim railway (Feldabahn or Felda Railway), the opening in 1889 of the line to Liebenstein-Schweina, which branched off in the neighbouring Immelborn station, and the steadily increasing potash production in the nearby Werra potash district. Therefore the Felda Railway was converted to standard gauge in sections from 1906 until 1934.

Bad Salzungen station was expanded to include an extensive marshalling yard. In addition to a further connecting line for a cold rolling mill, Deutsche Reichsbahn also built a wagon maintenance workshop (Wagenaufarbeitung, WAS) for the carrying out the most urgent work on freight wagons. A freight train was operated for Deutsche Post, started in Bad Salzungen and running on the Bad Salzungen–Zella-Mehlis–Gräfenthal–Gotha route to the postal platform opposite the main post office.

Bad Salzungen was also important for passenger transport, but for a long time the station was only an intermediate station for express trains to Bad Liebenstein. The semi-fast and express trains towards Zwickau only started at Bad Salzungen station after the branch line to Bad Liebenstein had been closed. In the 1980s, a so-called Bauarbeiter-D-Zug (construction workers express) was established, which always took construction workers to Berlin just after midnight on Mondays to work on the East German housing program (Wohnungsbauprogramm). This was the only high-quality passenger service on the middle part of the Werra Railway.

After the fall of the GDR, goods traffic almost collapsed, only the potash traffic remained until 1999. However, when the last Thuringian potash plant in Unterbreizbach received a connection via Heringen, only occasional timber traffic remained. Only scrap or rags were transported on the connecting track from the former potash operation in Merkers.

Since 2001, the Süd-Thüringen-Bahn (STB) has operated passenger services on the line. Trains runs over the whole Werra Railway hourly from Eisenach to Eisfeld and continue every two hours over the Eisfeld-Sonneberg railway via Sonneberg to Neuhaus am Rennweg. There are also some additional peak hour services to Eisenach. The STB continued to run railcars to Vacha for half a year until rail passenger services on the line ended in 2001.

It was announced in 2010 that the town of Bad Salzungen would acquire the station building and the freight yard area. In addition, timber loading would to be shifted to Merkers and a shopping centre of the Kaufland retail chain would be built in the area of the former freight yard. Timber loading has been carried out in Merkers and Dorndorf since 2011. The former freight yard was demolished in early 2015 and the construction of the shopping centre was scheduled for 2015.

In November 2014, Deutsche Bahn began to provide barrier-free access to platforms 3 and 4, the only platforms still used for passenger services. As part of the construction carried out for the renewal of Bad Salzungen station by the end of 2015, Deutsche Bahn has provided funding of €2.3 million to the state of Thuringia. Two lifts were built to provide step-free access to the platform and the new platform was also equipped with a direction signs, platform information, tactile paving as well as platform information monitors.

== Platforms ==
Platform	Length in m	Height in cm
3	132	55
4	132.5	55

== Gallery ==
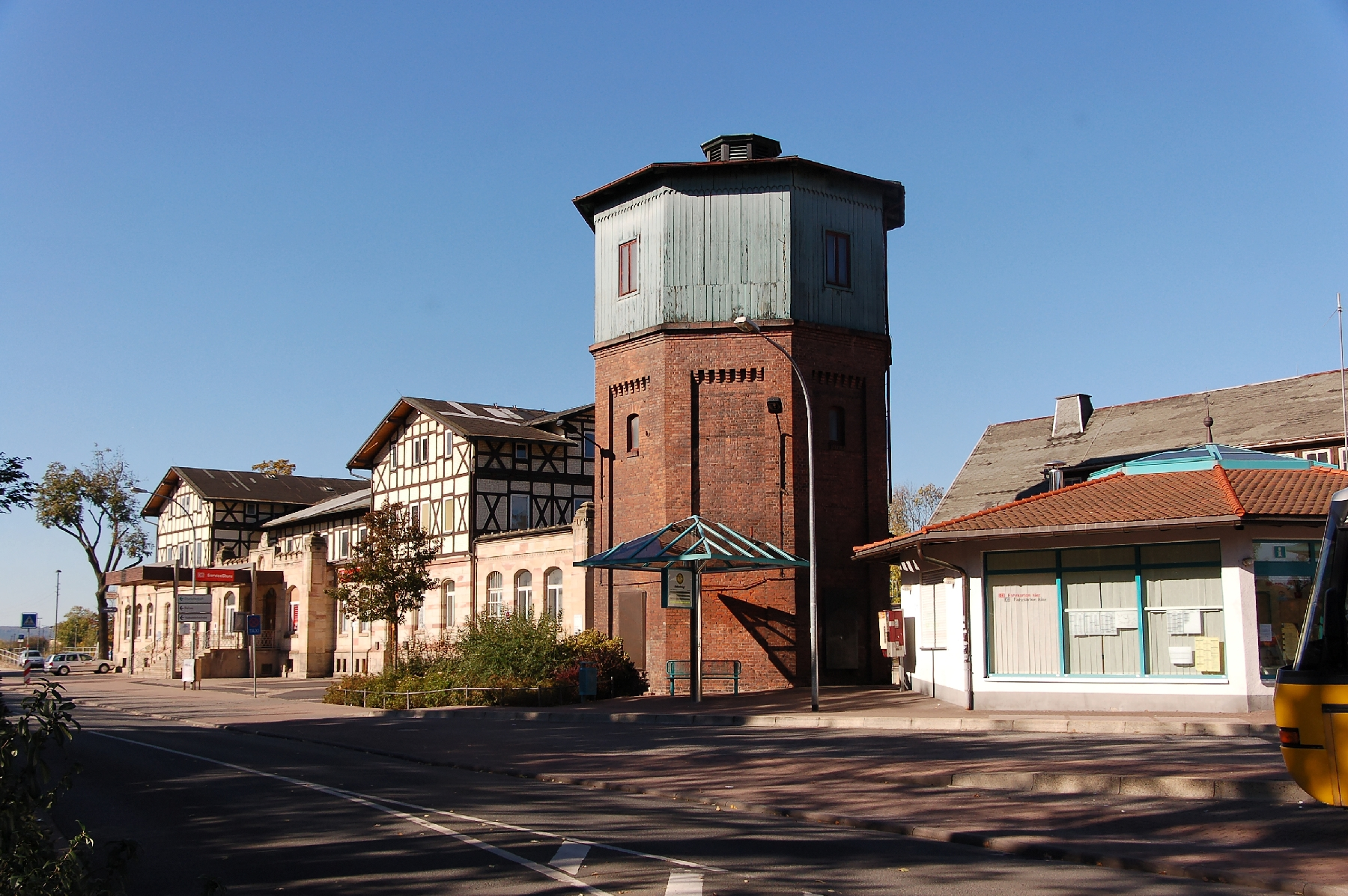
Street side

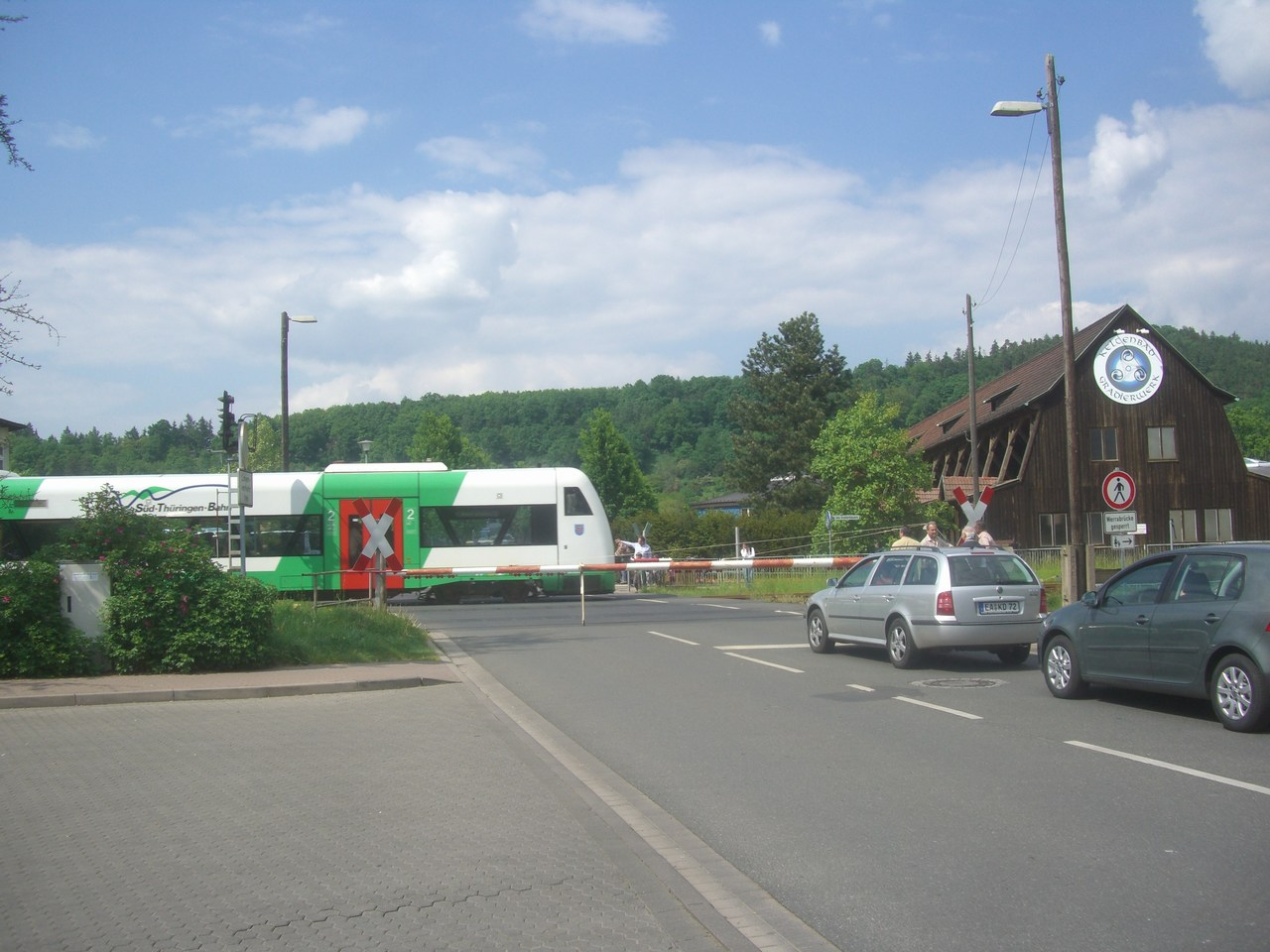
Level crossing at the eastern end of the station

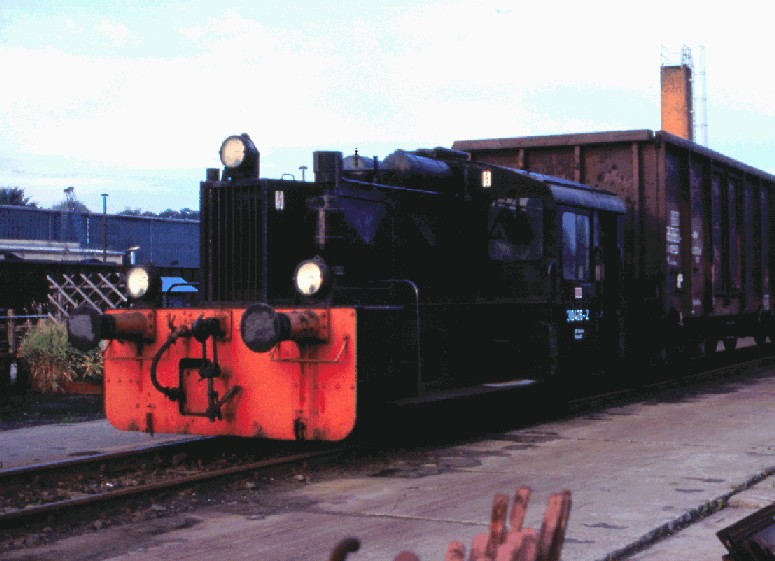
Former Bad Salzungen wagon maintenance workshop

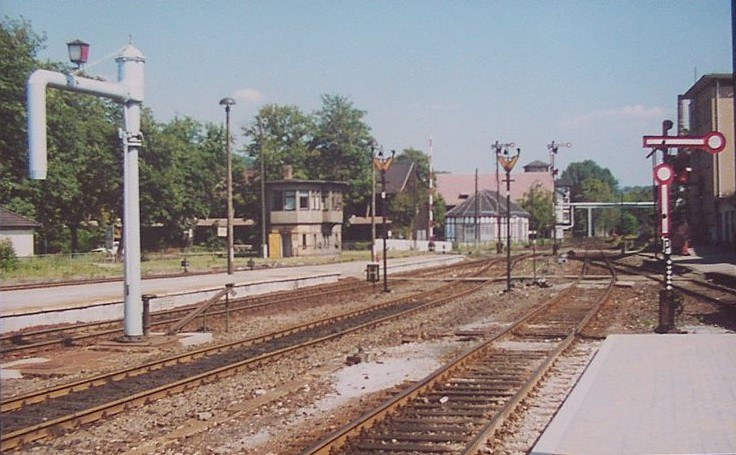
Station exit towards Meiningen (1991)
