= Naumburg (Saale) Ost station =

Railway station

Naumburg (Saale) Ost
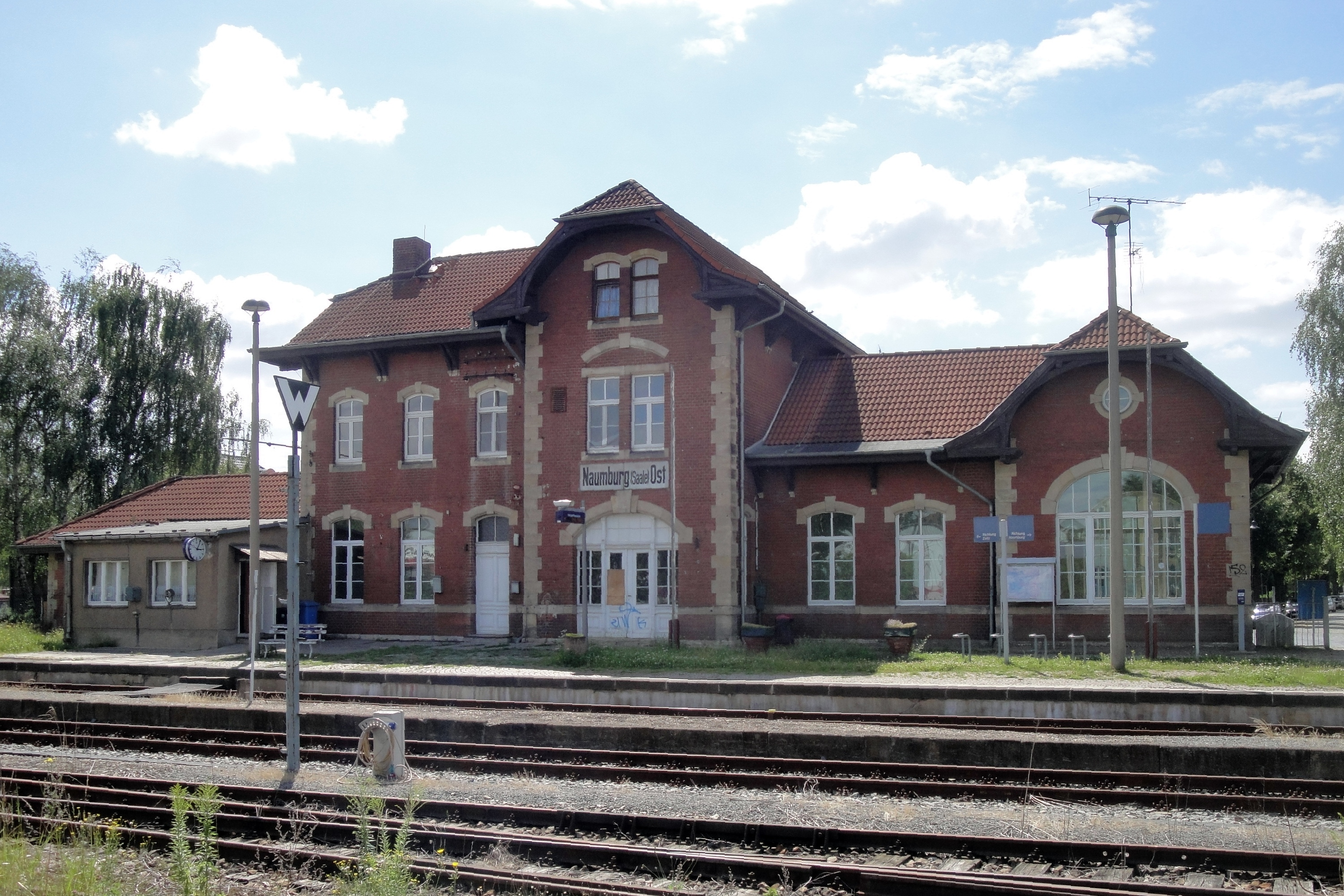
- 2012

General information
- Location: Am Ostbahnhof 1; 06618 Naumburg; Saxony-Anhalt; Germany
- Coordinates: 51.1554°N 11.8237°E
- Owner: Zossen Rail Betriebsgesellschaft
- Operator: Zossen Rail Betriebsgesellschaft
- Lines: Naumburg–Teuchern railway (KBS 551)
- Platforms: 1 side platform
- Tracks: 2
- Train operators: Abellio Rail Mitteldeutschland

Other information
- Station code: 4310
- DS100 code: UNMO
- IBNR: 8012415
- Category: 6
- Fare zone: MDV: 255

Services
Preceding station	Abellio Rail Mitteldeutschland	Following station
Naumburg (Saale) Hbf towards Wangen	RB 77	Terminus
Location
- Location within Saxony-Anhalt

Naumburg (Saale) Ost station is a railway station in the eastern part in the town of Naumburg, located in the Burgenlandkreis district in Saxony-Anhalt, Germany.
