= Eisenach Hauptbahnhof =

Railway station in Eisenach, Germany

Eisenach Hbf
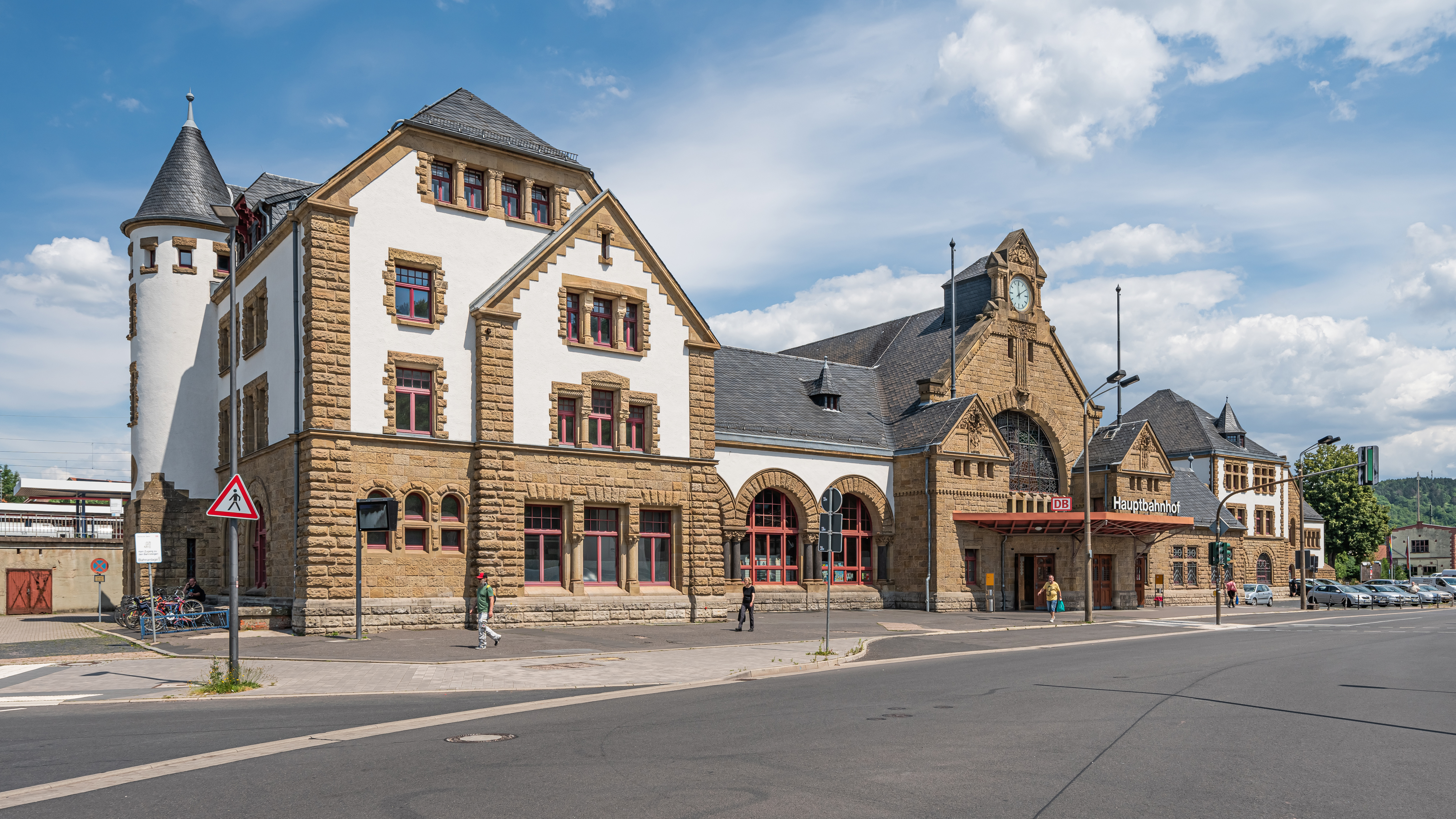

General information
- Location: Bahnhofstr. 35, Eisenach, Thuringia; Germany
- Coordinates: 50°58′35″N 10°19′53″E
- Owner: Deutsche Bahn
- Operator: DB Station&Service
- Lines: Thuringian Railway; Werra Railway
- Platforms: 6

Construction
- Accessible: Yes

Other information
- Station code: 1528
- DS100 code: UEI
- IBNR: 8010097
- Category: 3
- Website: www.bahnhof.de

History
- Opened: 1846/1900

Passengers
- 5000

Services
Preceding station	DB Fernverkehr	Following station
Fulda towards München Hbf	ICE 11	Erfurt Hbf towards Berlin Gesundbrunnen
Terminus	ICE 15	Gotha towards Ostseebad Binz
Terminus	ICE 18	Gotha towards Hamburg-Altona
Fulda towards Wiesbaden Hbf	ICE 50	Gotha towards Dresden Hbf
Kassel-Wilhelmshöhe towards Köln Hbf	IC 51	Erfurt Hbf towards Gera Hbf
Preceding station		Following station
Fulda towards Stuttgart Hbf	FLX 10	Gotha towards Berlin Hbf
Preceding station	Abellio Rail Mitteldeutschland	Following station
Terminus	RB 20	Wutha towards Leipzig Hbf
Preceding station	Cantus	Following station
Eisenach West towards Bebra	RB 6	Terminus
Preceding station		Following station
Förtha (Eisenach) towards Eisfeld or Sonneberg	RB 41	Terminus
Location
- Location within Thuringia Location within Germany Location within Europe

Eisenach Hauptbahnhof is the main station of the city of Eisenach in the German state of Thuringia. It is a transportation hub, located on the Thuringian Railway (Berlin/Dresden–) Halle–Bebra (–Frankfurt am Main) and at the Werra Railway (Eisenach–Meiningen–Eisfeld).

Eisenach Hauptbahnhof (Hbf) is classified by Deutsche Bahn as a category 3 station. Effectively 15 December 2024, alongside Halberstadt Hauptbahnhof, Deutsche Bahn has officially changed Eisenach's station name into Eisenach Hauptbahnhof.

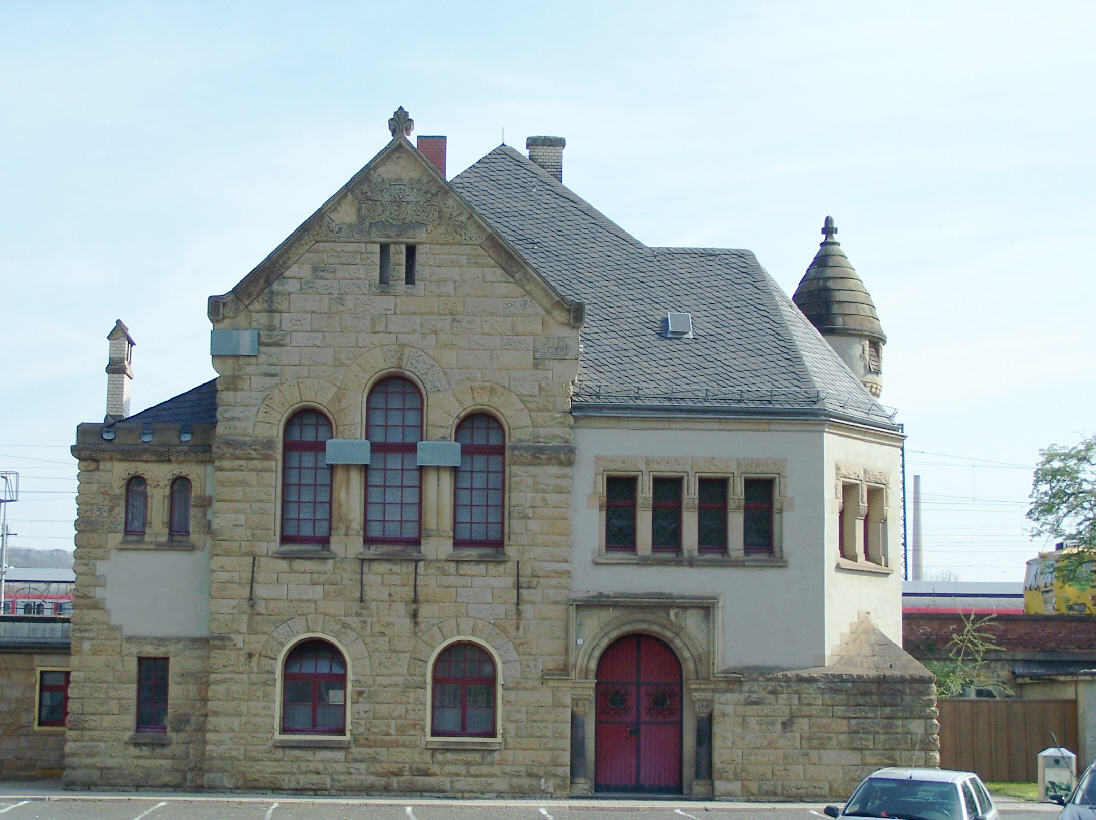
Fürstenbahnhof (station for the aristocracy)

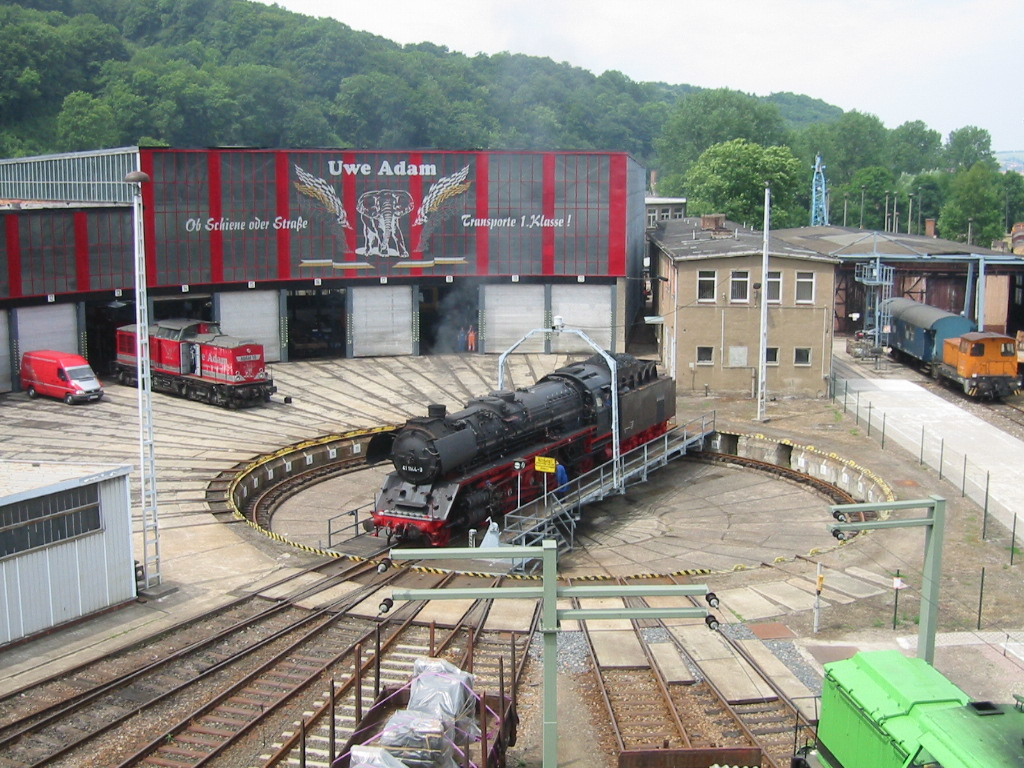
Roundhouse

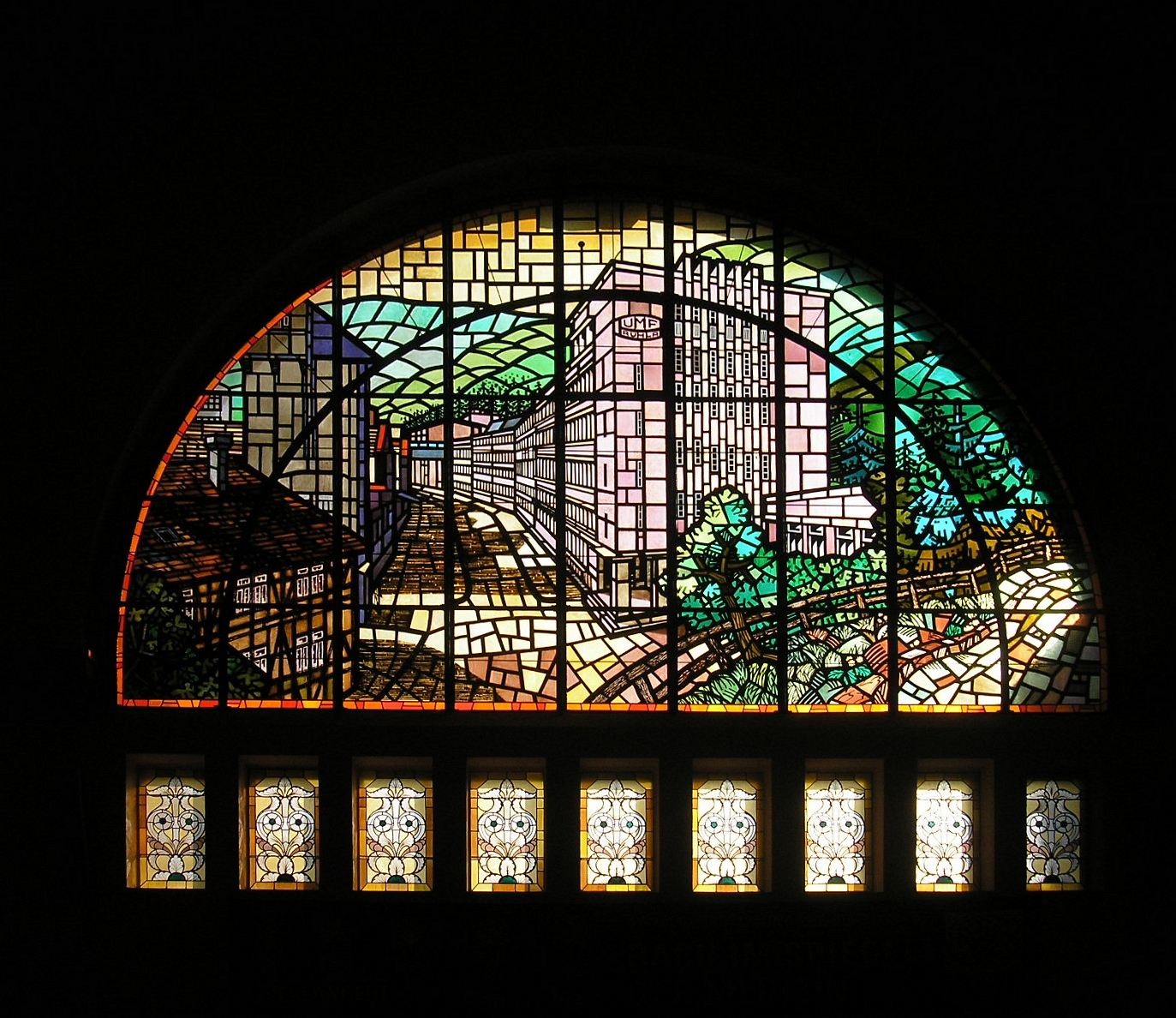
Stained glass representation of the Ruhla watch factory in the station entrance hall

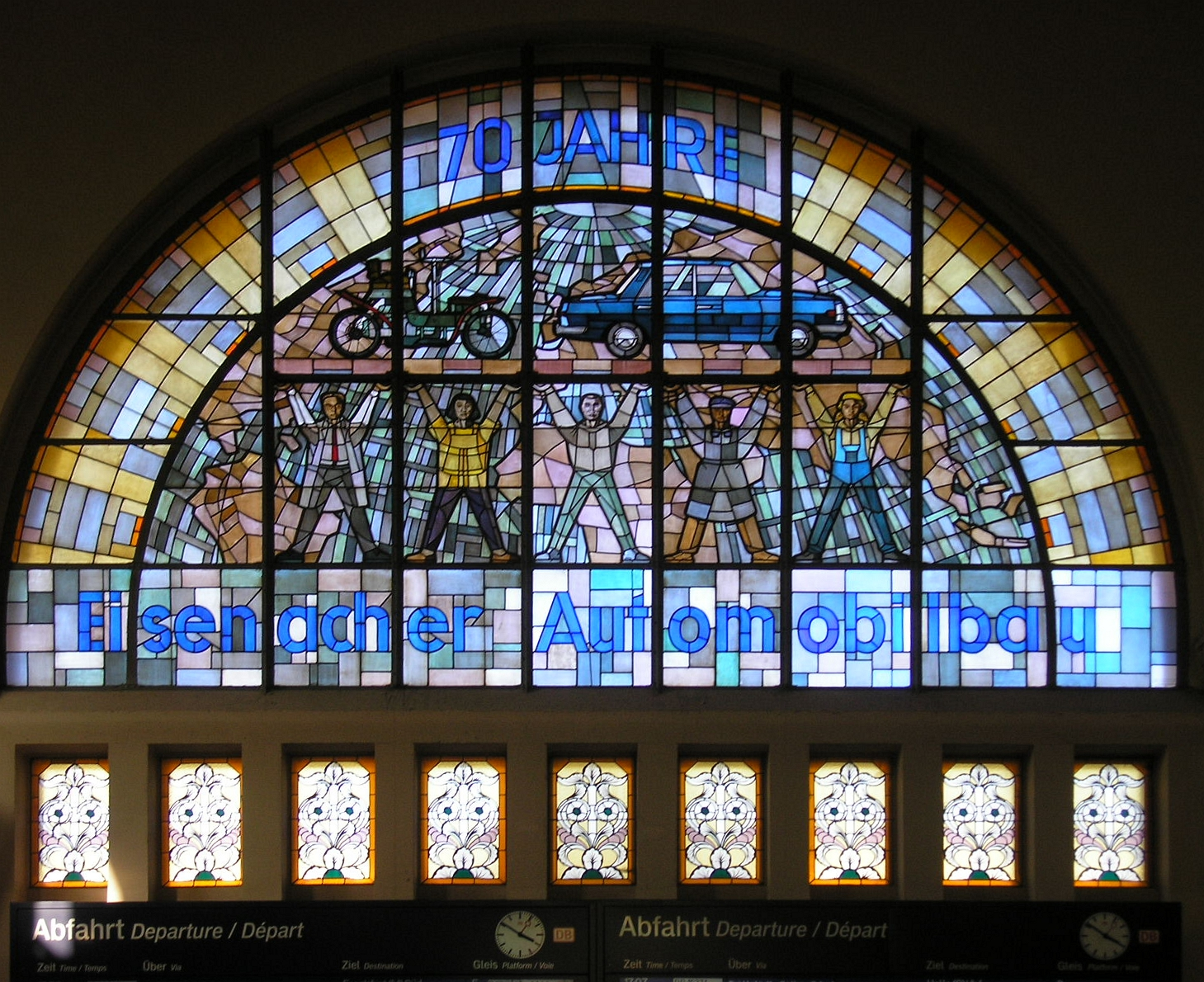
Stained glass representation of the Eisenach car factory in the entrance hall

== Facilities ==
Facilities available at the station are a flower shop, a shop for food and travel supplies as well as a bookshop. In addition, in 2009, a Subway opened in the former waiting room. The station has facilities for the disabled, including a lift to all platforms. Deutsche Bahn has a service point (open 6:00 a.m. to 10:30 p.m.) and a travel centre with tourist information. There is a taxi rank directly outside the station. A car rental agency is nearby.

== History ==
=== 1840-1900 ===
The construction of the Thuringian Railway was agreed to under a treaty signed on 20 December 1841 between the Kingdom of Prussia, the Grand Duchy of Saxe-Weimar-Eisenach and the Duchy of Saxe-Coburg and Gotha. At the same time planning had started on a line from Eisenach to Meiningen. The Erfurt–Eisenach section opened on 24 June 1847. The first Eisenach station was built at ground level in 1846–1847 and opened as an interim terminal station on the Gotha–Fröttstädt–Wutha–Eisenach section on 24 June 1847. The line was continued west two years later on 18 August 1849, with the section to Hörschel, now a suburb of Eisenach opened for excursion traffic. The line was connected to Gerstungen on 25 September 1849, closing the gap with the Hessian Frederick William Northern Railway.

From 1856 Eisenach developed into a railway junction with the opening of the Werra Railway on 2 November 1858. Already the Thuringian railway had been duplicated between Eisenach and Apolda. Eisenach station was expanded between 1859 and 1861 and again in 1885. In 1882 and 1895 the railway companies serving the station were acquired as Prussian state railways. On 1 August 1897, Eisenach tramways began operating from the station forecourt.

=== 1900-1945 ===
In 1900 a major renovation began on the railway facilities: The railway line in the city area was raised by three to four metres and the station building was rebuilt. Also, the goods yard was rebuilt with a hump. On 12 April 1904 the rebuilt station building was opened, along with a post office.

Between 1922 and 1926 this work was followed by the construction of a railway depot in the eastern part of the goods yard along with a roundhouse. By 1928 the reception building was again too small, and an extension was built for the ticket office. Various works were built, including a facility for train supervision and a large yard for general freight. A modern electro-mechanical signal box and new signalling with an Indusi train detection system were installed.

== Routes / lines ==
The station is served by the following long-distance and regional services in the 2019 timetable:

Line	Route	Interval (mins)
ICE 11	Berlin Gesundbrunnen – Berlin – Leipzig – Erfurt – Eisenach – Frankfurt – Mannheim – Stuttgart – Munich	120
ICE 15	Eisenach → Erfurt → Halle → Berlin → Eberswalde → Stralsund → Binz	One train
ICE 50	Dresden – Leipzig – Erfurt – Eisenach – Fulda – Frankfurt (Main) Süd – Frankfurt Airport – Mainz – Wiesbaden	120
IC 51	Düsseldorf/Cologne – Dortmund – Kassel – Eisenach – Erfurt – Weimar – Jena West – Jena-Göschwitz – Gera Hbf	Two train pairs
IC 51	Kassel – Bebra – Eisenach – Erfurt – Weimar – Jena West – Jena-Göschwitz – Gera Hbf	One train pair
IC 51	Leipzig Hbf – Weimar – Eisenach – Erfurt – Gotha – Eisenach – Fulda – Hanau – Frankfurt (Main)	Individual services, relief services (Fri, Sun)
IC 51	Cologne/Düsseldorf – Essen – Bochum – Dortmund – Kassel – Bebra – Eisenach – Erfurt – Weimar – Leipzig	Individual services, relief services (Fri, Sun)
FLX 10	Berlin Hbf – Berlin Südkreuz – Halle (Saale) – Erfurt – Gotha – Eisenach – Fulda – Frankfurt South – Darmstadt – Weinheim – Heidelberg – Stuttgart	1-2 train pairs daily
RB 20	Eisenach – Gotha – Erfurt – Weimar – Apolda – Naumburg (Saale) – Merseburg – Weißenfels – Leipzig	60
RB 6	Eisenach – Eisenach West – Hörschel – Herleshausen – Gerstungen – Wildeck – Ronshausen – Bebra	60 (Mon–Fri) 120 (Sat+Sun)
RB 41	Eisenach – Bad Salzungen – Wernshausen – Meiningen – Grimmenthal – Hildburghausen – Eisfeld (– Sonneberg)	60 (Mon–Fri) 120 (Sat+Sun)

== Tracks ==
The station has six platform tracks, four of which are for long distance operations. Between tracks two and three there is an access track to the freight depot. In addition, the station has extensive trackage for parking regional and long distance trains.

East of the passenger station is the goods yard. Freight trains are reconstituted here to run on the Werra line or to various points in the region or in the opposite direction.

East of the freight station is the Eisenach depot and the former workshop. The facilities were closed by Deutsche Bahn in 2001 and sold. The entire area was bought in 2004 by the Uwe Adam Railway Company Ltd (Uwe Adam Eisenbahnverkehrsunternehmen GmbH) for its headquarters.

== See also ==
- Rail transport in Germany
- Railway stations in Germany
