= Meerane station =

Railway station in Meerane, Germany

Meerane
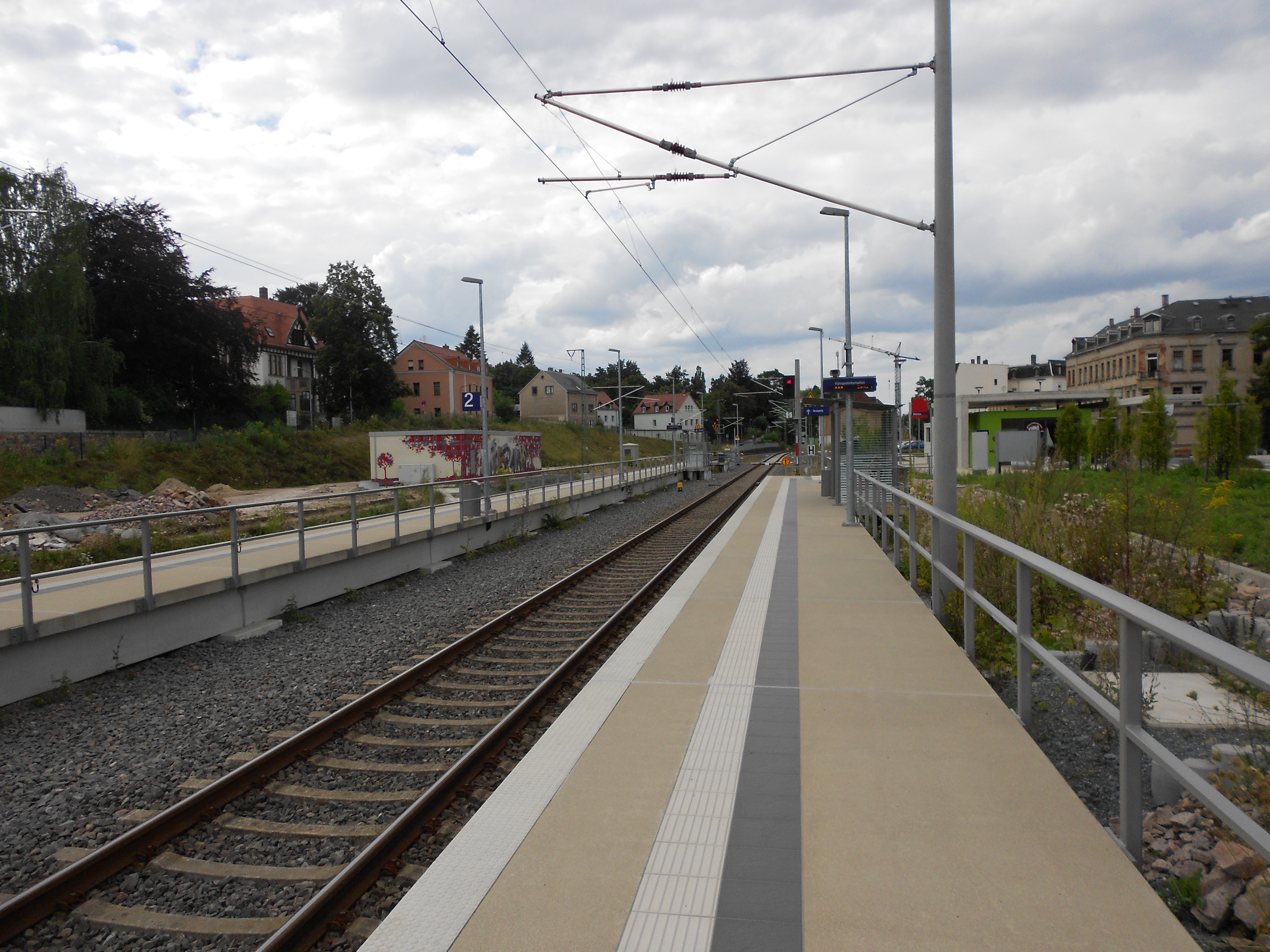
- Meerane station (August 2013)

General information
- Location: Am Bahnhof 5, Meerane, Saxony; Germany
- Coordinates: 50°51′03″N 12°27′27″E
- Owner: Deutsche Bahn
- Operator: DB Station&Service
- Line: Glauchau–Gößnitz (km 6.7)
- Platforms: 2

Construction
- Accessible: Yes

Other information
- Station code: 4022
- DS100 code: DMA
- IBNR: 8012323
- Category: 6
- Fare zone: VMS: 11
- Website: www.bahnhof.de

History
- Opened: 15 November 1858

Services
Preceding station	DB Regio Südost	Following station
Gößnitz towards Göttingen	RE 1	Glauchau (Sachs) Terminus
Preceding station	City-Bahn Chemnitz	Following station
Gößnitz Terminus	RB 37	Glauchau-Schönbörnchen towards Glauchau (Sachs)
Location
- Location within Saxony Location within Germany Location within Europe

Meerane station is a railway station on the Glauchau–Gößnitz railway. Meerane station is the only station in the town of Meerane in the German state of Saxony. The station is now served by Regionalbahn and Regional-Express services on the Mid-Germany Connection (Mitte-Deutschland-Verbindung). Freight transport facilities no longer exist.

== History ==
Meerane station has existed since the opening of the line on 15 November 1858.

The station building was completely rebuilt in 1940/41. The historicised facade decoration was replaced by smooth plaster surfaces.

Deutsche Reichsbahn's electrification program reached Meerane station in May 1984. Only a single track was electrified as an economy.

After German reunification in 1990, Meerane station was also stop for express, D and InterRegio trains for a short time. In the 1993/94 timetable, the long-distance train pairs, D 2058/59 (Chemnitz–Erfurt/Weimar–Chemnitz) and IR 2550/51 (Chemnitz–Aachen and return) stopped in Meerane. There was, however, a sharp drop in freight traffic. After 2000, the equipment for handling freight and the tracks that were no longer needed were closed and the tracks were dismantled.

After the InterRegio connections were discontinued, only Regionalbahn and Regional-Express services operated by DB Regio stopped at Meerane. It was now connected to the west (Erfurt, Jena, Gera), north (Altenburg, Leipzig) and east (Glauchau, Chemnitz, Dresden).

In 2011, Meerane station was fundamentally rebuilt and a modern public transport system was created during the renewal of the Glauchau–Gößnitz railway. The line was completely blockaded for nine months. A "house" platform (next to the station building) and an island platform were built and access to the island platform is protected by a passenger security system. The historic entrance building, which was vacated, was demolished despite intense discussions regarding the preservation of its portico. The entrance building was not a protected monument because of its reconstruction in 1940/41. The through track was built to accommodate 140 km/h and tilting technology during the course of the track upgrade. The control of the signals and points since then have been operated through a local electronic interlocking, which is controlled from the Leipzig operations centre.

Scheduled services recommenced on 11 December 2011.

== Description ==
The historic entrance building was built in the 19th century in a typical, historicist style. Similar station buildings with identical facade elements were built in Saxony, among others in Freiberg, Hohenstein-Ernstthal and Zittau. After a reconstruction carried out in 1940/41, the character of the building changed completely. It was adapted to the architecture of the time. All the historical facade elements were removed. The entrance area was overlaid with a so-called portico, which was later decorated with a wall painting (two workers, a weaver and a mechanical engineer). This was characteristic of the station in the 1970s and shaped its appearance for travellers. Typical of the Nazi period was a large heraldic eagle on the front sides of the building, which was removed in 1945. Its former location could easily be seen from the colour and form of the much darker plaster until the building was demolished in 2010.

The historic entrance building was demolished in 2011 to allow barrier-free access and replaced by a simple functional building with a ticket machine, store for travel necessities, toilets and bicycle parking. Two stops were set up for regional bus services. There are many parking spaces for cars.

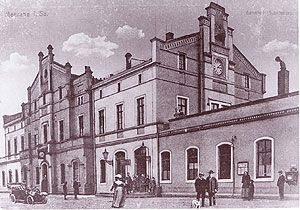
Meerane station (1858)

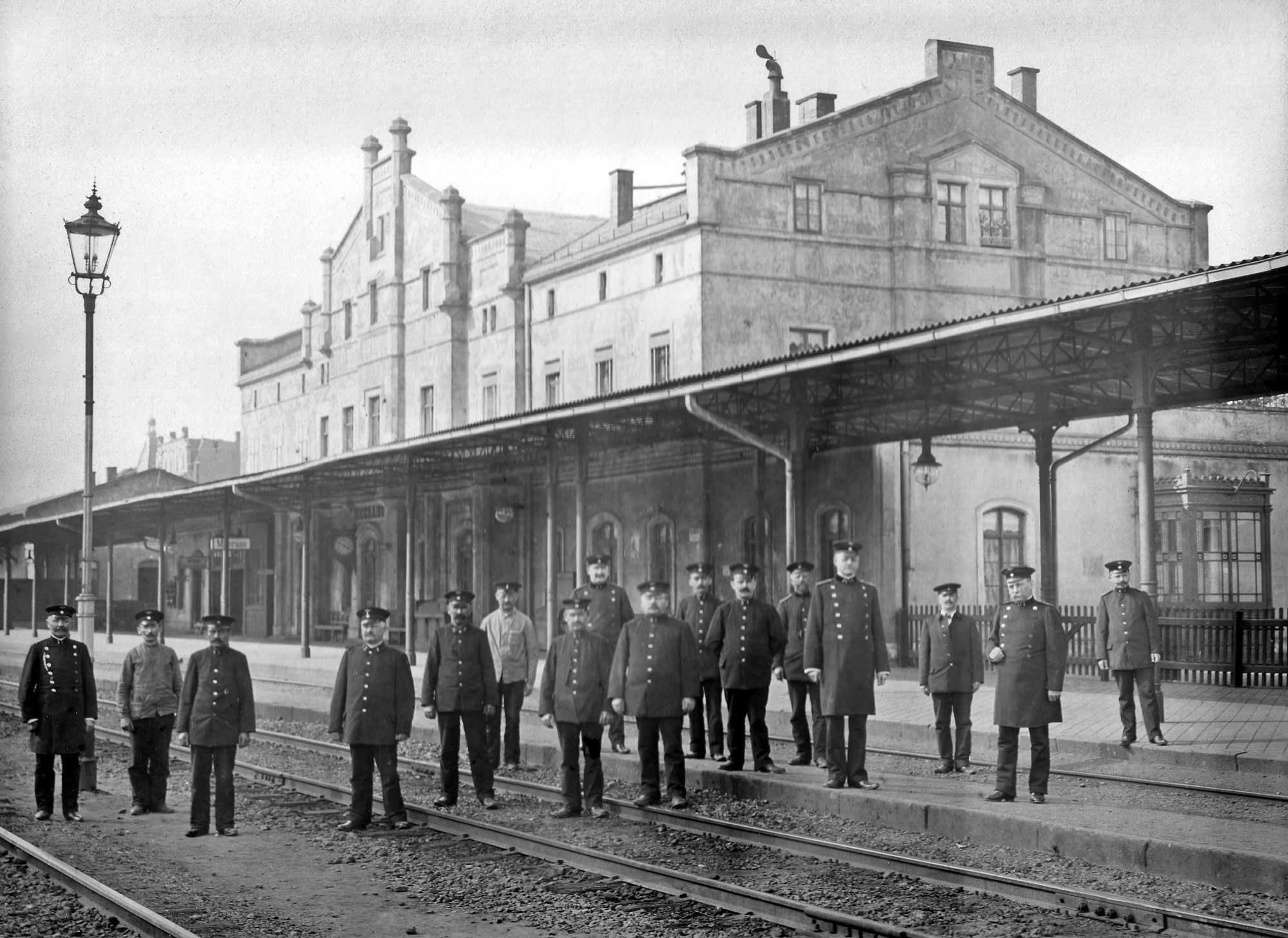
Meerane station (1908)

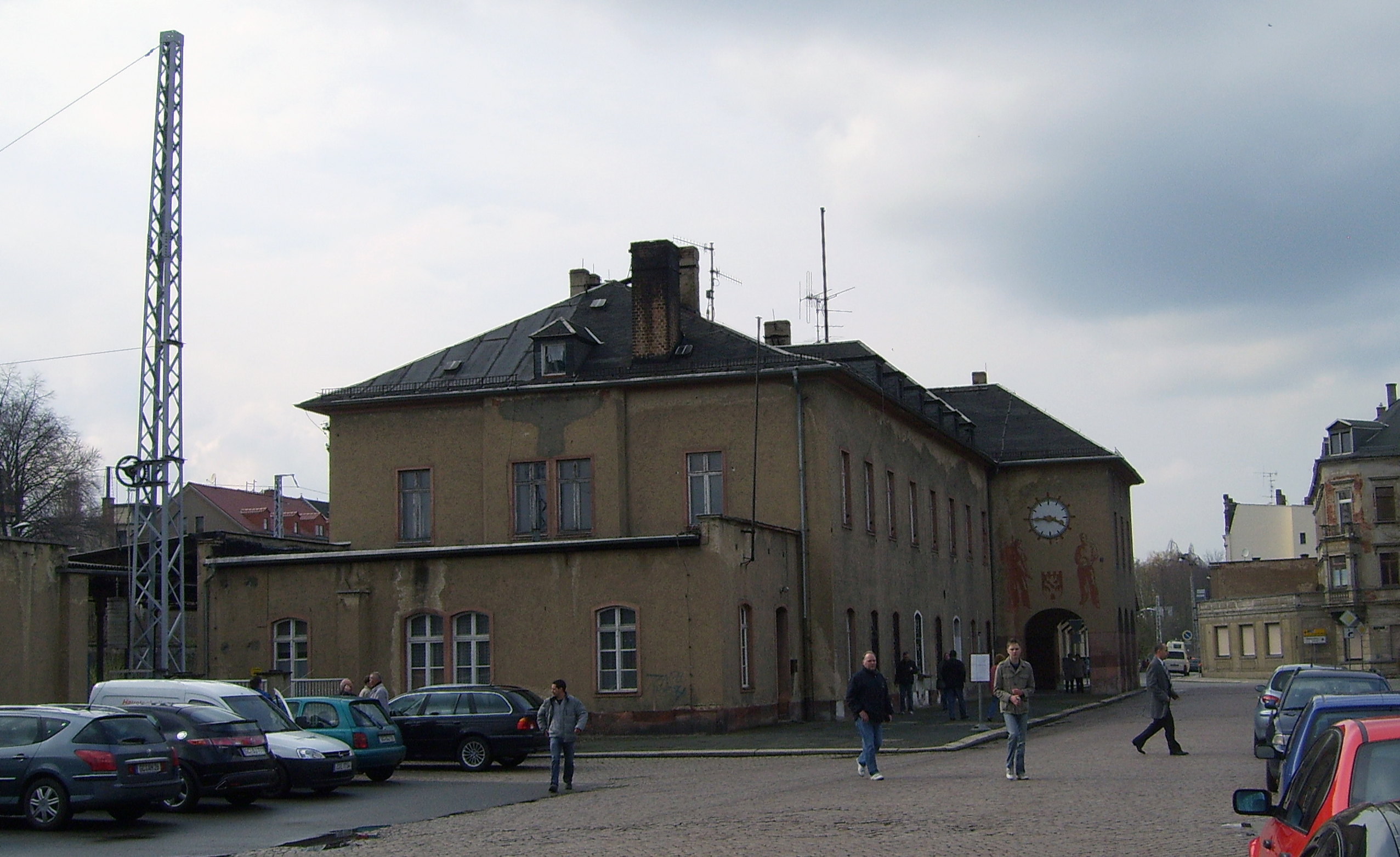
Meerane station (2008)

After reconstruction in 2011, Meerane station has two platforms, each with a length of 170 m.

== Transport connections ==
=== Regional services ===
In the 2016 timetable, Meerane station is served by a regional express line (RE 1), running from Göttingen through Erfurt Hbf, Gera Hbf and Meerane to Glauchau (Sachs), and a short regional service (RB 37) running from Gößnitz to Glauchau. Both lines run every two hours, so there is one scheduled departure per hour and direction.

=== Bus services ===
Several bus routes, which are integrated into the Verkehrsverbund Mitachsen stop in the station forecourt. In addition to routes within Meerane, the following bus routes run:

- route 133 to Zwickau
- route 105 to Glauchau
- routes 106 and 119 to Crimmitschau
- route 133 to Gößnitz
