= Glauchau (Sachs) station =

Railway station in Glauchau, Germany

Glauchau (Sachs)
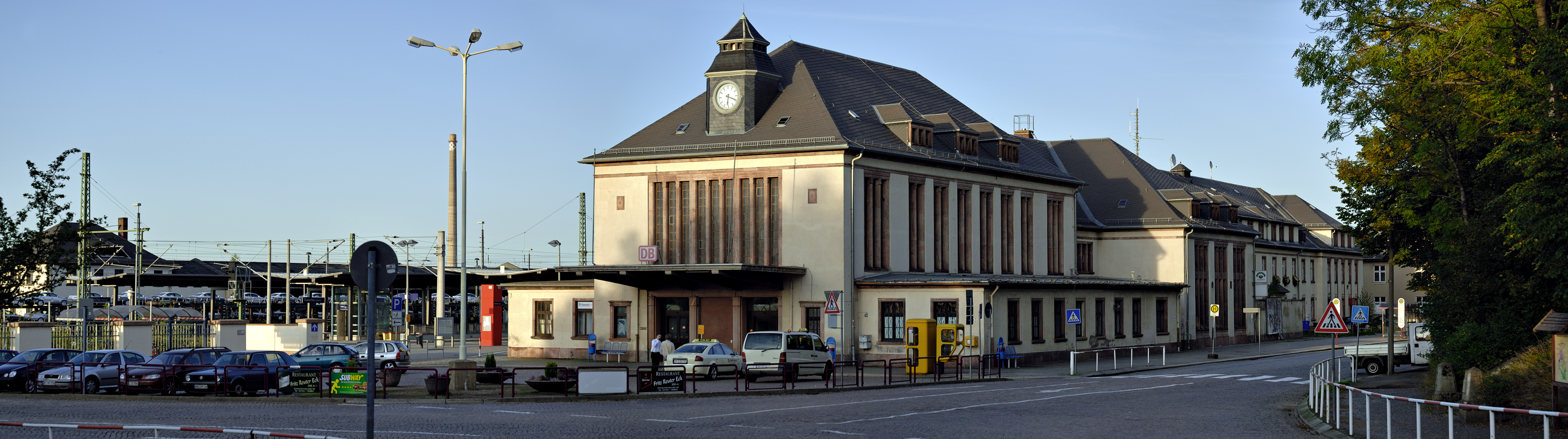
- The entrance building of Glauchau station

General information
- Location: Rosa-Luxemburg-Str. 3, Glauchau, Saxony; Germany
- Coordinates: 50°49′44″N 12°32′56″E
- Owner: Deutsche Bahn
- Operator: DB Station&Service
- Lines: Dresden–Werdau railway (km 112.14); former Glauchau–Wurzen railway (km 0.00)
- Platforms: 5

Construction
- Accessible: Yes (except platforms 4/5)

Other information
- Station code: 2142
- DS100 code: DGL
- IBNR: 8010129
- Category: 3
- Fare zone: VMS: 58
- Website: www.bahnhof.de

History
- Opened: 1858
- Electrified: 1963

Services
Preceding station	DB Regio Südost	Following station
Meerane towards Göttingen	RE 1	Terminus
Preceding station	Mitteldeutsche Regiobahn	Following station
Zwickau Hbf towards Hof Hbf	RE 3	Hohenstein-Ernstthal towards Dresden Hbf
Glauchau-Schönbörnchen towards Zwickau Hbf	RB 30	Sankt Egidien towards Dresden Hbf
Preceding station	City-Bahn Chemnitz	Following station
Glauchau-Schönbörnchen towards Gößnitz	RB 37	Terminus
Terminus	RB 92	Sankt Egidien towards Stollberg (Sachs)
Location
- Location within Saxony Location within Germany Location within Europe

Glauchau station is the main railway station in Glauchau, located in the southwestern part of the German state of Saxony. It lies on the Dresden–Werdau line and serves as a key transportation hub for the region. The city also has another station, Glauchau-Schönbörnchen.

== History ==
On 15 November 1858, the Chemnitz–Zwickau section of the Dresden–Werdau line was inaugurated, including the opening of Glauchau Station. Constructed with the support of the Saxon government, the railway later became part of the Royal Saxon State Railways. The original station featured seven tracks, each 680 meters long, with a total of 35 sets of points. With the opening of the Glauchau–Wurzen railway to Wurzen on 10 May 1875, the station was slightly expanded to accommodate the additional traffic.

By 1908, plans were underway to expand the station further, as it was struggling to meet growing traffic demands. Construction began in 1913 but was interrupted by First World War and did not resume until 1923. The expansion included new freight facilities, four signal boxes, a maintenance depot, and two bridges over the Lungwitzbach stream. Tracks and platforms were also modified and extended. On 30 April 1926, the newly expanded Glauchau Station officially opened.

During the Second World War the station was bombed several times. On 11 April 1945, a particularly devastating attack resulted in the deaths of 55 people, including 54 Wehrmacht soldiers, who perished inside a railway carriage.

During the 2002 European floods the Glauchau–Wurzen railway was damaged. As a result, the last passenger train ran on the line on 13 August 2002. Freight traffic had already been terminated on 1 July 2000.

== Regional services ==
Glauchau was served by the following services in 2025:

Line	Route	Frequency (min)
RE 1	Glauchau – Gößnitz – Gera – Jena-Göschwitz – Weimar – Erfurt – Gotha – Leinefelde – Göttingen	120
RE 3	Dresden – Freiberg (Sachs) – Chemnitz – Glauchau – Zwickau (Sachs) – Plauen (Vogtl) – Hof	60
RB 30	Dresden – Freiberg (Sachs) – Chemnitz – Glauchau – Zwickau (Sachs)	60 (peak: 30 Chemnitz–Zwickau)
RB 37	Glauchau – Glauchau-Schönbörnchen – Meerane – Gößnitz	120
RB 92	Glauchau – St. Egidien – Lichtenstein (Sachs) – Oelsnitz (Erzgeb) – Stollberg (Sachs)	60 (Mon–Fri)
