= Trams in Chemnitz =

Tram network in Saxony, Germany

Coordinates: 50°49′55″N 12°55′20″E

Chemnitz tramway network
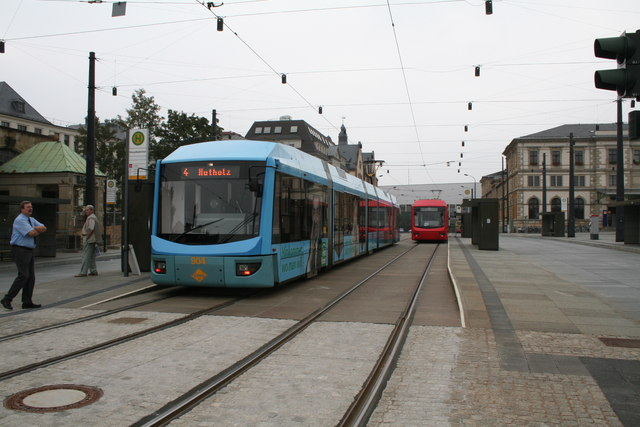
- Tram Vario Car at Chemnitz Hbf, 2007.

Operation
- Locale: Chemnitz, Saxony, Germany

Statistics
Horsecar era: 1880–1898
- Status: Converted to electricity
- Track gauge: 914 mm (3 ft)
Electric tram era: since 1893
- Status: Operational
- Operators: Chemnitzer Verkehrs-Aktiengesellschaft (CVAG) (since 1990); City-Bahn Chemnitz (CBC)
- Track gauge: 914 mm (3 ft) Ra; (1893–ca 1914); 925 mm (3 ft 13/32 in); (ca 1914–1950s/1988); 1,435 mm (4 ft 8 1/2 in) standard gauge; (since the 1950s)
- Propulsion system: Electricity
- Electrification: 600 V DC overhead
- Track length (total): 39.97 km (24.84 mi)
- Route length: 30.6 km (19.0 mi)
- Map of the network, 10 December 2017.
- Website: CVAG (in German, English, and French)

The Chemnitz tramway network (German: Straßenbahnnetz Chemnitz) is a network of tramways forming the centrepiece of the public transport system in Chemnitz, a city in the federal state of Saxony, Germany.

Opened in 1880 as a horsecar system, the network was converted to an electrically powered system between 1893 and 1898. The network's gauge, originally 914 mm (3 ft), was widened to 925 mm (3 ft 13/32 in) by the outbreak of World War I. From the 1950s, the gauge was widened further, to 1,435 mm (4 ft 8 1/2 in) standard gauge, although the gauge conversion work was not completed until as late as 1988. The infrastructure is currently operated by the Chemnitzer Verkehrs-Aktiengesellschaft (CVAG), and services are operated by them and City-Bahn Chemnitz. The system is integrated in the Verkehrsverbund Mittelsachsen (VMS).

The city used Czechoslovak Tatra T3 trams (Tatra T3D and Tatra B3D) from 1969 until they were all decommissioned by 2019. Some were sold to Kazakhstan and Russia. In 1993, the city began using Stadler Variobahn, originally built by ABB (ASEA Brown Boveri, now made by Stadler). In 2019, new Škoda 35 T trams were delivered to the city.

== Lines ==
As of 10 December 2017, the network consists of 9 lines, as follows:

Line	Route	Stations	Operator	Notes
1	Schönau ↔ Brückenstraße	11	CVAG	continues from Brückenstraße as line 2 to Bernsdorf
2	Bernsdorf ↔ Brückenstraße	10	CVAG	continues from Brückenstraße as line 1 to Schönau
3	Hauptbahnhof ↔ Technopark	12	CVAG	
4	Hutholz ↔ Hauptbahnhof (via Stollberger Straße)	21	CVAG	
5	Gablenz ↔ Hutholz (via Annaberger Straße)	27	CVAG	
C11	(Stollberg ↔) Altchemnitz ↔ Hauptbahnhof	17 (+11)	CBC	South of Altchemnitz this line operates as a railway using Zwönitz–Chemnitz Süd railway line
C13	(Burgstädt ↔) Hauptbahnhof ↔ Technopark (↔ Aue)	11 (+26)	CBC	East of Chemnitz Hauptbahnhof this line operates as a railway using Neukieritzsch–Chemnitz railway. South of Technopark this line operates as a railway using Chemnitz-Adorf railway
C14	(Mittweida ↔) Hauptbahnhof ↔ Technopark (↔ Thalheim)	11 (+19)	CBC	East of Chemnitz Hauptbahnhof this line operates as a railway using Riesa–Chemnitz railway. South of Technopark this line operates as a railway using Chemnitz-Adorf railway
C15	(Hainichen ↔) Hauptbahnhof ↔ Technopark	11 (+7)	CBC	East of Chemnitz Hauptbahnhof this line operates as a railway using Dresden–Werdau railway and Roßwein–Niederwiesa railway

== See also ==
- List of town tramway systems in Germany
- Trams in Germany
