= Sankt Egidien station =

Railway station in Sankt Egidien, Germany

St Egidien
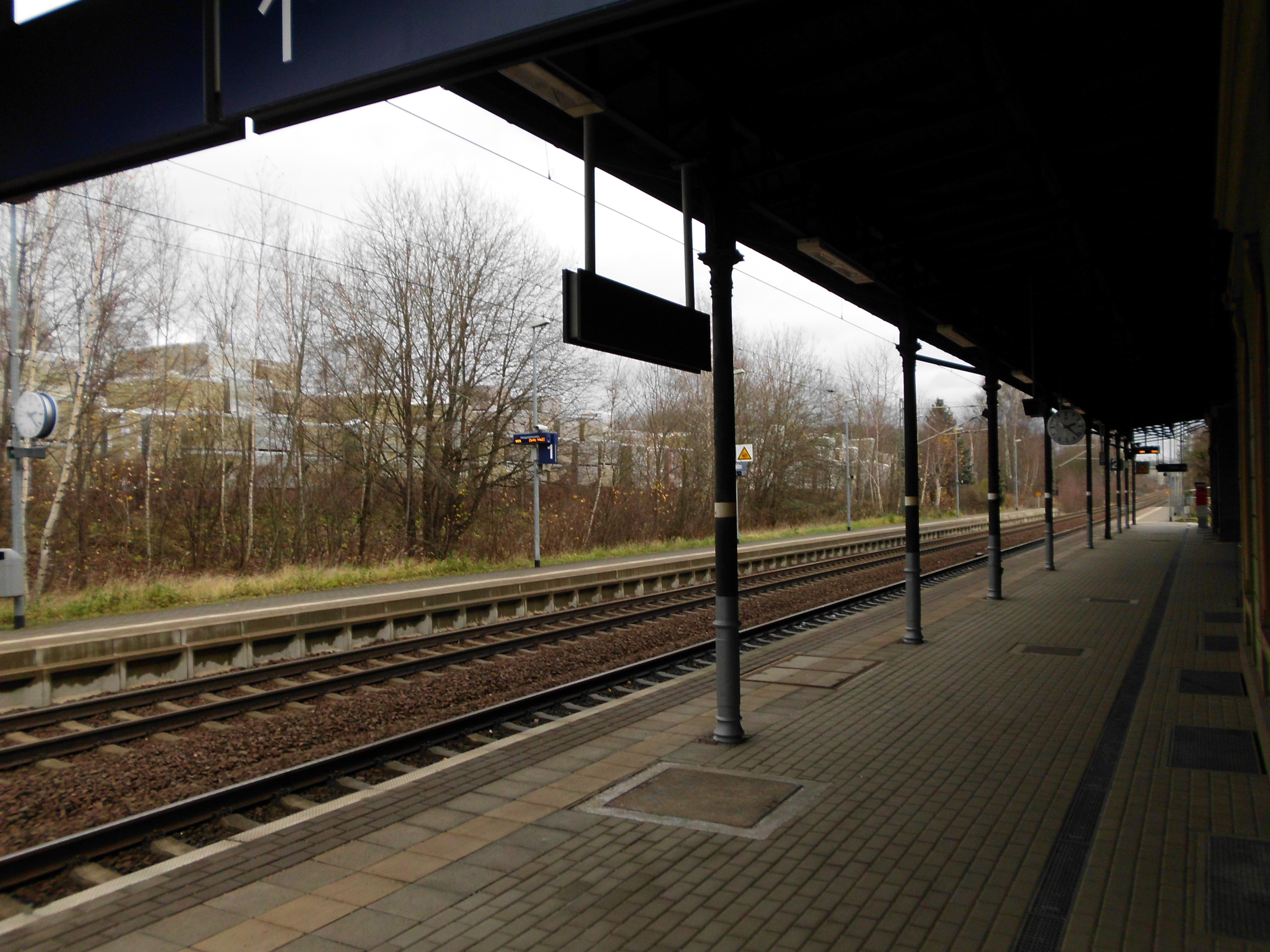
- Station in December 2011

General information
- Location: Bahnhofstr. 23, Sankt Egidien, Saxony; Germany
- Coordinates: 50°47′22″N 12°37′21″E
- Line: Dresden–Werdau railway
- Platforms: 3

Other information
- Station code: 5936
- DS100 code: DEG
- IBNR: 8010331
- Category: 5
- Website: www.bahnhof.de

History
- Opened: 15 November 1858
Location
- Location within Saxony Location within Germany Location within Europe

The Sankt Egidien station is the railway station of the Municipality of Sankt Egidien, Saxony, Germany.

== Regional services ==
Preceding station	Mitteldeutsche Regiobahn	Following station
Glauchau (Sachs) towards Zwickau Hbf	RB 30	Hohenstein-Ernstthal towards Dresden Hbf
Preceding station	City-Bahn Chemnitz	Following station
Glauchau (Sachs) Terminus	RB 92	Lichtenstein Gewerbegebiet towards Stollberg (Sachs)
