= Gößnitz station =

Railway station in Gößnitz, Germany

Gößnitz
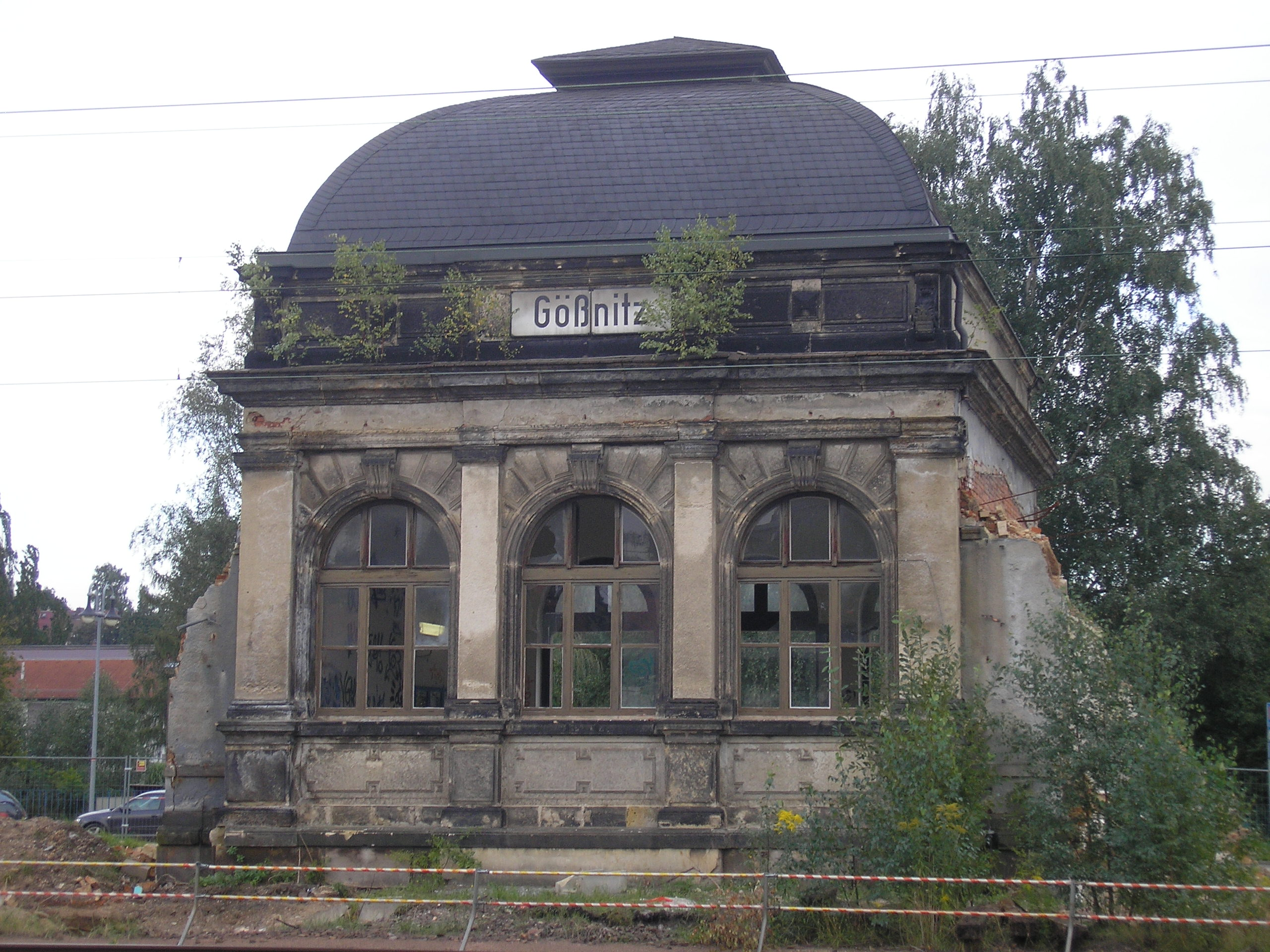
- Entrance building (2010)

General information
- Location: Bahnhofstr. 1a-b, Gößnitz, Thuringia; Germany
- Coordinates: 50°53′34″N 12°25′47″E
- Owner: Deutsche Bahn
- Operator: DB Station&Service
- Lines: Leipzig–Hof (km 53.624); Glauchau–Gößnitz (km 12.373); Gößnitz–Gera (km -0.374)
- Platforms: 4

Construction
- Accessible: Platform 4 only

Other information
- Station code: 2207
- DS100 code: DGZ
- IBNR: 8010134
- Category: 4
- Fare zone: MDV: 323 and 324
- Website: www.bahnhof.de

History
- Opened: 15 March 1844

Services
Preceding station	DB Regio Südost	Following station
Schmölln (Thür) towards Göttingen	RE 1	Meerane towards Glauchau (Sachs)
Preceding station	City-Bahn Chemnitz	Following station
Terminus	RB 37	Meerane towards Glauchau (Sachs)
Preceding station	Mitteldeutschland S-Bahn	Following station
Lehndorf towards Halle (Saale) Hbf	S 5	Ponitz towards Zwickau Hbf
Altenburg towards Halle (Saale) Hbf	S 5x	Crimmitschau towards Zwickau Hbf
Location
- Location within Thuringia Location within Germany Location within Europe

Gößnitz station is a railway station on the Leipzig–Hof railway, the Glauchau–Gößnitz railway and the Gößnitz–Gera (Mid-Germany Railway) in Gößnitz in the German state of Thuringia.

The station was opened on 15 March 1844 with the Altenburg–Crimmitschau section by the Saxon-Bavarian Railway Company (Sächsisch-Baiersche Eisenbahn-Compagnie).

== History ==
On 1 July 1841, work began on the construction of the Leipzig–Hof railway, the first section of which opened to Altenburg on 19 September 1842. The section to Gößnitz and Crimmitschau was opened to on 15 March 1844 and the rest of the line was opened on 15 July 1851. The first Gößnitz station building was a wooden building, which was replaced by a new building with the opening of the Glauchau–Gößnitz railway on 15 November 1858. The Gößnitz–Gera railway was opened on 28 December 1865. The construction of the third station building took place in 1893.

In Gößnitz there was a water tower with high tanks and water cranes for steam locomotives. These facilities were no longer needed after the railway line from Leipzig to Reichenbach was electrified in 1962/63.

The demolition of the water tower, the freight shed as well as the north wing of the stately heritage-listed station building in Neo-Baroque style began in 2007. Three years later demolition of the rest of the building followed. Since then, the town has been trying to find a solution because the site belongs to Deutsche Bahn and it does not see any need for further action after the demolition.

In 2013, a bus loop and some parking lots were erected in front of the railway station. Gößnitz has been integrated in the network of the S-Bahn Mitteldeutschland since 15 December 2013.

== Platforms ==
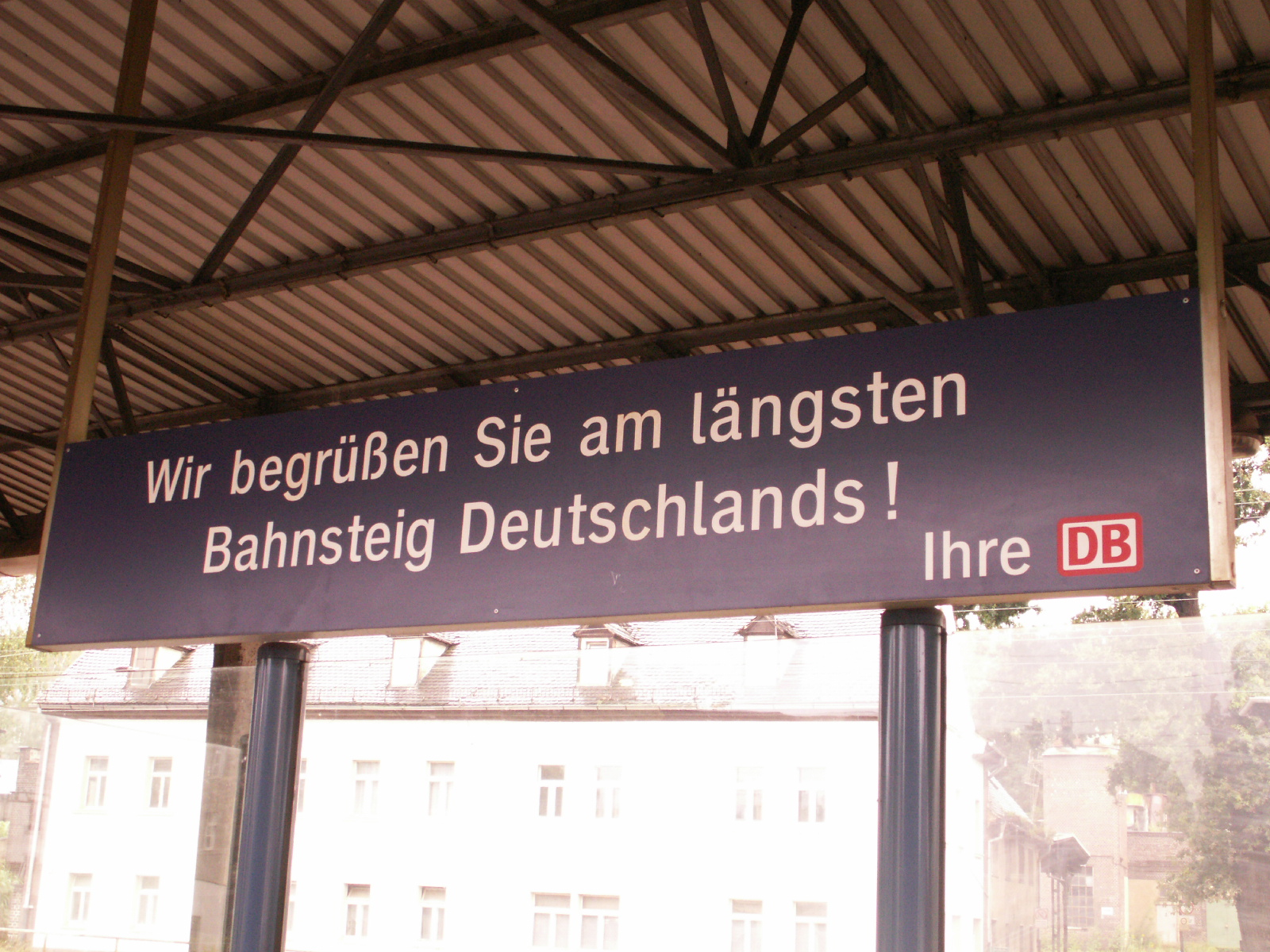
Platforms in Gößnitz

Gößnitz station was built with an extra long platform to allow several trains to be run from the platform in different directions simultaneously.

A sign at the station indicates that the station has the longest platform in Germany at 608 metres. It is also listed in the station register of DB Station&Service as having a construction length of 608 metres. The useful length of the platform is shown as only 435 metres.

Gößnitz does not actually have the longest platform in Germany. In the stations of Mainz (706.5 metres), Essen (667 metres), Hamburg (627 metres) and Zittau (347 + 287 metres) there are platforms with a larger structural length than that in Gößnitz.

== Passenger services ==
=== History ===
Until the 2000/2001 timetable, Gößnitz was a stop for long-distance passenger traffic. The last long-distance services in Gößnitz were the Interregio 2792 (Munich Hbf–Leipzig Hbf) and the D-Zug 2793 (Leipzig–Munich). Gößnitz station is also an important hub for east Thuringian and west Saxon passenger services. Portions of regional trains were attached and detached in Gößnitz between December 2002 and June 2014. A portion of Regional-Express service 1, coming from Erfurt, continued via Werdau to Zwickau, while the other portion operated via Meerane to Glauchau. From December 2011, the train continued from Glauchau to Chemnitz and connected the two Saxon centres with the long-distance service node of Erfurt. The service to Zwickau was abandoned as part of the restructuring of regional services with the opening of the City Tunnel.

=== Current ===
Status: summer 2016 timetable

In the 2015/2016 timetable, the station is serviced by lines S5 and S5X of the S-Bahn Mitteldeutschland, which was put into operation in December 2013 with the opening of the City Tunnel Leipzig. The line S5 service has been running every hour since December 2015 from Halle via Leipzig/Halle Airport, Leipzig Hbf to Altenburg, and from here continuing via Gößnitz and Werdau to Zwickau. The S5 is supplemented by an hourly express service on line S5X, which starts at Leipzig/Halle Airport but does not serve all stations. Since December 2013 the S5X replaces the former Regional-Express services RE 8 (Leipzig–Zwickau) and RE 16 (Leipzig–Hof/Bad Brambach) and Regionalbahn, S5 replaces the previous regional service RB 130 (Leipzig–Altenburg–Gößnitz–Zwickau/Glauchau) since then.

The second important connection runs from Thuringia. A service using tilting diesel-multiple units of class 612 runs from Göttingen via Erfurt, Jena-Göschwitz, Gera and Gößnitz, continuing via Meerane to Glauchau. To and from Meerane, the Regional-Express running every two hours is supplemented by the RB 37 service, operated by Erzgebirgsbahn, which connects Gößnitz and Glauchau and the two services together produces an approximately hourly service.
