= Stadler Variobahn =

Tram / light rail vehicle by Stadler Rail

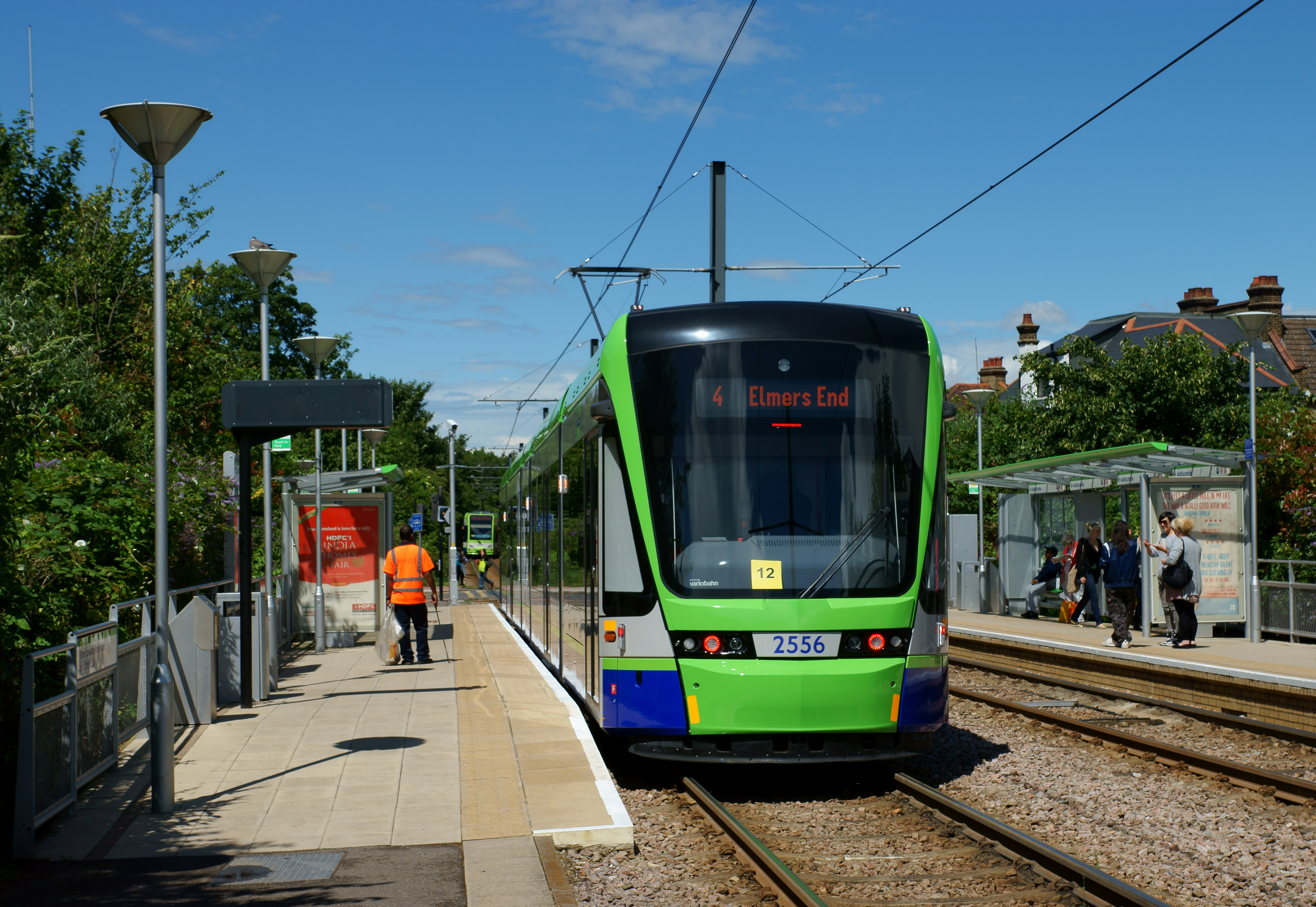
Variobahn tram

The Stadler Variobahn (formerly sold as the ABB Variotram, Adtranz Variotram and Bombardier Variotram) is a model of articulated low-floor tram and light rail vehicle. Since its introduction in 1993, the Variobahn has been manufactured variously by ABB, Adtranz, Bombardier Transportation, and since 2001 by Stadler Pankow. As of 2009, 254 trams have been ordered, with an additional 110 on option. A unit costs about €2.5 million.

Operators include Aarhus Letbane, Odense Letbane the Graz Holding, the Bergen Light Rail, the Chemnitz Tramway, Verkehrsverbund Rhein-Ruhr, the Rhine Neckar Area Tramway and London Tramlink.

== History ==
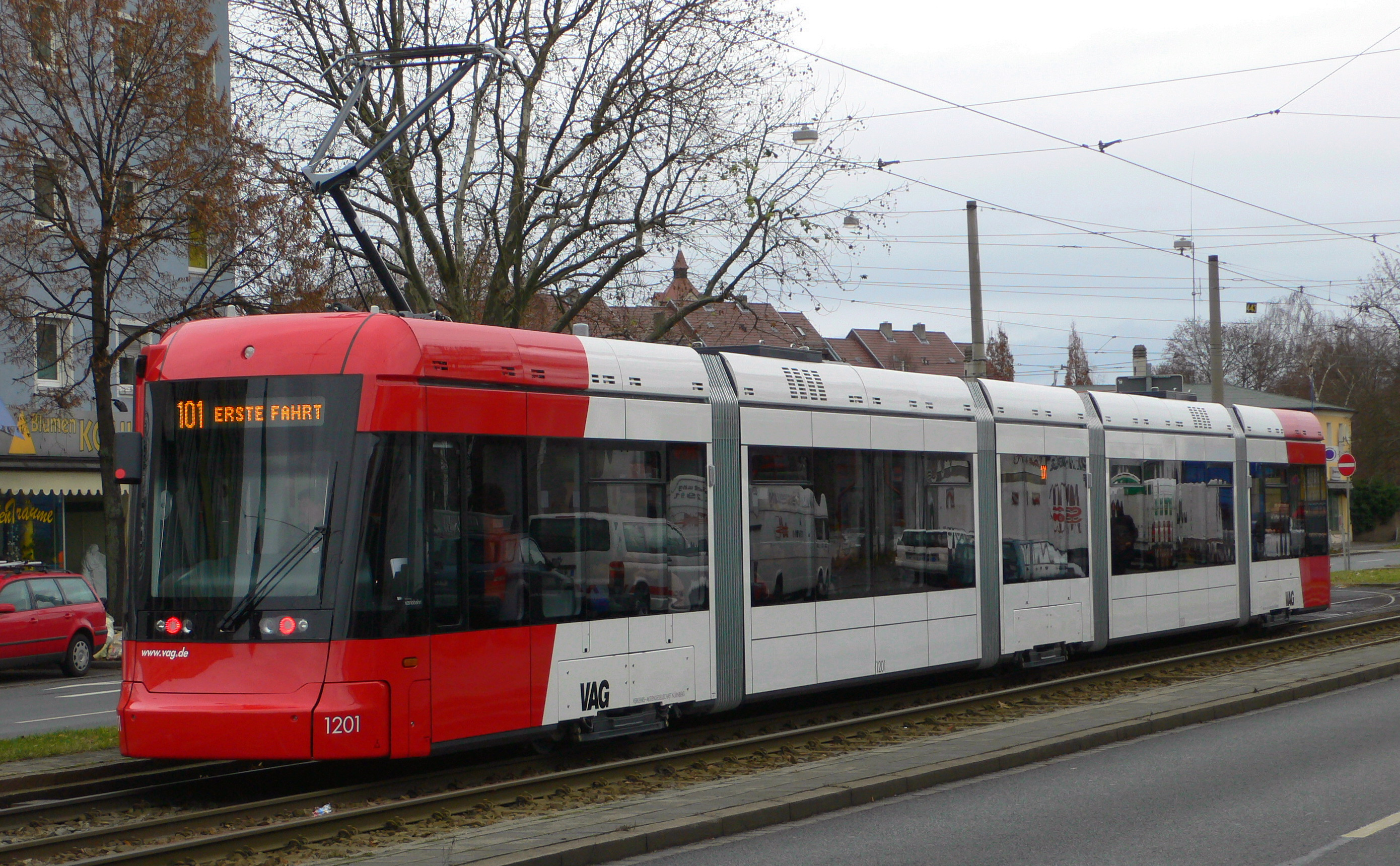
Variotram in Nuremberg, Germany

=== Prototypes and early deliveries ===
The Variotram was first developed by ABB (ASEA Brown Boveri) at Henschel and a prototype was launched in 1993 for the Chemnitz tramway in Germany, operated by Chemnitzer Verkehrs-Aktiengesellschaft (CVAG). The serial delivery, with minor modifications, was made between 1998 and 2001—bringing the total number of units for Chemnitz to thirty. Of these, twenty-four were operated by CVAG and six by City-Bahn Chemnitz. In 1995, ABB's train division merged to become Adtranz. One prototype the following year sold to the Duisburg Stadtbahn, but serial production was never initiated for Duisburg. The Duisburg prototype is now privately owned and stored in Norway.

In 1996, six trams were delivered to serve on the light rail between Mannheim, Heidelberg and Weinheim, Germany, operated by Oberrheinischen Eisenbahn-Gesellschaft. From 2001 to 2007, it ordered additional 20 trams. These were supplemented in 2002 by eight trams for the Heidelberg Tramway, and in 2001–07 by 16 trams for the Mannheim Tramway. In 1996, the Sydney light rail system, in Australia, took delivery of seven trams, which were built in Adtranz's factory in Dandenong, Melbourne, Australia. All were withdrawn by mid-2015 and the remaining six put up for sale. Five were scrapped in early 2018, and the last built, number 2107 was transferred to the Sydney Tramway Museum in October 2018 for preservation.

=== Helsinki ===
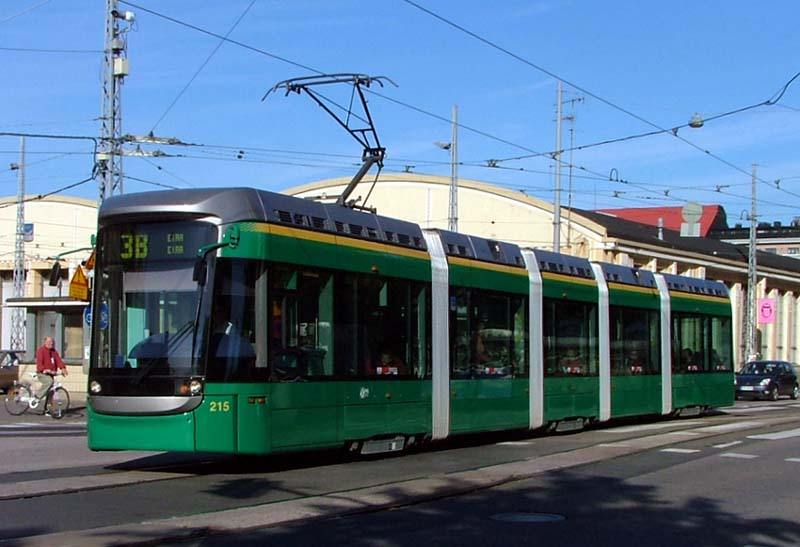
Variotram in Helsinki, Finland

Forty Variotrams were delivered to Helsinki City Transport (HKL), Finland, between 1998 and 2003 for use on the Helsinki tramway, at a cost of €76 million. These trams were built by Transtech in Otanmäki under a technology transfer agreement with Adtranz. During this time the company was acquired by Bombardier, who inherited the design in 2000, making the Helsinki trams the only Variotrams to be produced under the Bombardier name.

In service, the Variotrams were found to be ill-suited for Helsinki's tram network, having suffered from numerous technical problems, including cracks in the bogies and vehicle body shells. Before 2009 often less than half of the trams were operational. HKL considered returning the trams to Bombardier as unsatisfactory, but after a long series of negotiations a compromise was reached in May 2007, when the responsibility for maintaining the trams was transferred to Bombardier.

The contract agreed in May 2007 stated that, from May 2008 onwards, if more than four Variotrams in Helsinki were not in operational condition, Bombardier would pay a daily fine to the HKL for every non-operational tram. If more than eight trams were in non-operational condition, HKL had the right to cancel the contract and return the trams to Bombardier, who were obliged to return the €76 million that HKL paid for the trams. In order to cope with the requirements of the agreement, Bombardier established its own maintenance workshop in Helsinki in mid-2008, located in the premises of the former VR Group electric locomotive workshop in Pasilan Konepaja.

In August 2017 a contract was agreed after long negotiations between HKL and Bombardier to cancel the purchase of the Variotrams with Bombardier paying HKL €33 million in compensation for the shorter than originally contractually agreed 40 year lifetime of the trams. HKL will return the trams to Bombardier from 2018 on. By 2024, 38 of the 40 trams had been scrapped with two (202 and 205) still extant at Alstom's Bautzen factory having been test on the Łódź network in Poland in 2021.

=== Stadler ===
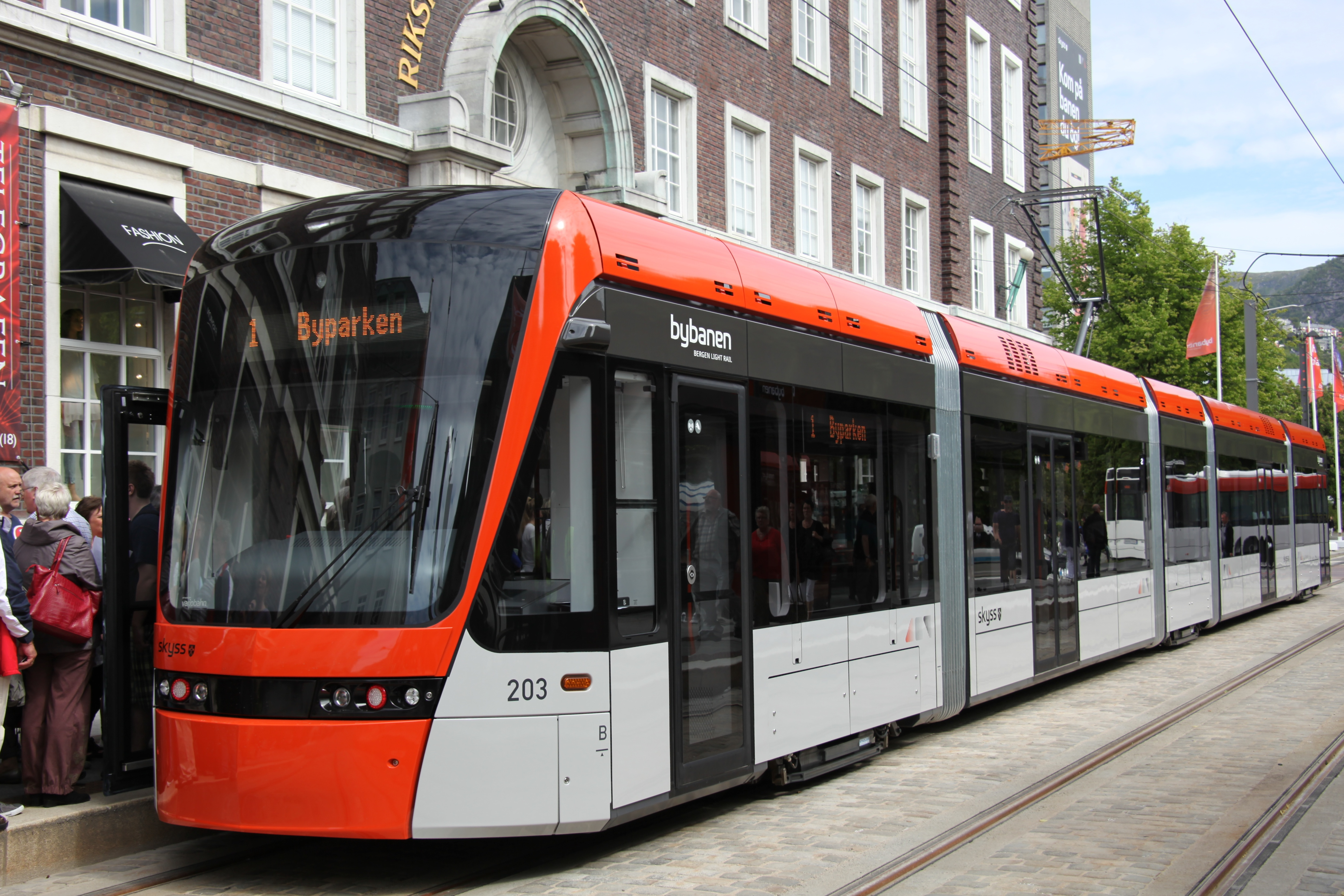
Stadler built Variobahn for the Bergen Light Rail, Norway

To concentrate on its own Flexity family of vehicles, Bombardier reached an agreement with the European Commission where Bombardier would divest the Variotram division to Stadler Rail of Switzerland.

Stadler subsequently renamed the tram as Variobahn and has since secured several contracts, delivering:

- 8 trams for use on the Ludwigshafen tramway
- 30 trams for the Bochum–Gelsenkirchen tramway
- 8 trams for the Nuremberg tramway
- 14 trams for the Munich tramway
- 34 trams for the Bergen Light Rail
- 45 trams for the Graz tramway
- 19 trams for the Potsdam tramway
- 12 trams for Tramlink in London
- 14 trams for Aarhus Letbane
- 16 trams for Odense Letbane

As of 2009, a total of 254 Variobahn trams have been ordered, with an additional 110 on option. A unit costs about €2.5 million. Stadler builds its trams at their Pankow plant in the northern suburbs of Berlin and the Stadler facility at Velten north of Berlin.

==== Problems in Munich ====
In December 2014, MVG took seven of its Variobahns out of service due to cracks in vehicle bodies. By January 2015, all Variobahns had to be withdrawn for repairs. MVG chose not to exercise options to buy any more Variobahns, and turned to Siemens to supply its next generation of trams.

==== Variobahn trams for Croydon Tramlink ====
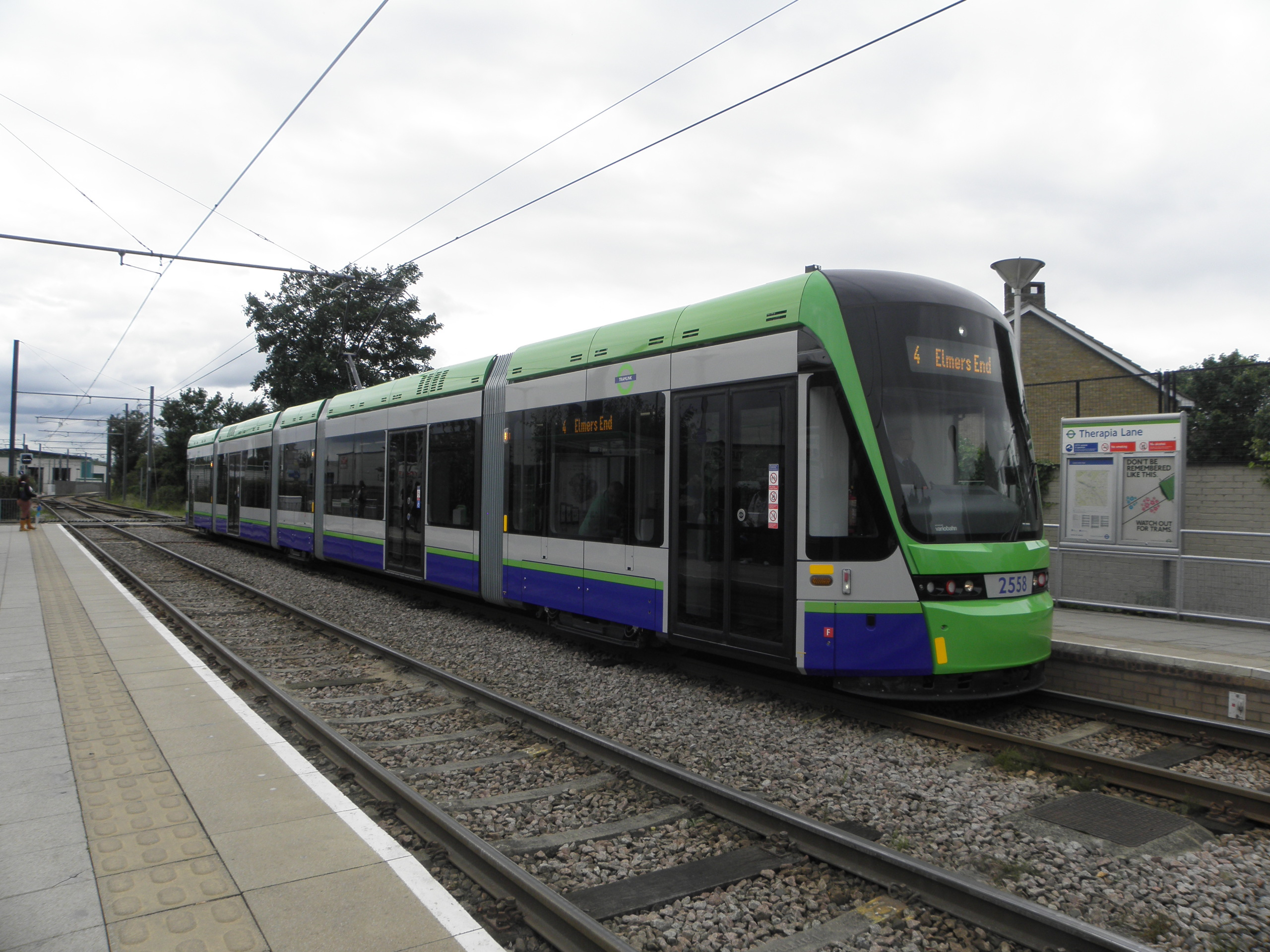
Variobahn in London, United Kingdom

Six units were ordered for Tramlink by Transport for London in August 2011 at a cost of £16.3 million with an option for up to eight more.

Three of the Croydon trams were diverted from a batch of five which were ordered for the Bybanen line in Bergen, Norway. Stadler built these earlier than the contractual delivery date to make use of free capacity at its factory. Three more trams were built directly for Croydon, plus three trams for Bergen to replace the ones which went to Croydon.

Initial testing was carried out in Chemnitz, Saxony. The first tram, 2554, was delivered to Croydon on 24 January 2012 and carried its first passengers on 30 March 2012.

== Specifications ==
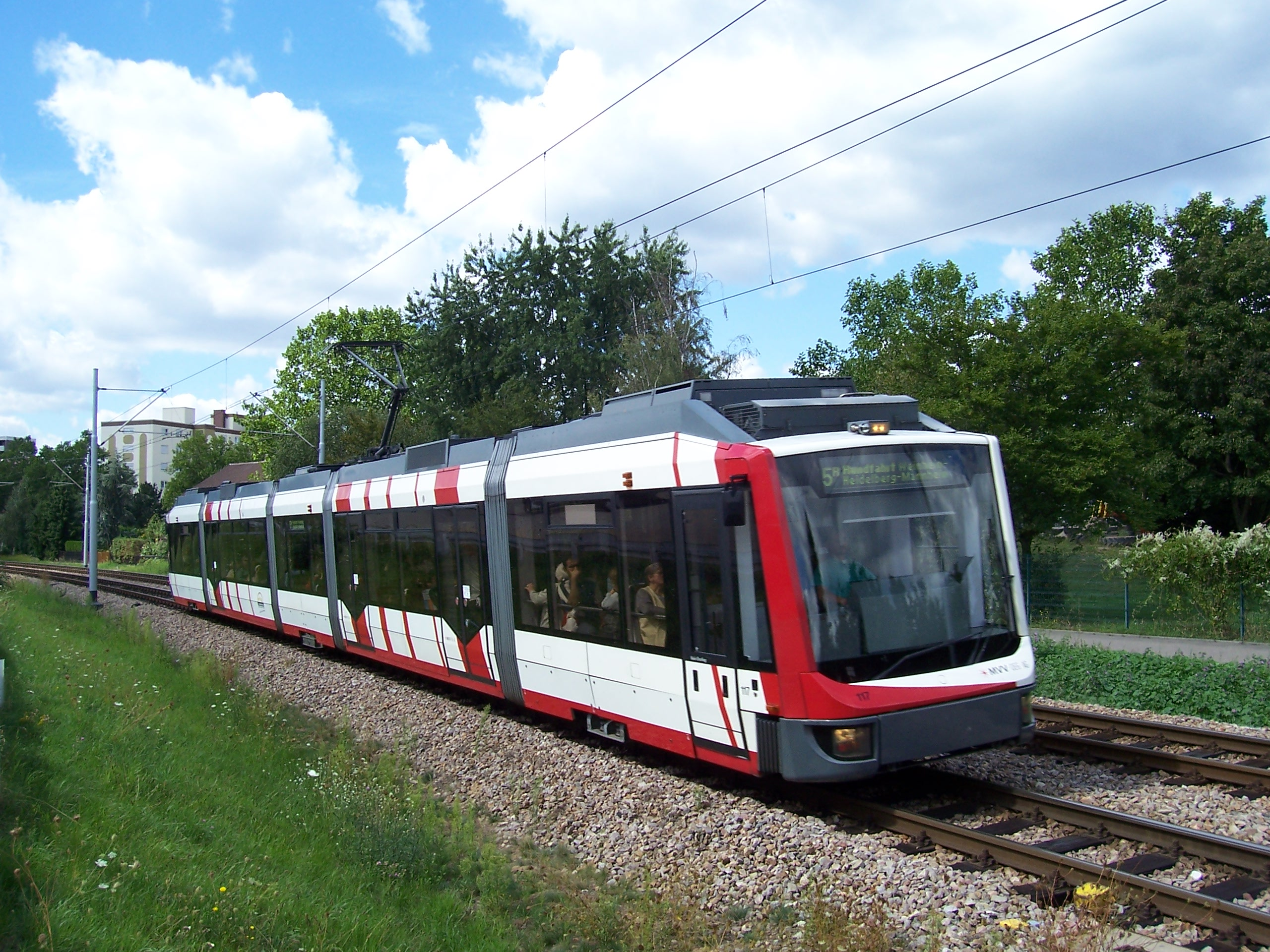
Variobahn in Mannheim, Germany

The Variotram is a low-floor light rail tram designed for city center operation. Since customers consist of both existing and new systems, and their specifications vary, the Variotram has flexibility in specifications. It can be built as uni- or bi-directional, with 70 or 100% low floor. Rail gauge can be 1,435 mm (4 ft 8 1/2 in) standard gauge or 1,000 mm (3 ft 3 3/8 in) metre gauge. Width options include 2.3 metres (7 ft 6 1/2 in), 2.4 metres (7 ft 10 1/2 in), 2.5 metres (8 ft 2 3/8 in) and 2.65 metres (8 ft 8 3/8 in). The length varies with either three, four, five or seven articulated modules. The floor height is 350 millimetres (14 in) over the rail. The seating and standing arrangements are flexible, and the trams feature 1,350 millimetres (53 in) wide doors. The tram has hub motors on all wheels, thus eliminating the need for axles and bogies. These compact motors are the key to the low-floor concept, since they can be placed under the seating. This allows the full length of the tram to be step-free accessible from the platforms.

Several of the configurations of the trams are customizable to fit each tramway. In addition to the four possible widths and choice of gauge, the trams can be custom-built for the necessary length. Trams are built modally, so that they can later be rebuilt or extended. All trams built so far have five modules and twelve wheels. The trams are available with four motor settings: four or six wheels powered with 95-kilowatt (127 hp) motors, or eight or twelve wheels with 45-kilowatt (60 hp) motors. Of the models built so far, the length has varied from 24.4 to 42.8 metres (80 to 140 ft) (Helsinki and Mannheim, respectively). Similarly, tare weight varies from 35 to 50 tonnes (34 to 49 long tons; 39 to 55 short tons). Seating capacity varies between 38 (Graz) and 100 (Heidelberg), while standing capacity peaks at 193 for the Duisburg version.

== Production ==
System	Owner	Quantity	Delivery	Length	Width	Gauge	Operation	Seats	Standing	Maximum power kW	Ref
Chemnitz Tramway	Chemnitzer Verkehrs-Aktiengesellschaft	14	1993-2000	31.4 m (103 ft 1/4 in)	2.65 m (8 ft 8 3/8 in)	1,435 mm (4 ft 8 1/2 in) standard gauge	Uni	89	123	8 x 45 kW	
Chemnitz Tramway	Chemnitzer Verkehrs-Aktiengesellschaft	10	2000	31.4 m (103 ft 1/4 in)	2.65 m (8 ft 8 3/8 in)	1,435 mm (4 ft 8 1/2 in) standard gauge	Bi	74	124	8 x 45 kW	
City-Bahn Chemnitz	City-Bahn Chemnitz	6	2001	31.4 m (103 ft 1/4 in)	2.65 m (8 ft 8 3/8 in)	1,435 mm (4 ft 8 1/2 in) standard gauge	Bi	74	124	8 x 45 kW	
Mannheim Tramway	MVV Verkehr	6	1996	32.2 m (105 ft 7 3/4 in)	2.5 m (8 ft 2 3/8 in)	1,000 mm (3 ft 3 3/8 in) metre gauge	Bi	90	100	4 x 95 kW	
Mannheim Tramway	MVV Verkehr	16	2002–07	42.7 m (140 ft 1 1/8 in)	2.4 m (7 ft 10 1/2 in)	1,000 mm (3 ft 3 3/8 in) metre gauge	Uni	129	130	6 x 95 kW	
Mannheim Tramway	MVV Verkehr	20	2002–07	30.5 m (100 ft 3/4 in)	2.4 m (7 ft 10 1/2 in)	1,000 mm (3 ft 3 3/8 in) metre gauge	Bi	80	90	4 x 95 kW	
Duisburg Stadtbahn	Duisburger Verkehrsgesellschaft	1	1996	33.8 m (110 ft 10 3/4 in)	2.3 m (7 ft 6 1/2 in)	1,435 mm (4 ft 8 1/2 in)	Bi	38	193	8 x 45 KW	
Inner West Light Rail (Sydney)	Metro Transport Sydney	7	1997-98	28.0 m (91 ft 10 3/8 in)	2.65 m (8 ft 8 3/8 in)	1,435 mm (4 ft 8 1/2 in)	Bi	74	143	8 x 45 KW	
Helsinki Tramway	Helsinki City Transport	40	1998-2004	24.4 m (80 ft 5/8 in)	2.3 m (7 ft 6 1/2 in)	1,000 mm (3 ft 3 3/8 in)	Uni	55	80	12 x 45 kW	
Heidelberg Tramway	Heidelberger Straßen- und Bergbahn	8	2002	39.4 m (129 ft 3 1/8 in)	2.4 m (7 ft 10 1/2 in)	1,000 mm (3 ft 3 3/8 in)	Bi	100	130	6 x 95 kW	
Ludwigshafen Tramway	Verkehrsbetriebe Ludwigshafen am Rhein	8	2003	30.5 m (100 ft 3/4 in)	2.4 m (7 ft 10 1/2 in)	1,000 mm (3 ft 3 3/8 in)	Uni	88	90	4 x 95 kW	
Bochum–Gelsenkirchen Tramway	Bochum-Gelsenkirchener Straßenbahnen	30	2007-11	29.6 m (97 ft 1 3/8 in)	2.3 m (7 ft 6 1/2 in)	1,000 mm (3 ft 3 3/8 in)	Bi	68	120	8 x 45 kW	
Nuremberg Tramway	Verkehrs-Aktiengesellschaft Nürnberg	8	2007	33.8 m (110 ft 10 3/4 in)	2.3 m (7 ft 6 1/2 in)	1,435 mm (4 ft 8 1/2 in)	Uni	87	147	8 x 45 kW	
Munich tramway	Münchner Verkehrsgesellschaft	14	2008-11	33.8 m (110 ft 10 3/4 in)	2.3 m (7 ft 6 1/2 in)	1,435 mm (4 ft 8 1/2 in)	Uni	87	147	8 x 45 kW	
Bergen Light Rail	Hordaland County Municipality	28	2009-17	42.2 m (138 ft 5 3/8 in)	2.65 m (8 ft 8 3/8 in)	1,435 mm (4 ft 8 1/2 in)	Bi	98	182	8 x 45 kW	
Bergen Light Rail	Vestland County Municipality	6	2022	42.2 m (138 ft 5 3/8 in)	2.65 m (8 ft 8 3/8 in)	1,435 mm (4 ft 8 1/2 in)	Bi	98	182	8 x 45 kW	
Graz Tramway	Graz AG Verkehrsbetriebe	45	2009–	27.0 m (88 ft 7 in)	2.3 m (7 ft 6 1/2 in)	1,435 mm (4 ft 8 1/2 in)	Uni	38	113	8 x 45 kW	
Potsdam Tramway	Verkehrsbetrieb Potsdam	18	2010–	32.2 m (105 ft 8 in)	2.3 m (7 ft 6 1/2 in)	1,435 mm (4 ft 8 1/2 in)	Uni	57	118	8 x 45 kW	
London Trams	Transport for London	6	2011–12	32 m (104 ft 11 7/8 in)	2.65 m (8 ft 8 3/8 in)	1,435 mm (4 ft 8 1/2 in)	Bi	72	134		
London Trams	Transport for London	6	2014–16	32 m (104 ft 11 7/8 in)	2.65 m (8 ft 8 3/8 in)	1,435 mm (4 ft 8 1/2 in)	Bi	72	134		
Aarhus Letbane	Aarhus Letbane	14	2016–17	32.56 m (106 ft 9 7/8 in)	2.65 m (8 ft 8 3/8 in)	1,435 mm (4 ft 8 1/2 in)	Bi	84	132	8 x 45 kW	
Odense Letbane	Odense Letbane	16	2020–21	32 m (104 ft 11 7/8 in)	2.65 m (8 ft 8 3/8 in)	1,435 mm (4 ft 8 1/2 in)	Bi	70	130		
