= Glauchau–Gößnitz railway =

Railway line in Germany

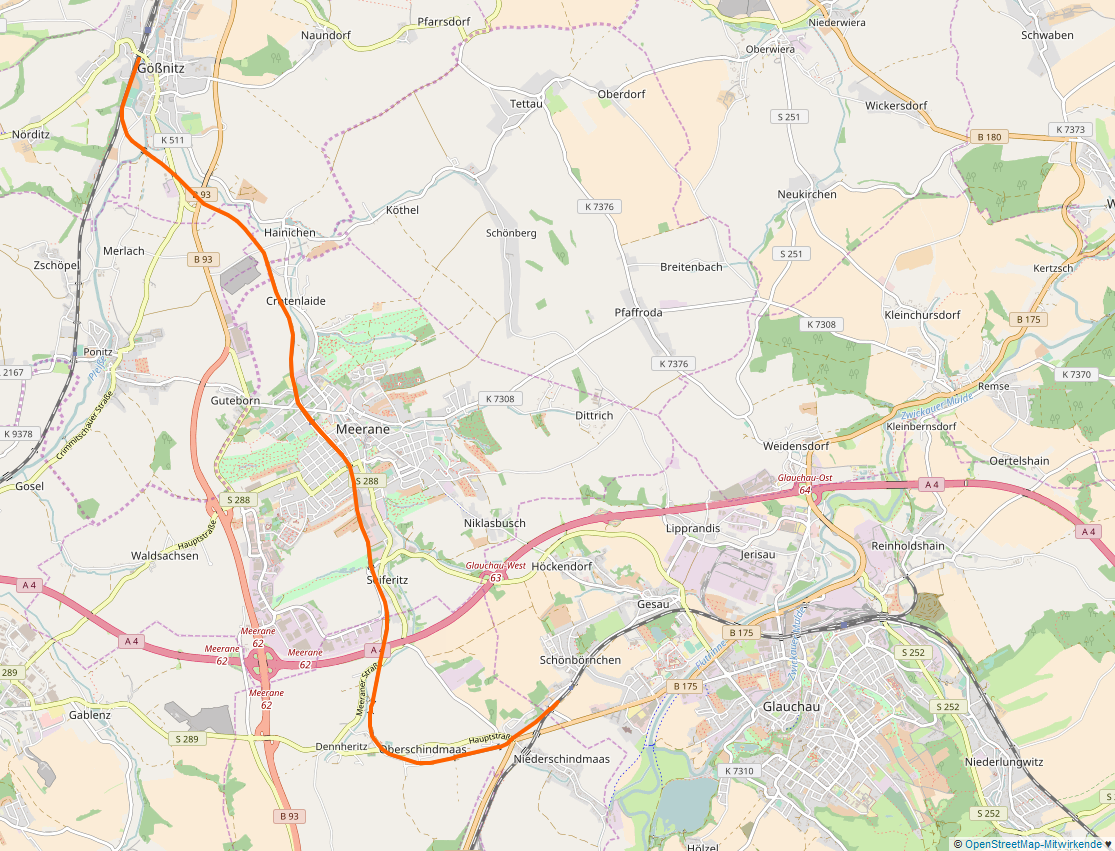

Overview
- Line number: 6265
- Locale: Saxony and Thuringia, Germany
- Termini: Glauchau-Schönbörnchen; Gößnitz

Service
- Route number: 540

Technical
- Line length: 12.373 km (7.688 mi)
- Track gauge: 1,435 mm (4 ft 8 1/2 in) standard gauge
- Minimum radius: 398 m (1,306 ft)
- Electrification: 15 kV/16.7 Hz AC Overhead catenary
- Operating speed: 100 km/h (62 mph) (maximum)
- Maximum incline: 1.0%

The Glauchau–Gößnitz railway is a single-track electrified main line railway in the German states of Saxony and Thuringia. It was originally built and operated with the support of the Saxon government and eventually became part of the Royal Saxon State Railways. It opened in 1858 and it is one of the oldest railways in Germany.

The route is an important part of the long-distance connection between the industrial district of west Saxony and western Germany (the Mid-Germany Connection). It runs from a branch on the Dresden–Werdau in Glauchau-Schönbörnchen via Meerane to a branch on the Leipzig–Hof line near Gößnitz.

== History ==
During the planning of a westerly extension of the Riesa–Chemnitz line, several routes were investigated for a connection to the Saxon-Bavarian Railway. Connections towards Zwickau, Crimmitschau and Gößnitz were discussed. A connection to Gößnitz or Crimmitschau would shorten the line from Chemnitz to Leipzig, while a line to Zwickau offered major advantages for coal transport. Ultimately, the route towards Zwickau was selected. In addition it was decided to build a short connecting line from Gößnitz to Glauchau. Its construction began on 25 June 1855 and it was opened on 15 November 1858.

The line was duplicated between 1908 and 1912.

After the Second World War the second track was dismantled in 1946 for reparations to the Soviet Union.

In the mid-1980s the line was electrified. Electric services commenced on 1 June 1986.

The Federal Transport Infrastructure Plan lists the rebuilding of the second track as an "additional need”. The last review of the plan in November 2010, however, recommends the abandonment of the construction of a second track, as long-distance transport of this route is not considered as economic and therefore a second track would not to be required.

The upgrade of the line to permit the operation of tilting trains and a line speed of 140 km/h began on 28 February 2011. This required a complete blockade of the line between Glauchau-Schönbörnchen and Gößnitz. During the construction work, all rail services were substituted by buses. In addition to the renewal of tracks and the track base, the catenary systems and the signalling and communications technology were completely renewed. Meerane station was transformed fundamentally. Overall, Deutsche Bahn spent €20 million on the upgrade of the 13 kilometre-long connection. Rail services resumed on 11 December 2011.

== Route description ==
=== Stations ===
Glauchau-Schönbörnchen (50°49′18″N 12°30′06″E)

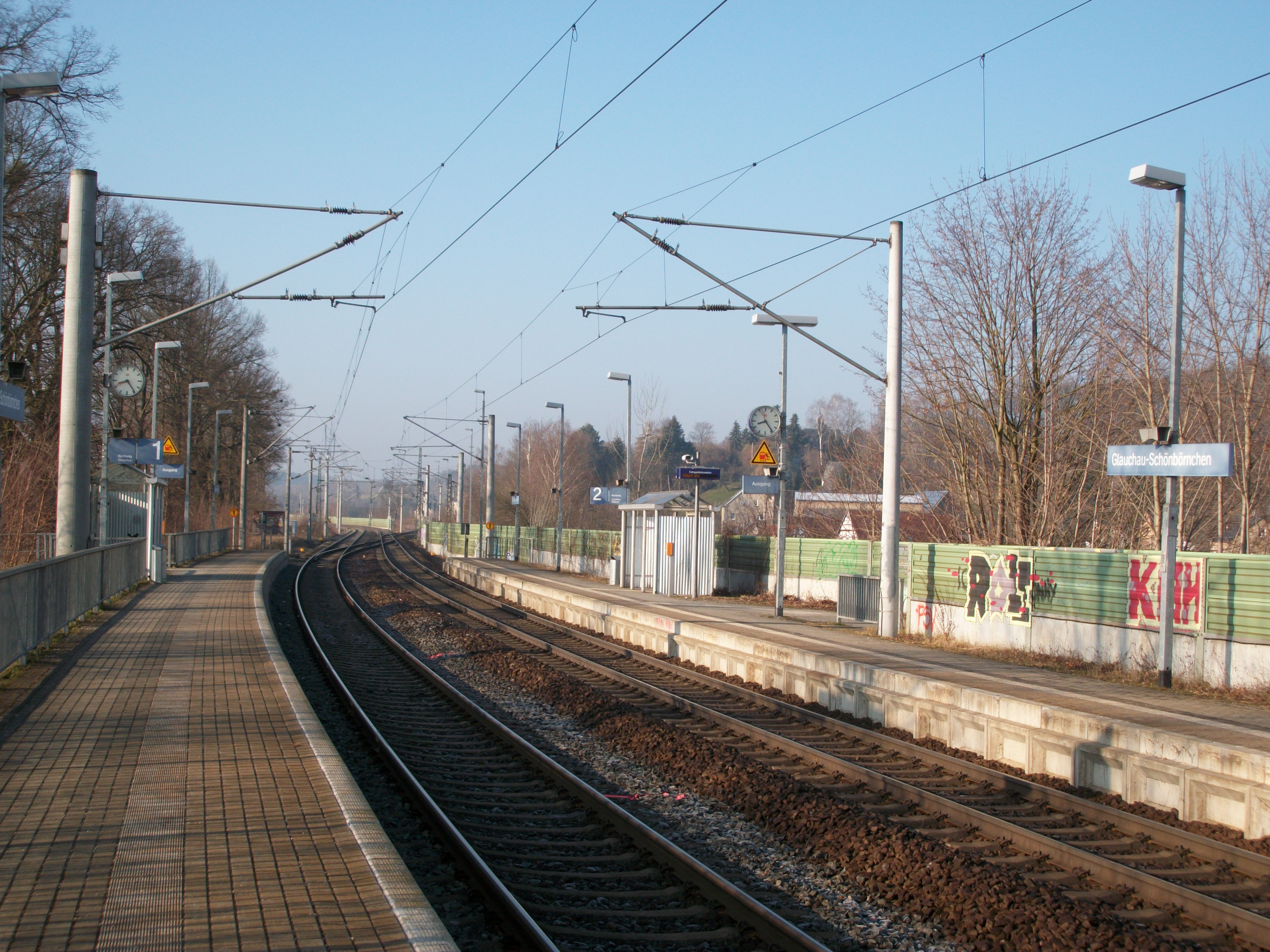
Glauchau-Schönbörnchen station (2016)

Glauchau-Schönbörnchen halt (until 1931: Schönbörnchen) has existed since 1 November 1885. There had been only a junction previously. With the control of signals and points now assigned to an electronic interlocking, the station, which was temporarily classified as a station (Bahnhof), has reverted to being a halt (Haltepunkt, that is it has no sets of points).

Dennheritz (50°48′56″N 12°28′08″E)

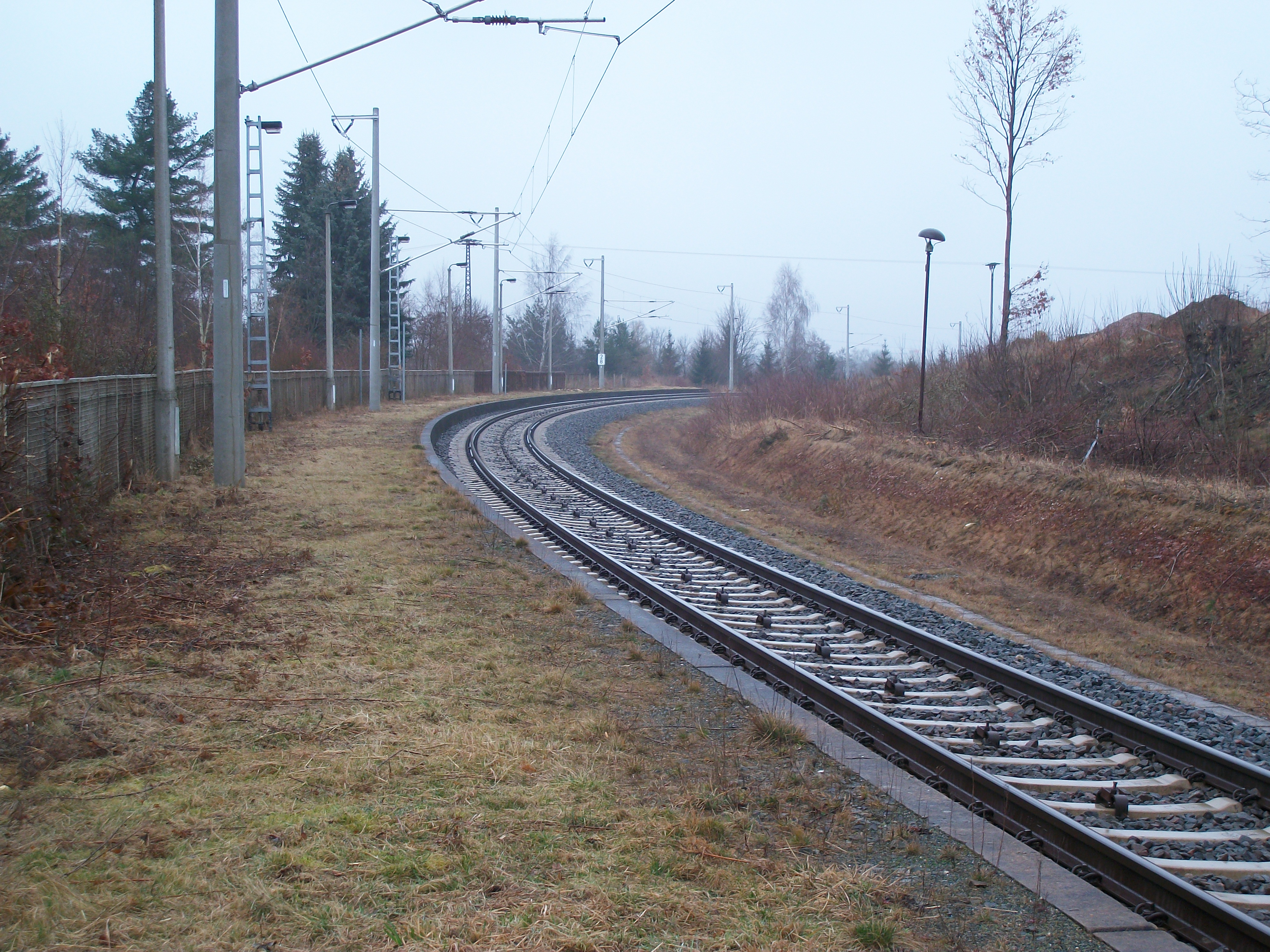
Site of the former Dennheritz station (2016)

Dennheritz halt was opened on 1 June 1897. Due to insufficient passenger numbers, it was closed on 11 December 2011.

Meerane (50°51′04″N 12°27′26″E)

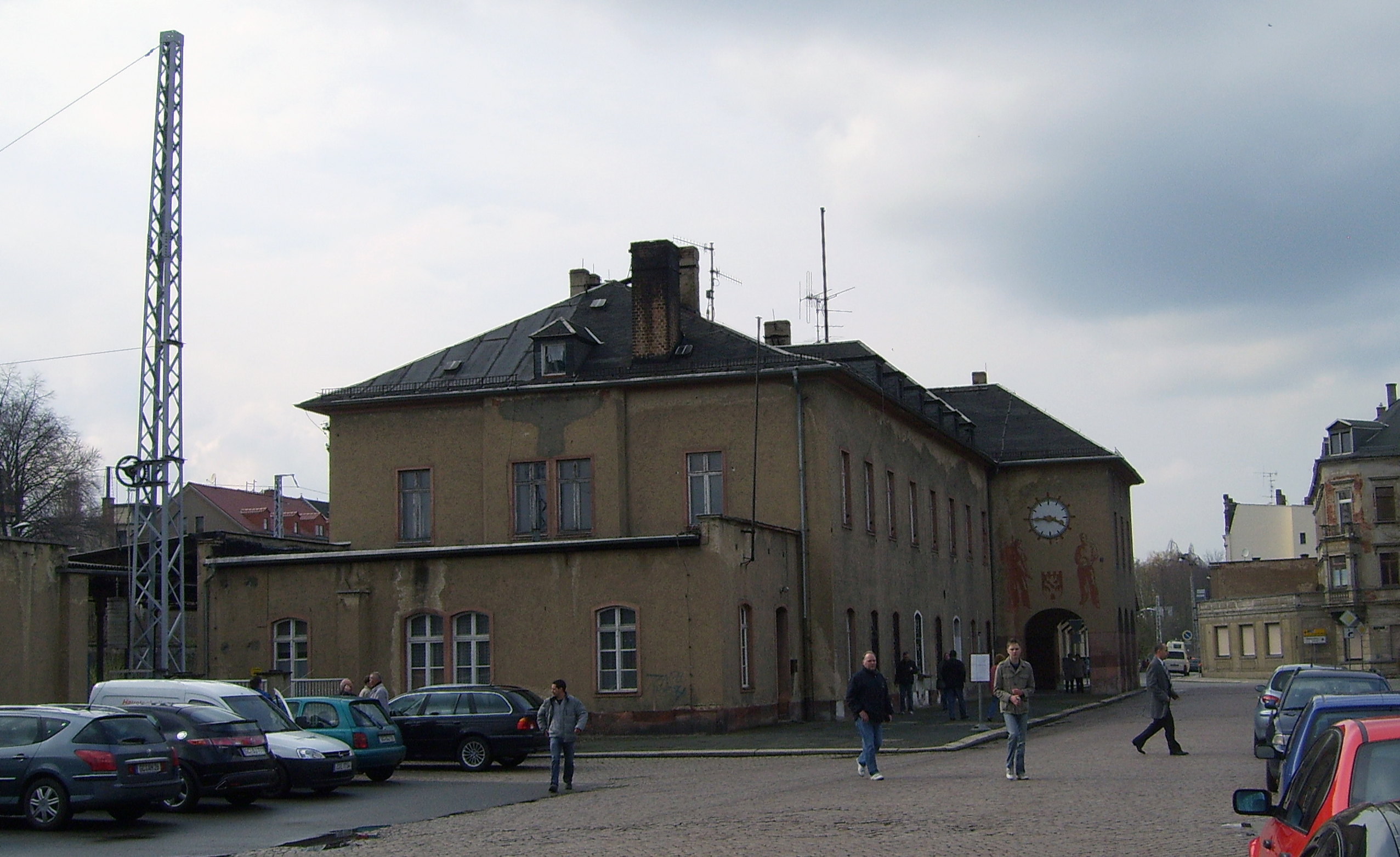
Meerane station (2008)

Meerane station is the most important non-terminal station on the line and is used for the crossings of trains. The formerly extensive freight facilities were closed in 2000 and finally completely dismantled in 2010. In the course of the renewal of the line in 2011, the station was also modernised and a barrier-free passage to the interurban bus service was established. The control of the signals and points has since been operated by a computer at the operations control centre in Leipzig via a local electronic interlocking.

The original, neo-classical entrance building dated from 1858. It was rebuilt in 1940/41 with the original decoration removed from the facade. It was demolished in 2011 and replaced by a simple functional building with a ticket machine and bicycle parking.

Gößnitz (50°53′34″N 12°25′46″E)

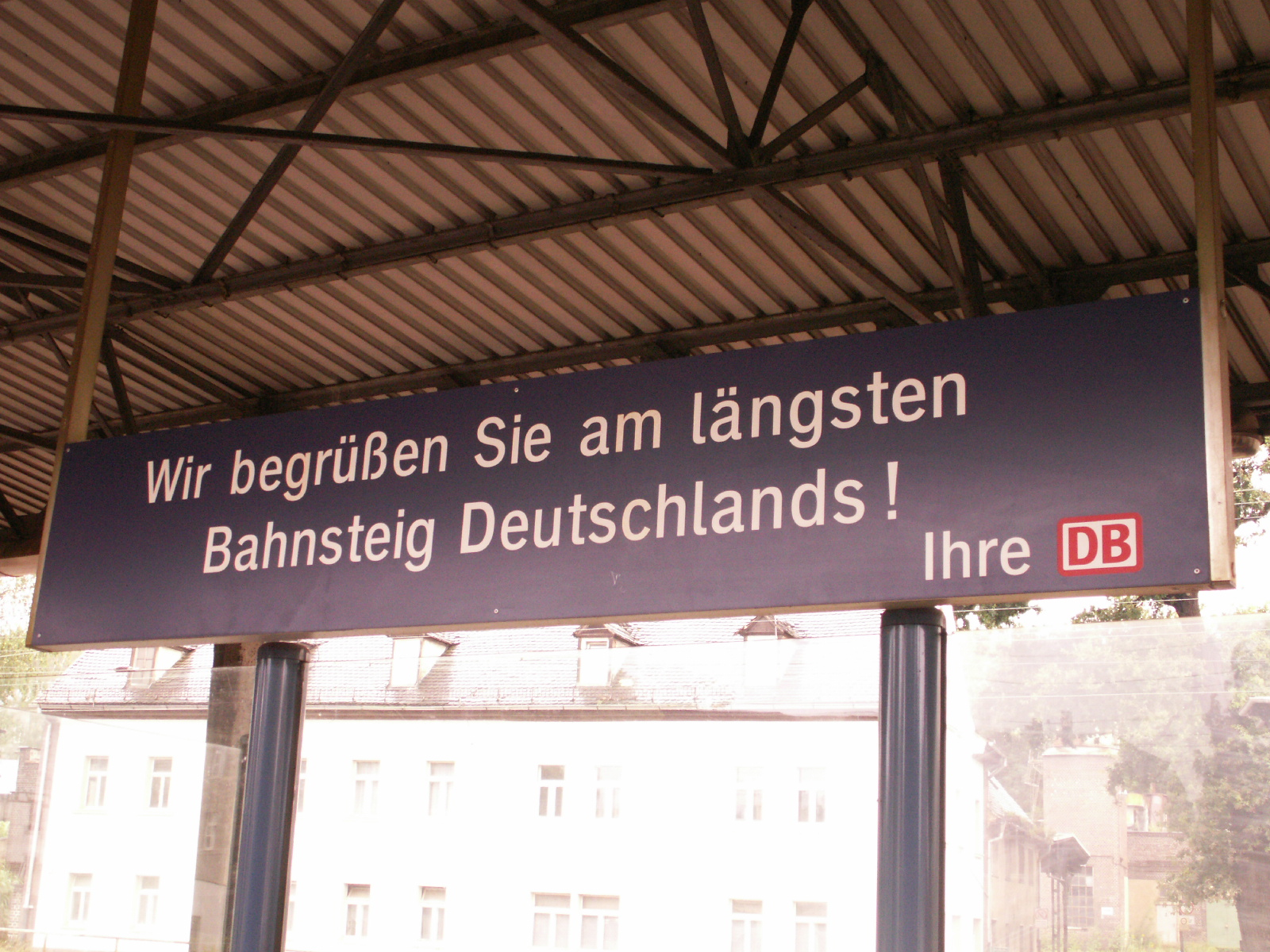
”Longest platform in Germany” sign in Gößnitz station (2007)

Gößnitz station is a link to the Leipzig–Hof and Gößnitz–Gera lines. It was opened with a sectional of the Leipzig–Hof railway in 1844. The neo-baroque reception building was demolished in 2010. An operational peculiarity is the 603.50 metre-long island platform, which can hold up to four trains at the same time. According to Deutsche Bahn AG is the longest platform in Germany.
