= Hohenstein-Ernstthal station =

Railway station in Hohenstein-Ernstthal, Germany

Hohenstein-Ernstthal
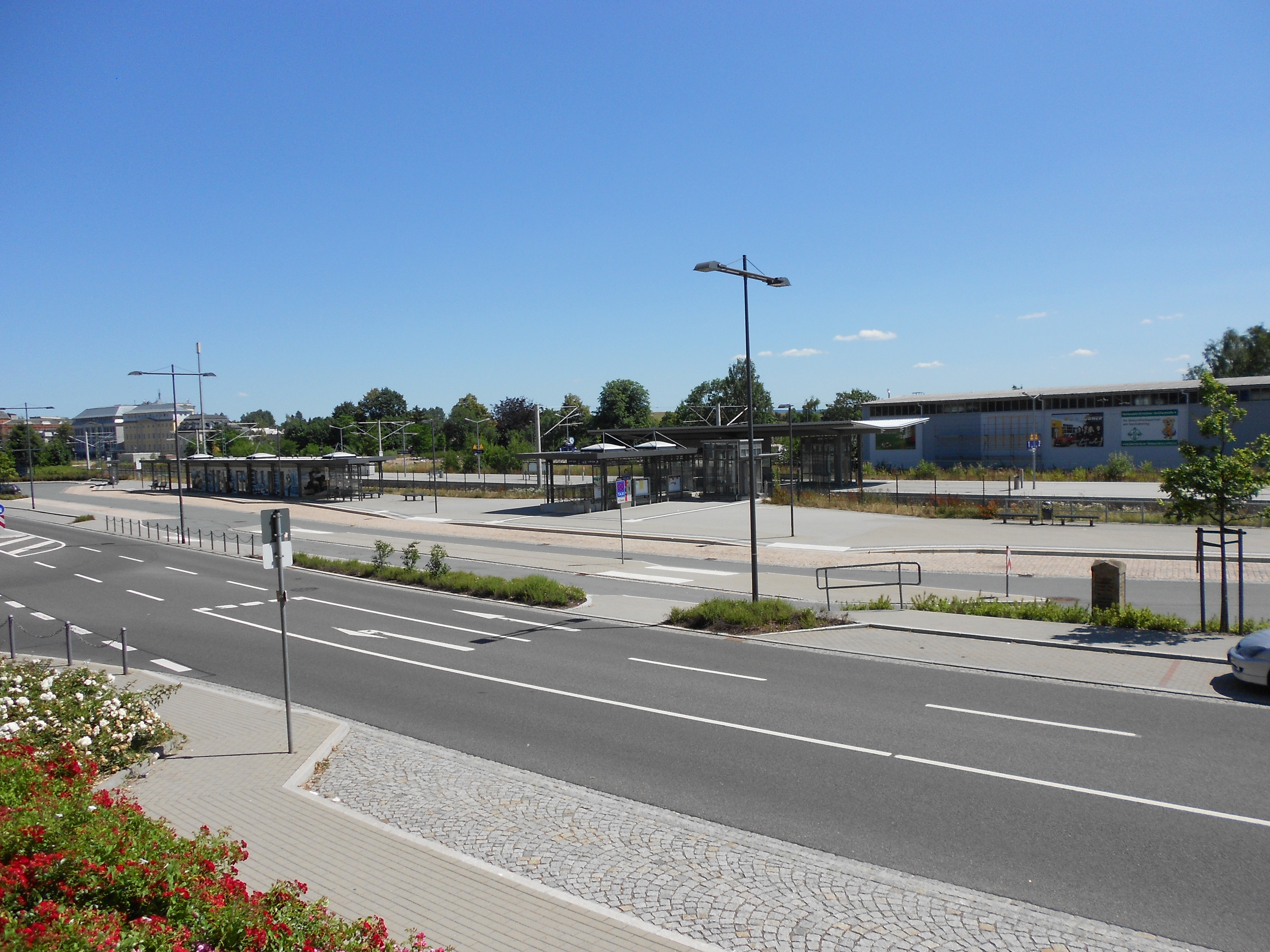
- Station in July 2013

General information
- Location: Am Bahnhof 6, Hohenstein-Ernstthal, Saxony; Germany
- Coordinates: 50°47′56″N 12°42′25″E
- Line: Dresden–Werdau railway
- Platforms: 2

Construction
- Accessible: Yes

Other information
- Station code: 2862
- DS100 code: DHO
- IBNR: 8011904
- Category: 5
- Website: www.bahnhof.de

History
- Opened: 15 November 1858

Services
Preceding station	Mitteldeutsche Regiobahn	Following station
Glauchau (Sachs) towards Hof Hbf	RE 3	Chemnitz Hbf towards Dresden Hbf
Sankt Egidien towards Zwickau Hbf	RB 30	Wüstenbrand towards Dresden Hbf
Location
- Location within Saxony Location within Germany Location within Europe

Hohenstein-Ernstthal station is the railway station of Hohenstein-Ernstthal in the south west of the German State of Saxony. The station is classified as a category 5 station by DB Station&Service and has two platform tracks. It is served daily by about 85 trains and is located on the Dresden–Werdau railway. The train station is served only by regional and local trains.

== History ==
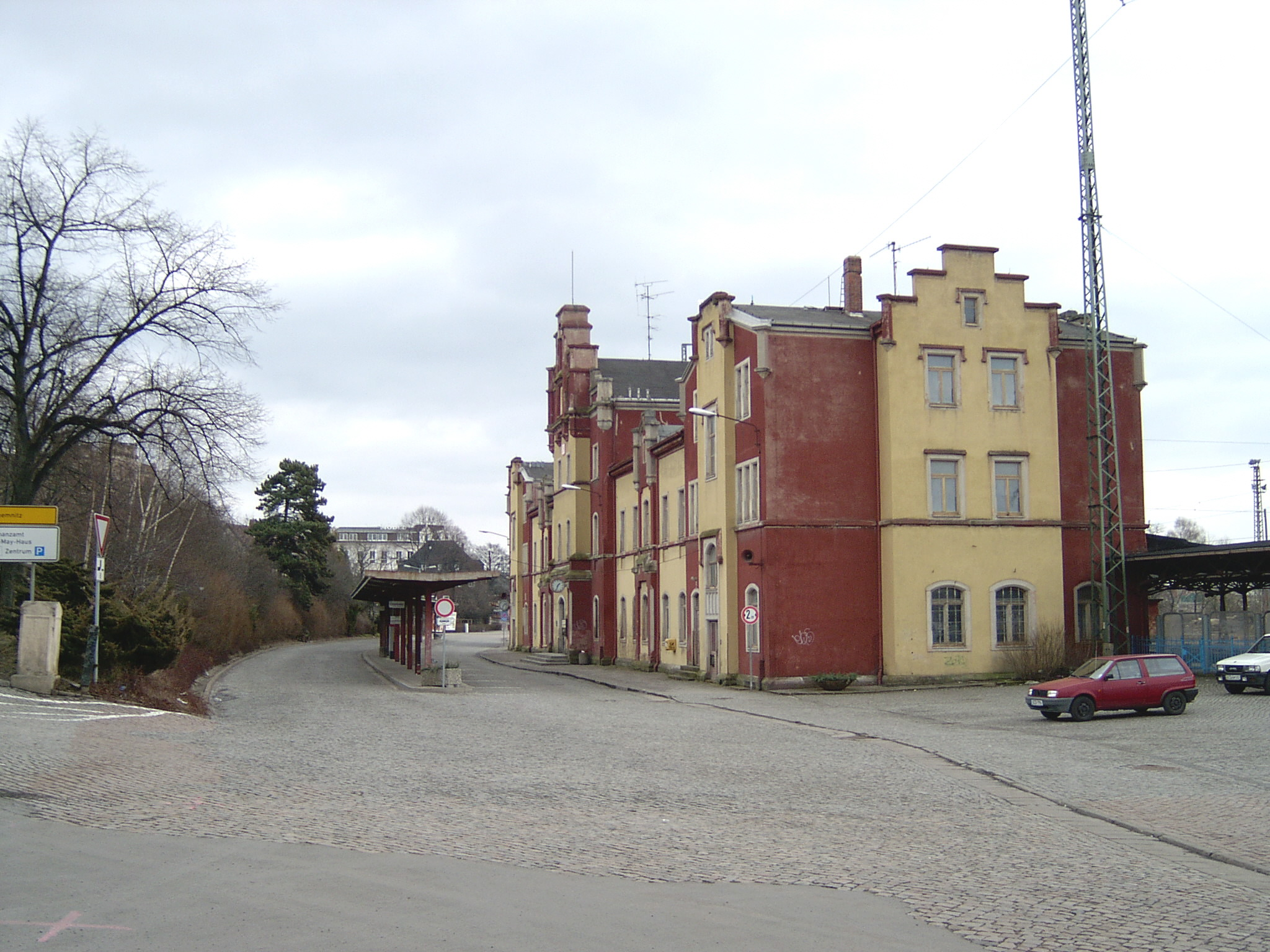
Station forecourt with entrance building, March 2003

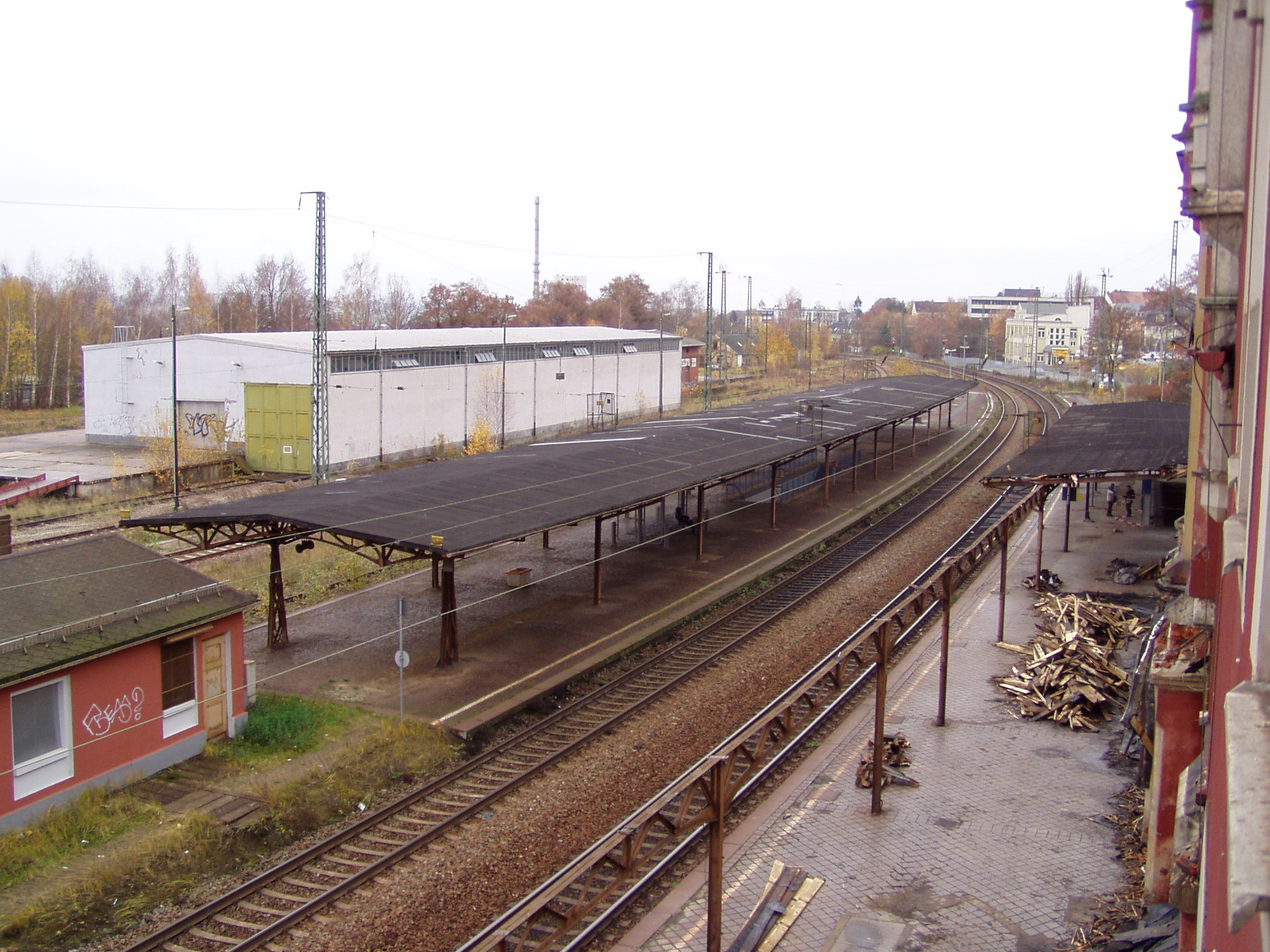
Demolition of the station in 2007

The station, which is located at line-kilometre 98.23 of the Dresden–Werdau railway, was opened on 15 November 1858. At first, the station was in neither Hohenstein nor Ernstthal, but in Oberlungwitz in the district of Abtei. The station site was later purchased by Hohenstein. From 1860 to 1887, the Hohenstein post office was located in the station building. In 1913, the station included 13 tracks. From 17 March 1913 to 26 March 1960, the station forecourt was the starting point of the Hohenstein-Ernstthal–Oelsnitz Tramway. The freight traffic of the tramway was handled next to the freight yard and two loading tracks, a transhipment track, a wooden transhipment hall with a loading crane and a siding to the freight shed were built. Until the summer timetable change on 30 May 1976, the so-called Stadt- und Vorortbahnverkehr ("urban and suburban railway service", an S-Bahn-like system) operated between Hohenstein-Ernstthal and Flöha.

The freight yard was closed on 31 December 2000. The two signal boxes were demolished in September 2006 and extensive reconstruction has taken place since 2007. The Tudor-style entrance building was demolished in 2007 and replaced by a low-rise building and the railway station was redeveloped to remove barriers to access. The then redesigned station forecourt was opened on 9 July 2009; a Turmwagen ("tower car", a vehicle designed for the maintenance of the tramway’s overhead wire) was erected on the forecourt as a monument to the former tramway. In 2010, work started on the replacement of the platform, leading to the construction of a platform on the former loading road. The platform next to the station building and the original island platform were completely demolished and replaced by a new barrier-free island platform. The new station was officially opened on 2 August 2011.

== Description ==
=== Former entrance building ===
At its opening on 15 November 1858, the entrance building consisted only of the structure that later became its middle section. From 1860 to 1887, the post and telegraph office was in the entrance building. In 1899 to 1902, the building was expanded, with two annexes erected to the right and left of the existing building. The building now included a ticket office, a baggage handling office, a restaurant, a snackbar, an information desk and toilets. In addition, twelve railway apartments were spread over two floors. In 1985 the entrance building was painted for the last time in wine red and gold. As the building had increasingly decayed, it was first blocked off because of a risk of collapse and then it was demolished in 2007.

=== The modern station ===
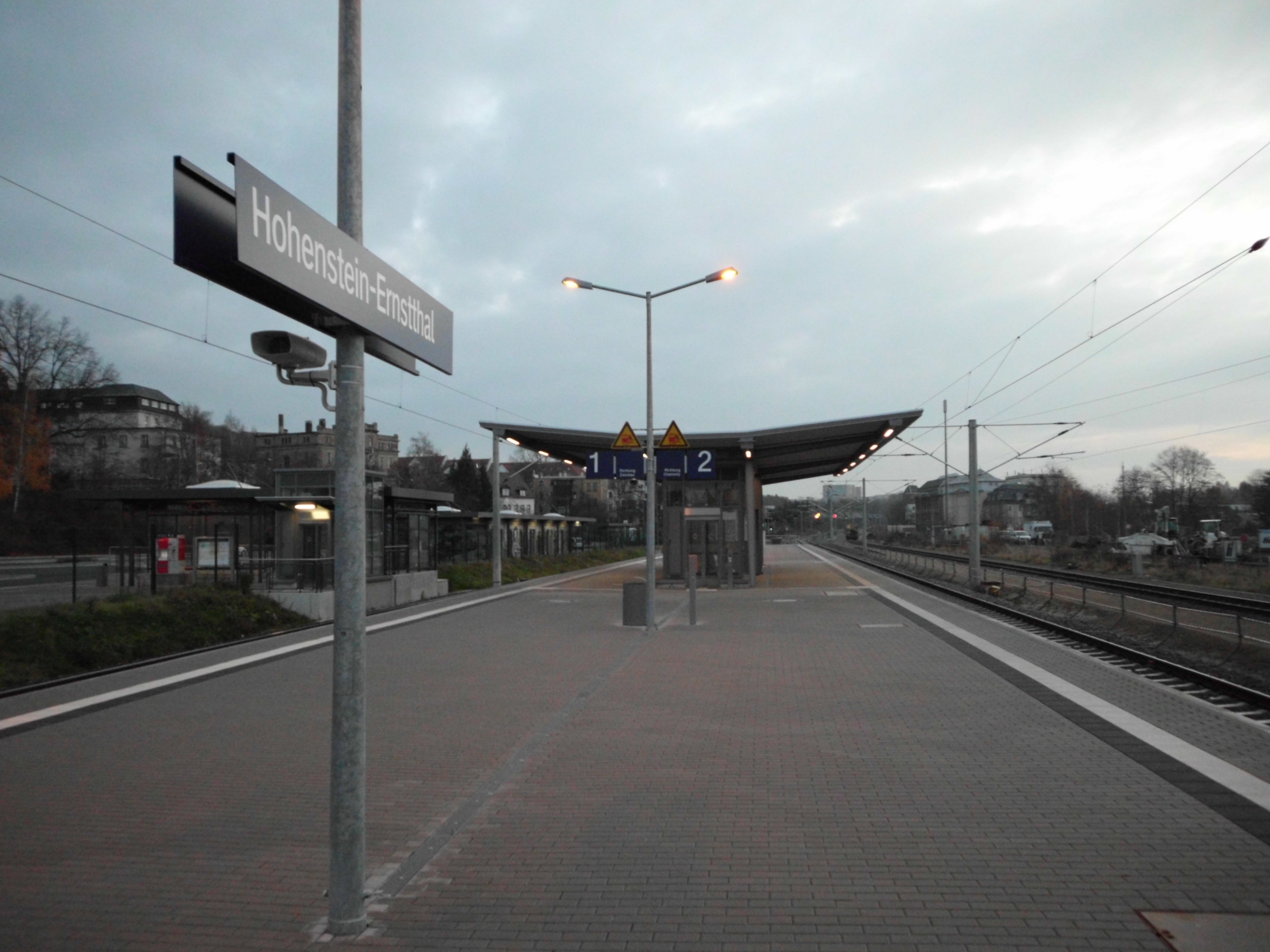
Island platform with tracks 1 and 2

Hohenstein-Ernstthal station now has three main through tracks. The third track still provides access for road–rail vehicles. The island platform is fully accessible, with lifts as well as with markings and tactile paving for the blind and visually impaired. The two platforms are 170 m long and 55 cm high. There are also a Mitteldeutsche Regiobahn partner agency (ticket office), a waiting room, a toilet, a store for travel necessities, parking lots and bicycle parking spaces in the station forecourt.

== Regional services ==
Line	Route	Frequency	Operator
RE 3	Dresden – Tharandt − Freiberg – Chemnitz – Hohenstein-Ernstthal − Glauchau − Zwickau − Reichenbach − Plauen (Vogtland) − Hof	hourly	Mitteldeutsche Regiobahn
RB 30	Dresden − Tharandt − Freiberg − Oederan − Flöha – Niederwiesa – Chemnitz − Hohenstein-Ernstthal − Glauchau − Zwickau	hourly	Mitteldeutsche Regiobahn
