= City-Bahn Chemnitz =

German railway company

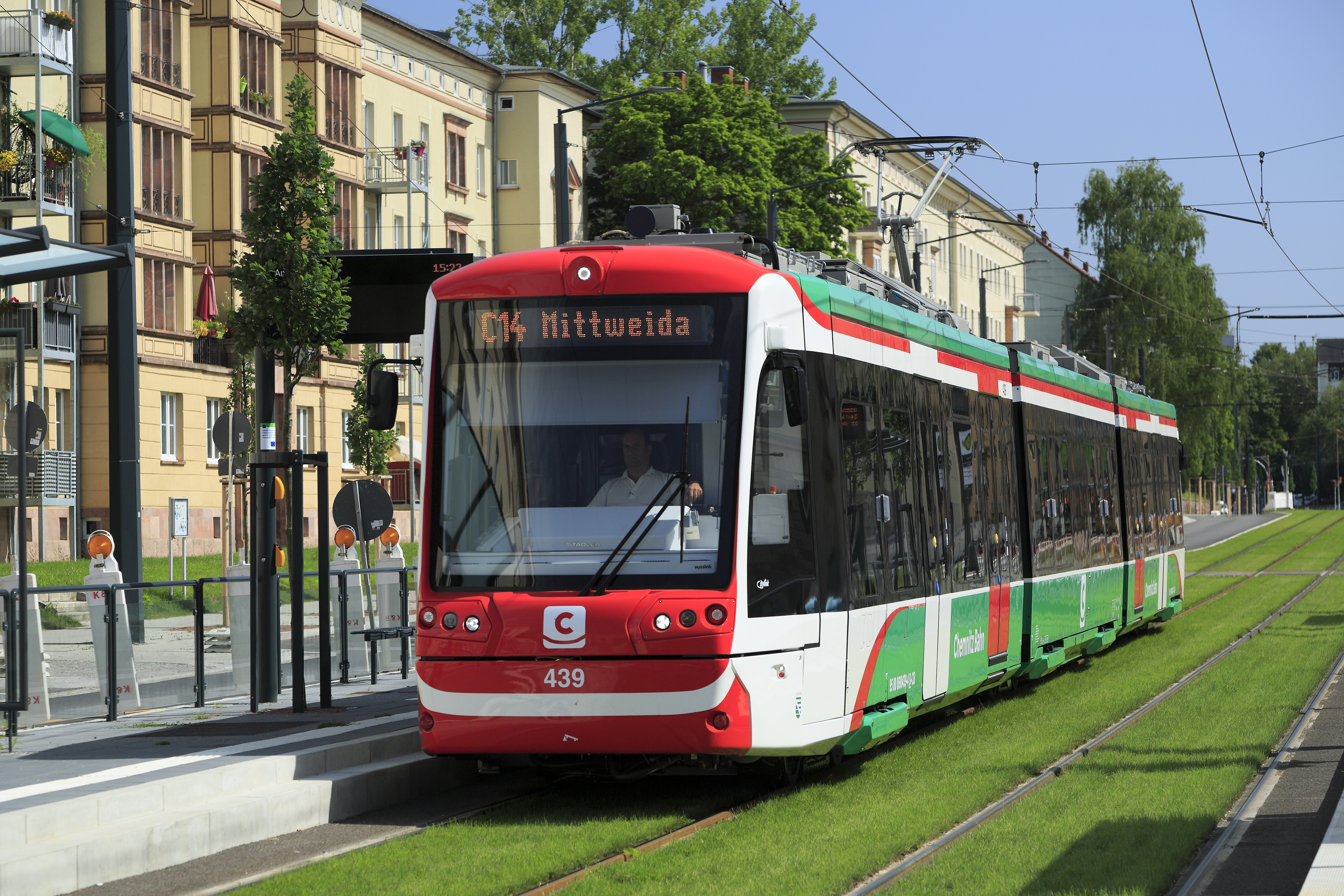
- City-Bahn tram-train in Chemnitz
- Main region: Saxony, Germany
- Fleet: 8 Vossloh Citylink, 6 Stadler Regio-Shuttle RS1, 6 Variobahn
- Parent company: ZVMS, VVHC

Technical
- Track gauge: 1,435 mm (4 ft 8 1/2 in) standard gauge

Other
- Website: www.city-bahn.de

The City-Bahn Chemnitz is a railway company which operates tram-train and regional rail services in and around Chemnitz, in Saxony, Germany. The tram-train services run both on the railway network and the urban tram network in Chemnitz. City-Bahn Chemnitz was founded on March 10, 1997.

== Routes and Rolling Stock ==
Tram-train network of City-Bahn Chemnitz, as of 2022

City-Bahn Chemnitz runs services on a number of routes around Chemnitz under contract for the Verkehrsverbund Mittelsachsen.

The tram-train from Chemnitz to Stollberg (now line C11) was the original pilot route (Stage 0) of the Chemnitz Model and is operated with electric Variobahn trams.

From December 2015 City-Bahn Chemnitz began operating Regio-Shuttle railcars on the routes Chemnitz – Burgstädt, Stollberg – St. Egidien – Glauchau, Chemnitz – Hainichen. Eight electro-diesel Citylink tram-train vehicles had been ordered from Vossloh in 2012. These were intended to enter service in 2015 but delays in the approval of the vehicles meant they did not begin operation until 2016. Stage 1 of the tram-train network began operation in October 2016, with the Citylink vehicles running new routes C13 (Chemnitz–Burgstädt), C14 (Chemnitz–Mittweida) and C15 (Chemnitz–Hainichen).

From May 2017 the lines C13-C15 were extended to Chemnitz Stadlerplatz and then in December 2017 to Chemnitz Technopark. At the end of January 2022 tram-train services were extended over the railway network from Technopark. Line C13 now links Burgstädt and Aue and line C14 runs from Mittweida as far as Thalheim.

In addtition to the tram-train services City-Bahn Chemnitz also operates services with Regio-Shuttle railcars on lines RB 37 between Glauchau and Gößnitz and line RB 92 between Stollberg, Sankt Egidien and Glauchau.

== Gallery ==
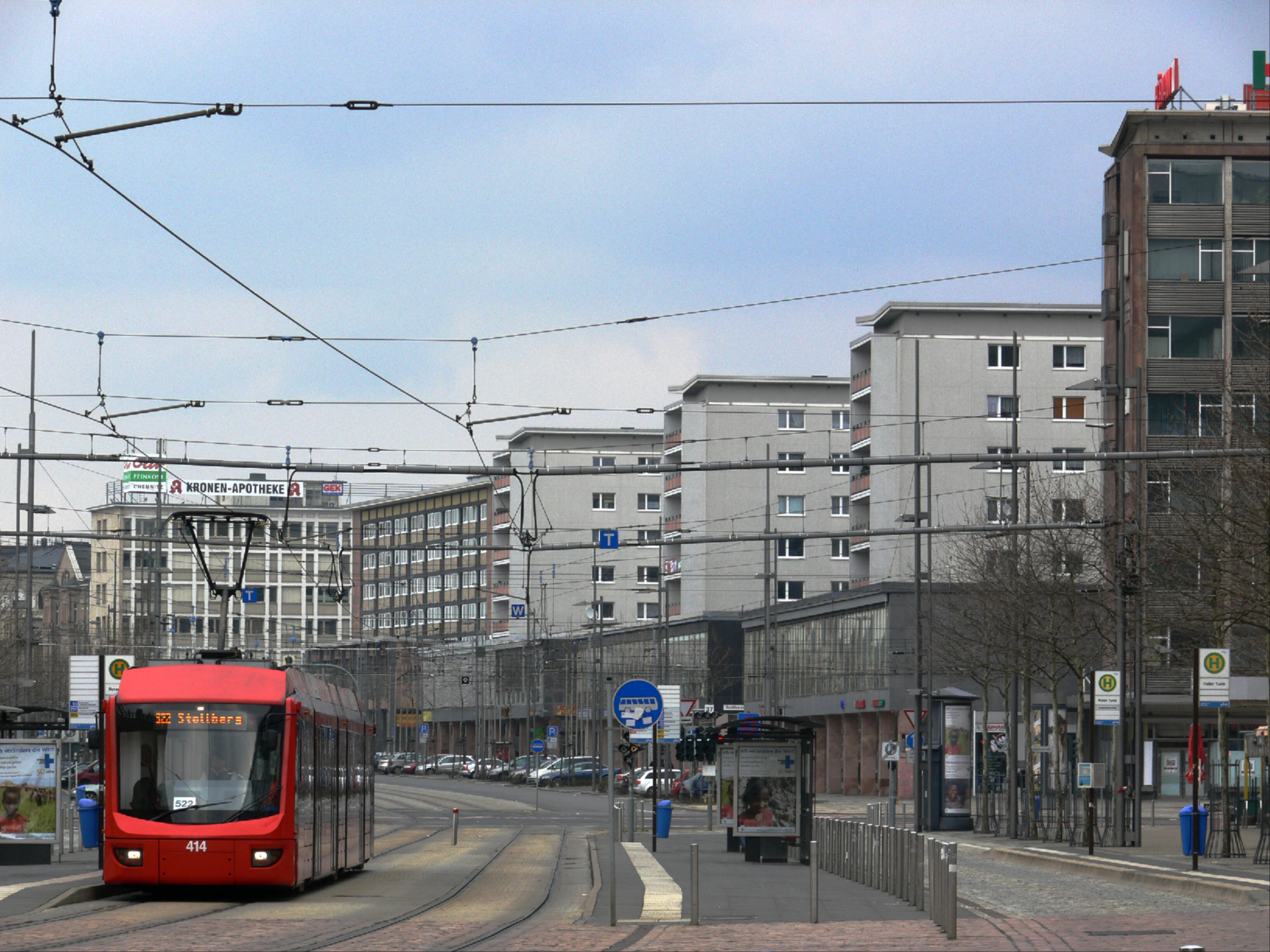
A Variobahn unit towards Stollberg in central Chemnitz running on urban tram network. (April 2010)

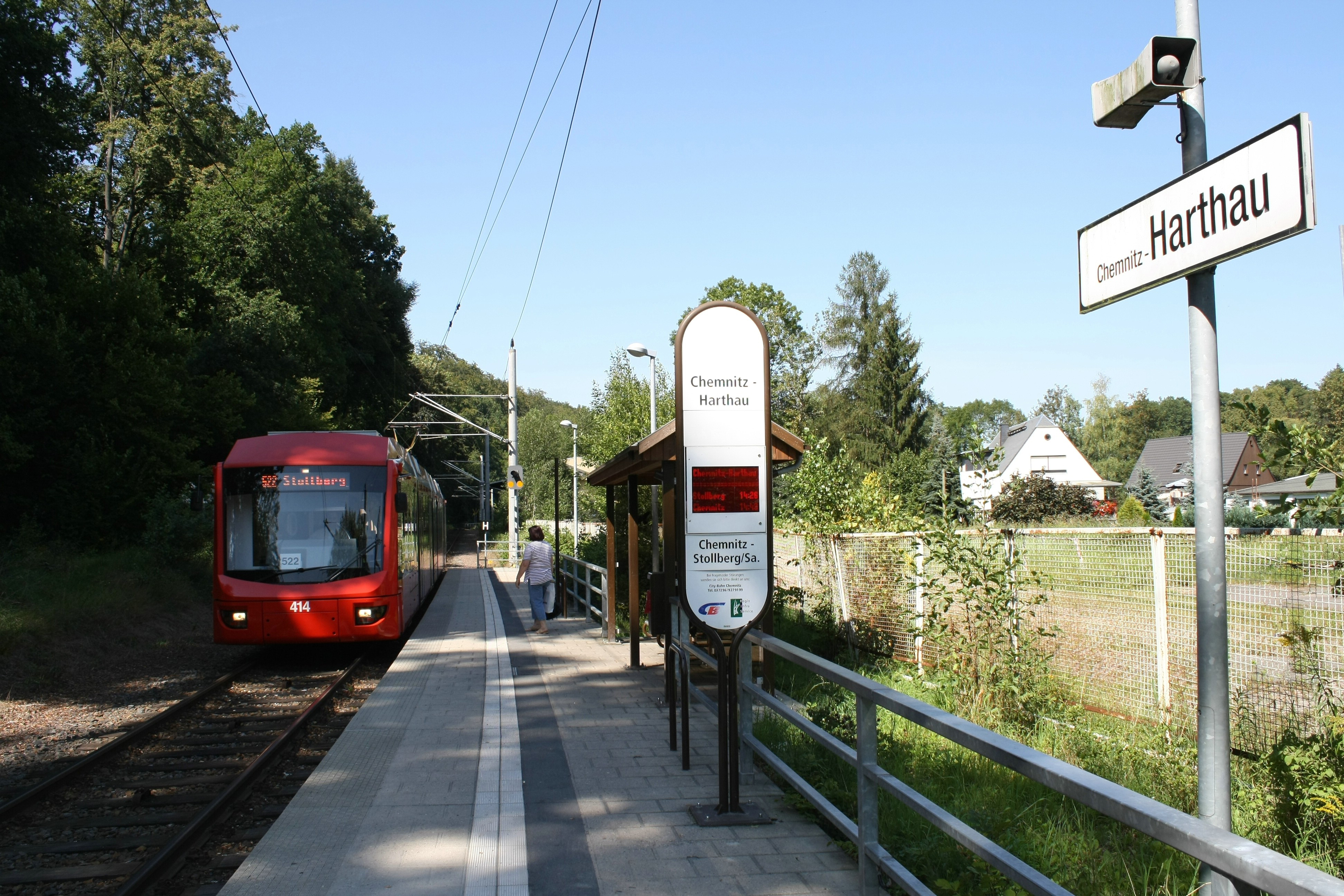
A Variobahn unit outside Chemnitz running as a suburban train to Stollberg along electrified Zwönitz–Stollberg–Chemnitz railway. (March 2016)

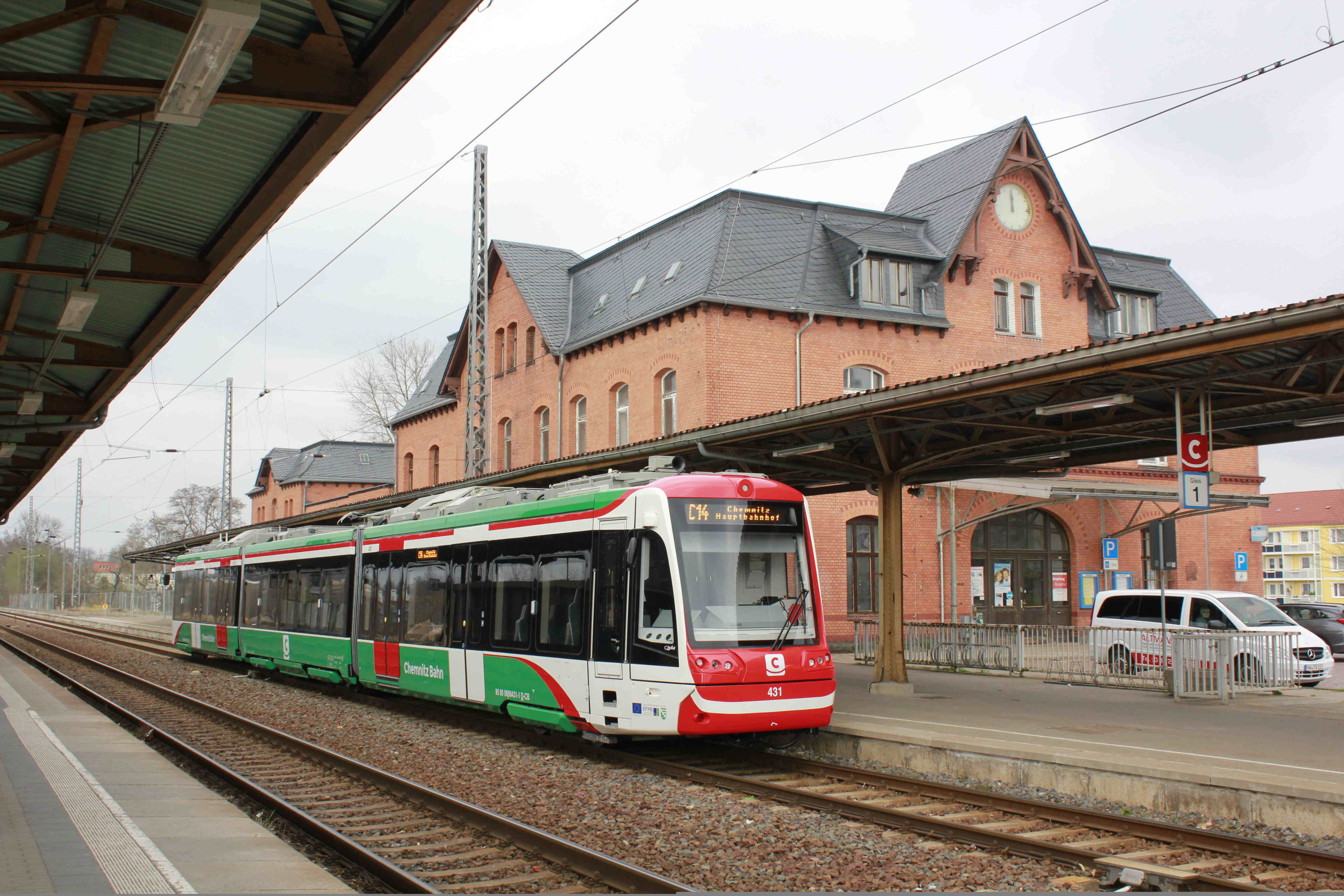
A Vossloh Citylink unit at Mittweida station along Riesa–Chemnitz railway line. (April 2016)

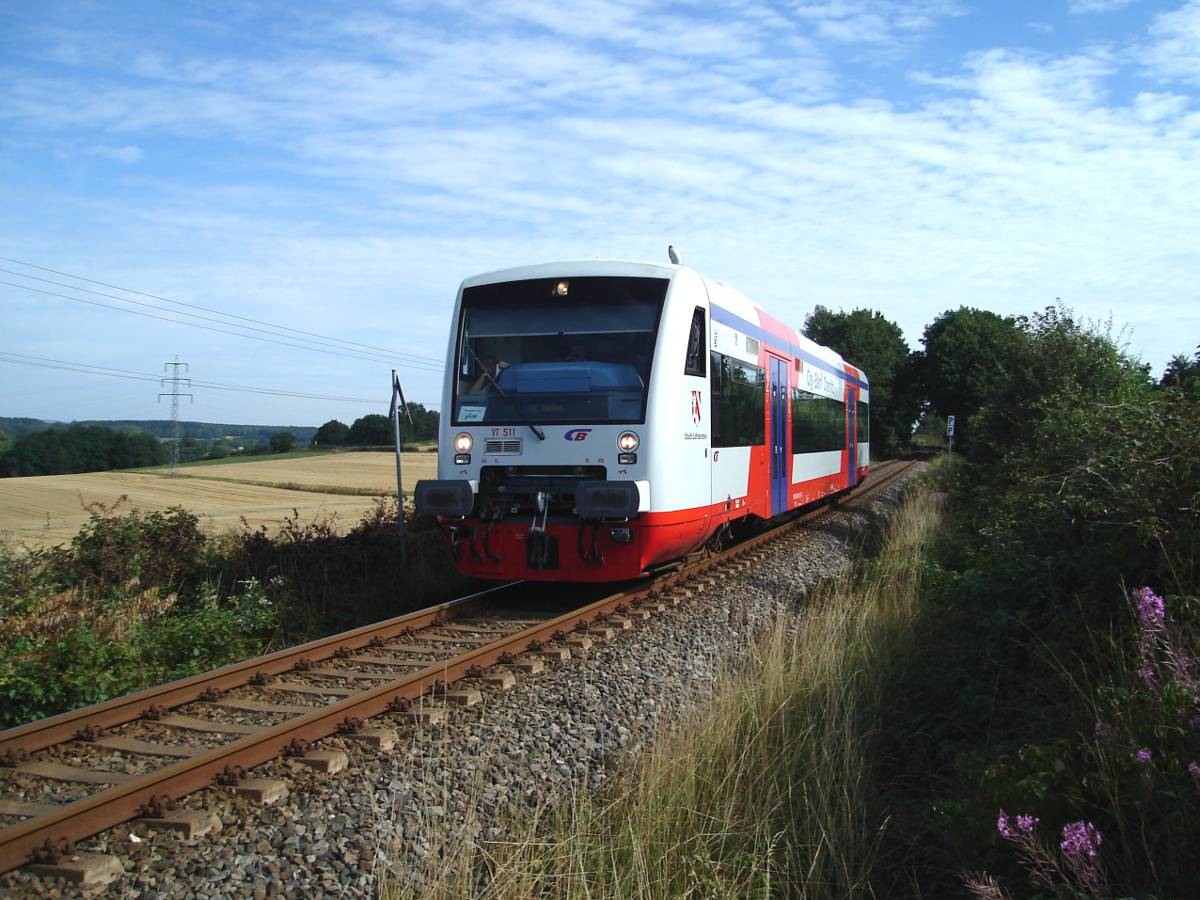
A Stadler Regio-Shuttle RS1 unit along Stollberg–St. Egidien railway line. (August 2012)

== See also ==
- Chemnitz Model
