= Verkehrsverbund Mittelsachsen =

Verkehrsverbund Mittelsachsen (VMS)
- Industry: Public transport
- Founded: 5 November 1997
- Headquarters: Chemnitz, Germany
- Area served: Chemnitz, Central Saxony
- Website: www.vms.de

The Verkehrsverbund Mittelsachsen (VMS) (English "Central Saxony Transport Group") is a local transport authority in the Chemnitz area in Saxony, Germany.

== Transport area ==
VMS delivers public transport across the Chemnitz area, including the city of Chemnitz as well as the surrounding districts of Zwickau, Mittelsachsen and Erzgebirgskreis. VMS covers an area of 5,115 km² with 1.23 million residents. Verkehrsverbund Mittelsachsen currently engages with 24 separate transport companies to deliver its services, which employ around 4,000 staff.

== History ==
VMS was formed on 5 November 1997, after two years of planning, and seven years after the original proposals to join the area under one transport authority. The first common timetable for the area covered by VMS was introduced from 24 May 1998.

Common fares for the entire area were introduced from 1 January 2002.

From 2004 to 2014, VMS published the customer magazine "vbs mobil", with originally three, then later six, editions per year. Relevant service information in the magazine is now provided by the transport companies within the VMS area.
