= Arnstadt Hauptbahnhof =

Railway station in Arnstadt, Germany

Arnstadt Hbf
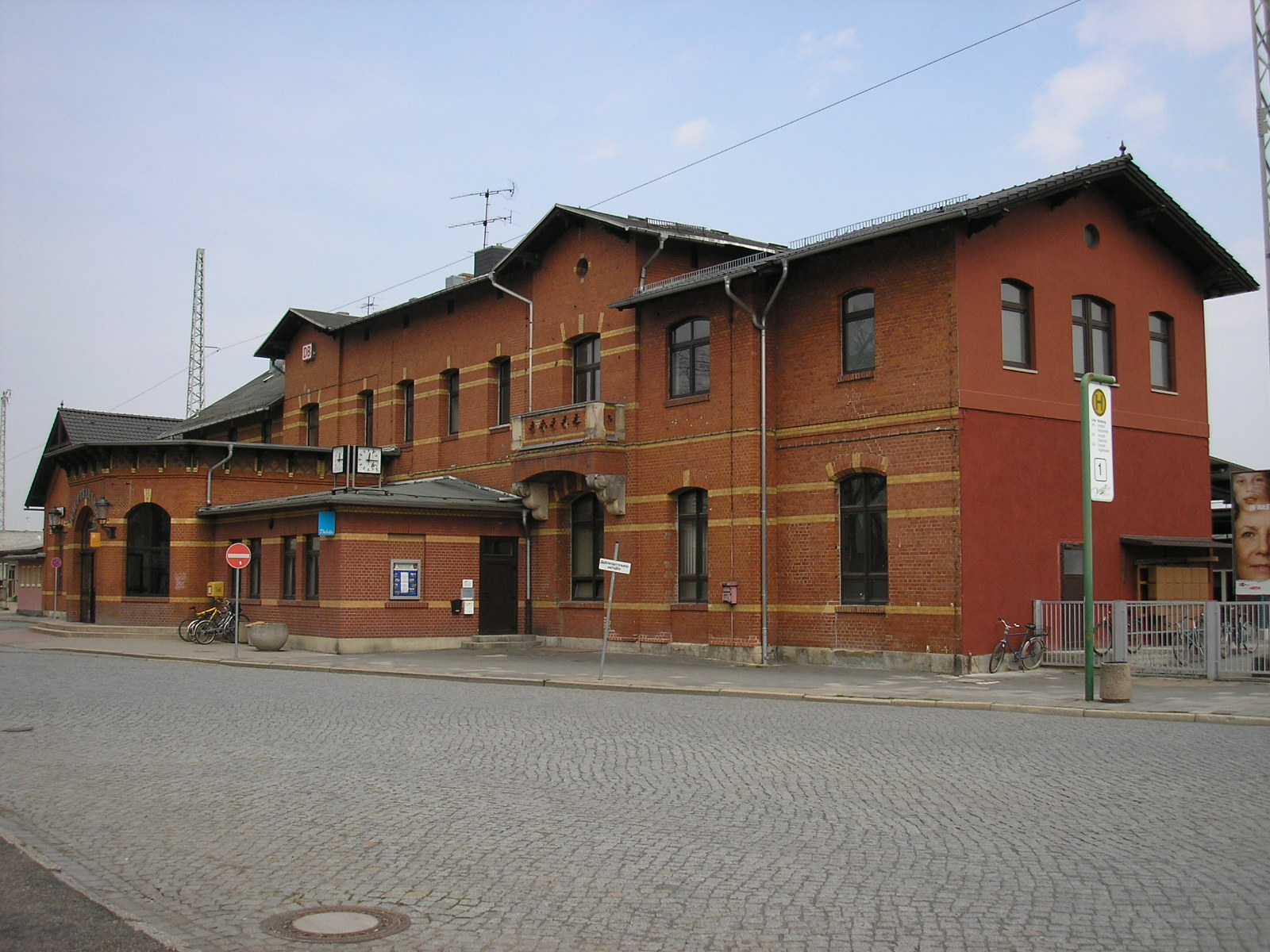
- The station building

General information
- Location: Arnstadt, Ilm-Kreis, Thuringia; Germany
- Coordinates: 50°50′31″N 10°56′51″E
- Lines: Erfurt-Schweinfurt; Arnstadt–Saalfeld; Arnstadt-Ichtershausen

Other information
- Station code: 0180
- DS100 code: UA
- IBNR: 10007
- Category: 5
- Website: www.bahnhof.de

History
- Opened: 1867

Services
Preceding station	DB Regio Südost	Following station
Neudietendorf towards Erfurt Hbf	RE 7	Plaue towards Würzburg Hbf
Preceding station		Following station
Haarhausen towards Erfurt Hbf	RB 23	Marlishausen towards Saalfeld (Saale)
Preceding station		Following station
Arnstadt Süd towards Ilmenau	RE 45	Neudietendorf towards Erfurt Hbf
Arnstadt Süd towards Meiningen	RE 50	Neudietendorf towards Erfurt Hbf
Arnstadt Süd towards Meiningen	RB 44	Neudietendorf towards Erfurt Hbf
Arnstadt Süd towards Ilmenau	RB 46	Haarhausen towards Erfurt Hbf
Location
- Location within Thuringia Location within Germany Location within Europe

Arnstadt Hauptbahnhof or Arnstadt Central Station is a railway station in the town of Arnstadt in Thuringia, Germany. It is situated on the meeting point of the Erfurt-Schweinfurt, Arnstadt–Saalfeld and Arnstadt-Ichtershausen lines.

== History ==
The station was opened on May 16, 1867, then as the southern terminus of the railway line to Erfurt. In 1869, a line to Plaue and Ilmenau was added at the southern end of the station. In 1894, a third line to Saalfeld was opened.

The station saw a number of long-distance services calling before World War II, for example the fast trains from Berlin to Stuttgart. Its importance diminished however after the German division, even though it still had long distance trains to Suhl and Berlin calling at the station. In the 1990s, InterRegio services were called at Arnstadt.

The former depot is now used as a depot for heritage steam engines.

== Rail services ==
The station is served by the following services:

Service	Route	Frequency
RE 7	Erfurt Hbf - Neudietendorf - Arnstadt Hbf - Plaue (Thür) - Gräfenroda - Oberhof (Thür) - Zella-Mehlis - Suhl - Grimmenthal - Mellrichstadt - Bad Neustadt - Münnerstadt - Ebenhausen (Unterfr) - Schweinfurt Hbf - Würzburg Hbf	Every 2 hours
RE 45	Erfurt Hauptbahnhof – Neudietendorf – Arnstadt – Arnstadt Süd – Ilmenau Pörlitzer Höhe – Ilmenau	Some trains
RE 50	Erfurt – Neudietendorf – Arnstadt – Arnstadt Süd – Plaue – Gräfenroda – Zella-Mehlis – Suhl – Grimmenthal – Meiningen	2 train pairs
RB 23	Erfurt Hbf - Neudietendorf - Arnstadt Hbf - Marlishausen - Niederwillingen - Stadtilm - Singen (Thür) - Paulinzella - Rottenbach - Quittelsdorf - Bad Blankenburg - Saalfeld (Saale)	Every 2 hours
RB 44	Erfurt Hbf - Erfurt-Bischleben - Neudietendorf - Sülzenbrücken - Haarhausen - Arnstadt Hbf - Arnstadt Süd - Plaue (Thür) - Gräfenroda - Dörrberg - Gehlberg - Oberhof (Thür) - Zella-Mehlis - Suhl - Suhl-Heinrichs - Dietzhausen - Rohr (Thür) - Grimmenthal - Untermaßfeld - Meiningen	Every 2 hours
RB 46	Erfurt Hbf - Erfurt-Bischleben - Neudietendorf - Sülzenbrücken - Haarhausen - Arnstadt Hbf - Arnstadt Süd - Plaue (Thür) - Martinroda - Geraberg - Elgersburg - Ilmenau-Roda - Ilmenau Pörlitzer Höhe - Ilmenau	Hourly
