= Neudietendorf station =

Railway station in Nesse-Apfelstädt, Germany

Neudietendorf
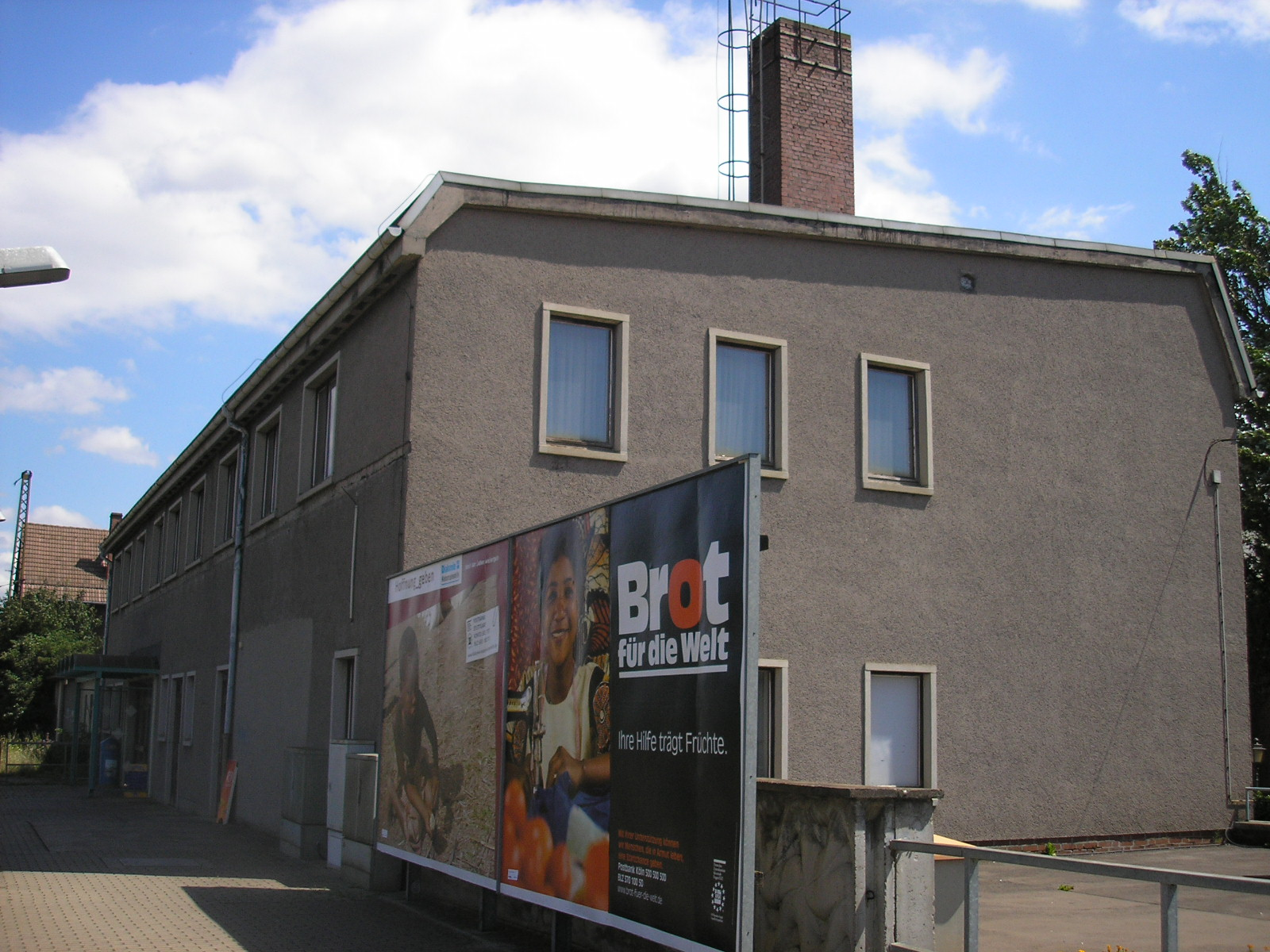
- 2007

General information
- Location: Bahnhofstraße 8; 99192 Neudietendorf; Thuringia, Germany
- Coordinates: 50°54′50″N 10°54′37″E
- Elevation: 252 m (827 ft)
- Owner: Deutsche Bahn
- Operator: DB Station&Service
- Lines: Halle–Bebra (KBS 605); Neudietendorc–Ritschenhausen (KBS 570)
- Platforms: 1 island platform 1 side platform
- Tracks: 5
- Train operators: Abellio Rail Mitteldeutschland; DB Regio Südost; Erfurter Bahn; Süd-Thüringen-Bahn

Construction
- Accessible: yes

Other information
- Station code: 4372
- DS100 code: UND
- IBNR: 8010242
- Category: 4
- Fare zone: VMT
- Website: www.bahnhof.de

History
- Opened: 24 June 1847; 179 years ago

Services
Preceding station	DB Regio Südost	Following station
Gotha towards Göttingen	RE 1	Erfurt Hbf towards Glauchau (Sachs)
Erfurt Hbf Terminus	RE 7	Arnstadt Hbf towards Würzburg Hbf
Preceding station	Abellio Rail Mitteldeutschland	Following station
Wandersleben towards Eisenach	RB 20	Erfurt-Bischleben towards Leipzig Hbf
Preceding station		Following station
Erfurt-Bischleben towards Erfurt Hbf	RB 23	Sülzenbrücken towards Saalfeld (Saale)
Preceding station		Following station
Arnstadt Hbf towards Ilmenau	RE 45	Erfurt Hbf Terminus
Arnstadt Hbf towards Meiningen	RE 50	Erfurt Hbf Terminus
Arnstadt Hbf towards Meiningen	RB 44	Erfurt Hbf Terminus
Sülzenbrücken towards Ilmenau	RB 46	Erfurt-Bischleben towards Erfurt Hbf
Location
- Location within Thuringia Location within Germany Location within Europe

Neudietendorf (German: Bahnhof Neudietendorf) is a railway station in the town of Neudietendorf, Thuringia, Germany. The station lies on the Halle-Bebra railway and Neudietendorf-Schweinfurt railway and the train services are operated by Deutsche Bahn, Süd-Thüringen-Bahn and Erfurter Bahn.

== Train services ==
The station is served by the following service(s):

- regional express (RE 1) Göttingen - Erfurt - Jena - Gera - Zwickau

Service	Train Type	Route	Material	Frequency
RE	DB Regional Express	Neudietendorf - Erfurt Hbf - Weimar - Jena West - Jena-Göschwitz - Stadtroda - Hermsdorf-Klosterlausnitz - Gera Hbf - Gera Süd - Ronneburg (Thür) - Nobdenitz - Schmölln (Thür) - Lehndorf (Altenburg) - Altenburg		Every 2 hours
RE7 Mainfranken-Thüringen-Express	DB Regional Express	Erfurt Hbf - Neudietendorf - Arnstadt Hbf - Suhl - Bad Neustadt - Schweinfurt Hbf - Würzburg Hbf	Class 612	Every 2 hours
RB20	DB	Eisenach - Wutha - Schönau - Sättelstädt - Mechterstädt - Fröttstädt - Gotha - Seebergen - Wandersleben - Neudietendorf - Erfurt-Bischleben - Erfurt Hbf - Vieselbach - Hopfgarten (Weimar) - Weimar - Oßmannstedt - Apolda - Niedertrebra - Bad Sulza - Großheringen - Bad Kösen - Naumburg (Saale) Hbf - Leißling - Weißenfels - Großkorbetha - Leuna Werke Süd - Leuna Werke Nord - Merseburg - Schkopau - Halle-Ammendorf - Halle (Saale) Hbf	Class 143	1x per hour
RB23	DB	Erfurt Hbf - Neudietendorf - Arnstadt Hbf - Stadtilm - Rottenbach - Bad Blankenburg - Saalfeld (Saale)		Every 2 hours
RB (STB4)	Süd-Thüringer-Bahn	Erfurt Hbf - Neudietendorf - Arnstadt Hbf - Plaue (Thür) - Oberhof (Thür) - Zella-Mehlis - Suhl - Grimmenthal - Meiningen	Class 450	Every 2 hours
RB (EB3)	Erfurter Bahn	Erfurt Hbf - Neudietendorf - Arnstadt Hbf - Plaue (Thür) - Geraberg - Ilmenau	Class 450	1x per hour

== Bus services ==
- Erfurt - Neudietendorf - Wandersleben - Seebergen - Gotha
