= Grimmenthal station =

Railway station in Obermaßfeld-Grimmenthal, Germany

Grimmenthal
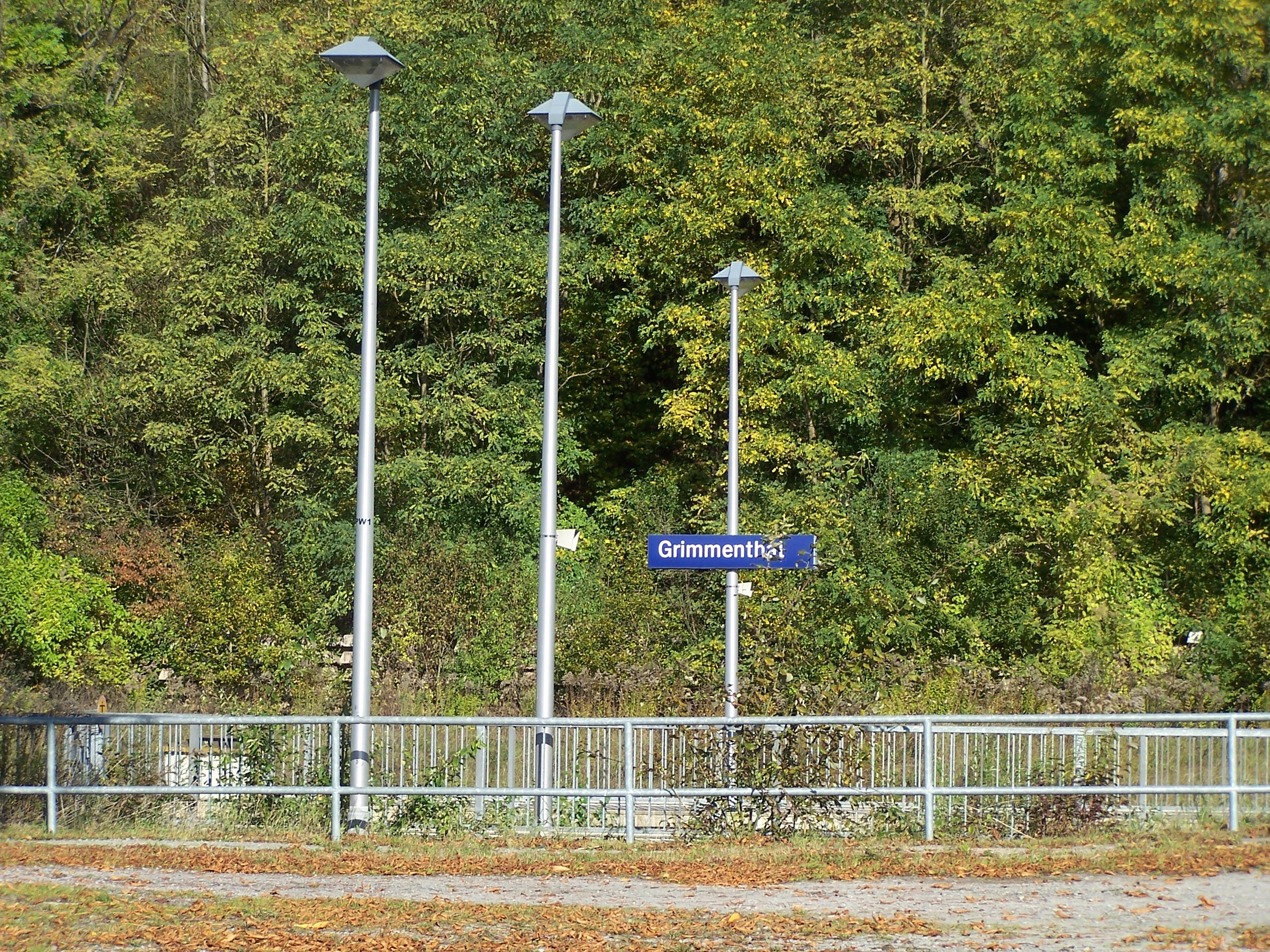
- 2017

General information
- Location: Am Bahnhof 78; 98617 Grimmenthal; Thuringia; Germany
- Coordinates: 50.5329°N 10.4509°E
- System: Bf
- Owner: DB Netz
- Operator: DB Station&Service
- Lines: Neudietendorf–Ritschenhausen railway (KBS 570); Eisenach–Lichtenfels railway (KBS 569)
- Platforms: 4 side platforms
- Tracks: 5
- Train operators: DB Regio Südost; Süd-Thüringen-Bahn

Construction
- Parking: yes
- Accessible: no

Other information
- Station code: 2278
- DS100 code: UGM
- IBNR: 8010142
- Category: 6
- Website: www.bahnhof.de

History
- Opened: 1 November 1858; 167 years ago

Services
Preceding station	DB Regio Südost	Following station
Suhl towards Erfurt Hbf	RE 7	Mellrichstadt Bahnhof towards Würzburg Hbf
Preceding station		Following station
Untermaßfeld towards Eisenach	RB 41	Vachdorf towards Neuhaus am Rennweg
Untermaßfeld towards Meiningen	RB 44	Rohr (Thür) towards Erfurt Hbf
Meiningen Terminus	RE 50	Suhl towards Erfurt Hbf
Preceding station		Following station
Untermaßfeld towards Meiningen	RB 40	Wölfertshausen towards Schweinfurt Stadt
Location
- Location within Thuringia Location within Germany Location within Europe

Grimmenthal station is a railway station in Grimmenthal, Thuringia, Germany.
