= Werra Railway =

Werra Railway may refer to:

- Werra Railway Company, a former railway company in Germany
- Eisenach–Lichtenfels railway, Werra Railway Company's trunk line along Werra river
