= Erfurt-Bischleben station =

Railway station in Erfurt, Germany

Erfurt-Bischleben
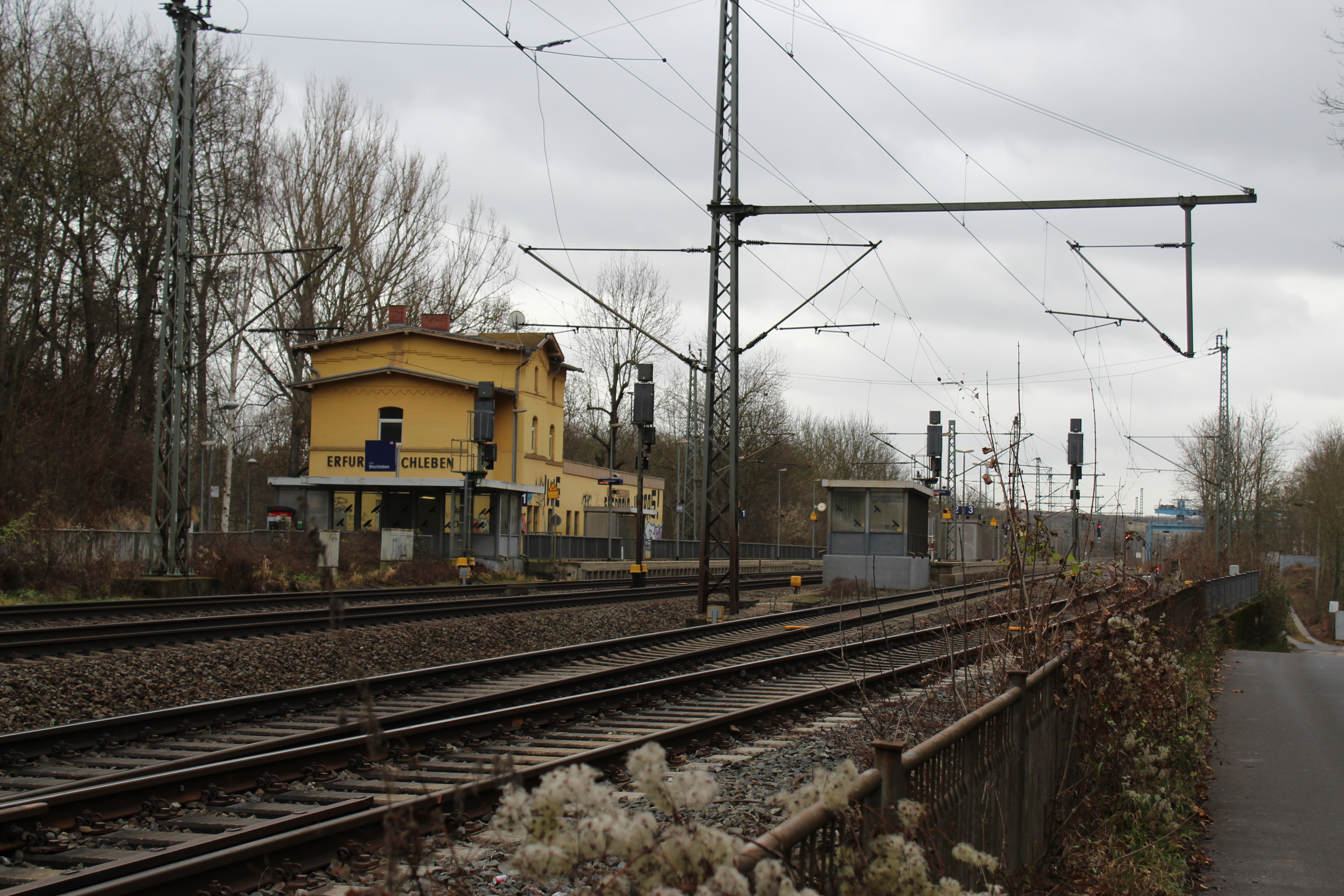
- 2018

General information
- Location: Uferstraße/Bahnweg; 99094 Erfurt; Thuringia; Germany
- Coordinates: 50.9342°N 10.9886°E
- System: Bf
- Owner: Deutsche Bahn
- Operator: DB Station&Service
- Lines: Halle–Bebra railway (KBS 605)
- Platforms: 1 island platform 1 side platform
- Tracks: 4
- Train operators: Abellio Rail Mitteldeutschland; Erfurter Bahn; Süd-Thüringen-Bahn

Construction
- Accessible: partly

Other information
- Station code: 1637
- DS100 code: UEBI
- IBNR: 8011502
- Category: 5
- Fare zone: VMT
- Website: www.bahnhof.de

History
- Opened: 24 June 1847; 179 years ago

Services
Preceding station	Abellio Rail Mitteldeutschland	Following station
Neudietendorf towards Eisenach	RB 20	Erfurt Hbf towards Leipzig Hbf
Preceding station		Following station
Erfurt Hbf Terminus	RB 23	Neudietendorf towards Saalfeld (Saale)
Preceding station		Following station
Neudietendorf towards Ilmenau	RB 46	Erfurt Hbf Terminus
Location
- Location within Thuringia Location within Germany Location within Europe

Erfurt-Bischleben station is a railway station in the Bischleben district of Erfurt, Thuringia, Germany.
