= Eisfeld station =

Railway station in Germany

Eisfeld

General information
- Location: Am Bahnhof 1; 98673 Eisfeld; Thuringia; Germany
- Coordinates: 50.4179°N 10.9047°E
- Elevation: 428 m (1,404 ft)
- System: Bf
- Owner: DB Netz
- Operator: DB Station&Service
- Lines: Eisenach–Lichtenfels railway (KBS 569); Eisfeld–Sonneberg railway (KBS 569); Eisfeld–Schönbrunn railway
- Platforms: 1 island platform 1 side platform
- Tracks: 3
- Train operators: Süd-Thüringen-Bahn

Construction
- Parking: yes
- Cycle facilities: yes
- Accessible: partly

Other information
- Station code: 1538
- DS100 code: UED
- IBNR: 8011472
- Category: 6
- Website: www.bahnhof.de

History
- Opened: 1 November 1858; 167 years ago

Services
Preceding station		Following station
Harras (Thür) towards Eisenach	RB 41	Bachfeld towards Neuhaus am Rennweg
Location
- Location within Thuringia Location within Germany Location within Europe

Eisfeld station is a railway station in Eisfeld, Thuringia, Germany.
