= Ritschenhausen station =

Railway station in Germany

Ritschenhausen
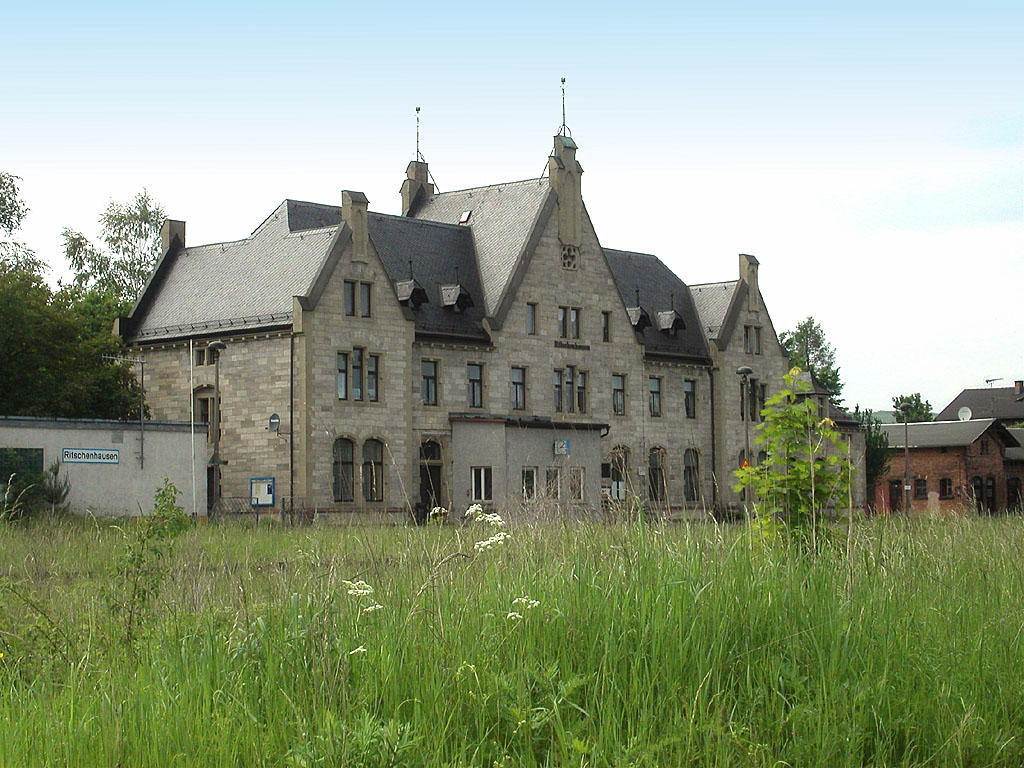
- 2003

General information
- Location: Bahnhofstraße 70; 98617 Ritschenhausen; Thuringia, Germany
- Coordinates: 50.5128°N 10.4293°E
- Elevation: 314.61 m (1,032.2 ft)
- Owner: DB Netz
- Operator: DB Station&Service
- Lines: Neudietendorf–Ritschenhausen (KBS 570); Schweinfurt–Meiningen (KBS 815)
- Platforms: 1 side platform
- Tracks: 2
- Train operators: Erfurter Bahn

Other information
- Station code: 5292
- DS100 code: URI
- IBNR: 8012770
- Category: 6
- Website: www.bahnhof.de

History
- Opened: 1874; 152 years ago

Services
Preceding station		Following station
Wölfershausen towards Schweinfurt Stadt	RB 40	Meiningen Terminus
Location
- Location within Thuringia

Ritschenhausen station is a railway station situated in the Thuringian village of Ritschenhausen on the Neudietendorf–Ritschenhausen and the Schweinfurt–Meiningen lines. The station is a former border station between the Bavarian and the Prussian state railways.
