= Meiningen station =

Railway station in Germany

Meiningen
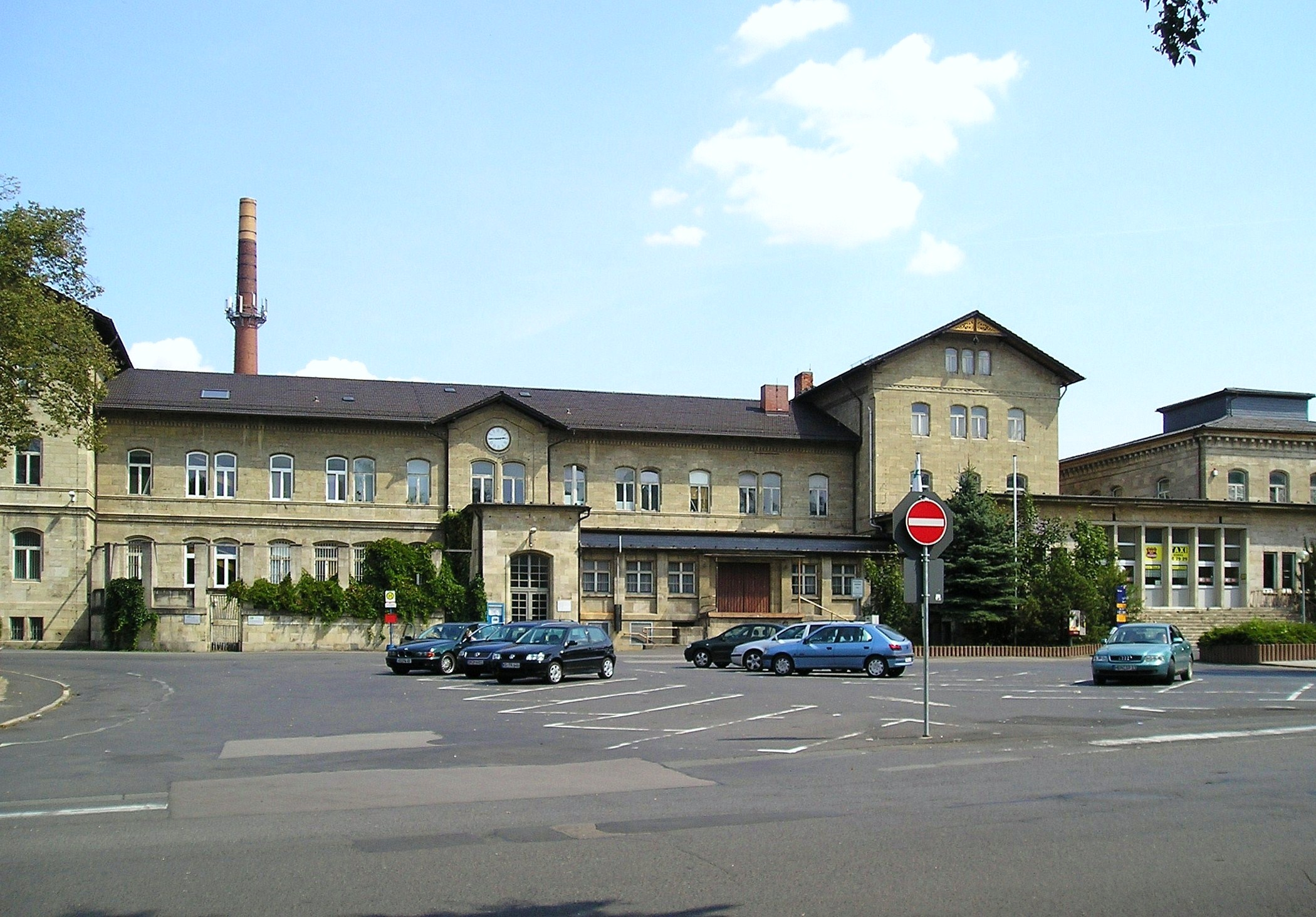
- Entrance buildings: Prussian station on left – Bavarian on right

General information
- Location: Lindenallee 1, Meiningen, Thuringia; Germany
- Coordinates: 50°34′27″N 10°25′15″E
- Lines: Meiningen–Sonneberg (KBS 569); Meiningen–Erfurt (KBS 570); Meiningen–Eisenach (KBS 575); Meiningen–Schweinfurt (KBS 815)
- Platforms: 4

Construction
- Accessible: Yes
- Architectural style: Neoclassical

Other information
- Station code: 4033
- DS100 code: UM, KKHRW
- IBNR: 8010230
- Category: 4
- Website: www.bahnhof.de

History
- Opened: 2 November 1858 – Prussian part; 15 December 1874 – Bavarian part

Services
| Preceding station | | Following station |
|---|---|---|
| Terminus | RB 40 | Ritschenhausen towards Schweinfurt Stadt |
| Preceding station | | Following station |
| Terminus | RE 50 | Grimmenthal towards Erfurt Hbf |
| Walldorf (Werra) towards Eisenach | RB 41 | Untermaßfeld towards Neuhaus am Rennweg |
| Terminus | RB 44 | Grimmenthal towards Erfurt Hbf |
Location
- Location within Thuringia Location within Germany Location within Europe

Meiningen station is a junction of four railways and with its facilities is one of the most important railway stations in southern Thuringia, Germany.

It consists of two once separate stations, the former Prussian station as a through station on the Werra Railway and the Bavarian station as a terminal station on the Schweinfurt–Meiningen line.

== Location ==
Meininger station is located at the 60.69 km mark of the Werra Railway (from Eisenach) and at the 77.90 km mark of the Schweinfurt–Meiningen line (from Schweinfurt). The station is located on the eastern edge of the city of Meiningen next to the English Garden and separates the city centre from the Eastside district. The old town and many public facilities such as the Meiningen Theatre, Schloss Elisabethenburg (castle), hotels and the law courts are located nearby.

== History ==
The plan for the construction of a railway station in Meiningen was developed as early as 1838, as part of the first project for a railway line through the Werra valley. The site for the railway tracks was originally in the northwest of the town at the foot of the Herrenberge mountain, but this project fell through. 20 years later after a construction period of two years the station was inaugurated on 2 November 1858 at its present location with the opening of the Werra Railway. The station was the seat of the Werra Railway Company (German: Werra Eisenbahngesellschaft), which had received the concession for the construction and operation of the Werra Railway. At its opening, the station already consisted of the station building and six other buildings, including a locomotive depot with a repair shop and coke, carriage and freight sheds. To meet the ever-increasing need for maintenance and repair work storage sidings were built on the Werra line. In 1863 a rail depot was built with a roundhouse and a turntable opposite the entrance building, requiring the locomotive shed to be partly demolished.

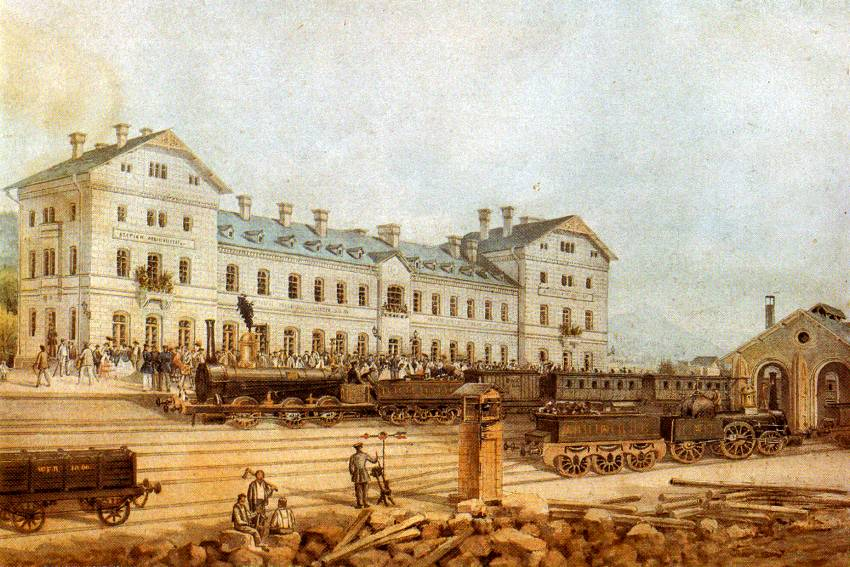
Entrance building and train shed, 1859

On 15 December 1874 the Royal Bavarian State Railways, put the Schweinfurt–Meiningen line into operation. It built south of the existing Werra Railway station a separate "Bavarian" station (Bayerischen Bahnhof) as a terminus, with entrance building, platforms, a locomotive depot with five stalls, a turntable and other tracks. The two sections of the station were connected by two sets of points only. This nearly doubled the railway premises, which extended now for over 1,300 metres between the two connecting tracks at each end. As the number of tracks at the crossing of the Marienstraße increased from two to ten, controlling traffic with barriers was no longer considered reasonable. So a 100 metre long tunnel was built, crossing under the railway tracks and platforms, connecting the city centre and the Oststadt district with one another. The construction of the Bavarian station and the tunnel made it necessary to lower Marienstraße and the connecting road network and to carry out large changes in the wider environment of the station. So the street network to the east of the railway property had to be rearranged and the road to Rohr was rebuilt on a new alignment.

With the opening of the Neudietendorf–Ritschenhausen railway in 1884, the station was on a long-distance route connecting Berlin with Stuttgart via Erfurt and Würzburg. In 1895, the Prussian state railways acquired the Werra Railway and its railway facilities became the "Prussian" station (Preußischen Bahnhof). By 1900, a one-storey building wing, a new station hall with a staircase and a loading ramp were built between the Prussian and Bavarian buildings. The adjoining workshop has developed by 1900 into a connected building complex, 200 metres long, with 26 locomotive stalls and a number of workshops and other facilities. As the capacities of the main workshop soon reached their limits, in 1914 the Prussian state railway built a new main workshop, one km north of the station, later called "RAW Meiningen" and now operating as Meiningen Steam Locomotive Works. The old main workshop was dismantled and converted back into a train depot. In the following years all platforms were extended and provided with canopies except for platform 2.

After the formation of the Deutsche Reichsbahn, the whole station became part of the Railway Administration of Erfurt (Reichsbahndirektion Erfurt). The depot was enlarged and given a larger turntable. In the southern part of the railway property a storage tank was built for the supply of fuel to petrol stations. In the Second World War the station was damaged in an American air attack during Operation Clarion, including the destruction of the southern railway tracks, a road bridge over them, signal box 4 and the tank farm. After the war, in July 1945, the line to Schweinfurt was closed at the Inner German border. On this line, trains ran only as far as Rentwertshausen and Römhild. The locomotive depot of the former Bavarian state railway was rebuilt as a coal yard. The Soviet Army built a loading ramp for heavy military equipment between the freight depot and the engine depot.

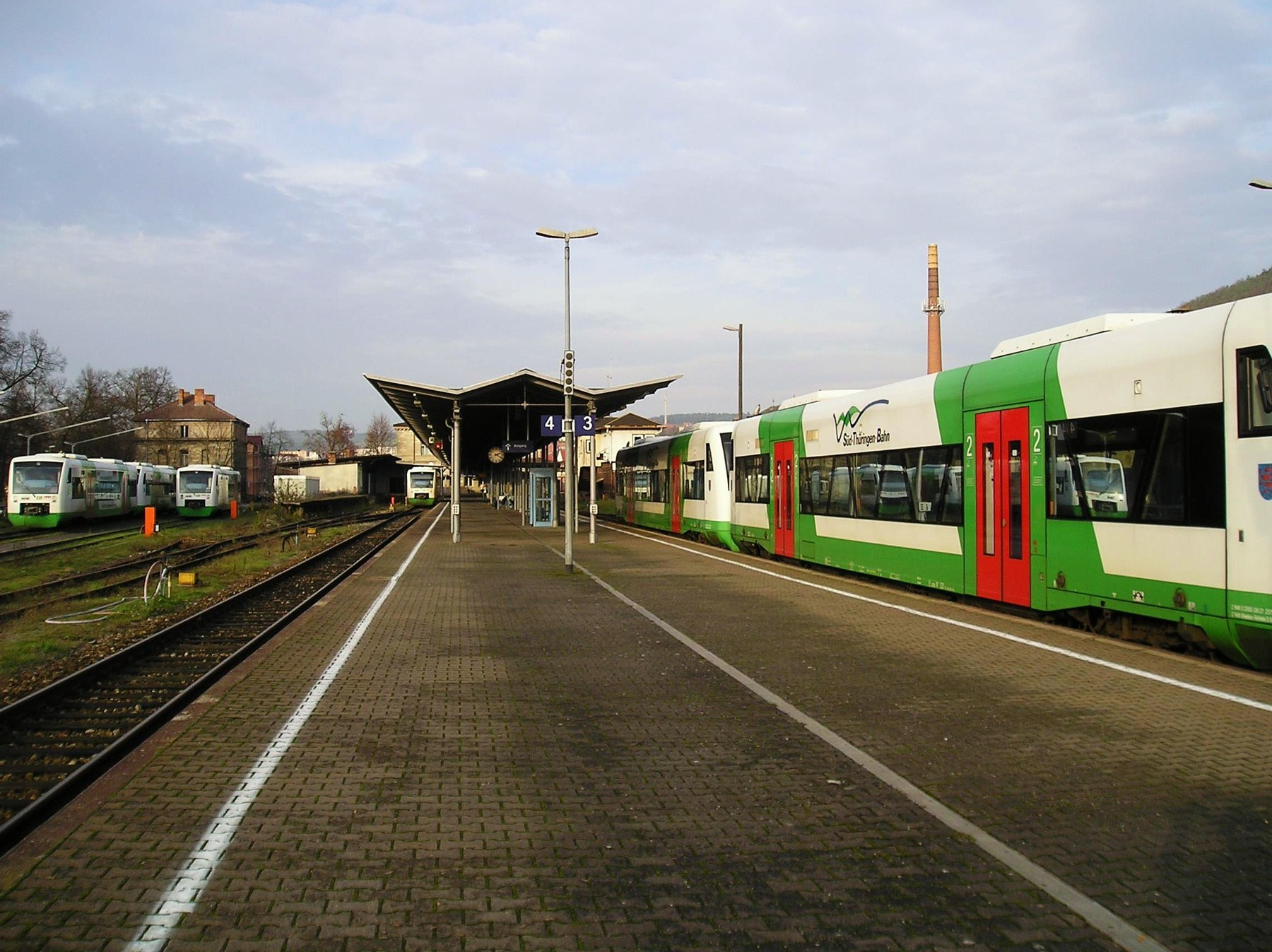
Platform on the Bavarian station

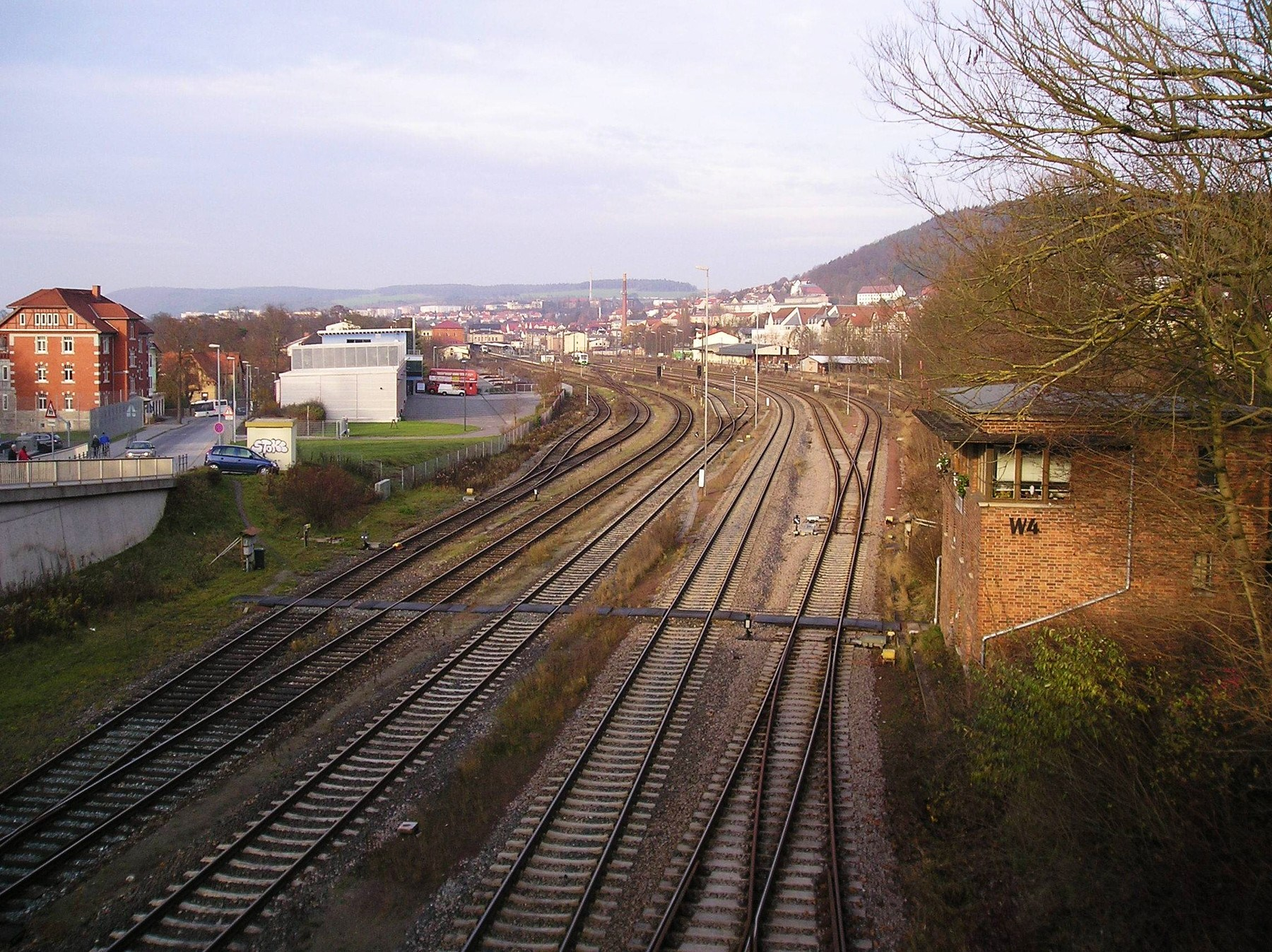
Southern railway yard

In 1960, the last major renovation of the passenger station was carried out. In place of the old station hall, a new hall was built with ticket counters, baggage lockers, Mitropa, newspaper shop, kiosk, toilets and later an Intershop. A grand staircase now led to the station forecourt.

After the construction of the Inner German border, East German railways developed new long-distance services in East Germany. Meiningen station was now the start and end point for express and semi-fast trains to Erfurt, Halle, Leipzig, Berlin, Dresden–Görlitz and Stralsund–Barth (Ostsee). Railway traffic and passenger number increased greatly from 1960 to 1989. The daily number of trains increased to more than 200 trains.

Diesel locomotives were stationed at the depot from 1967. Around 1970, the Städteschnellverkehr ("city rapid") service to Berlin was abandoned. From 25 October 1976 the Städteexpress ("city express") service Rennsteig ran between Berlin and Meiningen. The relatively small station was now congested and often two trains departed simultaneously from a platform. In 1980 a new roundhouse with 12 locomotive stalls and a turntable was inaugurated at the railway depot. Furthermore, a new carriage washing facility was opened in the Bavarian part of the station.

After German reunification in 1990 and the reopening of the Meiningen–Schweinfurt line in 1991, the first new express services were established from Berlin via Meiningen to Würzburg or Schweinfurt. After the closure of these services by Deutsche Bahn at the end of the 1990s, Meiningen station increasingly lost its importance. The city built a new bus station in 1998 adjacent to the railway land near platforms 1 and 2, offering travellers good connections between buses and trains. The tank farm and the coal yard at the locomotive depot of the Bavarian station were demolished. The Meiningen base fire station was built in their place.

In 2001 Deutsche Bahn transferred regional rail services in the southern Thuringia area to Süd-Thüringen-Bahn (STB), founded in 1999. Its new rail routes and operations were based in Meiningen station. STB took over the depot in the same year and has used it since then as a maintenance facility and business headquarters. Since 2004, Erfurter Bahn (EB) has operated the Unterfranken-Shuttle, a new direct rail link between Meiningen and Schweinfurt. The Unterfranken-Shuttle (RB 40) uses the tracks and platforms of the Bavarian station as well as the Meininger station as the location of its business operations. The Bavarian section of the station is also used for parking Deutsche Bahn Regional-Express trains. On the 150th anniversary of the Werra Railway on 2 November 2008, a memorial plaque was attached to the station building.

== The station ==
=== Entrance building ===
The station building is a neoclassical building and consists of two parts. The larger northern building was opened in 1858 for the Werra Railway and was taken over by the Prussian state railway in 1895. The southern building was built by the Royal Bavarian State Railways in 1874 with the opening of the Schweinfurt–Meiningen line. In 1900, the two buildings were joined with a single-storey low-rise building, which includes the station concourse and its service facilities. The entrance building contains the following customer facilities: travel agency/ticketing, ticket machines, bakery and snack bar, waiting area and a games room. The building also accommodates the operations of the Süd-Thüringen-Bahn and the Erfurter Bahn companies, as well as operations of the Southeastern Regional Area of DB Netze, based in Leipzig. In front of the station building there is an office serving taxi customers and next to it is the Meiningen bus station. In the station forecourt there are parking spaces for cycles and cars.

=== Tracks and platforms ===
With a length of 1.3 km, the station area covers an area of ten hectares. It has 41 tracks with a total length of 9,222 m. 13 of these tracks are in the Bavarian part of the station. The longest track is track 2 at 937 m, the shortest is the connecting track V66 at 10 m. The passenger station consists of a through station with platform tracks 1, 1a and 2 and a terminal station with platform tracks 3 and 4. There is barrier-free access to all platforms. The platforms have the following destinations, lengths and heights:

- Platform track 1: Eisenach, Erfurt, Sonneberg, Grimmenthal / length 301 m / height 55 cm.
- Platform track 1a: Erfurt / 90 m / 55 cm.
- Platform track 2: Sonneberg / 315.6 m / 30 cm.
- Platform track 3: Erfurt, Chemnitz, Eisfeld, Sonneberg, Neuhaus a. R. / 343.2 m / 38 cm.
- Platform track 4: Schweinfurt, Bad Kissingen / 343.2 m / 38 cm.

=== Other parts of the station ===
On the east side of the railway property is the former goods yard. A sales outlet and a workshop are now located there. On the west side there is a rail freight unloading yard and the Bavarian part of the station, which is mainly used as a train depot for the Unterfranken-Shuttle, Erfurter Bahn and Deutsche Bahn Regional-Expresses. For the ease of operations there are three signal boxes, a fourth has been closed. Opposite the entrance building is the Meiningen depot. It is used for the permanent establishment of the Süd-Thüringen-Bahn. Furthermore, a Federal Police station is established in the Bavarian station, which was in a very poor condition in 2009. From January 2010, the DB reconstructed the platforms and shelters, but not the entrance building.

== Passenger operations ==
Meiningen station has direct Regional-Express (RE) and Regionalbahn (RB) connections on four lines to the following places as of 2025:

| KBS | Line | Direction | Operator | Interval | Connections at destination |
|---|---|---|---|---|---|
| 570 | RE 50 | Erfurt | Süd-Thüringen-Bahn | six trains a day | ICE 11 Leipzig–Frankfurt/Main; ICE 50 Wiesbaden–Dresden |
| 570 | RB 44 | Erfurt | Süd-Thüringen-Bahn | every 2 hours | ICE 11 Leipzig–Frankfurt/Main; ICE 50 Wiesbaden–Dresden |
| 570 | RB 44 | Grimmenthal | Süd-Thüringen-Bahn | every 2 hours | RE 7 Erfurt–Würzburg |
| 569 | RB 41 | Eisfeld; Sonneberg; Neuhaus am Rennweg | Süd-Thüringen-Bahn | hourly | RE 19 Sonneberg–Nuremberg |
| 575 | RB 41 | Eisenach | Süd-Thüringen-Bahn | hourly | ICE 11 Leipzig–Frankfurt/Main; ICE 50 Wiesbaden–Dresden |
| 815 | RB 40 | Schweinfurt | Erfurter Bahn | every 2 hours | RE 20 Würzburg–Hof; RE 54 Würzburg–Bamberg |
