= Suhl station =

Railway station in Suhl, Germany

Suhl
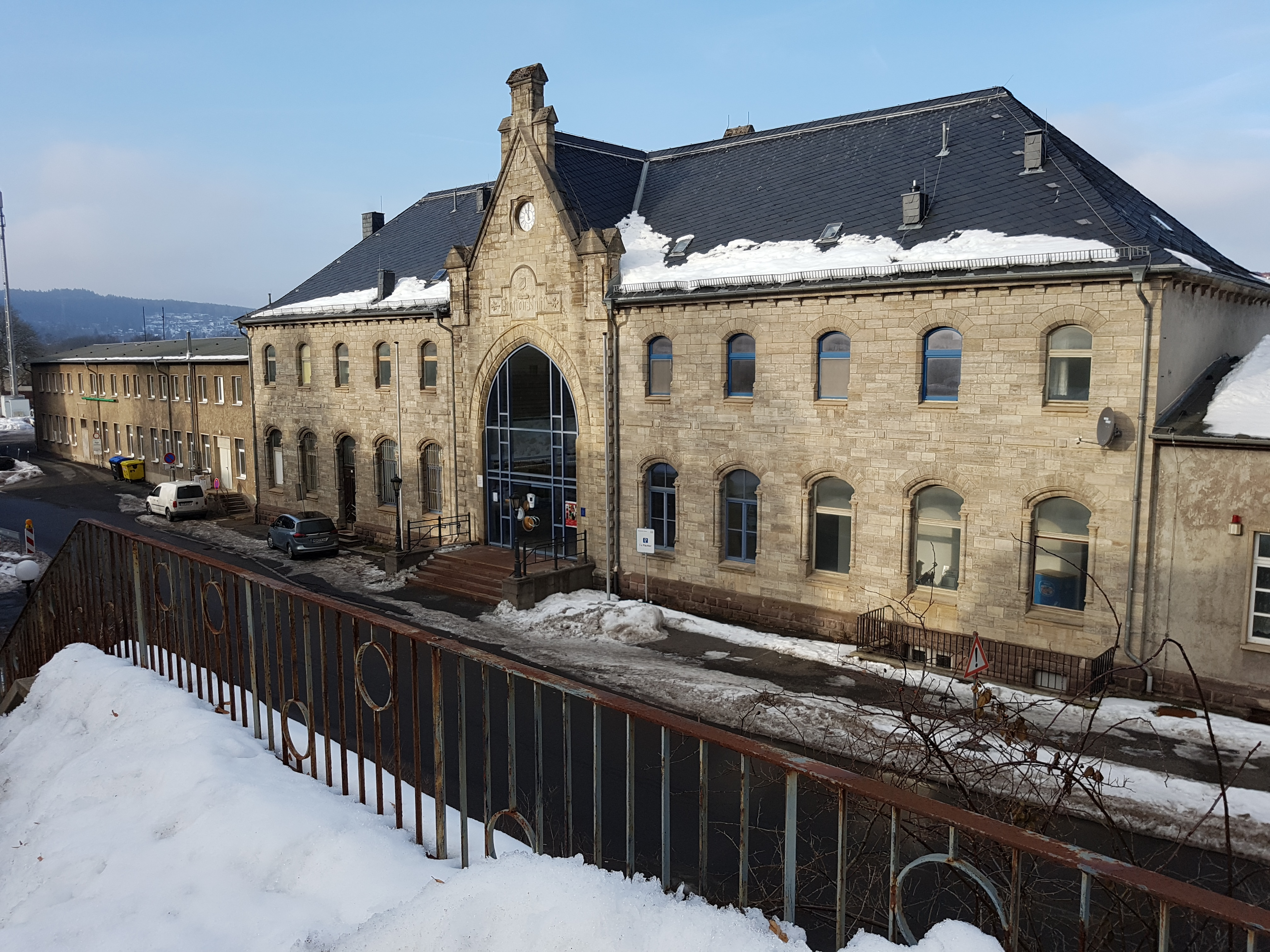
- 2017

General information
- Location: Bahnhofstraße 28; 98527 Suhl; Thuringia; Germany
- Coordinates: 50.6052°N 10.6830°E
- Elevation: 426 m (1,398 ft)
- System: Bf
- Owner: Deutsche Bahn
- Operator: DB Netz; DB Station&Service
- Lines: Neudietendorf–Ritschenhausen railway (KBS 570); Suhl–Schleusingen railway (KBS 568)
- Platforms: 2 side platforms
- Tracks: 2
- Train operators: DB Regio Südost; Süd-Thüringen-Bahn

Construction
- Accessible: yes

Other information
- Station code: 6099
- DS100 code: USL
- IBNR: 8010345
- Category: 5
- Website: www.bahnhof.de

History
- Opened: 20 December 1882; 143 years ago

Services
Preceding station	DB Regio Südost	Following station
Zella-Mehlis towards Erfurt Hbf	RE 7	Grimmenthal towards Würzburg Hbf
Preceding station		Following station
Grimmenthal towards Meiningen	RE 50	Zella-Mehlis towards Erfurt Hbf
Zella-Mehlis towards Wernshausen	RB 43 selected trains only	Terminus
Suhl-Heinrichs towards Meiningen	RB 44	Zella-Mehlis towards Erfurt Hbf
Location
- Location within Thuringia Location within Germany Location within Europe

Suhl station is a railway station in Suhl, Thuringia, Germany.
