= DB Netze =

Logo of DB Netze

DB Netze (German pronunciation: [deːbeː ˈnɛtsə], "DB Networks") is a brand of the German national rail holding company Deutsche Bahn (DB). It was formed in December 2007 along with DB Schenker, the logistic department, and DB Bahn, the passenger services arm.

== Overview ==
The original intent was that DB Netze would coordinate the delivery of infrastructure and operations in order to provide long-term transport systems. As a subsidiary of DB, it was to develop and operate a comprehensive range of transport, energy, data and service networks. In June 2008, however, in light of the planned partial privatisation of services, the DB's management board decided to break out the service providers from the DB Netze brand and only leave it with the infrastructure elements. The service providers are now brigaded within the DB Dienstleistungen business area under the DB brand.

Today DB Netze comprises the following business areas:

- DB Netze Fahrweg
- DB Netze Personenbahnhöfe
- DB Netze Energie
- DB Netze Projektbau

Its former fifth division, DB Station&Service, which was merged into DB InfraGO, ran about 5,400 stations with 2,400 buildings. It delivers services to passengers, hires station real estate, and markets station stops even for other railway companies. DB Energie procures electricity and diesel for engines and stationary users across the entire DB concern. Its customers also include other companies.
