= Eisenach–Lichtenfels railway =

Railway line in central Germany

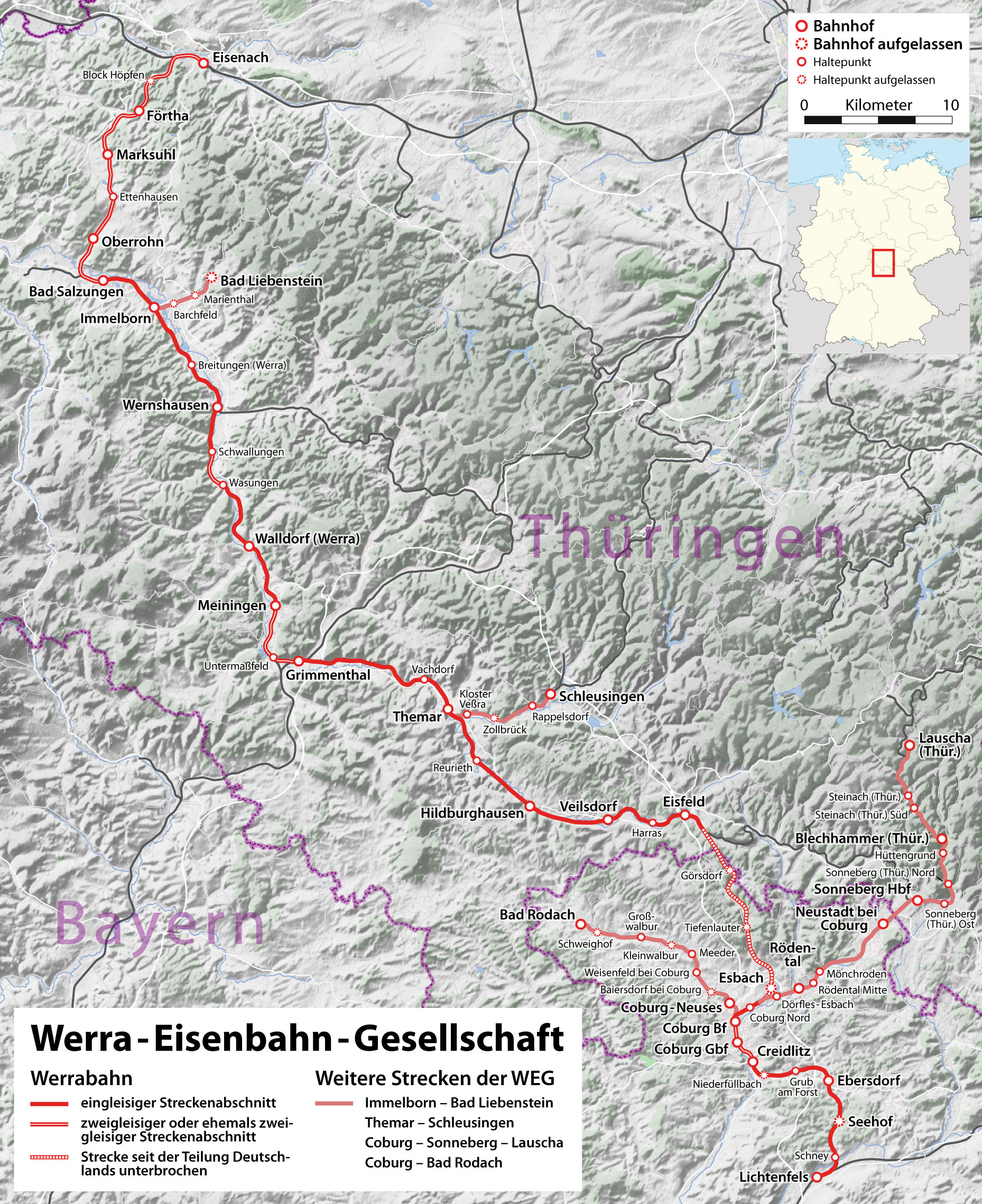

Overview
- Native name: Werrabahn
- Line number: 6311
- Locale: Thuringia and Bavaria, Germany

Service
- Route number: 575, 569, 820

Technical
- Line length: 151 km (94 mi)
- Track gauge: 1,435 mm (4 ft 8 1/2 in) standard gauge

The Eisenach–Lichtenfels railway (or Werrabahn, 'Werra Railway') is a single-tracked main line with a standard gauge of 1,435 mm (4 ft 8 1/2 in) in Thuringia and Bavaria in southern and central Germany, that runs mostly along the river Werra. It runs from Eisenach via Meiningen to Eisfeld and, formerly, continued to Coburg and Lichtenfels. It was opened in 1858 and is one of the oldest railways in Germany. The railway company that built it, the Werra Eisenbahngesellschaft with its headquarters in Meiningen was also often called the Werrabahn. The company also ran various lines branching off the Werra Railway.

== History ==
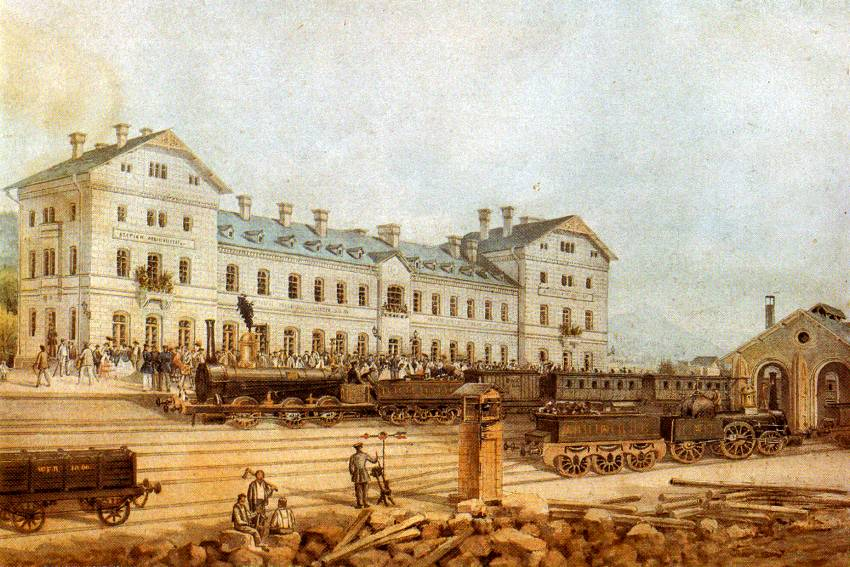
Meiningen station in 1859

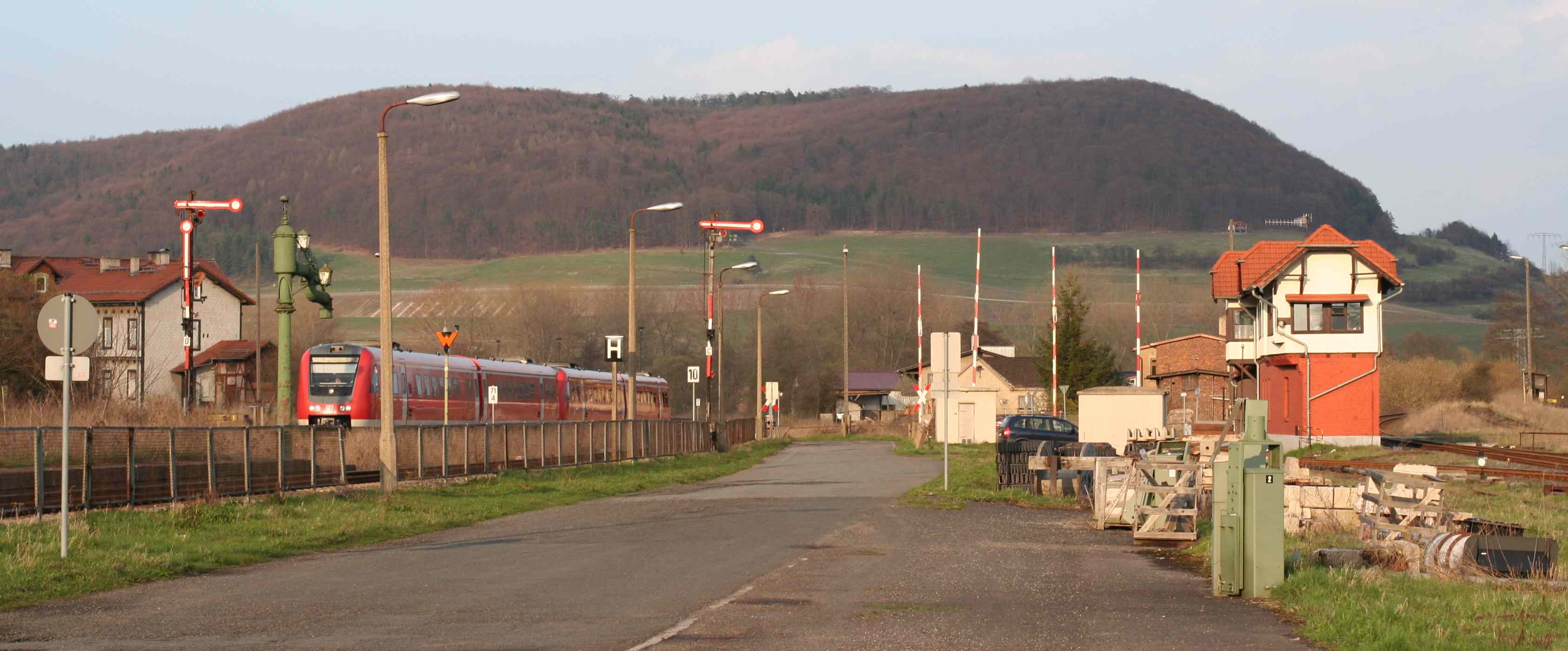
Grimmenthal station, Go signal box

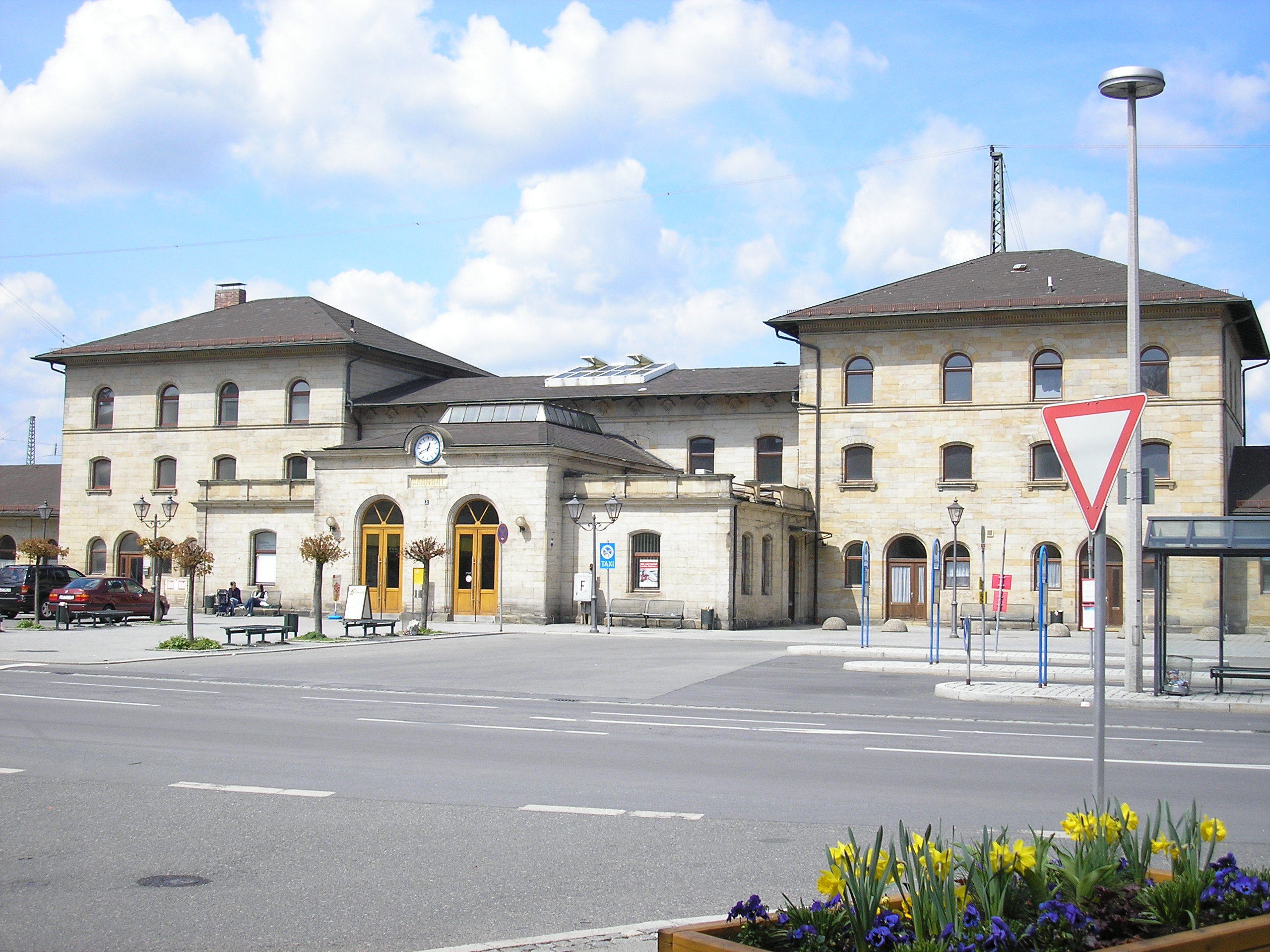
Lichtenfels station

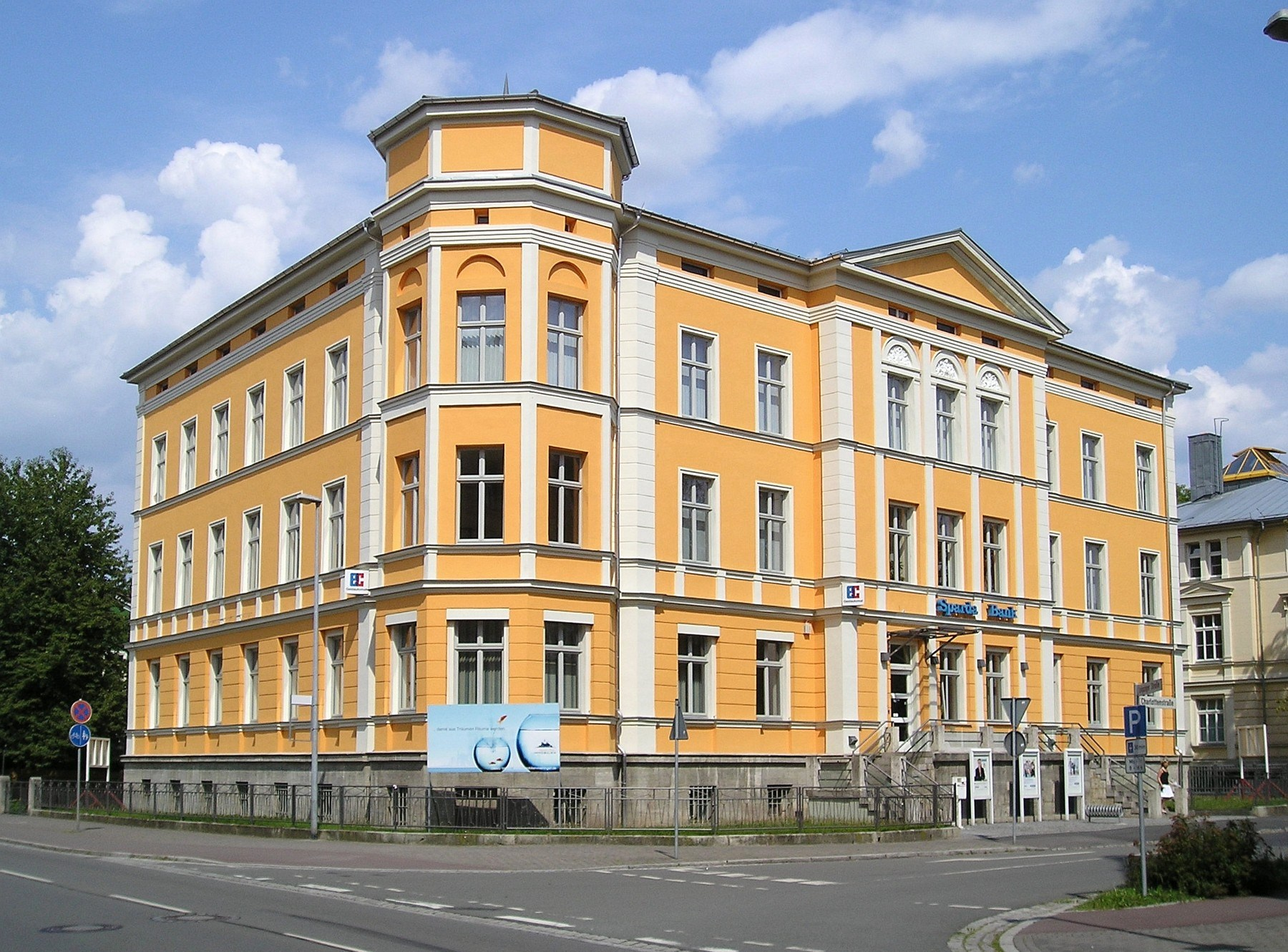
Former seat of the Werra Railway Company in Meiningen today

In 1841 the Grand Duchy of Saxe-Weimar-Eisenach and the duchies of Saxe-Coburg and Gotha and Saxe-Meiningen signed a treaty to establish a railway from Eisenach to Coburg. In 1845 an agreement was made with the Kingdom of Bavaria to connect the Werra Railway to the Ludwig South-North Railway in Lichtenfels and finally in 1855 the newly formed Werra Railway Company (Werra-Eisenbahn-Gesellschaft) received a concession to build and operate the line.

On 18 February 1856 a groundbreaking ceremony was celebrated in Grimmelshausen near Themar. On 1 November 1858 the whole line was formally opened between Eisenach and Coburg with a length of 130.1 km. There were 17 signal boxes, 10 roundhouses, a depot, 22 houses for railway officials, 128 gatekeepers’ houses, 179 crossings, 63 underpasses or overpasses, 31 bridges and a tunnel at Förtha. In June 1858, 8,470 workers were involved in the construction.

Regular services began on 2 November 1858 with 24 locomotives and 367 wagons. The remaining 30 km of the line to Lichtenfels was put into operation in January 1859. All construction works had been designed from the outset for two-track service. Several sections were duplicated by 1910: the line through the Thuringian Forest from Eisenach to Bad Salzungen (26.7 km), between Schwallungen and Wasungen (3.5 km), between Meiningen and Grimmenthal (7.1 km) and between Coburg and Creidlitz (4.6 km).

All assets of the Werra Railway Company were acquired by the Prussian state on 1 October 1895 for 25 million marks. The line was administered by the railway administration of the Deutsche Reichsbahn in Erfurt until 1945.

On 8 April 1945, bridges in Eisfeld were blown up, closing rail operations. The establishment of the border between occupation zones led to the closure of the line between Eisfeld and Görsdorf Station, which is in Bavaria. The line closed on 30 August 1949 due to a dilapidated subway on the section between Görsdorf and Tiefenlauter. Passenger traffic was maintained in Bavaria by a bus service up the Lauter valley to Rottenbach. Freight trains operated to Tiefenlauter until 1 July 1976 but on 6 April 1977 the line was closed and subsequently dismantled. By 1989 land had been sold and partly built on in Lautertal and Dörfles-Esbach, so restoration of the line is not possible.

Electric train services commenced on the Coburg–Lichtenfels section on 5 October 1950. It was one of the first electrification projects in Germany after the war. It was intended to strengthen the relationship between Coburg region and Bavaria, following Coburg's unification with Bavaria in 1920. Electrification was extended on the Coburg–Sonneberg line to Neustadt bei Coburg in 1975 and to Sonneberg in 1991.

Three arches of the bridge over the Main at Schney were blown up on 10 April 1945. In October 1945, a temporary repair was made to the bridge, allowing operations at 20 km/h. At the beginning of 1969 this was replaced by a new bridge, 130 m long.

== Operations ==
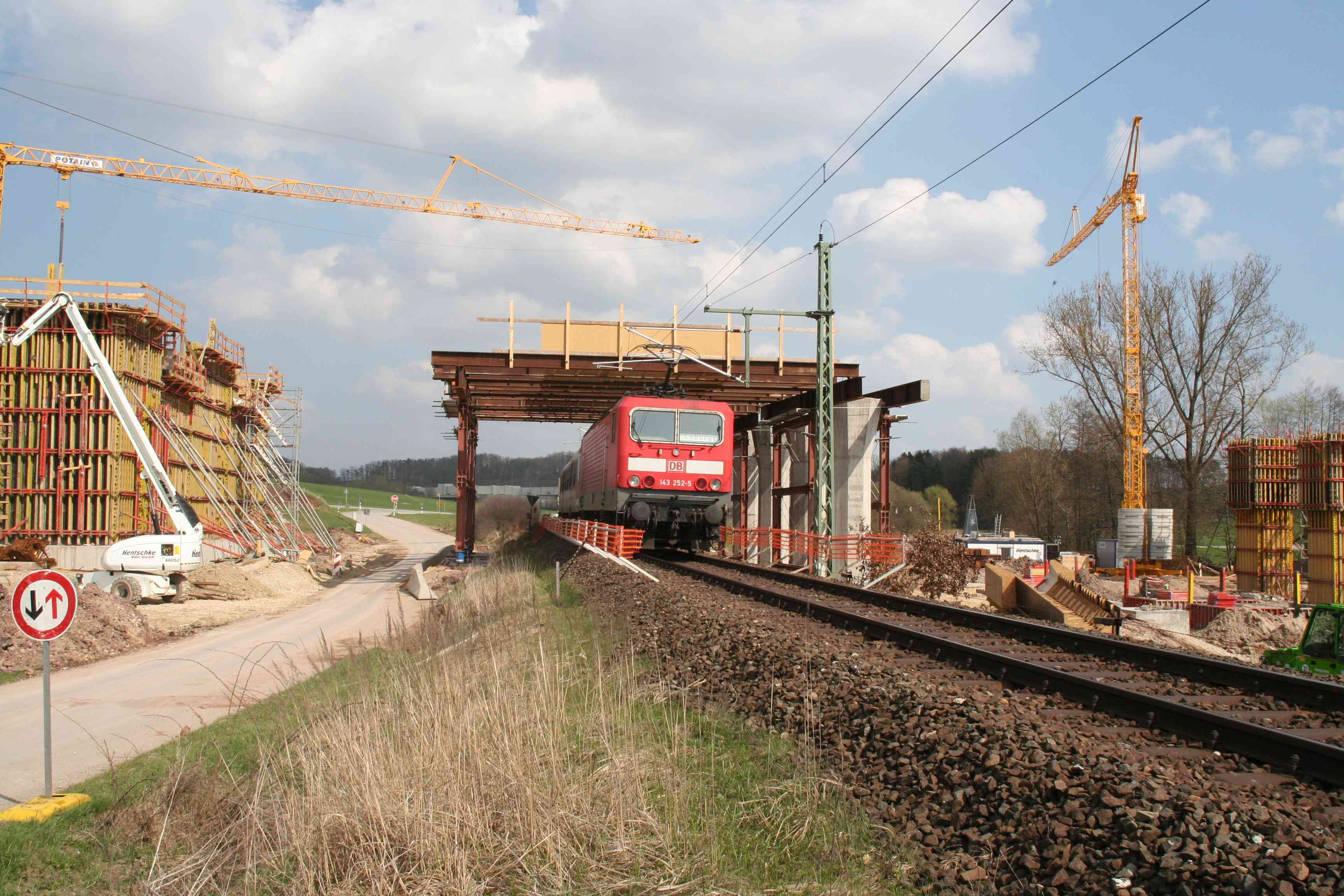
Füllbach Valley viaduct of the A73

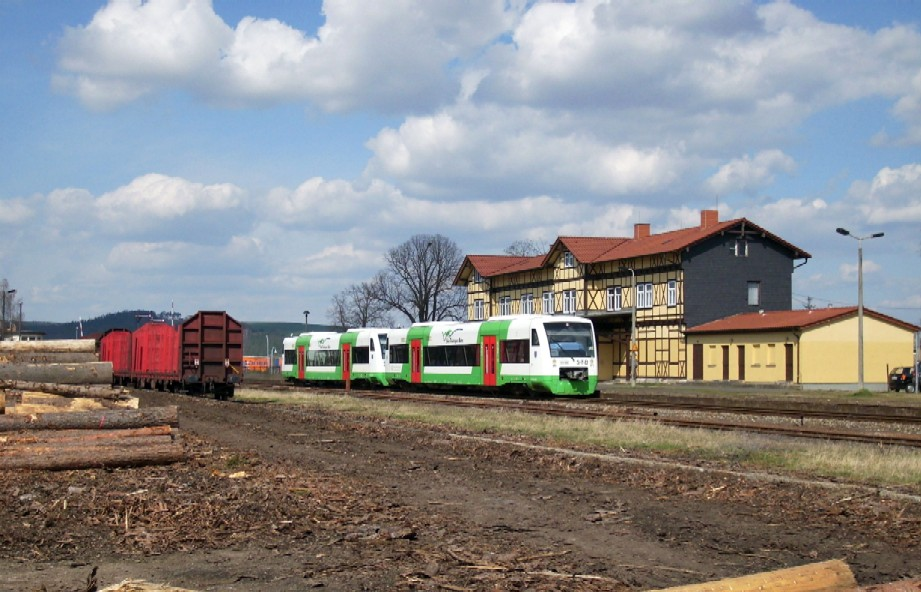
Immelborn station

In 1858 passenger trains took about four hours to cover the 130 km between Eisenach and Coburg. In 1934, express trains from Eger via Bayreuth and Lichtenfels to Eisenach took two hours and ten minutes. In 1939, on weekdays an express train, two semi-fast (Eilzug) trains and five stopping trains operated daily on the line, each way.

In the years following the Second World War, there were no high-quality passenger trains on the Werra line, with a few exceptions, such as the Bad Liebenstein–Leipzig express train. In the last years of East Germany a daily fast train ran from Bad Salzungen via Eisenach to Zwickau. On another section of the line an express train for construction workers ran on Monday, generally shortly after midnight, from Bad Salzungen via Meiningen and Erfurt to Berlin. Only on the short section between Meiningen and Grimmenthal did fast trains run more often than daily to destinations including Berlin, Leipzig, Halle (Saale), Dresden, Görlitz and Stralsund, alternating between the Werra line via Eisenach and the direct line to Erfurt. Among them was the well-known Städteexpress ("city express"), Rennsteig, that first ran in 1976.

Today, the Sud-Thüringen-Bahn operates hourly diesel multiple units from Eisenach to Eisfeld, taking two hours. In 1990 this trip took two hours and 45 minutes, although in 1934 it took only one hour and 50 minutes for the 108 km route. Between Lichtenfels and Coburg, continuing to Sonneberg, Deutsche Bahn operates services alternately every two-hours as Regional-Express Lichtenfels–Sonneberg and Regional-Express Nuremberg–Sonneberg trains. Furthermore, agilis operates hourly trains between Lichtenfels and Coburg, continuing to Bad Rodach.

There has been pressure to reopen the 17 km long closed section between Eisfeld and Coburg in Upper Franconia, which would require some rerouting because of building on its route. An estimate in early 2009 was that this would cost to €103.4 million. The government of Bavaria regards this estimate as too low, mainly because it does not include electrification.
