= Eisfeld =

- Town
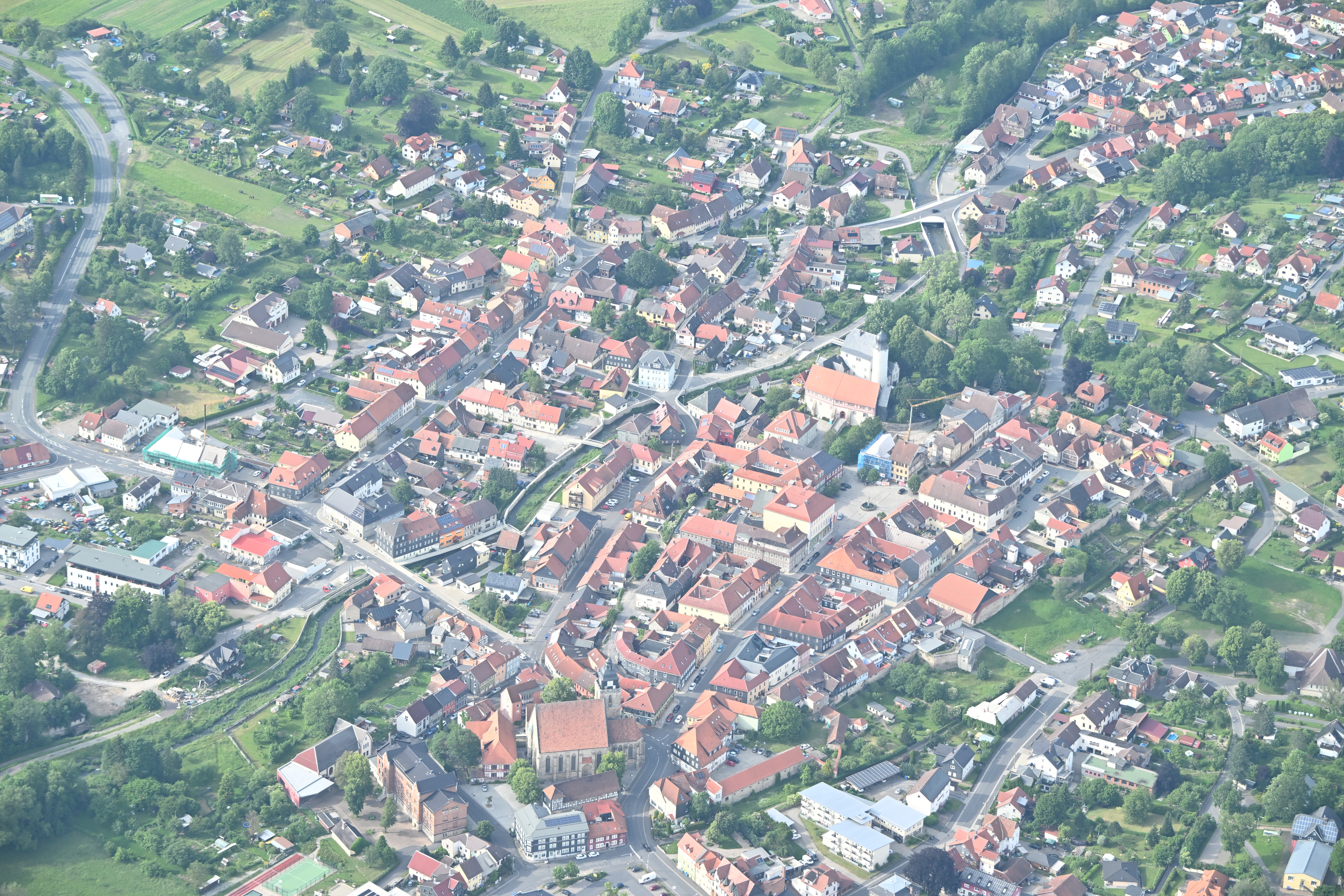
- Aerial view of Eisfeld

- Coat of arms

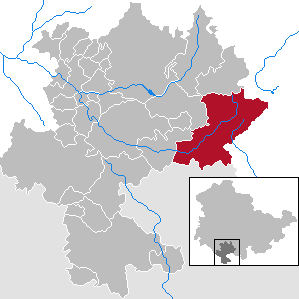
- Location of Eisfeld within Hildburghausen district
- Interactive map of Eisfeld
- Location within Germany Location within Thuringia
- Coordinates: 50°25′N 10°55′E
- Country: Germany
- State: Thuringia
- District: Hildburghausen
- Subdivisions: 6

Government
  - Mayor (2024–30): Christoph Bauer (FW)

Area
  - Total: 86.52 km^{2} (33.41 sq mi)
- Elevation: 440 m (1,440 ft)

Population (2025-12-31)
  - Total: 7,181
  - Density: 83.00/km^{2} (215.0/sq mi)
- Time zone: UTC+01:00 (CET)
  - Summer (DST): UTC+02:00 (CEST)
- Postal codes: 98673
- Dialling codes: 03686
- Vehicle registration: HBN
- Website: www.stadt-eisfeld.de

Eisfeld (German pronunciation: [ˈaɪsˌfɛlt]) is a town and a municipality in the district of Hildburghausen, in Thuringia, Germany. It is situated on the river Werra, 12 km east of Hildburghausen, and 19 km north of Coburg. The former municipality Sachsenbrunn was merged into Eisfeld in January 2019.

== Sons and daughters of the city ==
- Georg Rhau (1488–1548), book printer and Thomaskantor
- Carl Barth (1787–1853), draftsman and chalcographer
- Otto Ludwig (1813–1865), writer
