= Neudietendorf–Ritschenhausen railway =

Railway line in Germany

Neudietendorf–Ritschenhausen
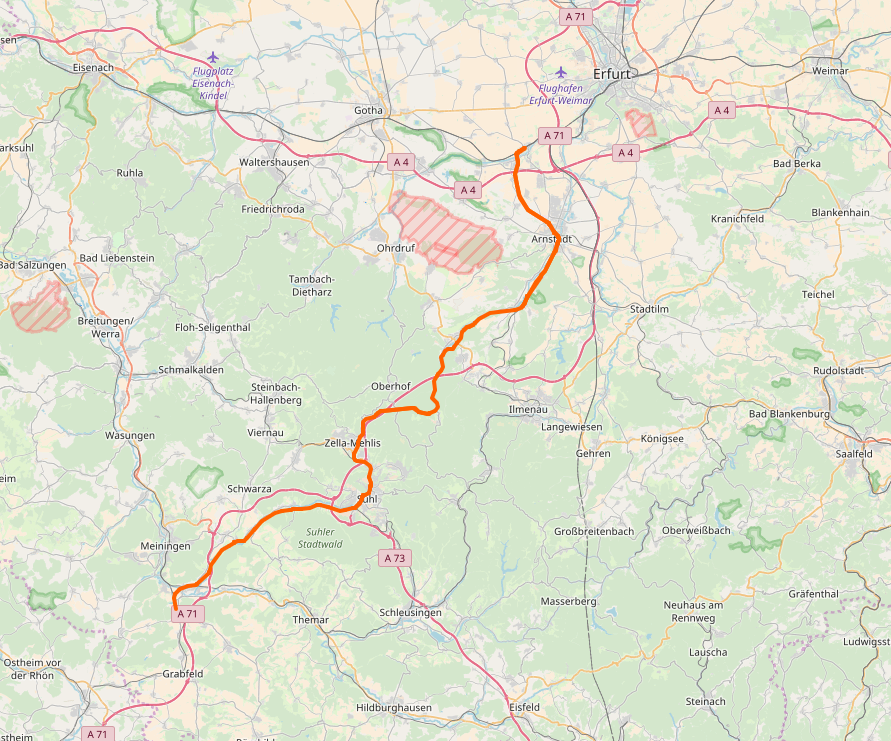

Overview
- Line number: 6298
- Locale: Thuringia, Germany

Service
- Route number: 570

Technical
- Line length: 75 km (47 mi)
- Number of tracks: 2: Neudietendorf–Plaue (Thür); Gehlberg–Oberhof (Thür)
- Operating speed: 160 km/h (99 mph) (max)

The Neudietendorf–Ritschenhausen railway connects Neudietendorf and Ritschenhausen in the German state of Thuringia. It is a mainly single-track main line operated by DB Netze.

== History ==
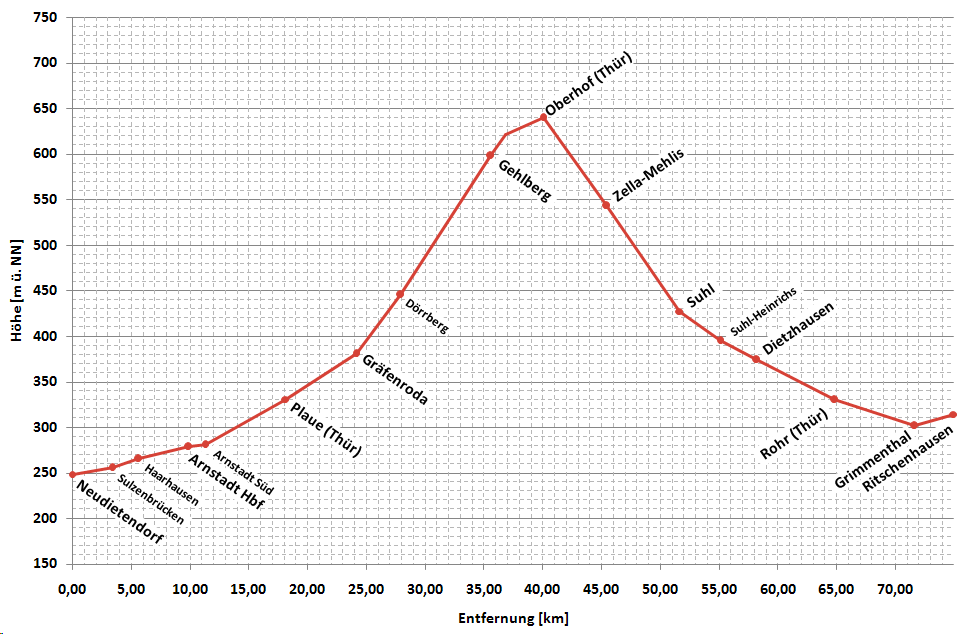
Simplified height profile of the line

The first ten kilometres of the Neudietendorf–Ritschenhausen line was built by the Thuringian Railway Company (German: Thüringische Eisenbahn-Gesellschaft) in 1867 as a branch line from Neudietendorf to Arnstadt. In 1879, the line was extended via Plaue to Ilmenau (Erfurt–Ilmenau line). Work on the crossing of the Thuringian Forest and the closing of the gap between Plaue and Ritschenhausen was started in 1879 by the Prussian state railways. Three years later, the Suhl–Grimmenthal section was inaugurated. Finally in 1884 the Grimmenthal–Ritschenhausen section and the 33 kilometre long section between Plaue and Suhl were completed. The building of this section included ramps with an average of grade of 2.0% and the 3,039 metre-long Brandleite Tunnel, which took just under four years to build and was very expensive. In August 1884 the first trains finally ran on the whole line.

The line quickly developed into a major north–south link, so that duplication between Neudietendorf and Grimmenthal was carried out between 1886 and 1893. Until the founding of the Deutsche Reichsbahn in 1920 Ritschenhausen station (built in 1874 and now heritage listed) and Meiningen (built in 1858 and 1874) were joint border stations of the Prussian and the Bavarian State Railways. Locomotives were changed for trains continuing through these stations to Erfurt or Schweinfurt.

After the Second World War, the connection towards Bavaria was interrupted by the border between the American and Soviet occupation zones. In 1946, the second track on the line was removed as part of reparations to the Soviet Union, except on the Gehlberg–Oberhof section. The track still remained an important link between southern Thuringia and Erfurt. Thirty years later, the second track was restored on the section from Neudietendorf to Plaue. In 1984, the Neudietendorf–Arnstadt section was electrified, because there was insufficient capacity available in Erfurt Hauptbahnhof for the nightly changes of locomotives of the Städteexpress ("city express") service from Meiningen to Berlin, as well as the adding of extra passenger coaches and freight wagons. These services ran through the Thuringian Forest with seven carriages and more carriages were needed east of Erfurt. The electrification between Neudietendorf and Arnstadt was taken out of operation in 1996 and later dismantled.

Between 2003 and 2008 the route was prepared for the use of tilting trains. The upgrade was completed for the December 2008 timetable change. It included, inter alia, the renovation of the Brandleite Tunnel, which had to be closed for nearly a year, and the installation of electronic interlocking in Arnstadt, which monitors the Neudietendorf–Rentwertshausen stretch.

== Operations ==
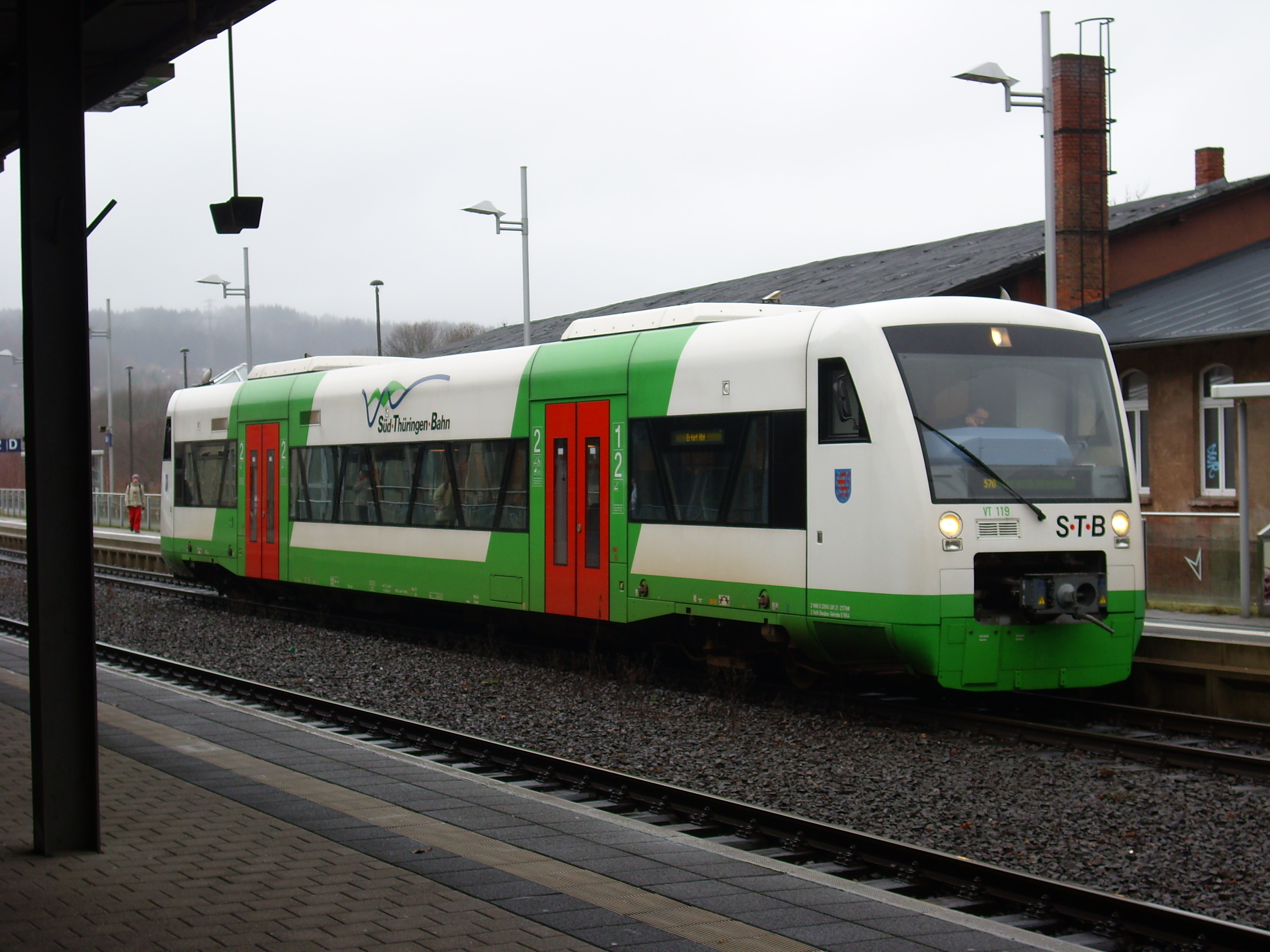
A Regio-Shuttle of the Süd-Thüringen-Bahn to Erfurt in Suhl

Despite some operational problems, such as slopes with a maximum grade of 2.38% in the Thuringian forest and the need to reverse trains running to Würzburg in Schweinfurt, the line was a major long-distance north–south link until 1945. It was the shortest route between Berlin and Stuttgart.

=== Passenger services ===
A fast train operated in the early 1890s from Berlin to Stuttgart via Erfurt, Meiningen and Schweinfurt. In 1914, there were three trains each day on this route, yet all ran via Meiningen, although they had to reverse there.

At its height in 1938 a daily pair of fast long-distance expresses (Fernschnellzug, FD-Zug, catering to first and second class passengers, but not third class passengers) and five pairs of ordinary expresses ran on the line, which ran on the Berlin–Erfurt–Schweinfurt–Würzburg–Stuttgart route. The FD 8 service included coaches that continued to Zurich and Ventimiglia in Italy. The night train pair D 13/14 even had coaches that continued to Rome and Naples. The high-quality passenger trains were hauled by class 39 locomotives. As train loads were often more than 250 tonnes, trains required an extra locomotive to push them up the grades to the Brandleite Tunnel.

After the Second World War, the only long-distance trains operated via Erfurt and Suhl to and from Meiningen. Express trains ran to Berlin, Dresden, Görlitz, Leipzig, Halle and Stralsund. In 1981, there were eight pairs of trains, including the Städteexpress, Rennsteig (named after a crest in the Thuringian Forest) and the Städteschnellverkehr (“city rapid”) service to Berlin.

With German reunification long-distance trains from Meiningen to Berlin were accelerated. The old service between Berlin and Stuttgart was revived for some years after the reunification as the InterRegio service, Rennsteig. From 1997, it operated only between Erfurt and Stuttgart and from 2001 the service was cancelled altogether.

In the timetable of 2009, the Mainfranken-Thüringen-Express runs on the line every two hours as Deutsche Bahn’s Regional-Express line 7 from Erfurt via Schweinfurt to Würzburg. Line STB4 of the Süd-Thüringen-Bahn runs every two hours from Erfurt to Meiningen, stopping at all stations, with additional services in the peak hour. There are also some additional Regional-Express services between Erfurt and Meiningen. The line between Neudietendorf and Plaue is also served by the Erfurter Bahn trains between Erfurt and Ilmenau. Ritschenhausen is also served by the Unterfranken-Shuttle of the Erfurter Bahn from Meiningen to Schweinfurt.

=== Freight ===
After completion of the line in 1884 there was intensive freight traffic, consisting of both through traffic and local agricultural traffic. In addition to numerous local trains, there was, for example in 1939, 12 through freight trains in each direction daily and four trains for train loads of up to 1,200 tons. These were usually hauled up the steep grades by class 95 locomotives and an additional locomotive was required to push trains with loads of over 1000 tonnes.

Even after the Second World War, the track in Thuringia was used by eight daily general freight trains from Arnstadt to Grimmenthal and up to five trains carrying full-train loads for high volume traffic. They were typically hauled by class 44 locomotives, using pulverised coal to avoid smoke while passing through the Brandleite Tunnel. From 1980, trains with up to 80 axles were mostly hauled by class DR-131 locomotives.

After the closing of the gap to the former West Germany after reunification, between 1991 and 1994 the line saw altered traffic flows and the last spike in freight traffic. Up to eight heavy freight trains ran daily on the north–south link. Since then freight trains run only when required, for example, freight trains to transport timber between Erfurt and Grimmenthal.
