= Erfurter Bahn =

Coordinates: 51.0075°N 11.0418°E

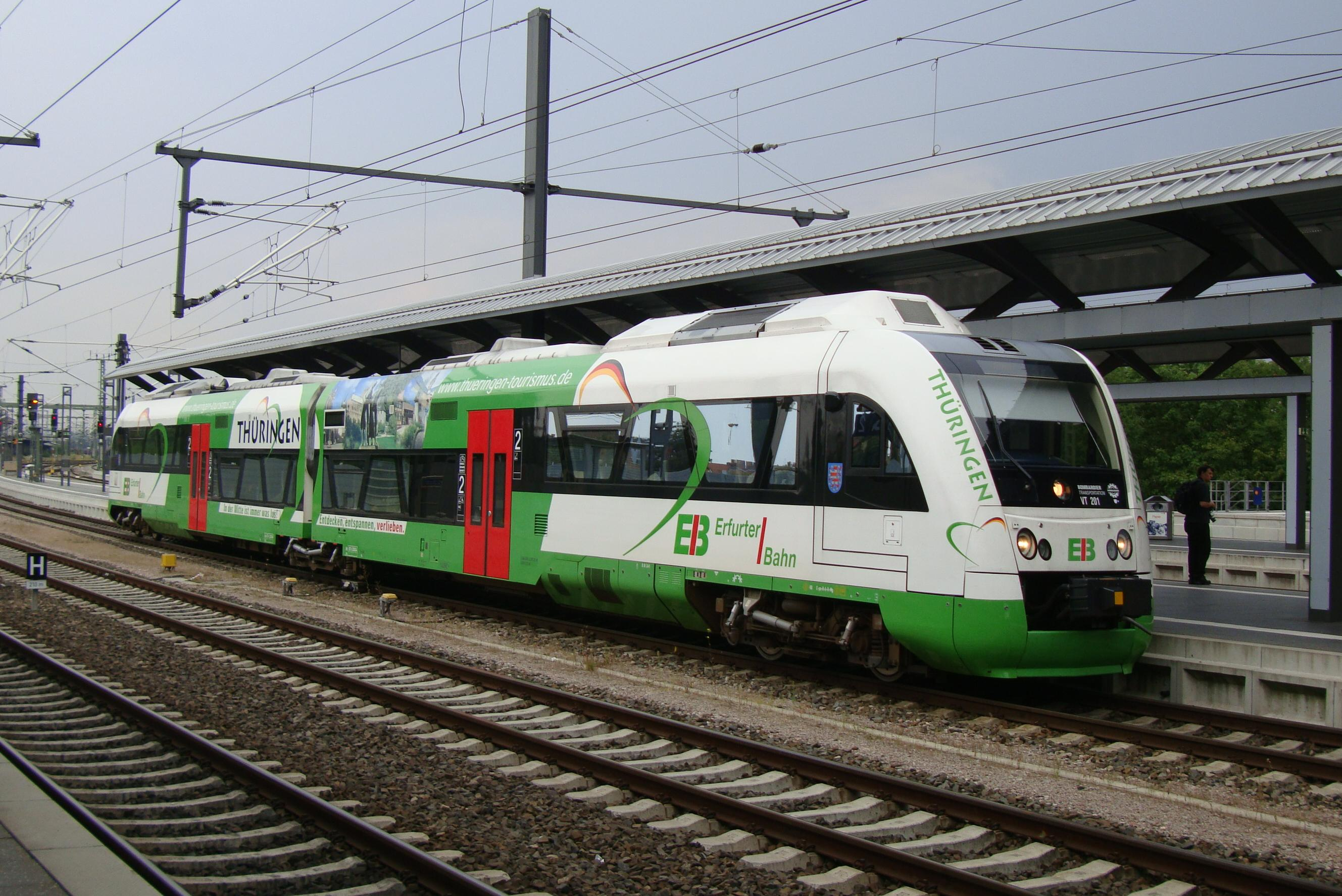
- A Bombardier Itino (VT 201) DMU at Erfurt Hauptbahnhof

Overview
- Owner: Stadt Erfurt
- Locale: Erfurt, Thuringia, Germany
- Transit type: Commuter rail
- Website: www.erfurter-bahn.de

Operation
- Began operation: 1912 (as Städtische Industriebahn); 2007 (as Erfurter Bahn)

The Erfurter Bahn (EB, lit. "Erfurt railway") is a railway company and public transit system serving the city of Erfurt, the capital of Thuringia, Germany. Erfurter Bahn is a wholly owned subsidiary of the Erfurt city council, and Süd-Thüringen-Bahn, operating between Erfurt and Meiningen, is a subsidiary of the former. Services are operated by Regio-Shuttle RS1 and Bombardier Itino trains.

Operations began in 1912 under the name of Städtische Industriebahn (municipal industrial railway), rebranded as the Erfurter Industriebahn in 1990 to coincide with its acquisition by the city council, and as the Erfurter Bahn in 2007 after passenger transport was added.

== History ==
The town of Erfurt operated an industrial railway, the Städtische Industriebahn (Municipal industrial railway), which commenced service on 8 May 1912. Even during the period of East Germany, the company remained independent because it was organised as a municipal institution (Städtischer Eigenbetrieb). After the reunification of Germany, the town tried to secure the railway service and founded on 1 May 1990 a GmbH, the Erfurter Industriebahn (EIB), with all capital shares held by Erfurt. On 20 September 1995, the company became the first municipal enterprise in East Germany to be recognized as an "öffentliche nichtbundeseigene Eisenbahn" (public non-federal railway). As the transport of goods alone seemed to have no future perspective, the company tried to enter regional passenger transport in Thuringia, a privilege that was granted on 10 April 1997. On 15 September that year, a contract was signed by the state of Thuringia and the EIB. The new focus was reflected in a new name, "Erfurter Bahn", on 3 March 2007. Erfurter Bahn is a subsidiary of the Erfurt city council. The trains used for passenger transport are the Regio-Shuttle RS1 and the Bombardier Itino.

In 1999 the EIB founded, together with the Hessische Landesbahn, the subsidiary Süd-Thüringen-Bahn (STB) directed from Meiningen, which carries regional traffic in southern Thuringia, while only the connections Erfurt–Würzburg and Erfurt–Meiningen are operated by the federal Deutsche Bahn. After years of developing new rules and guidelines, the Federal Railway Authority (Eisenbahn-Bundesamt) granted on 24 January 2014 a permission to the Regio-Shuttle-Triebwagen (Regional Shuttle Railcar) of the Erfurter Bahn to run on steep tracks, without remodeling. The track Bahnstrecke Plaue–Themar can thus be served, and the track Bahnstrecke Suhl–Schleusingen upon reopening.

Erfurter Bahn and Süd-Thüringen-Bahn employed in 2014 around 440 people. The railway designed a special train celebrating 1000 Jahre Leipzig in 2015, the celebration of the first documentation of the city.

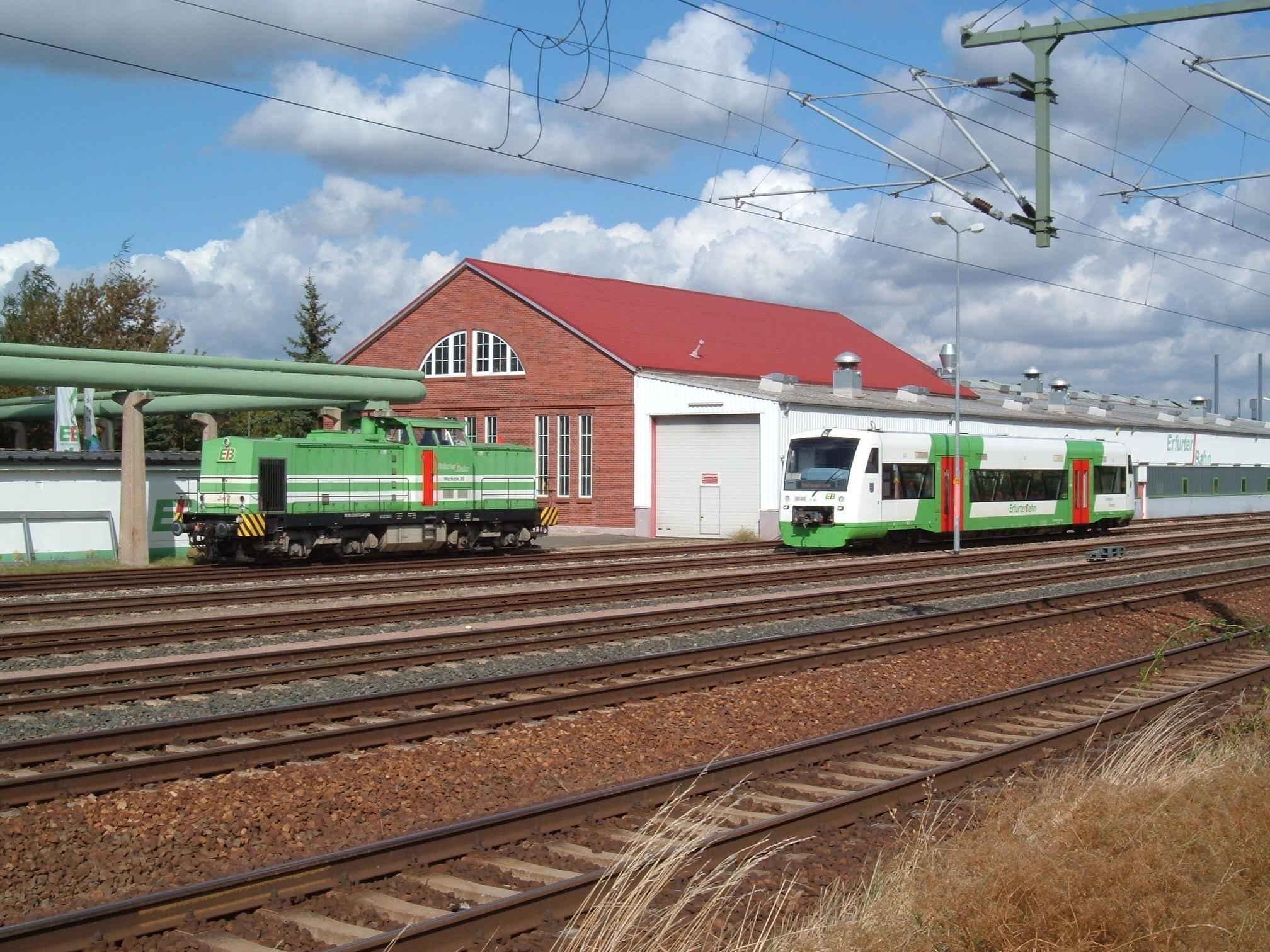
Engine 20 Lisa and RS1 in Betriebswerk Erfurt Ost

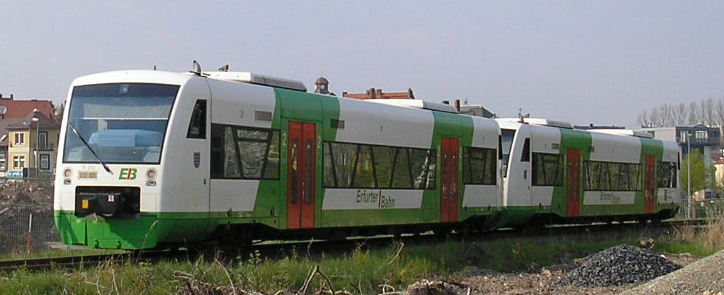
RS1 Luftkurort Stützerbach in Ilmenau

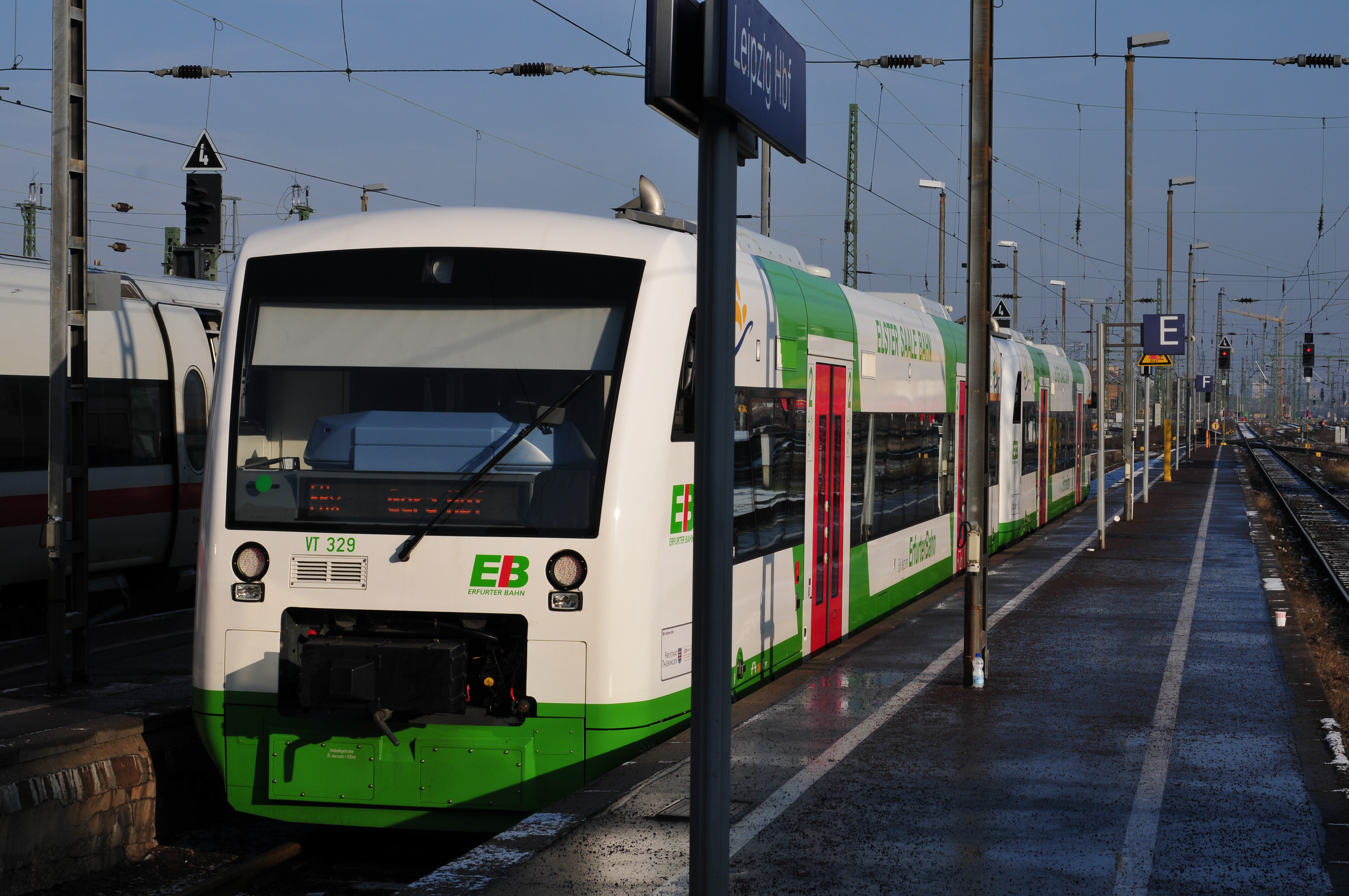
RS1 in Leipzig Hauptbahnhof

== Lines ==
Line 46 was opened on 14 December 2002. Known as the Bahnstrecke Plaue–Themar, it runs from Erfurt Hauptbahnhof via Ilmenau to the Rennsteig.

Lines 40 and 50 are called the Unterfranken Shuttle. Line 40 on the Schweinfurt–Meiningen railway, serves Schweinfurt and Meiningen, Line 50 on the Franconian Saale Valley Railway, serves Gemünden am Main, Bad Kissingen and Schweinfurt, ending not at the central station but continuing to Schweinfurt Stadt.

From 2012 the EB served additional lines in eastern Thuringia and into Saxony and Saxony-Anhalt, called the Elster Saale Bahn, including line 22 on the Leipzig–Probstzella railway, line 13 on the Werdau–Mehltheuer railway serving Gera, Weida, Zeulenroda and Hof, line 21 on the Weimar–Gera railway, serving Weimar, Gera and Jena, line 47 on the Arnstadt–Saalfeld railway, serving Erfurt Arnstadt, Rottenbach and Saalfeld, line 26 on the Weimar–Kranichfeld railway, serving Weimar Bad Berka and Kranichfeld, line 28 on the Orla Railway, serving Jena Kahla and Orlamünde, and line 32 on the Hockeroda–Unterlemnitz railway, serving Saalfeld Leutenberg, Wurzbach, Bad Lobenstein and Blankenstein. The trademark Elster Saale Bahn and the opening of these new lines in eastern Thuringia were announced at the centenary of the Erfurter Bahn.

=== Unterfranken Shuttle ===
Logo

Line	Transit time (in min)	Route	Sections	KBS-section- number	In operation
RB 40	120	Schweinfurt – Ebenhausen – Mellrichstadt – Meiningen	Schweinfurt–Meiningen	570, 815	12 December 2004 – 12 December 2026
RB 50	120	Schweinfurt – Ebenhausen – Bad Kissingen – Hammelburg – Gemünden	Gemünden–Ebenhausen; Schweinfurt–Meiningen	803, 815	12 December 2004 – 12 December 2026

All trains do not end in Schweinfurt at the main train station, but continue towards Bamberg to Schweinfurt Stadt, which is close to the city centre.

=== Elster Saale Bahn ===
Logo

The brand name Elster Saale Bahn was announced on the 100th anniversary of the Erfurt Bahn and has been used for the East Thuringian diesel network routes ever since.

Line	Transit time (in min)	Route	Sections	KBS-section- number	In operation
RE 12	120	Leipzig – Zeitz – Gera – Weida – Pößneck – Saalfeld – Blankenstein (Saale)	Leipzig–Saalfeld	550; 555	10 June 2012 – December 2036
RB 13	120	Gera – Weida – Zeulenroda – Mehltheuer – Hof	Gera–Weida; Weida–Mehltheuer; Mehltheuer–Hof	546	10 June 2012 – December 2036
RB 21	60 / 120	Erfurt – Weimar – Jena-Göschwitz – Hermsdorf-Klosterlausnitz – Gera	Erfurt–Weimar; Weimar–Gera	565	10 June 2012 – December 2036
RB 22	120	Leipzig – Zeitz – Gera – Weida – Pößneck – Saalfeld	Leipzig–Saalfeld	550; 555	10 June 2012 – December 2036
RB 26	60	Weimar – Bad Berka – Kranichfeld	Weimar–Kranichfeld	579	10 June 2012 – December 2036
RB 28	120	Jena – Kahla – Orlamünde – Pößneck	Jena–Orlamünde; Orlamünde–Pößneck	559	10 June 2012 – December 2036
RB 32	120	Saalfeld – Hockeroda – Wurzbach (Thür) – Bad Lobenstein – Blankenstein (Saale)	Saalfeld–Hockeroda; Hockeroda–Unterlemnitz; Unterlemnitz–Blankenstein	557	10 June 2012 – December 2036
RB 23	60	Erfurt – Neudietendorf – Arnstadt – Rottenbach – Bad Blankenburg (Thüringerw) – Saalfeld	Erfurt–Neudietendorf; Neudietendorf–Arnstadt; Arnstadt–Saalfeld	561	10 June 2012 – 14 December 2024
RE 47	(2 trips daily)	Erfurt – Rottenbach – Saalfeld	Erfurt–Neudietendorf Neudietendorf–Arnstadt Arnstadt–Saalfeld	561	10 June 2012 – 14 December 2024
RB 76	60	Weißenfels – Zeitz	Weißenfels–Zeitz	551	15 December 2024 – December 2036

=== Erfurt Railway ===
Line	Transit time (in min)	Route	Sections	KBS-section- number	In operation
RB 27	120	Sömmerda – Kölleda – Buttstädt	Sömmerda–Buttstädt	594	10 December 2017 – December 2029

During peak hour and weekend night traffic, some trains run between Erfurt, Weimar and Apolda.

=== Former Lines ===
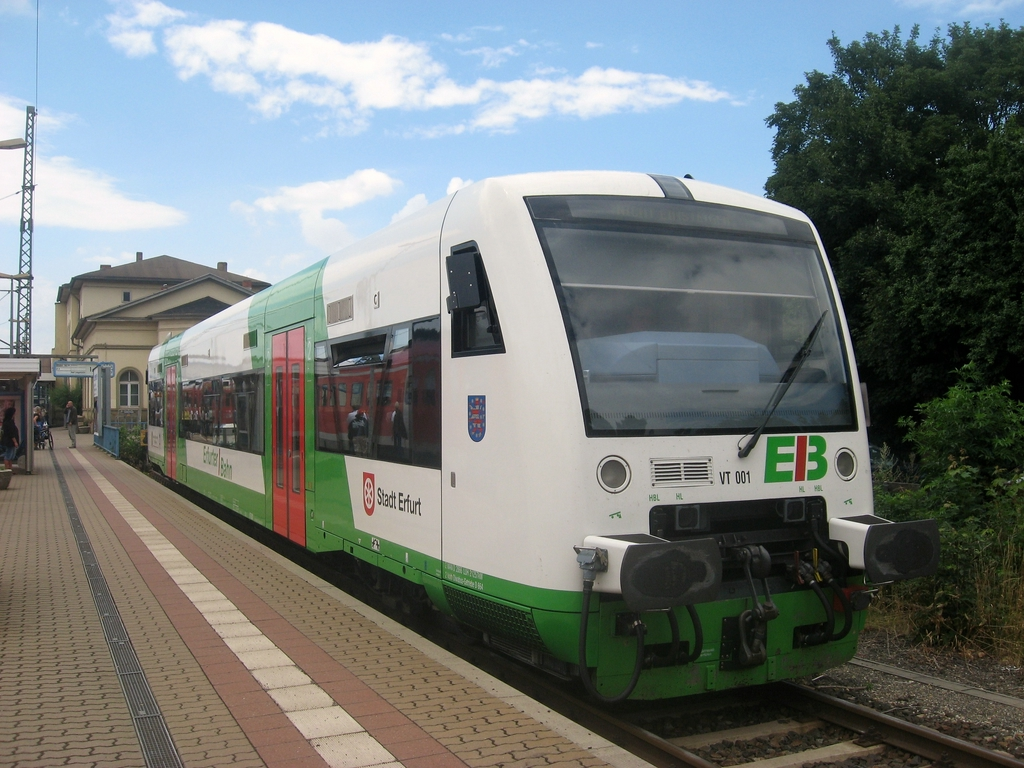
VT 001 of the Erfurter Bahn at Gotha Bahnhof

Logo

- EB 1: Erfurt Hbf – Bad Langensalza – Mühlhausen – Leinefelde – Eichenberg (since 24 May 1998), continuing to Kassel-Wilhelmshöhe (operated May 1999–December 2013, reduced from December 2006)
- EB 2: Gotha – Bad Langensalza (operated May 2000–December 2013)

When the timetable changed in December 2006, the Nordhessische Verkehrsverbund contracted a large part of the SPNV services of the EB in its area, so that the majority of the trains reversed in Eichenberg and only some services ran through to Kassel-Wilhelmshöhe. After massive passenger complaints and a significant decline in the number of passengers, EB has been running most of the trains between Eichenberg and Kassel-Wilhelmshöhe since 1 April 2007 on its own account, which according to its statements amounted to about 80 percent of the train kilometres operated on this section until the timetable change in 2006. A pair of trains that initially ran to Göttingen in the morning and also on their own account have also reversed in Kassel-Wilhelmshöhe since the timetable change in 2007. On 15 December 2013, operations on lines 1 and 2 were handed over to DB Regio.

The Erfurt–Ilmenau–Rennsteig line and the service station at Ilmenau station were handed over to the subsidiary Süd-Thüringen-Bahn in December 2017, which had previously operated them on behalf of the Erfurter Bahn.

Line	Transit time (in min)	Route	Sections	KBS-section- number	In operation
RB 46	60	Erfurt – Neudietendorf – Arnstadt – Plaue (Thür) – Ilmenau – Rennsteig	Erfurt–Neudietendorf; Neudietendorf–Plaue; Plaue–Rennsteig	566	14 December 2002 – 9 December 2017

== Literature ==
- Frehner Consulting GmbH (ed.): Erfurter Bahn, Kommt gut an – In Tradition und Leistung seit 1912 (in German) 2007
- Burkhard Beyer: Thüringer fahren bald in Bayern. Erfurter Industriebahn expandiert. In: LOK MAGAZIN. Nr. 261/Jahrgang 42/2003. GeraNova Zeitschriftenverlag GmbH München, ISSN 0458-1822, p. 18.
