= List of railway stations in Thuringia =

This list includes all 318 stations in Thuringia, that are currently served by public transport.

== Description ==
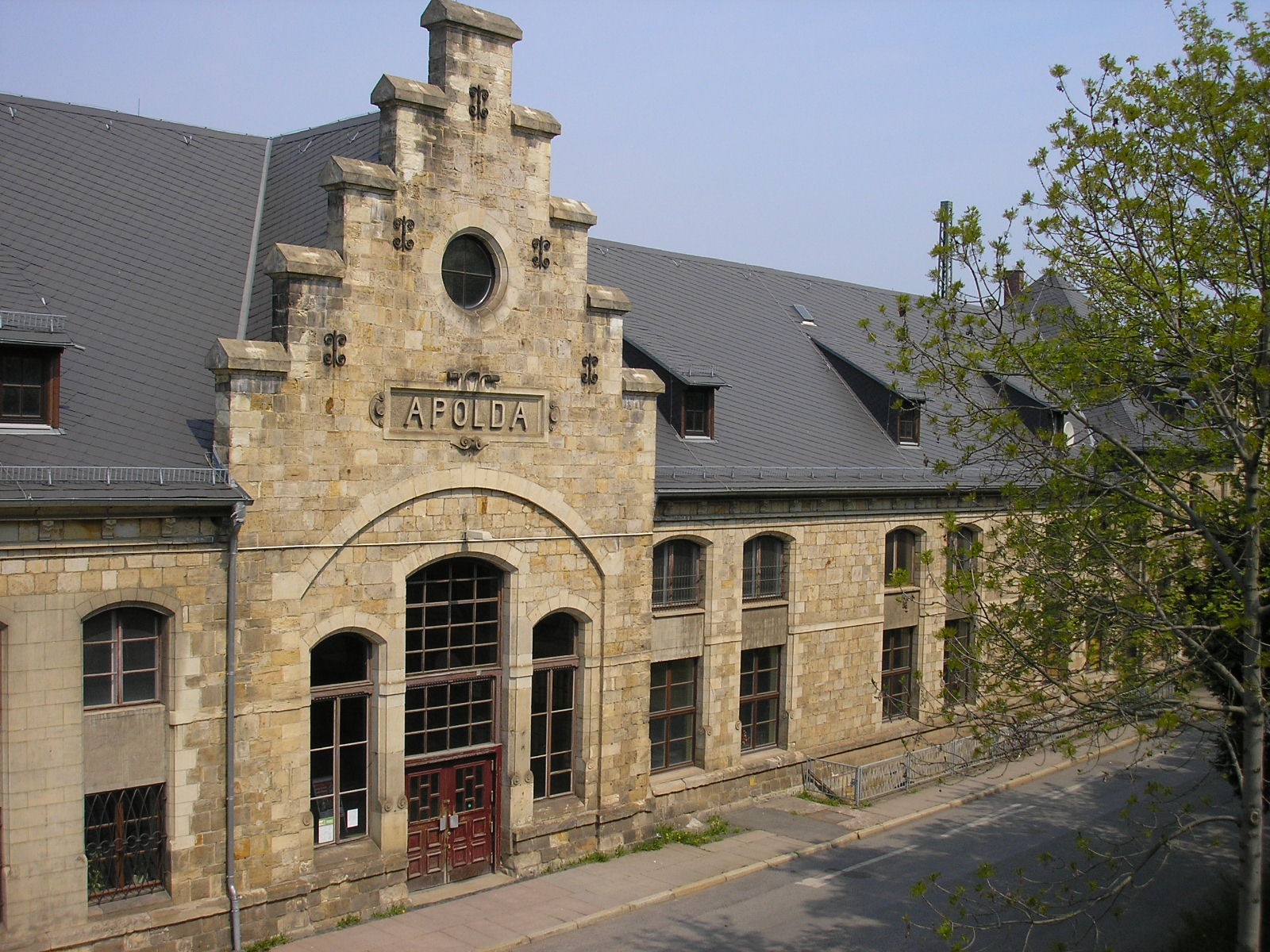
Apolda

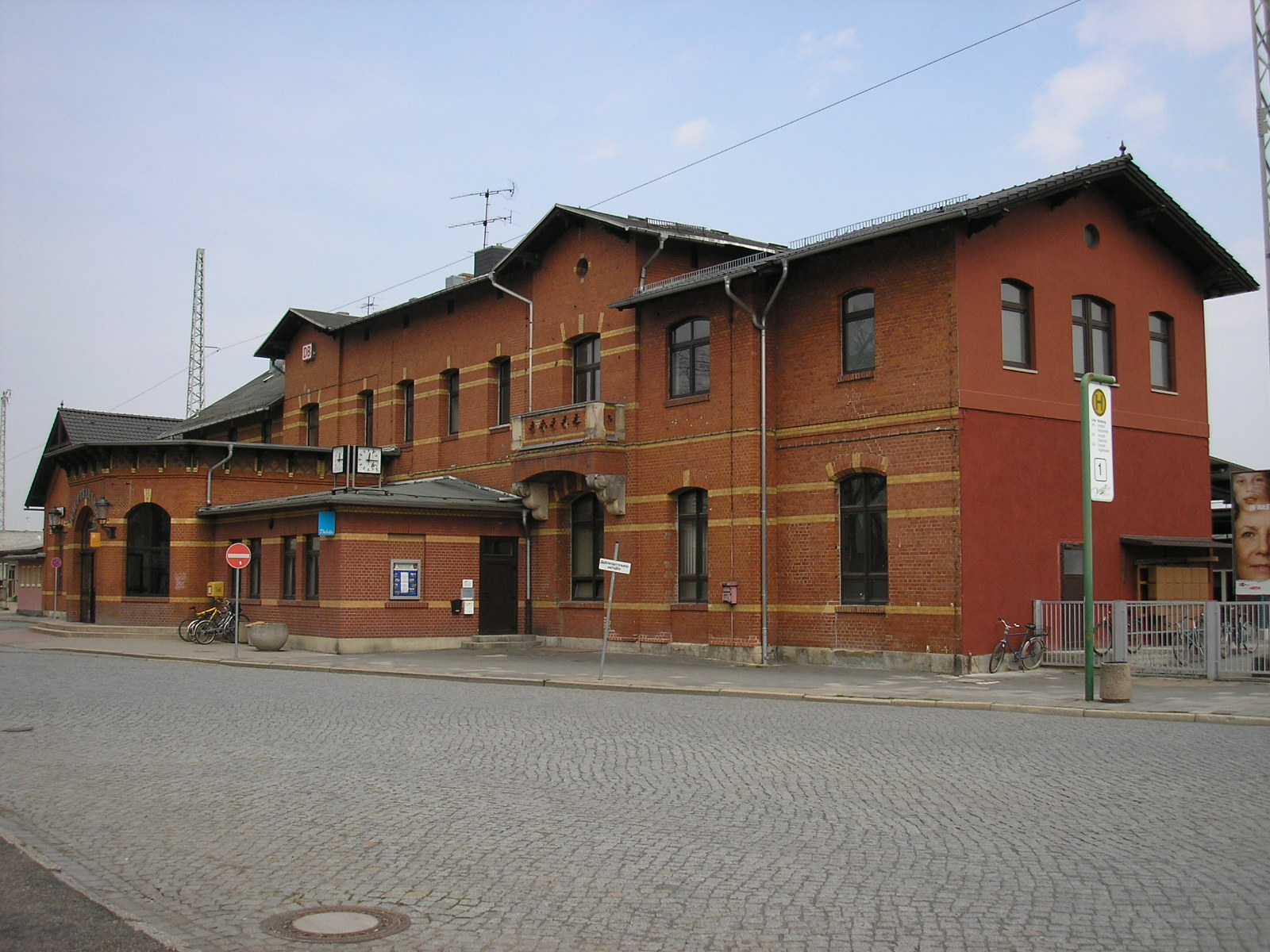
Arnstadt Hbf

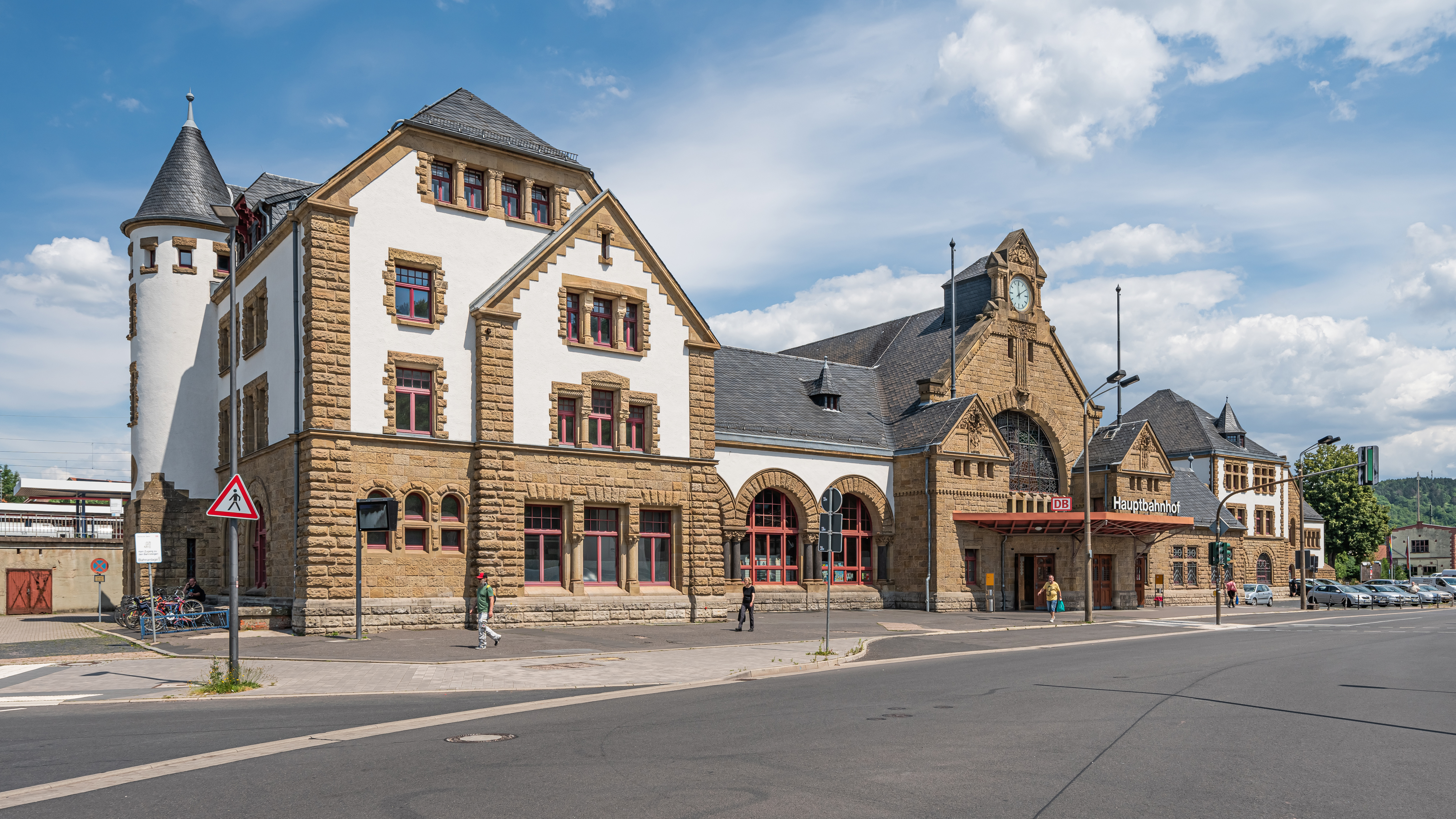
Eisenach

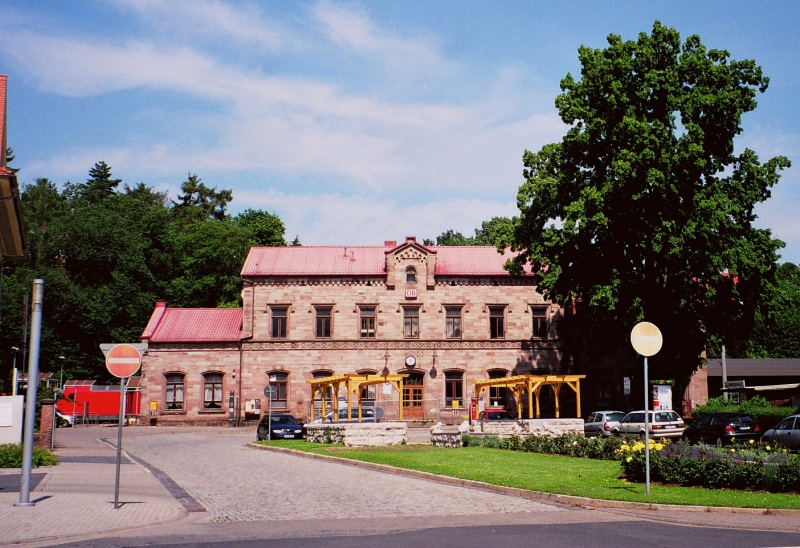
Heiligenstadt

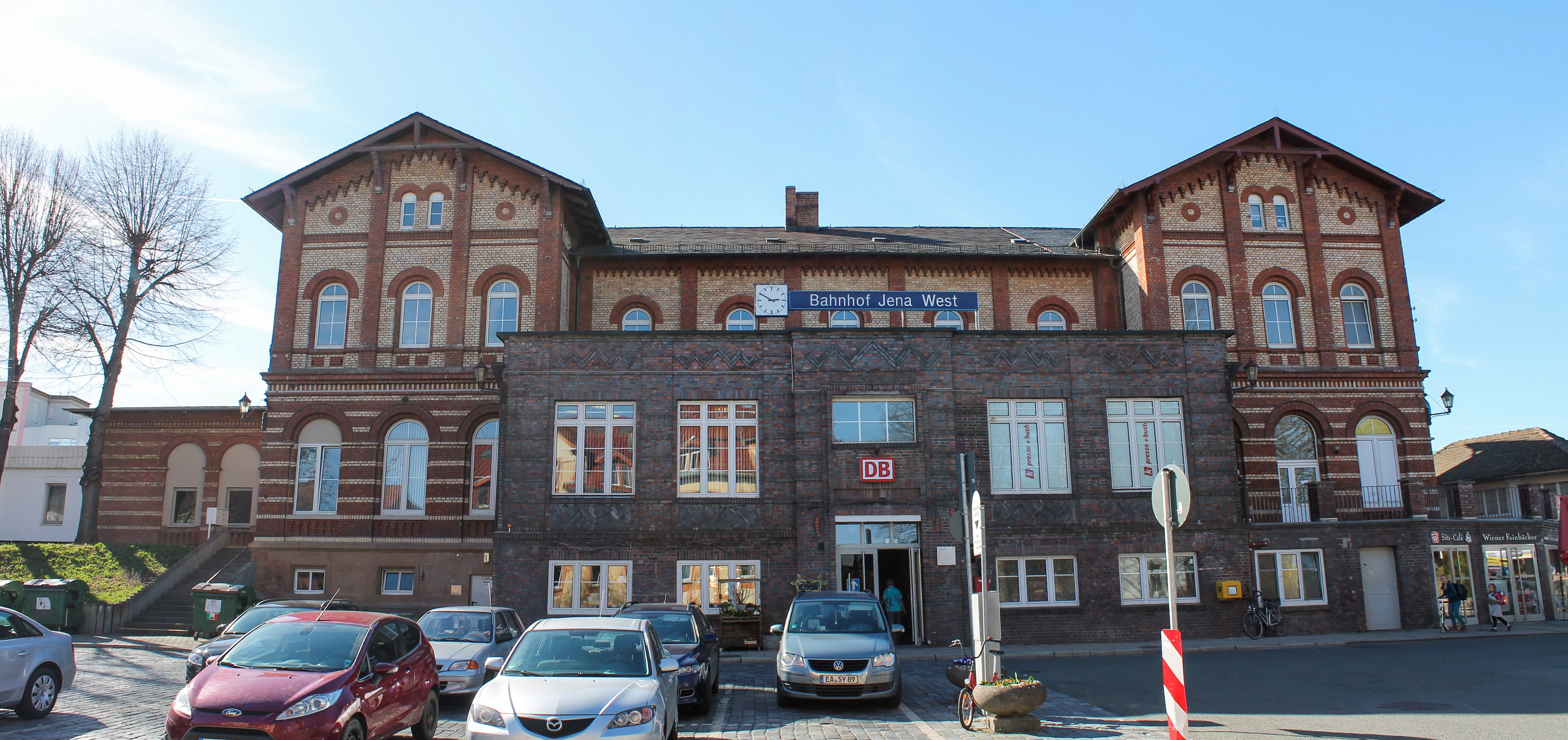
Jena West

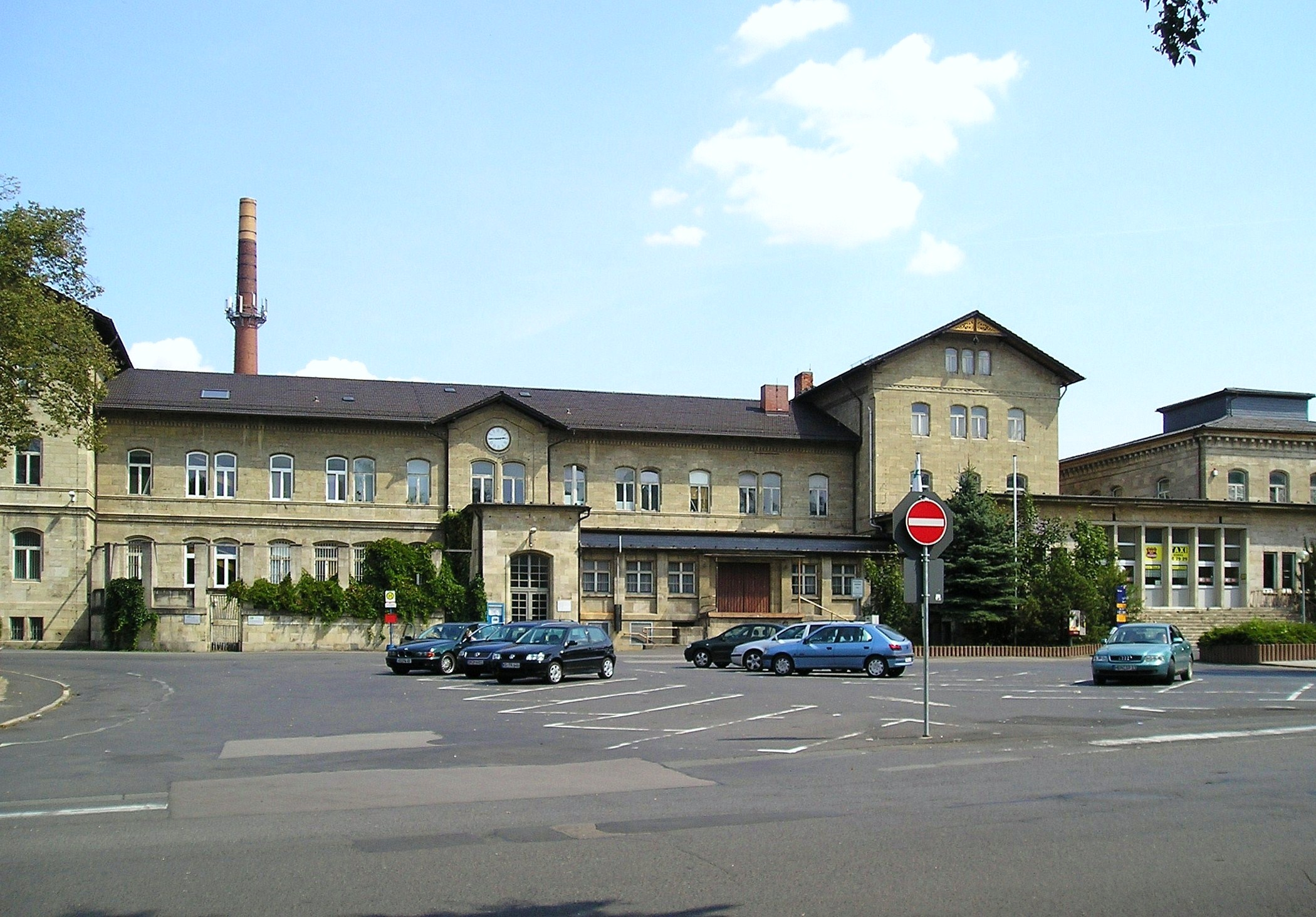
Meiningen

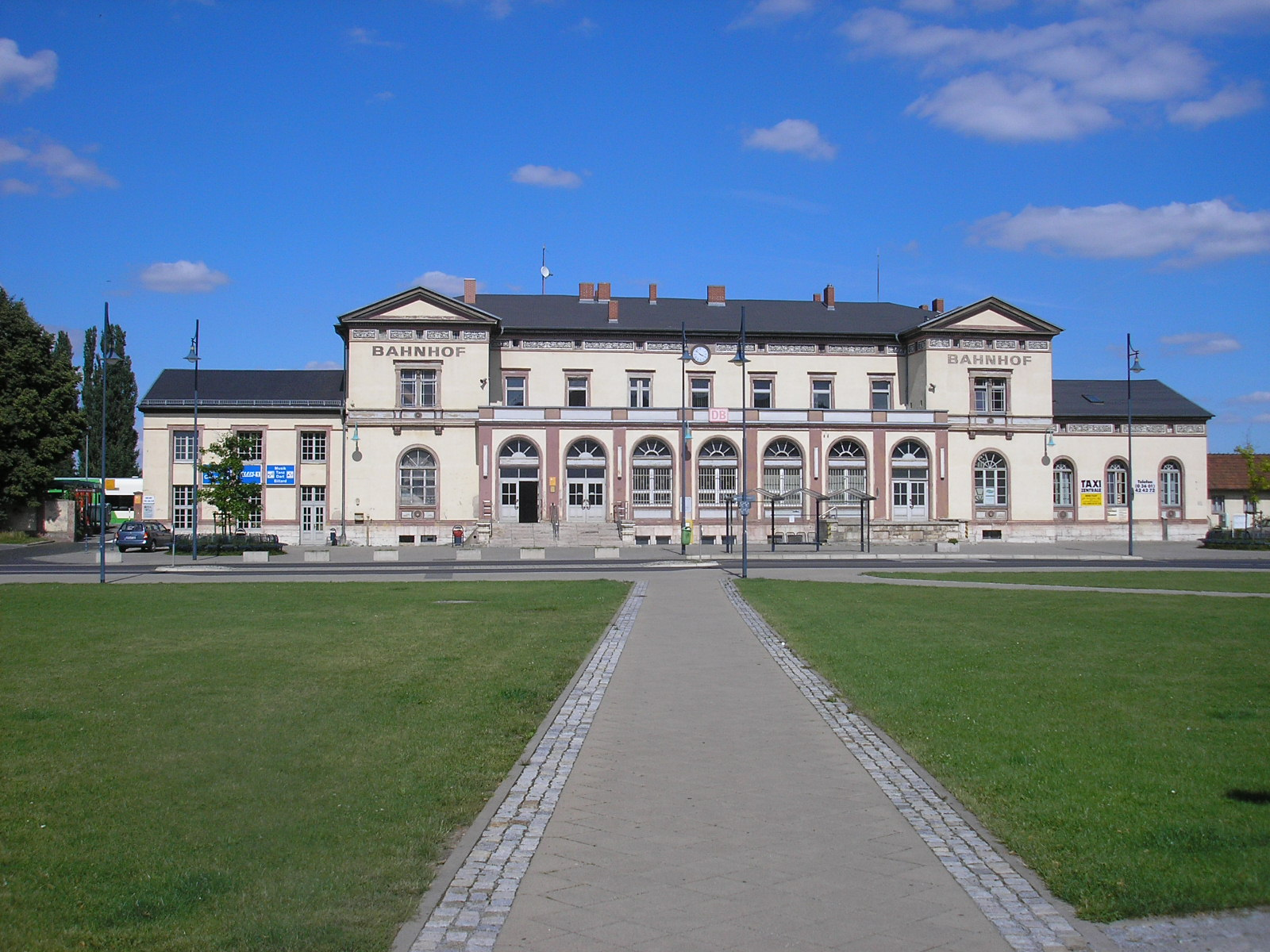
Mühlhausen

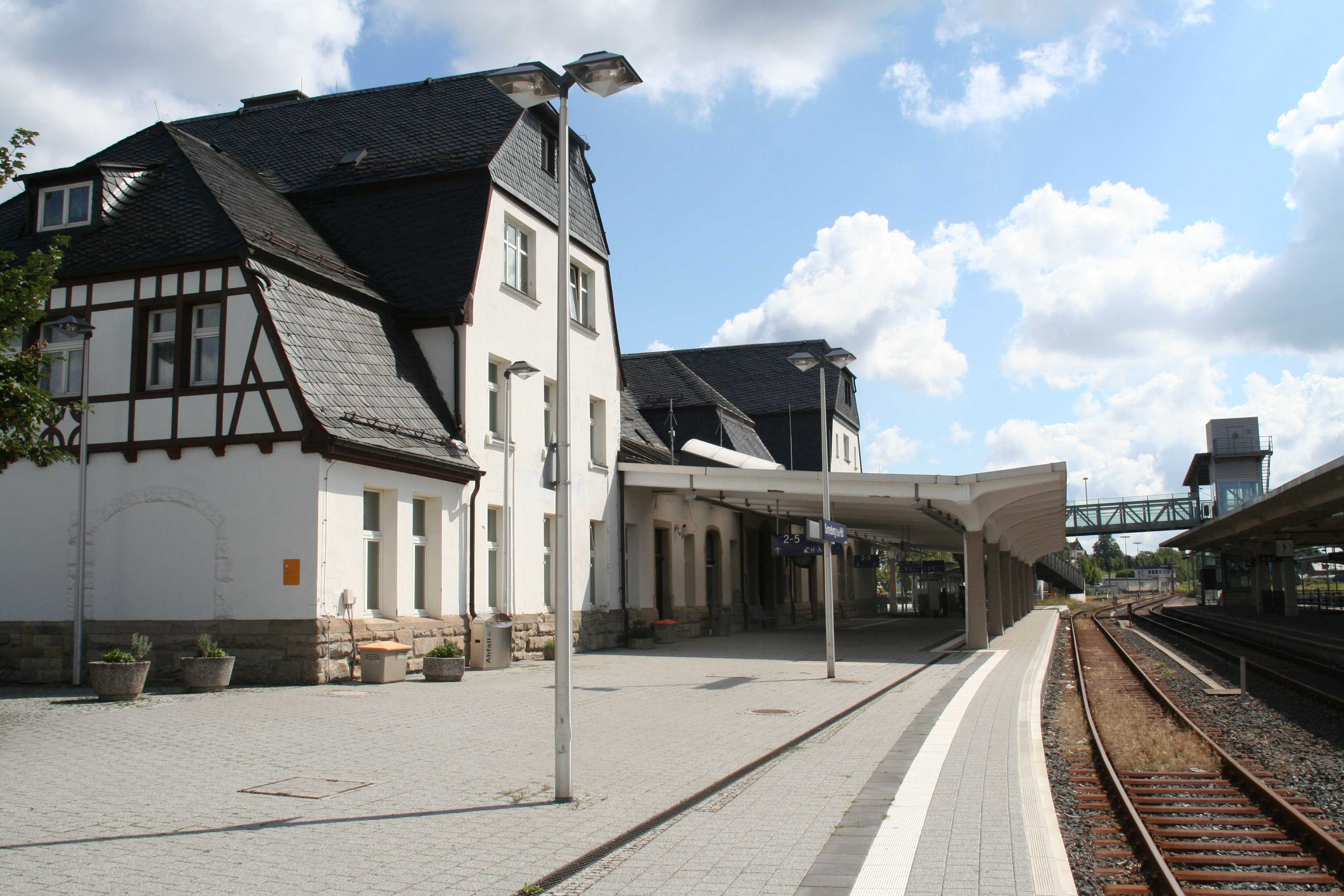
Sonneberg Hbf

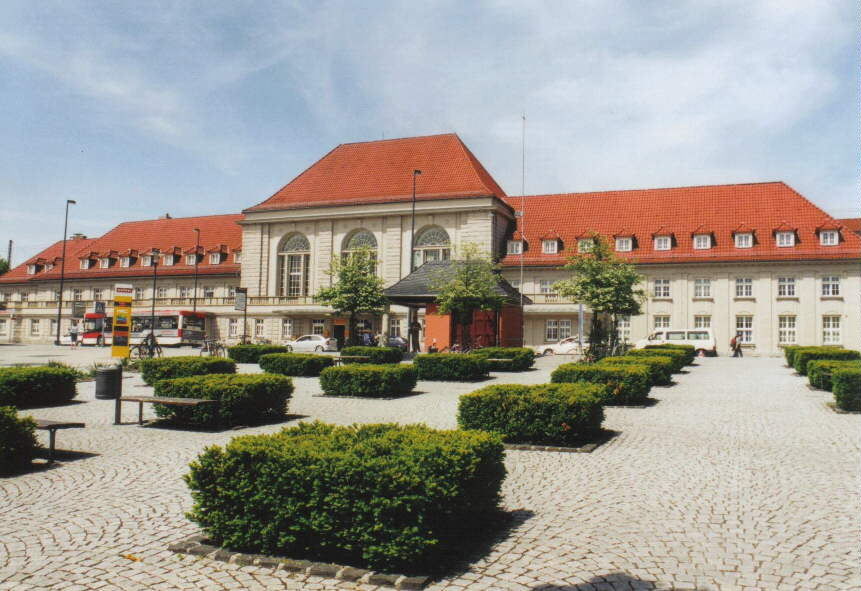
"Kultur-Bahnhof" Weimar, The most customer-friendly station in its class in 2005

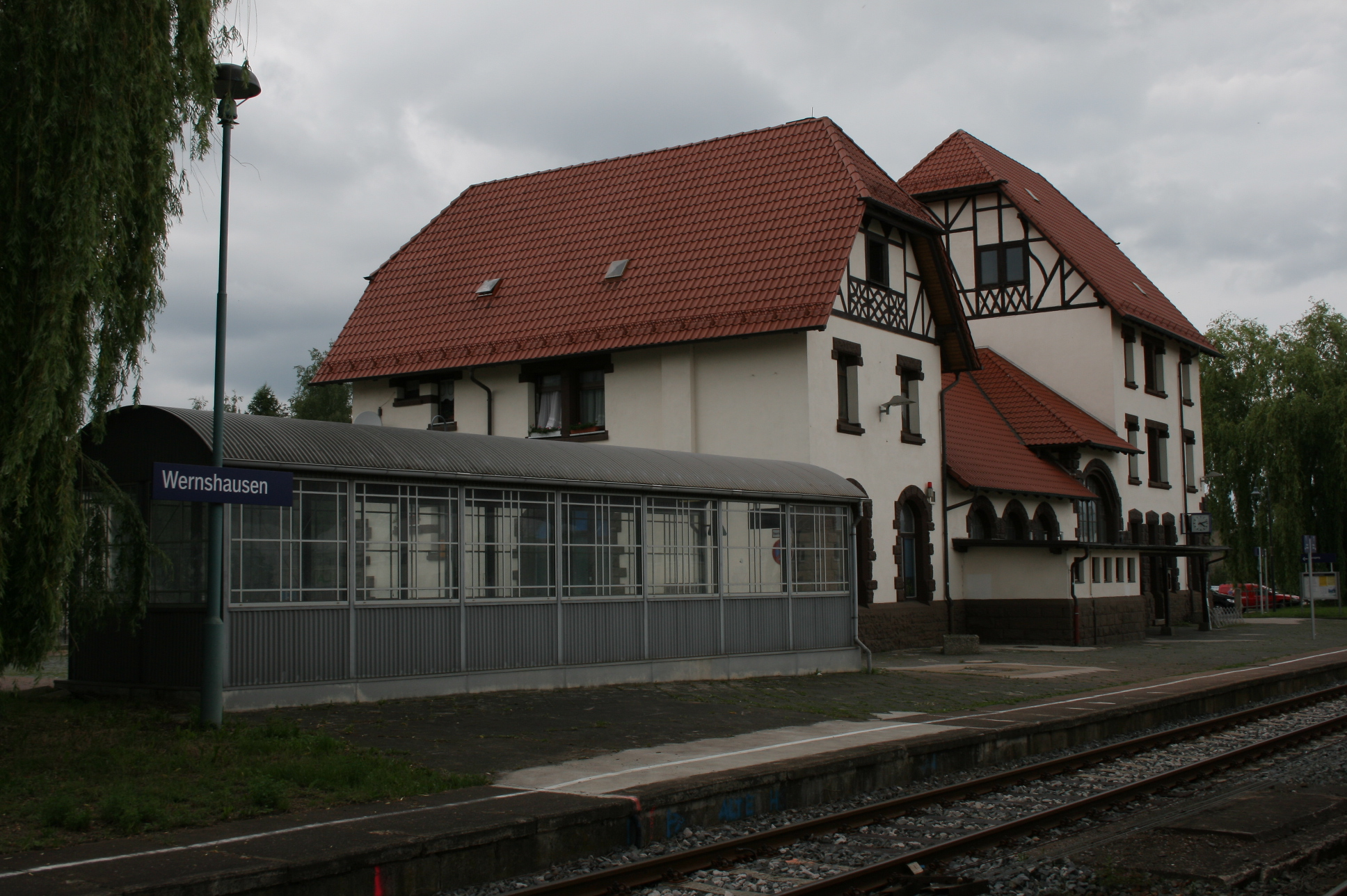
Wernshausen

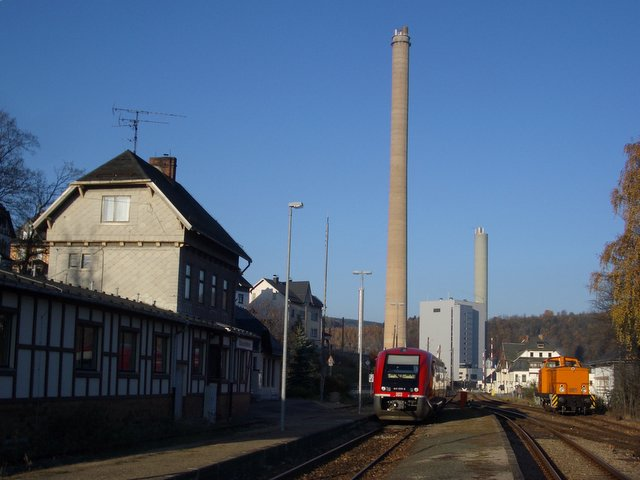
Blankenstein (Saale)

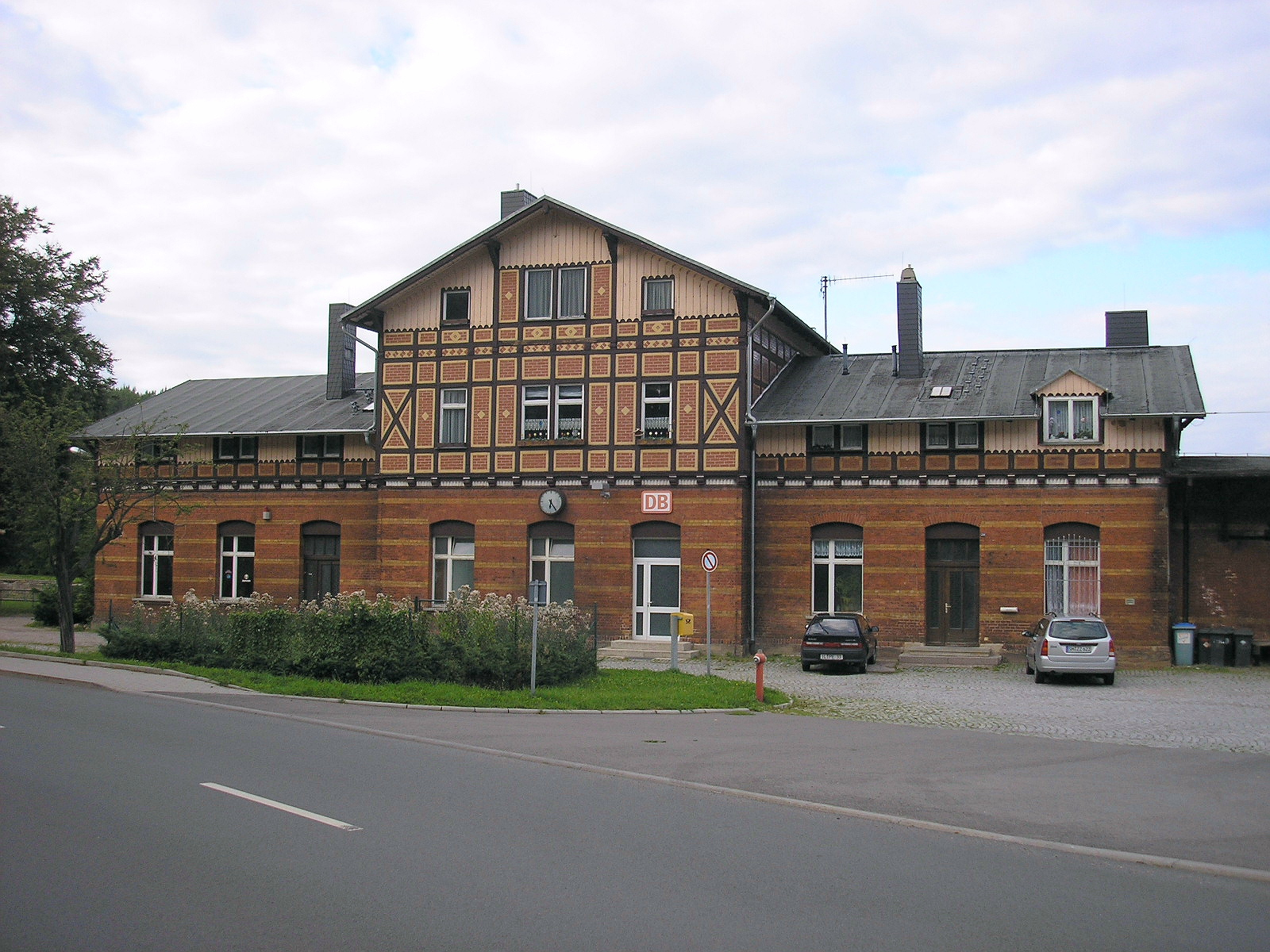
Elgersburg

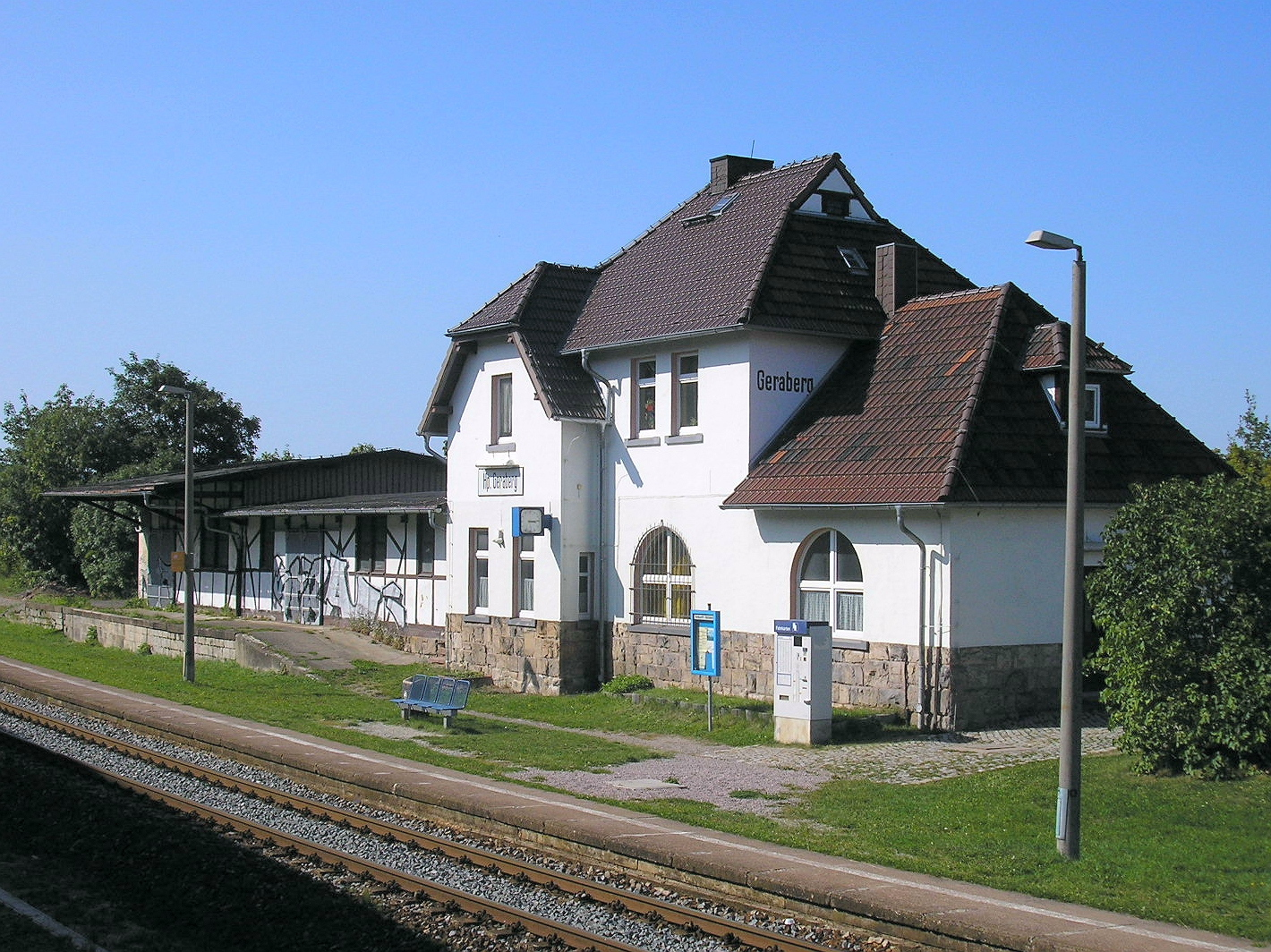
Geraberg

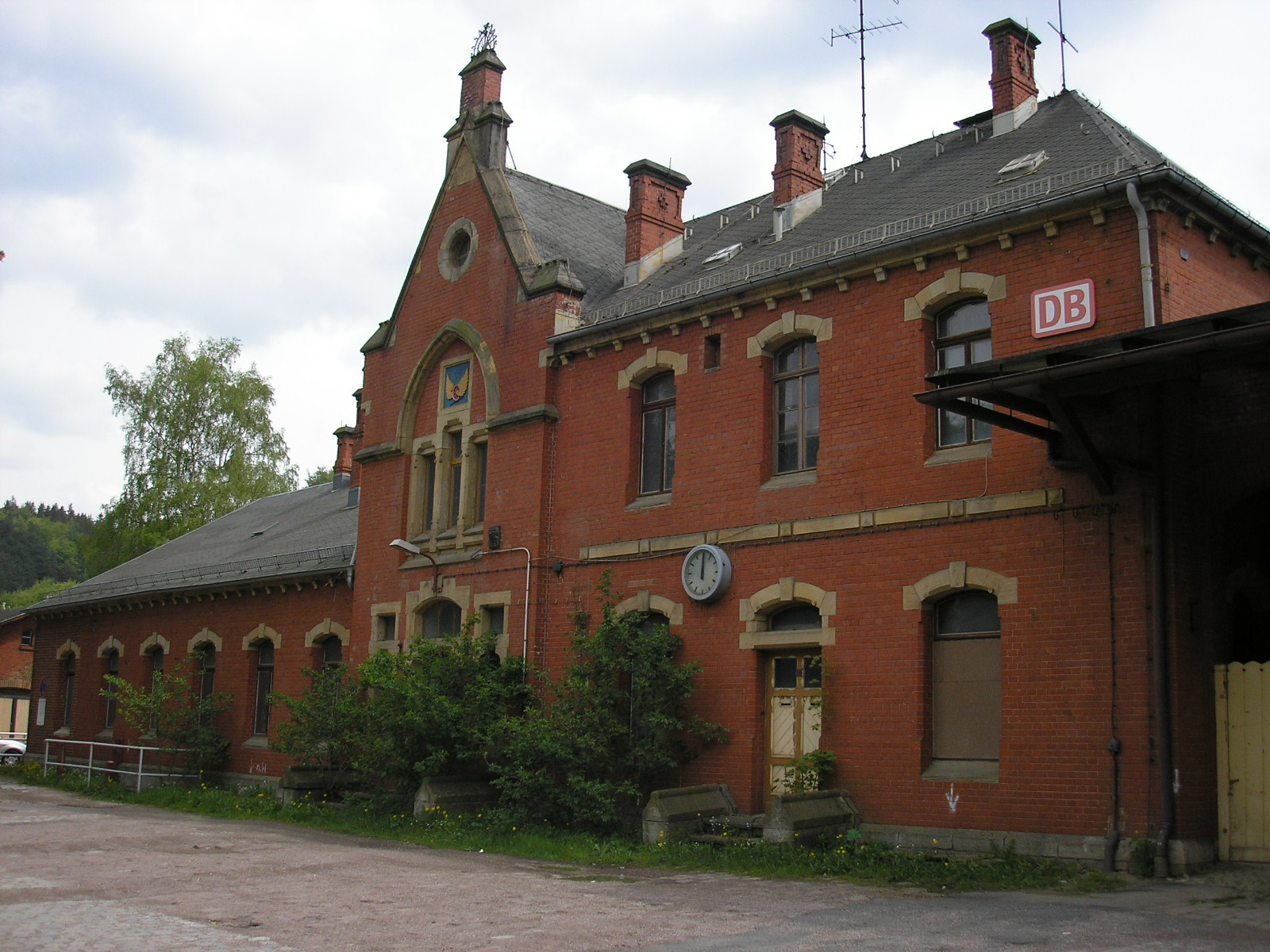
Gräfenroda

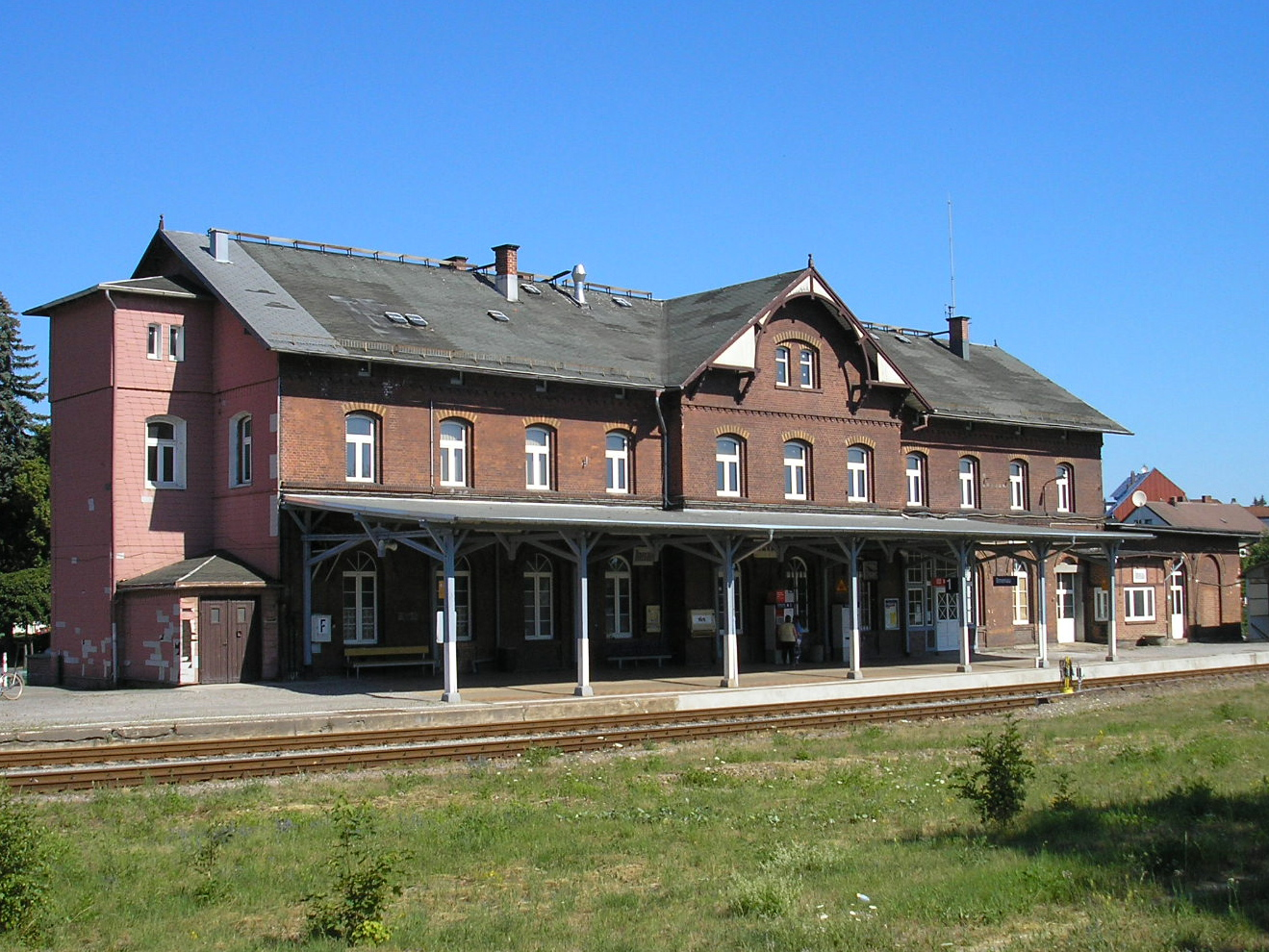
Ilmenau

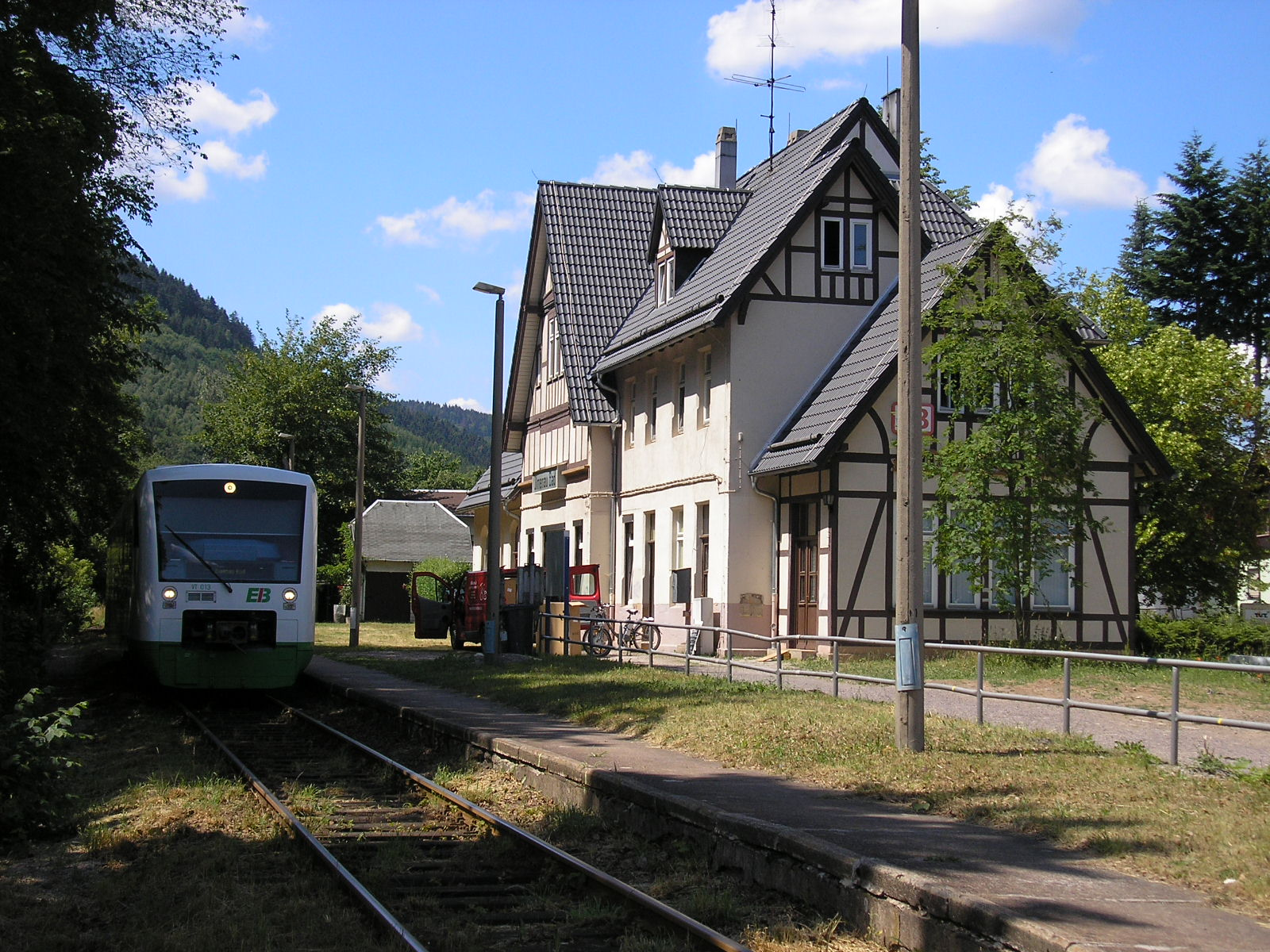
Ilmenau Bad

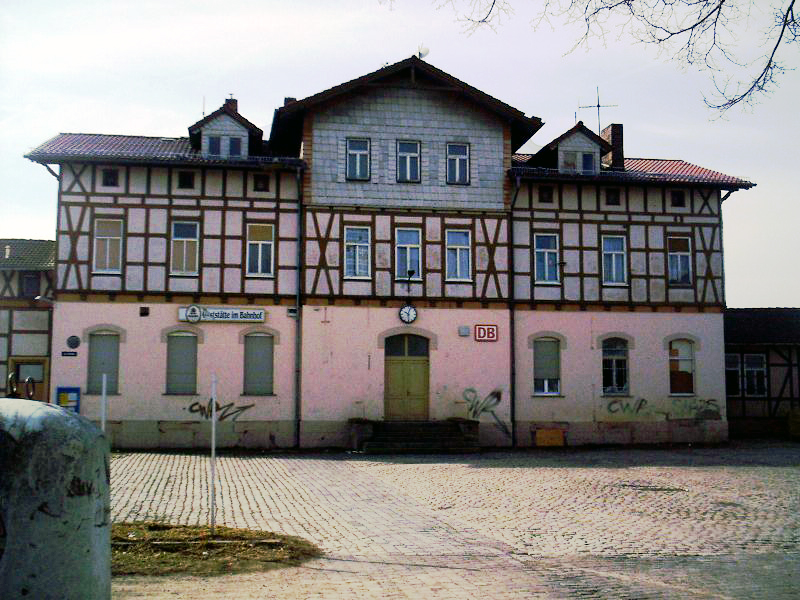
Kölleda

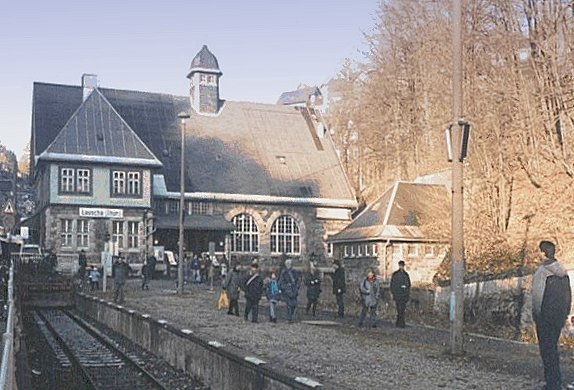
Lauscha

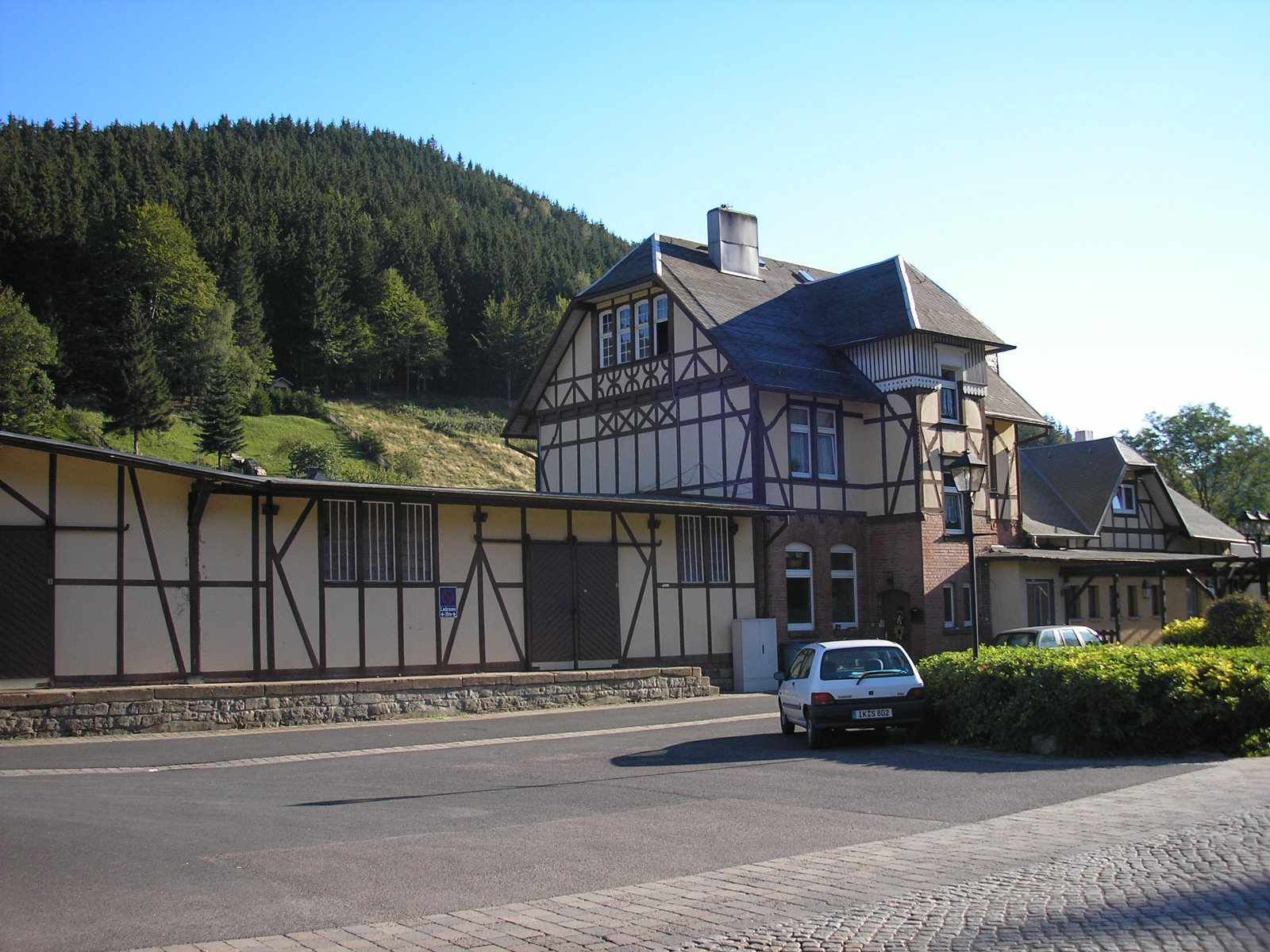
Manebach

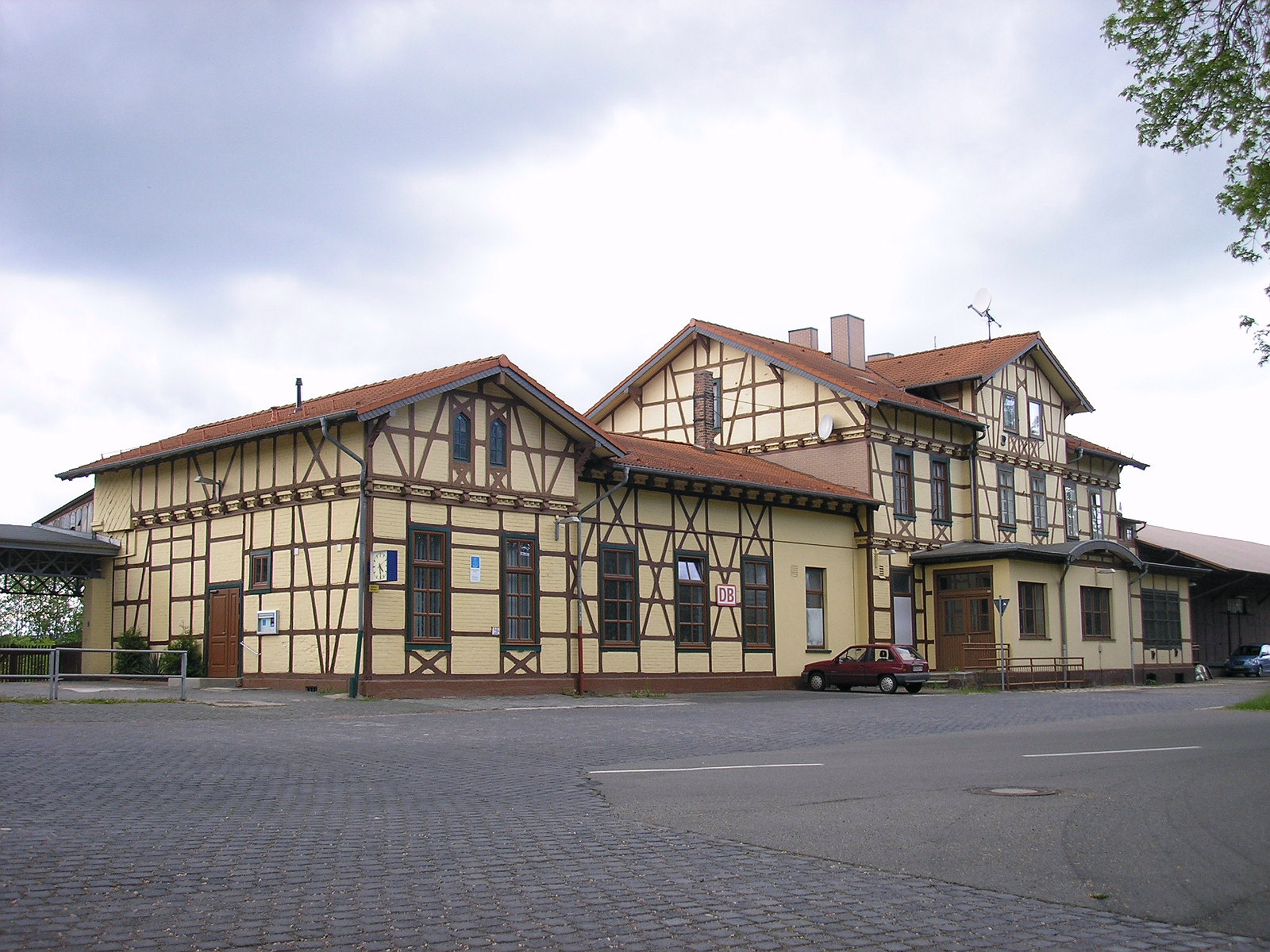
Ohrdruf

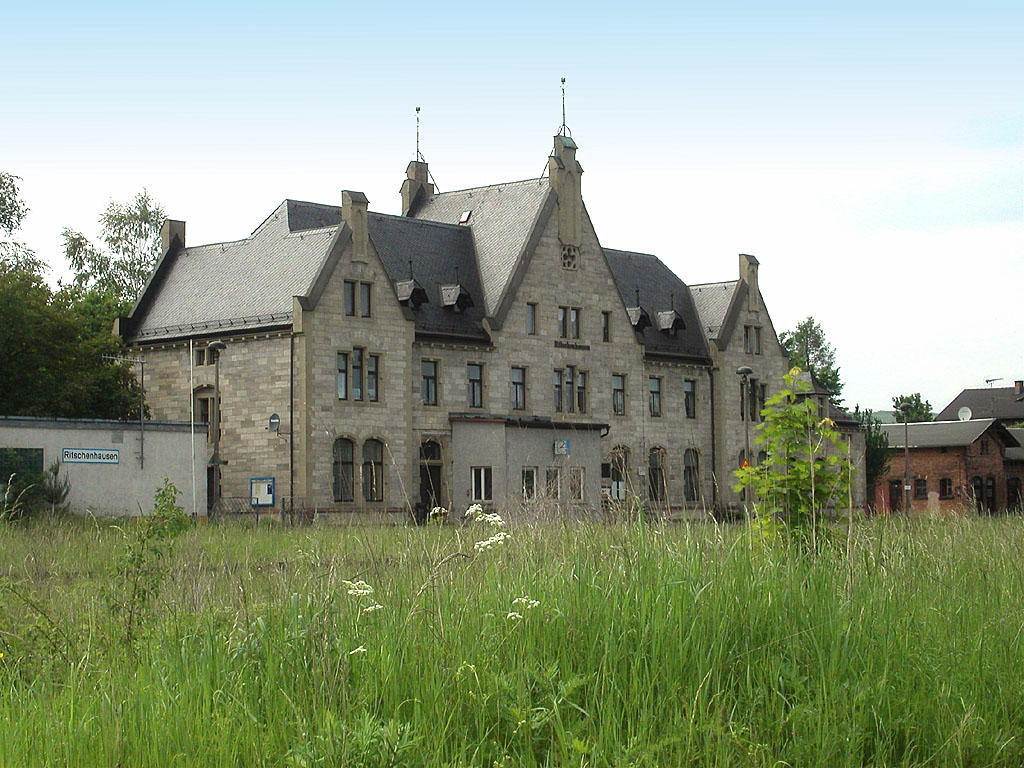
Ritschenhausen

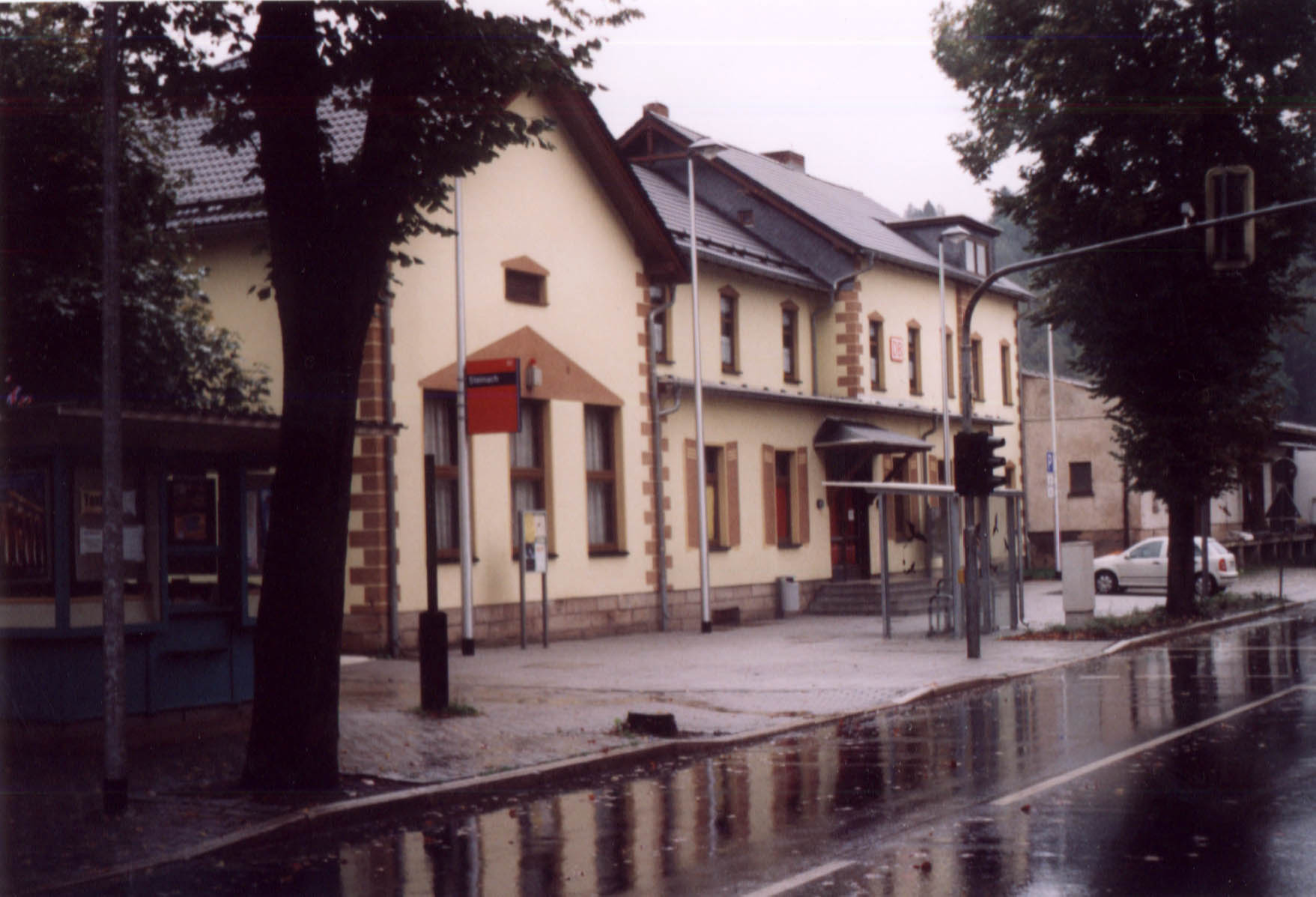
Steinach

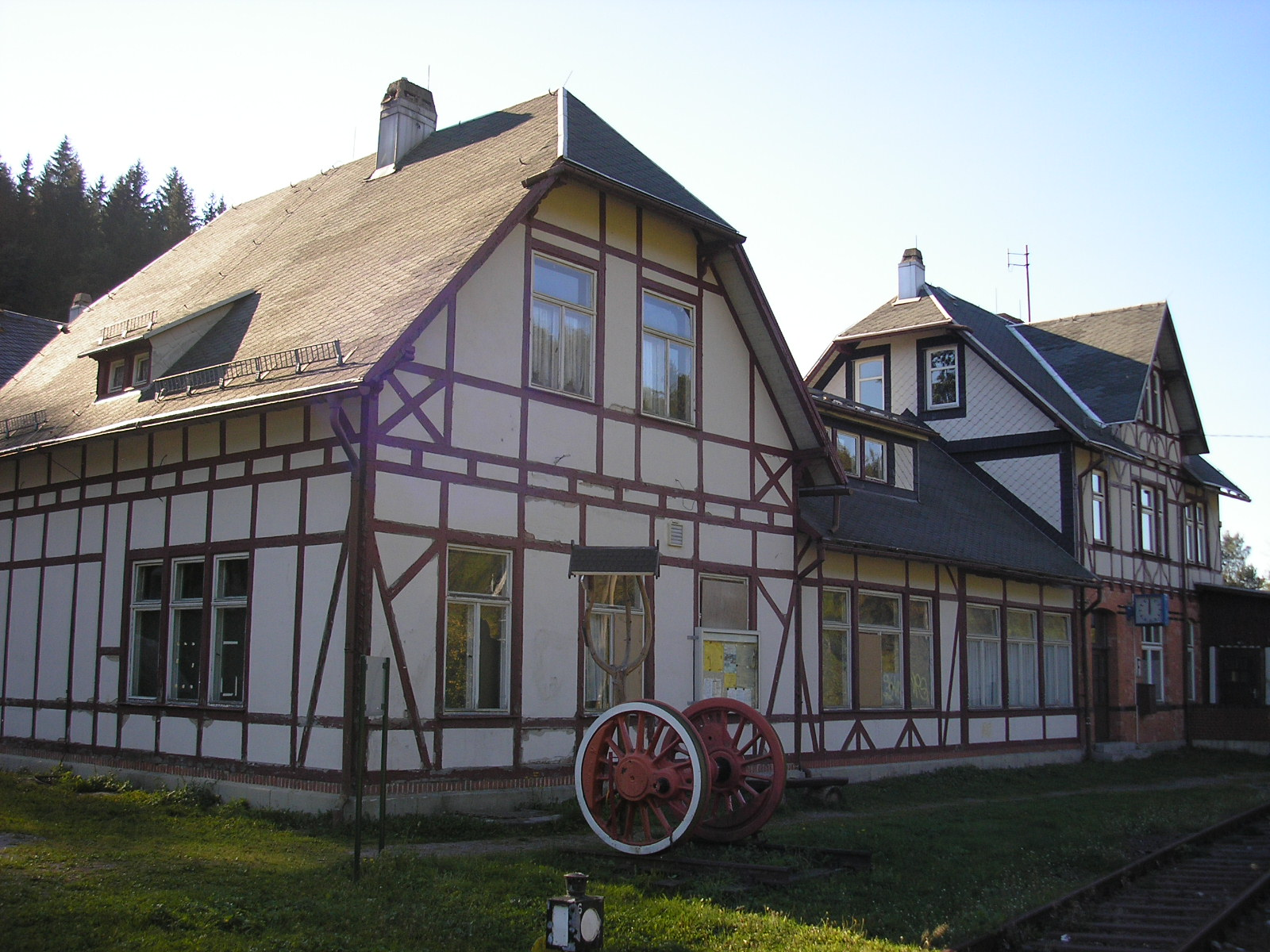
Stützerbach

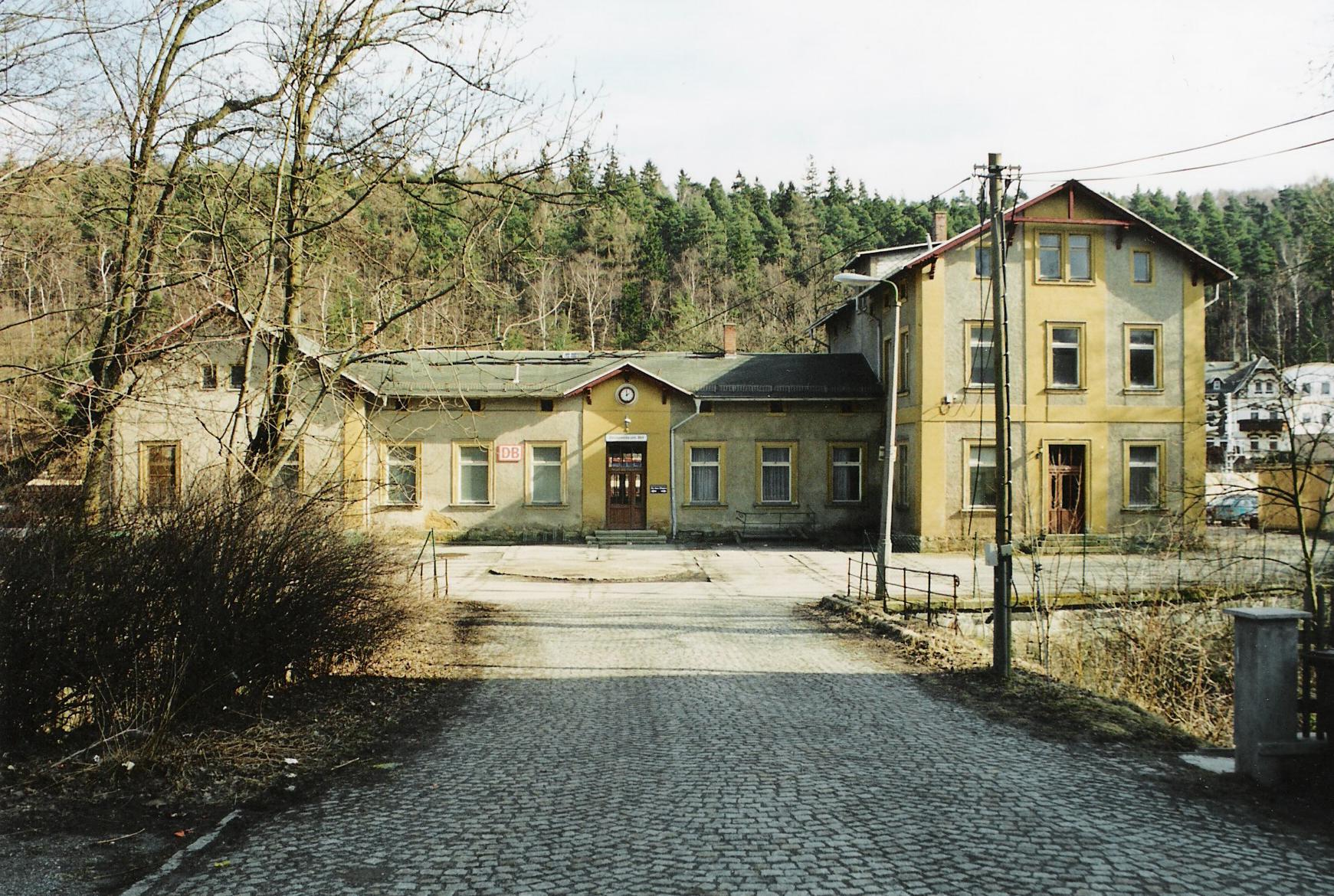
Zeulenroda lower station

The list is organised as follows:

- Number: this lists the last four digits of the International Station Number (Internationale Bahnhofsnummer, IBNR).
- Name: the current name of the station or halt.
- Category: The category shows the status at 1 January 2012 and only applies to stations operated by DB Station&Service AG.
- The next four columns show which types of train stop at the station. The abbreviations are those used by the DB AG but apply to similar train types of other operators:
- ICE = Intercity-Express
- IC = Intercity
- EC = Eurocity
- FLX = Flixtrain
- RE = Regionalexpress
- RB = Regionalbahn, Erfurter Bahn, Süd-Thüringen-Bahn, cantus and Harzer Schmalspurbahnen
- Line: this column gives the railway line on which the station is situated.

| Number | Station | Category 2011 | ICE | IC | RE | RB | Lines(s) |
|---|---|---|---|---|---|---|---|
| 0089 | Altenburg | 4 | | | RE | RB | Leipzig–Hof |
| 0114 | Altersbach | 7 | | | | RB | Wernshausen–Zella-Mehlis |
| 0263 | Ammern | 7 | | | | RB | Gotha–Leinefelde |
| 0166 | Apolda | 5 | | IC | | RB | Halle–Erfurt |
| 0172 | Arenshausen | 6 | | | RE | RB | Halle–Kassel |
| 0180 | Arnstadt Hauptbahnhof | 4 | | | RE | RB | Erfurt–Schweinfurt; Arnstadt–Saalfeld |
| 0181 | Arnstadt Süd | 6 | | | RE | RB | Erfurt–Schweinfurt |
| 0185 | Artern | 6 | | | RE | RB | Sangerhausen–Erfurt |
| 0208 | Auehütte | 7 | | | | RB | Wernshausen–Zella-Mehlis |
| 0214 | Auerstedt | 7 | | | | RB | Sömmerda–Großheringen |
| 0242 | Bachfeld | 7 | | | | RB | Meiningen–Sonneberg |
| 0249 | Bad Berka | 7 | | | | RB | Weimar–Kranichfeld |
| 7999 | Bad Berka Zeughausplatz | 7 | | | | RB | Weimar–Kranichfeld |
| 0256 | Bad Blankenburg (Thüringerw) | 6 | | | RE | RB | Arnstadt–Saalfeld |
| 0295 | Bad Köstritz | 6 | | | RE | RB | Leipzig–Gera |
| 0298 | Bad Langensalza | 4 | | | RE | RB | Gotha–Leinefelde; Erfurt–Bad Langensalza |
| 0333 | Bad Salzungen | 6 | | | RE* | RB | Eisenach–Meiningen |
| 0353 | Bad Sulza | 6 | | | | RB | Halle–Erfurt |
| 0354 | Bad Sulza Nord | 7 | | | | RB | Sömmerda–Großheringen |
| 0390 | Ballstädt (Kr Gotha) | 7 | | | | RB | Gotha–Leinefelde |
| 0487 | Benshausen | 7 | | | | RB | Wernshausen–Zella-Mehlis |
| 0496 | Berga (Elster) | 6 | | | RE* | RB | Gera–Plauen |
| 0580 | Bernterode | 6 | | | RE | RB | Halle–Kassel |
| 0604 | Beuren | 6 | | | RE | RB | Halle–Kassel |
| 0615 | Bibra | 7 | | | | RB | Erfurt–Schweinfurt |
| 0662 | Birkungen | 7 | | | | RB | Gotha–Leinefelde |
| 0694 | Blankenstein (Saale) | 6 | | | | RB | Saalfeld–Blankenstein |
| 0699 | Blechhammer (Thür) | 7 | | | | RB | Sonneberg–Neuhaus |
| 0702 | Bleicherode Ost | 5 | | | RE | RB | Halle–Kassel |
| 0741 | Bodenrode | 7 | | | RE | RB | Halle–Kassel |
| 0854 | Breitungen (Werra) | 6 | | | | RB | Eisenach–Meiningen |
| 0873 | Breternitz | 7 | | | | RB | Saalfeld–Bamberg; Saalfeld–Blankenstein |
| 0874 | Bretleben | 6 | | | | RB | Sangerhausen–Erfurt |
| 0958 | Bufleben | 7 | | | | RB | Gotha–Leinefelde |
| 1012 | Buttstädt | 6 | | | | RB | Sömmerda–Großheringen |
| 1026 | Camburg (Saale) | 6 | | | | RB | Naumburg–Saalfeld |
| 3432 | Crossen an der Elster | 7 | | | | RB | Leipzig–Gera |
| 7998 | Crossen Ort | 7 | | | RE | RB | Leipzig–Gera |
| 1101 | Dachrieden | 7 | | | | RB | Gotha–Leinefelde |
| 1102 | Dachwig | 7 | | | | RB | Erfurt–Bad Langensalza |
| 1210 | Dietzhausen | 7 | | | | RB | Erfurt–Schweinfurt |
| 1257 | Döllstädt | 6 | | | | RB | Erfurt–Bad Langensalza |
| 1276 | Dornburg (Saale) | 6 | | | | RB | Naumburg–Saalfeld |
| 1282 | Dörrberg | 7 | | | | RB | Erfurt–Schweinfurt |
| 1453 | Eckardtsleben | 7 | | | | RB | Gotha–Leinefelde |
| 1455 | Eckartsberga (Thür) | 6 | | | | RB | Sömmerda–Großheringen |
| 1467 | Effelder (Thür) | 7 | | | | RB | Meiningen–Sonneberg |
| 1528 | Eisenach | 3 | ICE | IC | RE* | RB | Erfurt–Bebra; Eisenach–Meiningen |
| 1529 | Eisenach Opelwerk | 6 | | | | RB | Erfurt–Bebra |
| 1530 | Eisenach West | 6 | | | | RB | Erfurt–Bebra |
| 1538 | Eisfeld | 6 | | | | RB | Meiningen–Eisfeld; Eisfeld–Sonneberg |
| 1547 | Elgersburg | 6 | | | | RB | Plaue–Ilmenau |
| 1553 | Ellrich | 6 | | | | RB | Nordhausen–Northeim |
| 1573 | Elxleben | 7 | | | | RB | Erfurt–Bad Langensalza |
| 1634 | Erfurt Hauptbahnhof | 2 | ICE | IC | RE | RB | Halle–Erfurt–Bebra; Erfurt–Schweinfurt; Erfurt–Bad Langensalza; Erfurt–Nordhausen; Sangerhausen–Erfurt |
| 1635 | Erfurt Nord | 5 | | | RE | RB | Erfurt–Nordhausen; Erfurt–Bad Langensalza |
| 1636 | Erfurt Ost | 6 | | | RE | RB | Sangerhausen–Erfurt |
| 1637 | Erfurt-Bischleben | 5 | | | RE | RB | Erfurt–Bebra; Erfurt–Schweinfurt |
| 1638 | Erfurt-Gispersleben | 6 | | | RE | RB | Erfurt–Nordhausen; Erfurt–Bad Langensalza |
| 1663 | Ernstthal am Rennsteig | 7 | | | | RB | Sonneberg–Neuhaus |
| 1723 | Ettenhausen | 7 | | | | RB | Eisenach–Meiningen |
| 1729 | Etzleben | 7 | | | RE | RB | Sangerhausen–Erfurt |
| 1839 | Förtha (Kr Eisenach) | 6 | | | | RB | Eisenach–Meiningen |
| 1902 | Freienorla | 7 | | | | RB | Orlamünde–Pößneck |
| 1940 | Friedrichroda | 6 | | | | RB | Fröttstädt–Friedrichroda |
| 1972 | Fröttstädt | 6 | | | | RB | Erfurt–Bebra; Fröttstädt–Friedrichroda |
| 2006 | Gangloffsömmern | 7 | | | RE | RB | Erfurt–Nordhausen |
| 2027 | Gebra (Hainleite) | 6 | | | | RB | Halle–Kassel |
| 2030 | Gehlberg | 6 | | | RE | RB | Erfurt–Schweinfurt |
| 2073 | Gera Hauptbahnhof | 3 | | | RE | RB | Weimar–Gera; Leipzig–Gera–Saalfeld; Gera–Gößnitz; Gera–Plauen; Gera–Mehltheuer |
| 2074 | Gera Ost | 6 | | | | RB | Gera–Plauen |
| 2075 | Gera Süd | 5 | | | RE | RB | Gera–Saalfeld; Gera–Gößnitz; Gera–Plauen; Gera–Mehltheuer |
| 2077 | Gera-Langenberg | 7 | | | | RB | Leipzig–Gera |
| 2078 | Gera-Liebschwitz | 6 | | | | RB | Gera–Plauen |
| 2081 | Gera-Zwötzen | 7 | | | RE | RB | Gera–Saalfeld; Gera–Mehltheuer |
| 2082 | Geraberg | 6 | | | | RB | Plaue–Ilmenau |
| 2105 | Gerstungen | 6 | | | | RB | Erfurt–Bebra |
| 2149 | Glückauf | 7 | | | RE | RB | Erfurt–Nordhausen |
| 2196 | Görsbach | 6 | | | RE | RB | Halle–Kassel |
| 2207 | Gößnitz | 4 | | | RE | RB | Leipzig–Hof; Gera–Gößnitz; Gößnitz–Chemnitz |
| 2209 | Gotha | 3 | ICE | IC | RE | RB | Erfurt–Bebra; Gotha–Leinefelde |
| 2210 | Gotha Ost | 6 | | | | RB | Gotha–Leinefelde |
| 2233 | Gräfenroda | 6 | | | RE | RB | Erfurt–Schweinfurt |
| 2237 | Gräfentonna | 7 | | | | RB | Erfurt–Bad Langensalza |
| 2254 | Greiz | 6 | | | RE* | RB | Gera–Plauen |
| 2256 | Greiz-Dölau | 6 | | | | RB | Gera–Plauen |
| 2261 | Greußen | 6 | | | RE | RB | Erfurt–Nordhausen |
| 2270 | Griefstedt | 7 | | | RE | RB | Sangerhausen–Erfurt |
| 2278 | Grimmenthal | 6 | | | RE | RB | Erfurt–Schweinfurt; Meiningen–Sonneberg |
| 2338 | Großengottern | 6 | | | RE | RB | Gotha–Leinefelde |
| 2343 | Großfurra | 6 | | | RE | RB | Erfurt–Nordhausen |
| 2347 | Großheringen | 5 | | | | RB | Halle–Erfurt; Naumburg–Saalfeld; Sömmerda–Großheringen |
| 2356 | Großneuhausen | 7 | | | | RB | Sömmerda–Großheringen |
| 2361 | Großrudestedt | 6 | | | RE | RB | Sangerhausen–Erfurt |
| 2365 | Großschwabhausen | 6 | | | RE | RB | Weimar–Gera |
| 2439 | Guthmannshausen | 7 | | | | RB | Sömmerda–Großheringen |
| 2444 | Haarhausen | 6 | | | | RB | Erfurt–Schweinfurt |
| 2561 | Harra | 7 | | | | RB | Saalfeld–Blankenstein |
| 2562 | Harra Nord | 7 | | | | RB | Saalfeld–Blankenstein |
| 2563 | Harras (Thür) | 6 | | | | RB | Meiningen–Sonneberg |
| 2603 | Hausen | 7 | | | | RB | Halle–Kassel |
| 2654 | Heilbad Heiligenstadt | 4 | | | RE | RB | Halle–Kassel |
| 2671 | Heldrungen | 7 | | | RE | RB | Sangerhausen–Erfurt |
| 2712 | Heringen (Helme) | 6 | | | RE | RB | Halle–Kassel |
| 2721 | Hermsdorf-Klosterlausnitz | 5 | | | RE | RB | Weimar–Gera |
| 2750 | Hetschburg | 7 | | | | RB | Weimar–Kranichfeld |
| 2762 | Hildburghausen | 6 | | | | RB | Meiningen–Sonneberg |
| 2815 | Hockeroda | 6 | | | | RB | Saalfeld–Bamberg; Saalfeld–Blankenstein |
| 2840 | Hohenebra Ort | 7 | | | RE | RB | Erfurt–Nordhausen |
| 2850 | Hohenleuben | 6 | | | RE | RB | Gera–Mehltheuer |
| 2880 | Holzdorf (b Weimar) | 6 | | | | RB | Weimar–Kranichfeld |
| 2897 | Hopfgarten (Kr Weimar) | 6 | | | | RB | Halle–Erfurt |
| 2920 | Hörschel | 6 | | | | RB | Erfurt–Bebra |
| 7962 | Hörselgau | 7 | | | | RB | Fröttstädt–Friedrichroda |
| 2954 | Hüttengrund | 7 | | | | RB | Sonneberg–Neuhaus |
| 2976 | Ilmenau | 6 | | | | RB | Plaue–Ilmenau |
| 2978 | Ilmenau-Pörlitzer Höhe | 6 | | | | RB | Plaue–Ilmenau |
| 2979 | Ilmenau-Roda | 6 | | | | RB | Plaue–Ilmenau |
| 2981 | Immelborn | 6 | | | RE* | RB | Eisenach–Meiningen |
| 3043 | Jena Paradies | 3 | ICE | IC | RE | RB | Naumburg–Saalfeld |
| 3044 | Jena Saalbf | 6 | | | RE | RB | Naumburg–Saalfeld |
| 3045 | Jena West | 3 | | | RE | RB | Weimar–Gera |
| 2201 | Jena-Göschwitz | 3 | | | RE | RB | Naumburg–Saalfeld; Weimar–Gera |
| 3046 | Jena-Zwätzen | 6 | | | | RB | Naumburg–Saalfeld |
| 3080 | Kahla (Thür) | 6 | | | RE | RB | Naumburg–Saalfeld |
| 3144 | Kaulsdorf (Saale) | 6 | | | RE | RB | Saalfeld–Bamberg; Saalfeld–Blankenstein |
| 3171 | Kiebitzhöhe | 7 | | | | RB | Sömmerda–Großheringen |
| 3249 | Kleinfurra | 6 | | | RE | RB | Erfurt–Nordhausen |
| 3315 | Kölleda | 6 | | | | RB | Sömmerda–Großheringen |
| 3361 | Könitz (Thür) | 7 | | | RE | RB | Gera–Saalfeld |
| 3392 | Kraftsdorf | 7 | | | | RB | Weimar–Gera |
| 3397 | Kranichfeld | 7 | | | | RB | Weimar–Kranichfeld |
| 3426 | Krölpa-Ranis | 6 | | | RE | RB | Gera–Saalfeld |
| 3454 | Kühnhausen | 6 | | | RE | RB | Erfurt–Nordhausen; Erfurt–Bad Langensalza |
| 3547 | Langenorla Ost | 7 | | | | RB | Orlamünde–Pößneck |
| 3548 | Langenorla West | 7 | | | | RB | Orlamünde–Pößneck |
| 3595 | Lauscha (Thür) | 7 | | | | RB | Sonneberg–Neuhaus |
| 3612 | Legefeld | 7 | | | | RB | Weimar–Kranichfeld |
| 3615 | Lehndorf (Kr Altenburg) | 6 | | | RE | RB | Leipzig–Hof; Gera–Gößnitz |
| 3625 | Leinefelde | 3 | | IC | RE | RB | Halle–Kassel; Gotha–Leinefelde |
| 3676 | Leubingen | 6 | | | RE | RB | Sangerhausen–Erfurt |
| 3683 | Leutenberg | 6 | | | | RB | Saalfeld–Blankenstein |
| 3706 | Lichtentanne (Thür) | 7 | | | | RB | Saalfeld–Blankenstein |
| 3753 | Lobenstein (Thür) | 6 | | | | RB | Saalfeld–Blankenstein |
| 3775 | Loitsch-Hohenleuben | 6 | | | | RB | Gera–Mehltheuer |
| 3966 | Marksuhl | 6 | | | | RB | Eisenach–Meiningen |
| 3985 | Marlishausen | 7 | | | RE | RB | Arnstadt–Saalfeld |
| 3991 | Martinroda | 6 | | | | RB | Plaue–Ilmenau |
| 4013 | Mechterstädt | 6 | | | | RB | Erfurt–Bebra |
| 4033 | Meiningen | 4 | | | RE | RB | Eisenach–Meiningen–Sonneberg; Meiningen–Schweinfurt; Erfurt–Meiningen |
| 4048 | Mellingen (Thür) | 6 | | | RE | RB | Weimar–Gera |
| 4056 | Mengersgereuth-Hämmern | 7 | | | | RB | Meiningen–Sonneberg |
| 4057 | Mengersgereuth-Hämmern Ost | 7 | | | | RB | Meiningen–Sonneberg |
| 4132 | Mittelschmalkalden | 7 | | | | RB | Wernshausen–Zella-Mehlis |
| 4207 | Mühlhausen (Thür) | 4 | | | RE | RB | Gotha–Leinefelde |
| 4230 | München (b Bad Berka) | 7 | | | | RB | Weimar–Kranichfeld |
| 4372 | Neudietendorf | 4 | | | RE | RB | Erfurt–Bebra; Erfurt–Schweinfurt |
| 4375 | Neue Schenke | 6 | | | | RB | Weimar–Gera |
| 7160 | Neuhaus-Igelshieb | 7 | | | | RB | Sonneberg–Neuhaus |
| 4418 | Neumühle (Elster) | 6 | | | | RB | Gera–Plauen |
| 4423 | Neunhofen | 7 | | | | RB | Gera–Saalfeld |
| 4449 | Neustadt (Orla) | 6 | | | RE | RB | Gera–Saalfeld |
| 4516 | Niederpöllnitz | 6 | | | RE | RB | Gera–Saalfeld |
| 4519 | Niedersachswerfen | 6 | | | | RB | Nordhausen–Northeim |
| 4525 | Niederschmalkalden | 7 | | | | RB | Wernshausen–Zella-Mehlis |
| 4529 | Niederspier | 7 | | | RE | RB | Erfurt–Nordhausen |
| 4533 | Niedertreba | 6 | | | | RB | Halle–Erfurt |
| 4540 | Niederwillingen | 7 | | | RE | RB | Arnstadt–Saalfeld |
| 4561 | Nöbdenitz | 6 | | | RE | – | Gera–Gößnitz |
| 4564 | Nohra (b Weimar) | 7 | | | | RB | Weimar–Kranichfeld |
| 4565 | Nohra (Wipper) | 6 | | | | RB | Halle–Kassel |
| 4576 | Nordhausen | 3 | | IC | RE | RB | Halle–Kassel; Erfurt–Nordhausen; Nordhausen–Northeim |
| 4577 | Nordhausen-Salza | 7 | | | | RB | Nordhausen–Northeim |
| 4644 | Obergrunstedt | 7 | | | | RB | Weimar–Kranichfeld |
| 4652 | Oberhof (Thür) | 6 | | | RE | RB | Erfurt–Schweinfurt |
| 4660 | Oberlauscha | 7 | | | | RB | Sonneberg–Neuhaus |
| 4685 | Oberrohn | 6 | | | | RB | Eisenach–Meiningen |
| 4706 | Oberweimar | 7 | | | RE | RB | Weimar–Gera |
| 4775 | Oppurg | 7 | | | RE | RB | Gera–Saalfeld |
| 4779 | Orlamünde | 6 | | | RE | RB | Naumburg–Saalfeld; Orlamünde–Pößneck |
| 4788 | Oßmannstedt | 6 | | | | RB | Halle–Erfurt |
| 4860 | Papiermühle (Kr Stadtroda) | 6 | | | | RB | Weimar–Gera |
| 4877 | Paulinzella | 7 | | | | RB | Arnstadt–Saalfeld |
| 4954 | Plaue (Thür) | 5 | | | RE | RB | Erfurt–Schweinfurt; Plaue–Ilmenau |
| 4990 | Ponitz | 6 | | | RE | RB | Leipzig–Hof |
| 4997 | Porstendorf | 6 | | | | RB | Naumburg–Saalfeld |
| 5007 | Pößneck ob Bf | 6 | | | RE | RB | Gera–Saalfeld |
| 5008 | Pößneck unt Bf | 6 | | | | RB | Orlamünde–Pößneck |
| 5045 | Probstzella | 5 | | | RE | RB | Saalfeld–Bamberg |
| 5144 | Rauenstein (Thür) | 7 | | | | RB | Meiningen–Sonneberg |
| 5202 | Reinhardsbrunn-Friedrichsroda | 6 | | | | RB | Fröttstädt–Friedrichsroda |
| 5206 | Reinsdorf (b Artern) | 7 | | | | RB | Sangerhausen–Erfurt |
| 5230 | Rentwertshausen | 6 | | | RE | RB | Erfurt–Schweinfurt |
| 5237 | Reurieth | 6 | | | | RB | Meiningen–Sonneberg |
| 5285 | Ringleben-Gebesee | 6 | | | RE | RB | Erfurt–Nordhausen |
| 5292 | Ritschenhausen | 6 | | | | RB | Erfurt–Ritschenhausen; Meiningen–Schweinfurt |
| 5317 | Rohr (Thür) | 7 | | | RE | RB | Erfurt–Schweinfurt |
| 5336 | Ronneburg (Thür) | 6 | | | RE | – | Gera–Gößnitz |
| 5395 | Rothenstein (Saale) | 6 | | | RE | RB | Naumburg–Saalfeld |
| 5398 | Rottenbach | 5 | | | RE | RB | Arnstadt–Saalfeld; Rottenbach–Katzhütte |
| 5418 | Rudolstadt (Thür) | 4 | | | RE | RB | Naumburg–Saalfeld |
| 5419 | Rudolstadt-Schwarza | 6 | | | RE | RB | Naumburg–Saalfeld |
| 5450 | Saalfeld (Saale) | 3 | ICE | IC | RE | RB | Naumburg–Saalfeld; Saalfeld–Bamberg; Gera–Saalfeld; Arnstadt–Saalfeld; Saalfeld–Blankenstein |
| 5516 | Sättelstädt | 6 | | | | RB | Erfurt–Bebra |
| 5536 | Schalkau | 7 | | | | RB | Meiningen–Sonneberg |
| 8054 | Schalkau-Mitte | 7 | | | | RB | Meiningen–Sonneberg |
| 5603 | Schmalkalden | 6 | | | RE* | RB | Wernshausen–Zella-Mehlis |
| 5605 | Schmalkalden Fachhochschule | 6 | | | | RB | Wernshausen–Zella-Mehlis |
| 5618 | Schmölln (Thür) | 6 | | | RE | – | Gera–Gößnitz |
| 5636 | Schönau (Hörsel) | 6 | | | | RB | Erfurt–Bebra |
| 5671 | Schönstedt | 7 | | | | RB | Gotha–Leinefelde |
| 5692 | Schüptitz | 7 | | | | RB | Gera–Mehltheuer |
| 5709 | Schwallungen | 6 | | | | RB | Eisenach–Meiningen |
| 5777 | Seebach (Kr Mühlhausen) | 7 | | | | RB | Gotha–Leinefelde |
| 5781 | Seebergen | 6 | | | RE | RB | Erfurt–Bebra; Gotha–Leinefelde |
| 5820 | Seltendorf | 7 | | | | RB | Meiningen–Sonneberg |
| 5855 | Silberhausen | 6 | | | RE | RB | Gotha–Leinefelde |
| 5866 | Singen (Thür) | 7 | | | RE | RB | Arnstadt–Saalfeld |
| 5888 | Sollstedt | 6 | | | RE | RB | Halle–Kassel |
| 5895 | Sömmerda | 4 | | | RE | RB | Sangerhausen–Erfurt; Sömmerda–Großheringen |
| 5898 | Sondershausen | 6 | | | RE | RB | Erfurt–Nordhausen |
| 5904 | Sonneberg (Thür) Hbf | 4 | | | RE | RB | Coburg–Sonneberg; Meiningen–Sonneberg; Sonneberg–Neuhaus |
| 5901 | Sonneberg (Thür) Nord | 7 | | | | RB | Sonneberg–Neuhaus |
| 5902 | Sonneberg (Thür) Ost | 7 | | | | RB | Sonneberg–Neuhaus |
| 5903 | Sonneberg (Thür) West | 7 | | | | RB | Meiningen–Sonneberg |
| 5956 | Stadtilm | 6 | | | RE | RB | Arnstadt–Saalfeld |
| 5960 | Stadtroda | 6 | | | RE | RB | Weimar–Gera |
| 5983 | Steinach (Thür) | 7 | | | | RB | Sonneberg–Neuhaus |
| 6867 | Steinach Süd | 7 | | | | RB | Sonneberg–Neuhaus |
| 5990 | Steinbach-Hallenberg | 6 | | | RE* | RB | Wernshausen–Zella-Mehlis |
| 6047 | Stotternheim | 6 | | | RE | RB | Sangerhausen–Erfurt |
| 6061 | Straußfurt | 6 | | | RE | RB | Erfurt–Nordhausen; Straußfurt–Großheringen |
| 6099 | Suhl | 5 | | | RE | RB | Erfurt–Schweinfurt |
| 6101 | Suhl-Heinrichs | 7 | | | | RB | Erfurt–Schweinfurt |
| 6120 | Sülzenbrücken | 6 | | | | RB | Erfurt–Schweinfurt |
| 6145 | Tannroda | 7 | | | | RB | Weimar–Kranichfeld |
| 6195 | Themar | 6 | | | | RB | Meiningen–Sonneberg |
| 6227 | Töppeln | 7 | | | | RB | Weimar–Gera |
| 6243 | Treben-Lehma | 6 | | | RE | RB | Leipzig–Hof |
| 6262 | Triebes | 6 | | | RE | RB | Gera–Mehltheuer |
| 6269 | Triptis | 6 | | | RE | RB | Gera–Saalfeld |
| 6275 | Tromsdorf | 7 | | | | RB | Sömmerda–Großheringen |
| 6306 | Uder | 6 | | | RE | RB | Halle–Kassel |
| 6317 | Uhlstädt | 6 | | | RE | RB | Naumburg–Saalfeld |
| 6356 | Unterlemnitz | 7 | | | | RB | Saalfeld–Unterlemnitz; Unterlemnitz–Blankenstein |
| 6358 | Unterloquitz | 7 | | | | RB | Saalfeld–Bamberg |
| 6360 | Untermaßfeld | 6 | | | | RB | Meiningen–Sonneberg; Erfurt–Meiningen |
| 6368 | Unterwellenborn | 6 | | | RE | RB | Gera–Saalfeld |
| 6387 | Vachdorf | 6 | | | | RB | Meiningen–Sonneberg |
| 6402 | Veilsdorf | 6 | | | | RB | Meiningen–Sonneberg |
| 6414 | Viernau | 6 | | | | RB | Wernshausen–Zella-Mehlis |
| 6416 | Vieselbach | 6 | | | | RB | Halle–Erfurt |
| 6443 | Voigtstedt | 6 | | | RE | RB | Sangerhausen–Erfurt |
| 6504 | Walldorf (Werra) | 6 | | | | RB | Eisenach–Meiningen |
| 6518 | Walschleben | 7 | | | RE | RB | Erfurt–Nordhausen |
| 6522 | Waltershausen | 6 | | | | RB | Fröttstädt–Friedrichroda |
| 6523 | Waltershausen-Schnepfenthal | 7 | | | | RB | Fröttstädt–Friedrichroda |
| 6526 | Wandersleben | 6 | | | RE | RB | Erfurt–Bebra |
| 6563 | Wasserthaleben | 7 | | | RE | RB | Erfurt–Nordhausen |
| 6566 | Wasungen | 6 | | | | RB | Eisenach–Meiningen |
| 6595 | Weida | 5 | | | RE | RB | Gera–Saalfeld; Gera–Mehltheuer |
| 6596 | Weida Altstadt | 7 | | | | RB | Gera–Mehltheuer |
| 6304 | Weida Mitte | 7 | | | | RB | Gera–Mehltheuer |
| 6617 | Weimar | 3 | ICE | IC | RE | RB | Halle–Erfurt; Weimar–Gera; Weimar–Kranichfeld |
| 6619 | Weimar Berkaer Bf | 6 | | | | RB | Weimar–Kranichfeld |
| 7110 | Weimar West | 7 | | | | RB | Weimar–Kranichfeld |
| 6696 | Wernshausen | 5 | | | RE* | RB | Eisenach–Meiningen; Wernshausen–Zella-Mehlis |
| 6700 | Werther | 6 | | | RE | RB | Halle–Kassel; Erfurt–Nordhausen |
| 6797 | Wingerode | 6 | | | RE | RB | Halle–Kassel |
| 6812 | Wipperdorf | 6 | | | | RB | Halle–Kassel |
| 6844 | Woffleben | 7 | | | | RB | Nordhausen–Northeim |
| 6854 | Wölfershausen | 7 | | | | RB | Erfurt–Schweinfurt |
| 7997 | Wolfsgefärth | 7 | | | | RB | Gera–Saalfeld; Gera–Mehltheuer |
| 6870 | Wolkramshausen | 5 | | | RE | RB | Halle–Kassel; Erfurt–Nordhausen |
| 6908 | Wünschendorf (Elster) | 6 | | | RE* | RB | Gera–Plauen |
| 6909 | Wünschendorf (Elster) Nord | 6 | | | | RB | Gera–Plauen |
| 6944 | Wurzbach (Thür) | 6 | | | | RB | Saalfeld–Blankenstein |
| 6963 | Wutha | 6 | | | | RB | Erfurt–Bebra |
| 6992 | Zella-Mehlis | 5 | | | RE | RB | Erfurt–Schweinfurt; Wernshausen–Zella-Mehlis |
| 6993 | Zella-Mehlis West | 7 | | | | RB | Wernshausen–Zella-Mehlis |
| 7009 | Zeulenroda unt Bf | 6 | | | RE | RB | Gera–Mehltheuer |
| 7011 | Zeutsch | 6 | | | RE | RB | Naumburg–Saalfeld |

* Only nostalgic excursions on some weekends

== Stations not operated by DB ==
| Station | Operator | Lines | Comments |
|---|---|---|---|
| Eisfelder Talmühle | HSB | Harz Railway, Selke Valley Railway | Separation station |
| Ilfeld | HSB | Harz Railway | Station |
| Ilfeld Bad | HSB | Harz Railway | Operations halt |
| Ilfeld Neanderklinik | HSB | Harz Railway | Halt |
| Ilfeld Schreiberwiese | HSB | Harz Railway | Operations halt |
| Neuhaus am Rennweg | ThE | Sonneberg–Probstzella railway | Terminus |
| Niedersachswerfen Ilfelder Straße | HSB | Harz Railway | Operations halt |
| Niedersachswerfen Herkulesmarkt | HSB | Harz Railway | Operations halt |
| Niedersachswerfen Ost | HSB | Harz Railway | Station |
| Netzkater | HSB | Harz Railway | Halt |
| Nordhausen Altentor | HSB | Harz Railway | Halt |
| Nordhausen Hesseröder Straße | HSB | Harz Railway | Operations halt |
| Nordhausen Krimderode | HSB | Harz Railway | Station |
| Nordhausen Nord | HSB | Harz Railway | Terminus |
| Nordhausen Ricarda-Huch-Straße | HSB | Harz Railway | Operations halt |
| Nordhausen Schurzfell | HSB | Harz Railway | Operations halt |
| Olbersleben-Ellersleben | ThE | Pfefferminz Railway | Station |
| Sophienhof | HSB | Harz Railway | Operations halt |
| Tiefenbachmühle | HSB | Harz Railway | Operations halt |

== Railway hubs ==
All stations where at least two routes meet or met (junctions of main lines are in bold):

1. Altenburg (Leipzig–Hof and Altenburg–Zeitz (closed), Altenburg–Langenleuba-Oberhain (closed))
2. **Arnstadt** (Erfurt–Schweinfurt, Arnstadt–Saalfeld and Arnstadt–Ichtershausen (closed))
3. Artern (Sangerhausen–Erfurt and Artern–Berga-Kelbra (closed))
4. Bad Berka (Weimar–Kranichfeld and Bad Berka–Blankenhain (closed))
5. Bad Blankenburg (Arnstadt–Saalfeld and Schwarza–Bad Blankenburg (closed))
6. Bad Langensalza (Gotha–Leinefelde, Erfurt–Bad Langensalza and Bad Langensalza–Haussömmern (closed))
7. Bad Salzungen (Eisenach–Meiningen and Bad Salzungen–Vacha (currently out of service))
8. Ballstädt (Gotha–Leinefelde and Ballstädt–Straußfurt (closed))
9. Bleicherode (Halle–Kassel and Bleicherode–Herzberg (closed))
10. Bretleben (Erfurt–Sangerhausen and Sondershausen–Bretleben (closed))
11. Bufleben (Gotha–Leinefelde and Bufleben–Großenbehringen (closed))
12. Buttstädt (Straussfurt–Grossheringen and Buttstädt–Rastenberg (closed))
13. Camburg (Naumburg–Saalfeld and Zeitz–Camburg (closed))
14. Crossen an der Elster (Leipzig–Gera and Crossen–Porstendorf (closed))
15. Döllstädt (Erfurt–Bad Langensalza and Ballstädt–Straußfurt (closed))
16. Dorndorf (Bad Salzungen–Vacha (still out of service) and Dorndorf–Kaltennordheim (closed))
17. Ebeleben (Mühlhausen–Sondershausen (only goods traffic from Sondershausen) and Greussen–Keula (closed))
18. **Eisenach** (Erfurt–Eisenach–Bebra and Eisenach–Meiningen)
19. Eisfeld (Meiningen–Eisfeld–Coburg (Eisfeld–Coburg closed), Eisfeld–Sonneberg and Eisfeld–Schönbrunn (closed))
20. Eisfelder Talmühle (Nordhausen−Wernigerode and Eisfelder Talmühle–Stiege)
21. **Erfurt** (Halle–Erfurt–Eisenach, Erfurt–Nordhausen, Sangerhausen–Erfurt and Erfurt–Nottleben (closed))
22. Ernstthal am Rennsteig (Sonneberg–Probstzella (closed towards Probstzella) and branch to Neuhaus am Rennweg)
23. Esperstedt (Sondershausen–Bretleben and Esperstedt–Oldisleben (closed))
24. Fröttstädt (Erfurt–Eisenach and Fröttstädt–Friedrichroda–Georgenthal)
25. Georgenthal (Gotha–Gräfenroda, Fröttstädt–Friedrichroda–Georgenthal (closed) and Georgenthal–Tambach-Dietharz (closed))
26. **Gera** (Leipzig–Gera–Saalfeld, Weimar–Gera, Gera–Plauen, Gera–Gößnitz and Gera–Wuitz-Mumsdorf (closed))
27. Gerstungen (Eisenach–Bebra and Gerstungen–Vacha (only goods traffic))
28. **Göschwitz** (Naumburg–Saalfeld and Weimar–Gera)
29. **Gößnitz** (Leipzig–Hof, Gera–Gößnitz and Glauchau–Gößnitz railway)
30. **Gotha** (Erfurt–Eisenach, Gotha–Leinefelde, Gotha–Tabarz and Gotha–Gräfenroda)
31. Gräfenroda (Erfurt–Schweinfurt and Gotha–Gräfenroda)
32. Gräfentonna (Erfurt–Bad Langensalza and Ballstädt–Straußfurt (closed))
33. Greiz (Gera–Plauen and Neumark–Greiz (closed))
34. Greussen (Erfurt–Nordhausen and Greussen–Keula (closed))
35. **Grimmenthal** (Meiningen–Eisfeld and Erfurt–Schweinfurt)
36. **Grossheringen** (Halle–Erfurt, Grossheringen–Saalfeld and Straussfurt–Grossheringen)
37. Grossrudestedt (Erfurt–Sangerhausen and Weimar–Grossrudestedt (closed))
38. Heiligenstadt (Halle–Kassel and Heiligenstadt–Eschwege (closed))
39. Hildburghausen (Meiningen–Eisfeld and Hildburghausen–Lindenau-Friedrichshall (closed))
40. Hockeroda (Saalfeld–Bamberg and Hockeroda–Bad Lobenstein)
41. Hohenebra (Erfurt–Nordhausen and Hohenebra–Mühlhausen (only goods traffic))
42. Ilmenau (Plaue–Ilmenau–Themar and Ilmenau–Großbreitenbach (closed))
43. Immelborn (Eisenach–Meiningen and Immelborn–Steinbach (closed))
44. Köditzberg (Rottenbach–Katzhütte and branch to Königsee (closed))
45. Kölleda (Straußfurt–Großheringen and Kölleda–Laucha (closed))
46. Kühnhausen (Erfurt–Nordhausen and (Erfurt)–Kühnhausen–Bad Langensalza)
47. **Leinefelde** (Halle–Kassel, Gotha–Leinefelde, Leinefelde–Eschwege (closed) and Leinefelde–Wulften (closed))
48. **Meiningen** (Eisenach–Lichtenfels, Meiningen–Schweinfurt and Meiningen–Erfurt)
49. Meuselwitz (Altenburg–Zeitz (closed), Meuselwitz–Ronneburg (closed) and Meuselwitz–Lucka (closed))
50. Mühlhausen (Gotha–Leinefelde, Mühlhausen–Treffurt–Eschwege (closed) and Mühlhausen–Ebeleben (closed))
51. **Neudietendorf** (Erfurt–Eisenach and (Erfurt)–Neudietendorf–Schweinfurt)
52. Niederpöllnitz (Leipzig–Gera–Saalfeld and Niederpöllnitz-Münchenbernsdorf (closed))
53. **Nordhausen** (Halle–Kassel and Nordhausen–Northeim as well as Nordhausen–Wernigerode)
54. Obstfelderschmiede (Rottenbach–Katzhütte and Oberweißbacher Mountain Railway)
55. Oppurg (Gera–Saalfeld and Oppurg–Pössneck–Orlamünde (closed as far as Pössneck))
56. Orlamünde (Naumburg–Saalfeld and Orlamünde–Pössneck)
57. Plaue (Erfurt–Schweinfurt and Plaue–Ilmenau–Themar)
58. Porstendorf (Naumburg–Saalfeld and Crossen–Porstendorf (closed))
59. Probstzella (Saalfeld–Bamberg and Sonneberg–Probstzella (closed))
60. Reinsdorf (Sangerhausen–Erfurt and Reinsdorf–Naumburg (closed))
61. Reinhardsbrunn
62. Rennsteig (Plaue–Ilmenau–Themar and Rennsteig–Frauenwald (closed))
63. Rentwertshausen (Erfurt–Schweinfurt and Rentwertshausen–Römhild (closed))
64. Ritschenhausen (Ritschenhausen–Meiningen and Erfurt–Schweinfurt)
65. Ronneburg (Gera–Gößnitz and Meuselwitz–Ronneburg (closed))
66. Rottenbach (Arnstadt–Saalfeld and Rottenbach–Katzhütte)
67. Rudolstadt-Schwarza (Naumburg–Saalfeld and Schwarza–Bad Blankenburg (closed))
68. **Saalfeld** (Naumburg–Saalfeld–Bamberg, Gera–Saalfeld and Arnstadt–Saalfeld)
69. Schleusingen (Plaue–Ilmenau–Themar and Suhl–Schleusingen (closed))
70. Schmalkalden (Wernshausen–Zella-Mehlis and Schmalkalden–Brotterode (closed))
71. Seelingstädt
72. Silberhausen (Gotha–Leinefelde, Leinefelde–Eschwege (closed) and Silberhausen–Hüpstedt (closed))
73. Sondershausen (Erfurt–Nordhausen and Sondershausen–Bretleben (closed))
74. Sonneberg (Coburg–Sonneberg, Eisfeld–Sonneberg, Sonneberg–Neuhaus–Probstzella and Sonneberg–Kronach (closed))
75. Straussfurt (Erfurt–Nordhausen, Straussfurt–Grossheringen and Ballstädt–Straussfurt (closed))
76. Suhl (Erfurt–Schweinfurt and Suhl–Schleusingen (closed))
77. Themar (Meiningen–Eisfeld and Plaue–Ilmenau–Themar)
78. Treffurt (Eschwege–Eisenach (closed) and Mühlhausen–Treffurt (closed))
79. Triptis (Gera–Saalfeld and Triptis–Bad Lobenstein (closed))
80. Unterlemnitz (Hockeroda–Bad Lobenstein and Triptis–Unterlemnitz (closed))
81. Vacha (Bad Salzungen–Vacha (currently out of service), Vacha–Tann (closed) and Gerstungen–Vacha (closed))
82. Waltershausen
83. Wartha (Halle–Bebra and Wartha-Treffurt)
84. Weida (Gera–Saalfeld and Werdau–Weida–Mehltheuer (closed to Werdau))
85. **Weimar** (Halle–Erfurt, Weimar–Gera, Weimar–Kranichfeld, Weimar–Buchenwald (closed) and Weimar–Großrudestedt (closed))
86. Wenigentaft-Mansbach (Bad Salzungen–Tann (closed), Hünfeld–Wenigentaft-Mansbach (closed) and Wenigentaft-Mansbach–Oechsen (closed))
87. Wernshausen (Eisenach–Meiningen, Wernshausen–Zella-Mehlis and Wernshausen–Trusetal (closed))
88. **Wolkramshausen** (Halle–Kassel and (Nordhausen)–Wolkramshausen–Erfurt)
89. Wünschendorf (Gera–Plauen and Werdau–Weida (closed))
90. Wutha (Erfurt–Eisenach and Wutha–Ruhla (closed))
91. Zella-Mehlis (Erfurt–Schweinfurt and Wernshausen–Zella-Mehlis)
92. Zeulenroda lower station (Weida–Mehltheuer and branch to Zeulenroda upper station (closed))

== See also ==
- German station categories
- Railway station types of Germany
- List of scheduled railway routes in Germany
