= Fröttstädt station =

Railway station in Fröttstädt, Germany

Fröttstädt
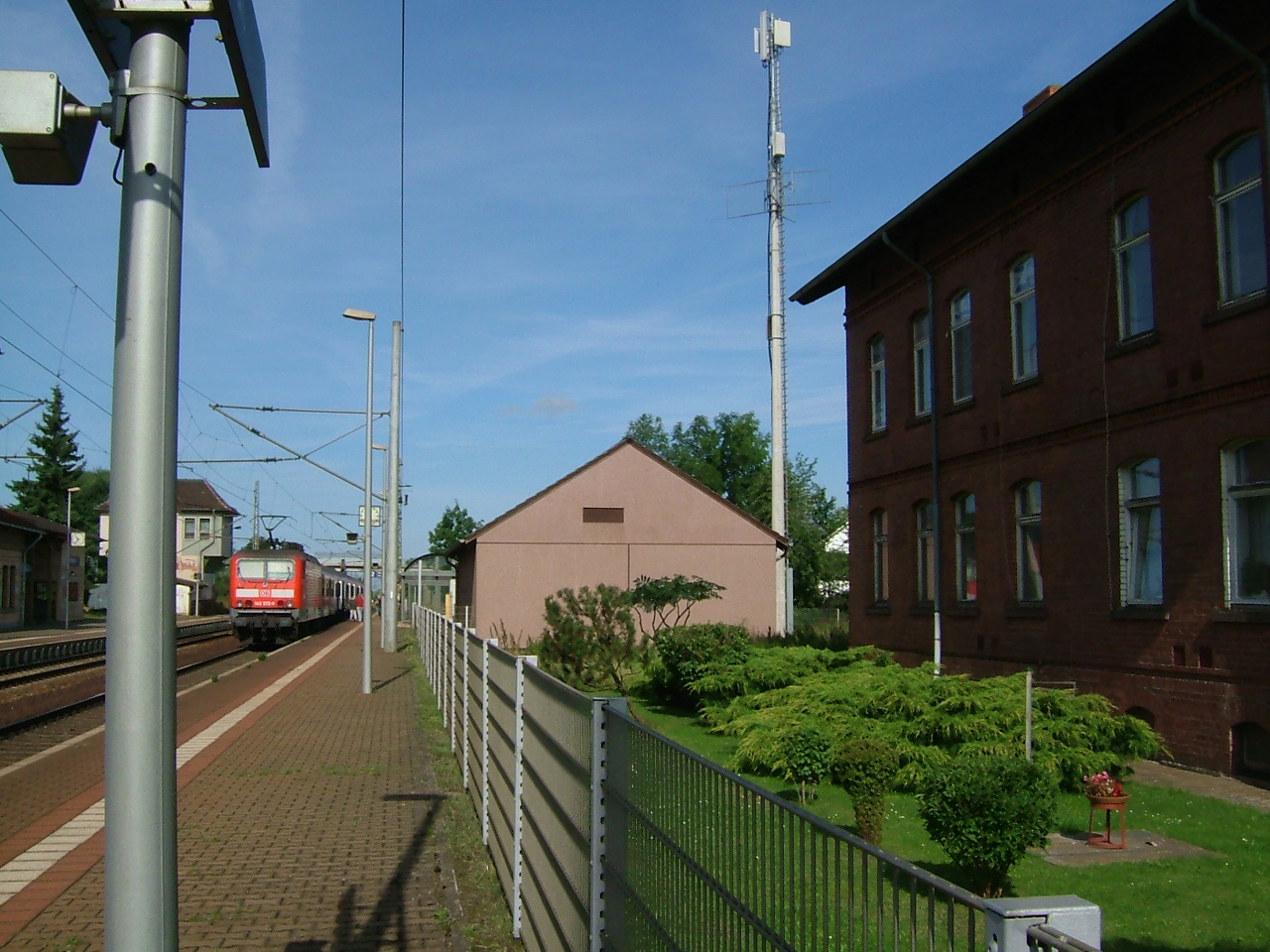

General information
- Location: Fröttstädt, Thuringia; Germany
- Coordinates: 50°55′49″N 10°34′21″E
- Owner: Deutsche Bahn
- Operator: DB Station&Service
- Lines: Thuringian Railway; Friedrichroda Railway

Other information
- Station code: 1972
- DS100 code: UFT
- IBNR: 8010118
- Category: 5

Services
Preceding station	Abellio Rail Mitteldeutschland	Following station
Mechterstädt towards Eisenach	RB 20	Gotha towards Leipzig Hbf
Preceding station		Following station
Terminus	RB 48	Hörselgau towards Friedrichroda
Location
- Location within Thuringia Location within Germany Location within Europe

Fröttstädt is a railway station situated in Fröttstädt in the German state of Thuringia. It is situated on the Bebra to Erfurt main line, with another line branching off to Friedrichroda.

A unique feature of the station is its warm water supply - the water is provided by a nearby residential building, using surplus boiler capacity.

Track plan of Fröttstädt station (June 2018).
