= Friedrichroda Railway =

Railway line in Germany

Fröttstädt–Georgenthal
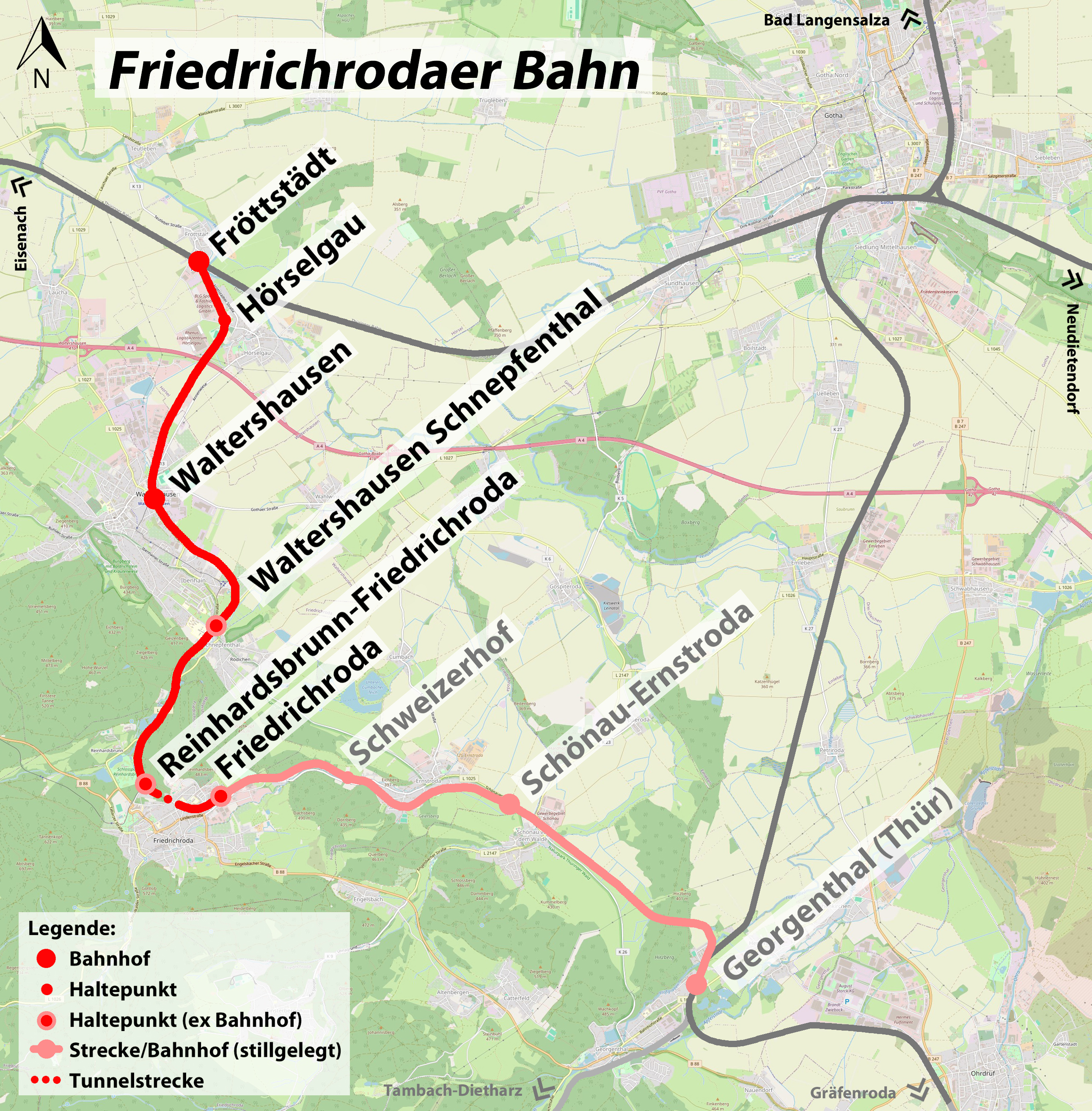

Overview
- Line number: 6702
- Locale: Thuringia, Germany

Service
- Route number: 606

Technical
- Line length: 18.8 km (11.7 mi)
- Track gauge: 1,435 mm (4 ft 8 1/2 in) standard gauge
- Operating speed: 50km/h (max)

The Friedrichroda railway, known as well as Waldsaumbahn, is a single-track non-electrified railway line in the German state of Thuringia. It is now only used for regional passenger transport, using Class 641 (Alstom Coradia A TER) diesel multiple units. The line was opened in 1848 and is the oldest branch line in Thuringia and one of the oldest lines in Germany.

== History ==
The line was opened on 28 May 1848 as a spur of the Thuringian Railway (German: Thüringer Bahn) from Fröttstädt to Waltershausen. It is the oldest branch line in Thuringia. An extension to Friedrichroda was opened on 2 July 1876. On 1 November 1896 the line from Friedrichroda to Georgenthal was opened to connect with the Ohra Valley Railway, but on 2 November 1947 the extension was closed and dismantled as reparations to the Soviet Union.

== Current situation ==
After the loss of freight traffic the terminus at Friedrichroda is now very run-down. The abandoned and overgrown rail tracks and the now oversized station building with its very large goods shed testify to the former importance of the line and the Friedrichroda station. While a youth club is located in part of the entrance building, the rest of the building along with the entire entrance building at Reinhardsbrunn-Friedrichroda is now disused and subject to decay and vandalism.

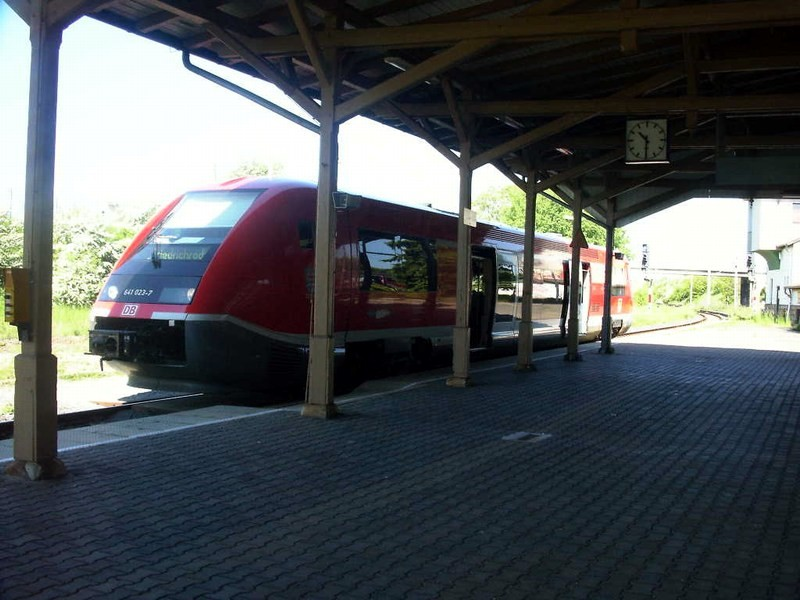
A Class 641 train in Fröttstädt station

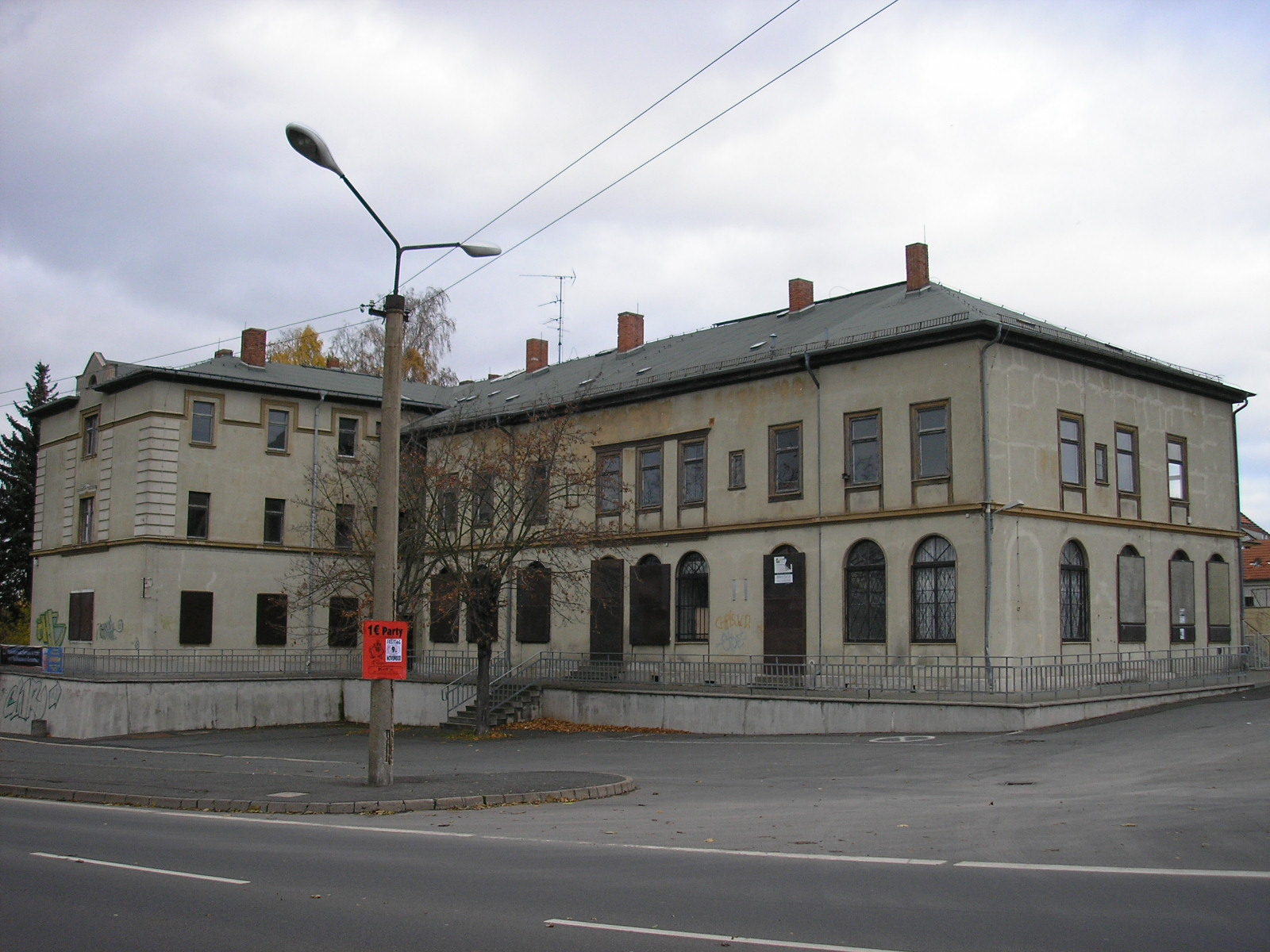
The entrance hall of Waltershausen station

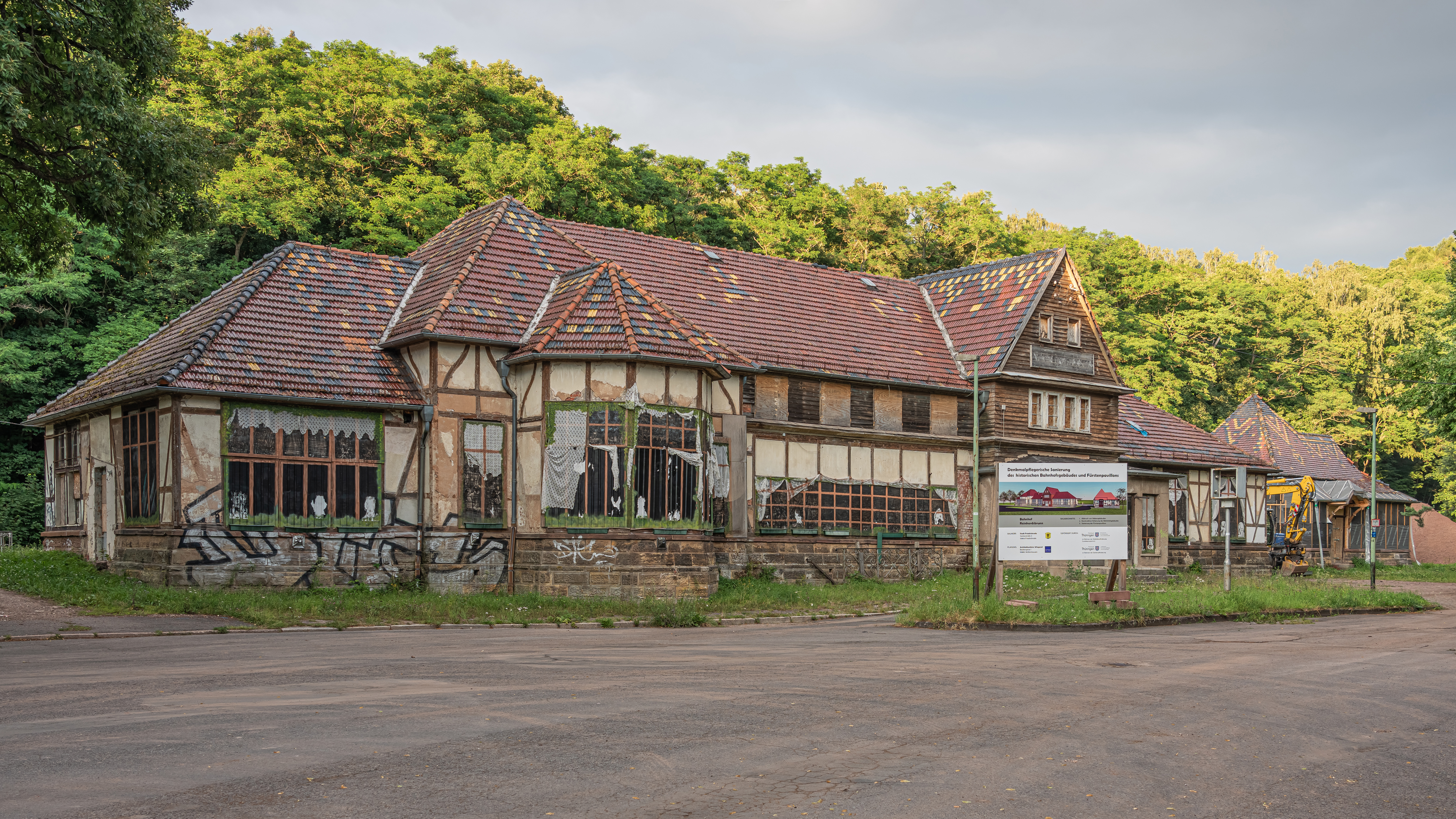
The entrance hall of Reinhardsbrunn-Friedrichroda station
