= Leipzig–Probstzella railway =

German railway line

Leipzig-Leutzsch–Probstzella railway
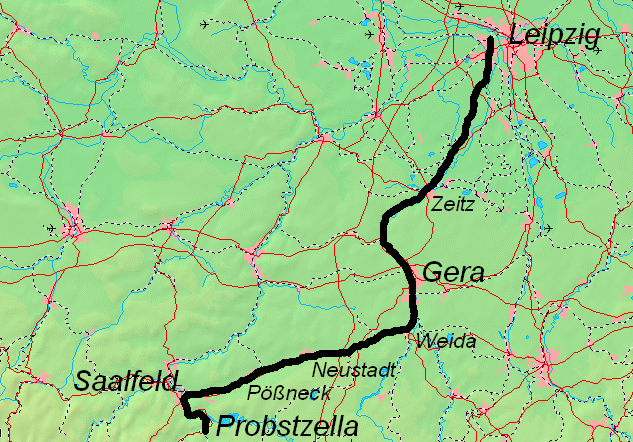

Overview
- Line number: 6383
- Locale: Saxony, Saxony-Anhalt and Thuringia, Germany

Service
- Route number: 550 (Leipzig–Gera); 555 (Gera–Saalfeld); 557 (Saalfeld–Hockeroda); 558 (Gera–Weida); 840 (Saalfeld–Probstzella)

Technical
- Line length: 159.97 km (99.40 mi)
- Number of tracks: 2: Leipzig-Leutzsch–Zeitz; 2: Gera Hbf–Gera-Zwötzen; 2: Unterwellenborn–Probstzella
- Electrification: 15 kV/16.7 Hz AC catenary (Leipzig-Leutzsch–Leipzig-Plagwitz and Saalfeld–Probstzella)
- Operating speed: 120 km/h (74.6 mph) (maximum)

The Leipzig–Probstzella railway is a line in the German states of Saxony, Saxony-Anhalt and Thuringia. It runs from Leipzig through the valley of the White Elster via Zeitz, Gera, Triptis, the Orlasenke lowland and Saalfeld to Probstzella. Since it runs parallel with the Saal Railway but is higher, it is also called the Obere Bahn ("upper railway").

== Route ==
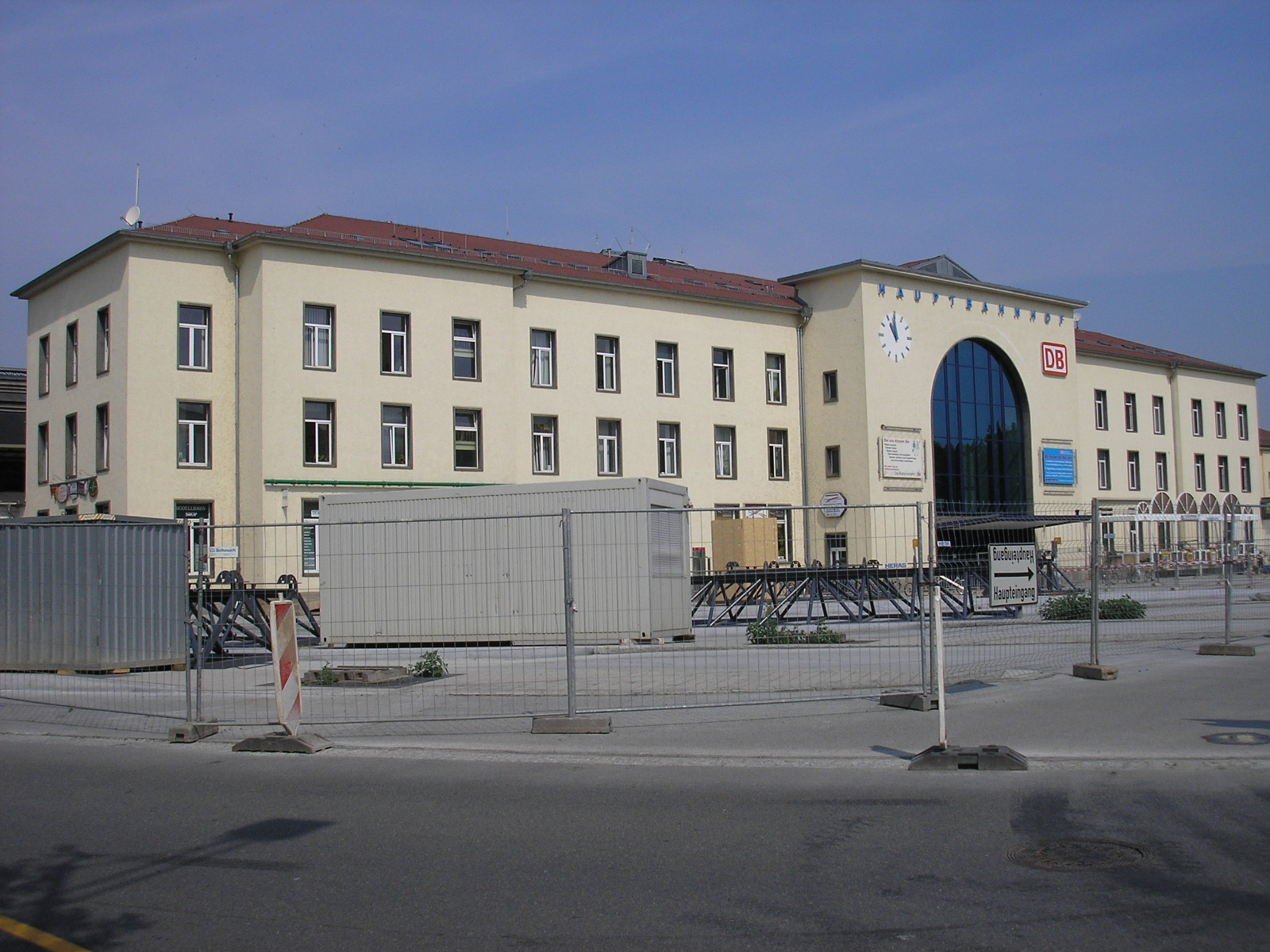
Gera Hauptbahnhof

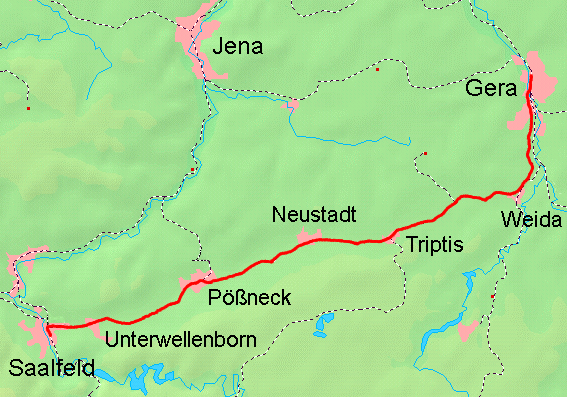
Southern section of the route

The line begins in Leipzig Leutzsch and runs south from the city. The line then runs through the flat Leipzig Bay along the Elster through the former central German lignite mining area. This section of the line was once used to transport lignite to nearby power plants, but this traffic has declined considerably.

The line reaches Zeitz at the southern edge of the lowlands, where it connects with other lines, although some of the network has been closed since 1990. The hills on either side of the White Elster south of Zeitz are steeper. Near Ahlendorf (the administrative centre of Heideland-Elstertal), the line crosses the border between Saxony-Anhalt and Thuringia. The line now runs on a long curve through the communities of Crossen an der Elster and the brewery town of Bad Köstritz to Gera, where it meets several other lines. Until 1998, the Crossen–Porstendorf line ran from Crossen an der Elster station via Eisenberg and Bürgel to Porstendorf (north of Jena).

The line runs to the south from Gera Hauptbahnhof. Once out of the city it runs along the banks of the White Elster before running along the valley of the Weida. To the west of the town of Weida the line crosses a crest on the approach to Triptis at an altitude of about 375 metres above sea level. The line now runs through the Orlasenke lowland and continues on a straight path to the south-west through the town of Neustadt an der Orla, continuing to Oppurg, where until 1944 the Orla Railway branched off towards Pößneck unterer (lower) station and Orlamünde. It then runs through Pößneck ober (upper) station to Saalfeld, where it connects with the Saal Railway, which links Berlin and Munich.

== History ==
The second quarter of the line was opened in 1859. At that time, a line was built from Weißenfels (connecting there with the Thuringian Railway opened in 1846) via Zeitz to Gera. It was the first line to Gera, which was capital of the Principality of Reuss Younger Line and had about 14,000 inhabitants at that time.

The northern section of the line between Zeitz and Leipzig traffic was opened in 1873. Until the completion of the connecting curve between the Thuringian railway and the Saal Railway at Großheringen in 1900, it was the most important link between Prussia and Bavaria, except for the Saxon-Bavarian Railway. Although the curve at Großheringen meant that the Saal Railway was 25 km shorter, the north–south connection (Nord-Süd-Verbindung) through Gera continued to be used as a long-distance line from Leipzig in the north to Nuremberg in the south.

The section from Gera to Eichicht (now part of Kaulsdorf) was opened on 20 December 1871. It was of great importance for the nearby towns. It allowed the textile industry in the Orlasenke, especially in Pößneck, to grow rapidly before the First World War. Pößneck thus became a centre of the Thuringian textile industry along with Apolda and Greiz. Also of importance to this section was the former Maxhütte steel and rolling mill in Unterwellenborn as well as the steel works, now known as the Thuringian Steelworks (Stahlwerk Thüringen). The line built in 1871 ran through the following states (starting in Gera): Reuss Younger Line, Saxe-Weimar-Eisenach, Prussia, Saxe-Meiningen, Prussia, Schwarzburg-Rudolstadt and Sachsen-Meiningen. A temporary terminus was built in Eichicht as the route for the continuation of the line and connection to Bavaria was still unclear.

Before the Second World War the entire line was double track. In 1946 the second track was dismantled as reparations to the Soviet Union. The line at Knautnaundorf was realigned for the establishment of an open cut lignite mine under the East German regime.

The section from Saalfeld and Probstzella was electrified by 1939. Seven years later, all components of the electrification along with the second track were removed for reparations to the Soviet Union. Because of the division of Germany the line had little importance for the next four decades.

Double track has been restored on the sections between Leipzig Hauptbahnhof and Zeitz, between Gera Hauptbahnhof and Gera Süd and between Unterwellenborn and Probstzella. Electrification has been restored on the section between Saalfeld and Probstzella.

== Operations until 2012 ==
Regional-Express (RE) 12 services and Regionalbahn (RB) 51 services run between Leipzig and Gera. The RB and RE services both run every two hours, alternating with each other to create an hourly service. In addition, on Saturdays (during the summer timetable), a pair of RE trains run from Leipzig via Gera and Saalfeld to Blankenstein (Schiefergebirgs-Express) and to Katzhütte (Schwarzatal Express).

The Gera-Saalfeld section was served by RE 4 services between Gera and Saalfeld every two hours. In addition, RB services alternate with the RE services every two hours between the two cities. These are mostly operated by class 612 and class 642 diesel multiple units. Until 2012 all services had been operated by DB Regio.

== Current operations ==
Since 2012, passenger services on the Leipzig–Zeitz–Gera–Saalfeld section are operated by Erfurter Bahn.

Since 15 December 2013 S-Bahn Mitteldeutschland trains use this line between Leipzig-Leutzsch and Leipzig-Plagwitz.
