= Fröttstädt =

- Ortsteil of Hörsel
- Interactive map of Fröttstädt
- Location within Germany Location within Thuringia
- Coordinates: 50°56′N 10°35′E
- Country: Germany
- State: Thuringia
- District: Gotha
- Municipality: Hörsel

Area
  - Total: 3.99 km^{2} (1.54 sq mi)
- Elevation: 295 m (968 ft)

Population (2010-12-31)
  - Total: 408
  - Density: 102/km^{2} (265/sq mi)
- Time zone: UTC+01:00 (CET)
  - Summer (DST): UTC+02:00 (CEST)
- Postal codes: 99880
- Dialling codes: 03622
- Website: www.ffw-froettstaedt.de

Fröttstädt is a village and a former municipality in the district of Gotha in Thuringia, Germany. Since 1 December 2011, it is part of the municipality Hörsel. Its railway station has a unique water supply method.

== History ==
Within the German Empire (1871–1918), Fröttstädt was part of Saxe-Coburg and Gotha.
