= Orla Railway =

Orlamünde–Oppurg

Overview
- Line number: 6684

Service
- Route number: 559

Technical
- Line length: 14.9 km

The Orla Railway (German: Orlabahn) is a 14.9 kilometre long branch line in Thuringia, that runs from Orlamünde on the Saal Railway to Pößneck's "lower station" (unterer Bahnhof). Until 1946 there was a continuation of the line to Oppurg on the Leipzig–Gera–Saalfeld railway.

The 11.7 km long line, that branches off in Orlamünde from the Saal Railway south of Jena and is only operated today as far as the lower station in Pößneck, was inaugurated on 1 October 1889 to this station.

A second section of line followed, from Pößneck lower station to Oppurg, which was opened in 1892 and closed again in 1946, because that section went after the war to the then Soviet Union as a war reparation.

The section remaining today underwent a full renovation (Grundsanierung) in 1999/2000. In the years that followed an hourly service was introduced on this line and, since the 2001 timetable change, the services connect to Jena Saal station (Jena Saalbahnhof).
