= Plaue–Themar railway =

Railway line in Germany

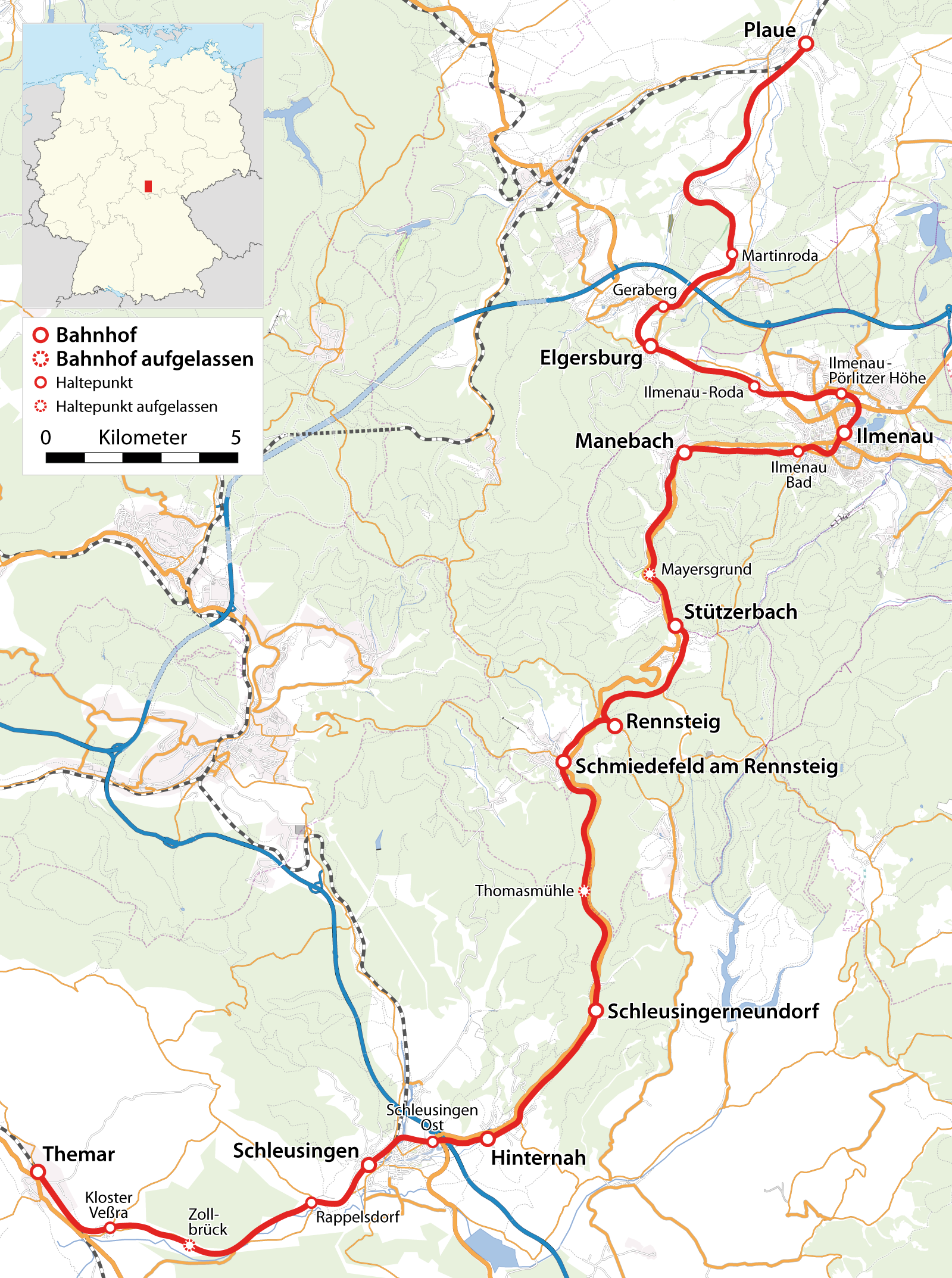

Overview
- Line number: 6694 (Plaue–Rennsteig); 6708 (Rennsteig–Themar)
- Locale: Thuringia, Germany

Service
- Route number: 566

Technical
- Line length: 62 km (39 mi)
- Track gauge: 1,435 mm (4 ft 8 1/2 in) standard gauge
- Electrification: 15 kV/16.7 Hz AC catenary
- Maximum incline: 6.12%

The Plaue–Themar railway is a 62 kilometre-long, single-track, non-electrified, standard-gauge branch-line in the Thuringian Forest (Thüringer Wald) in Germany. The Stützerbach–Schleusingerneundorf section was built as the first Prussian rack railway between 1879 and 1904 and connects the Erfurt–Schweinfurt railway in the north via the towns of Plaue, Ilmenau, Schleusingen and Themar with the Eisenach–Lichtenfels railway in the south.

It is divided into three sections: the northern section from Plaue to Ilmenau is currently operated once an hour by Erfurter Bahn, the steep section in the middle from Ilmenau to Schleusingen, which originally contained stretches of rack, and the southern section from Schleusingen to Themar. There is occasional freight traffic on the southern section.

== Plaue–Ilmenau ==
=== Route ===
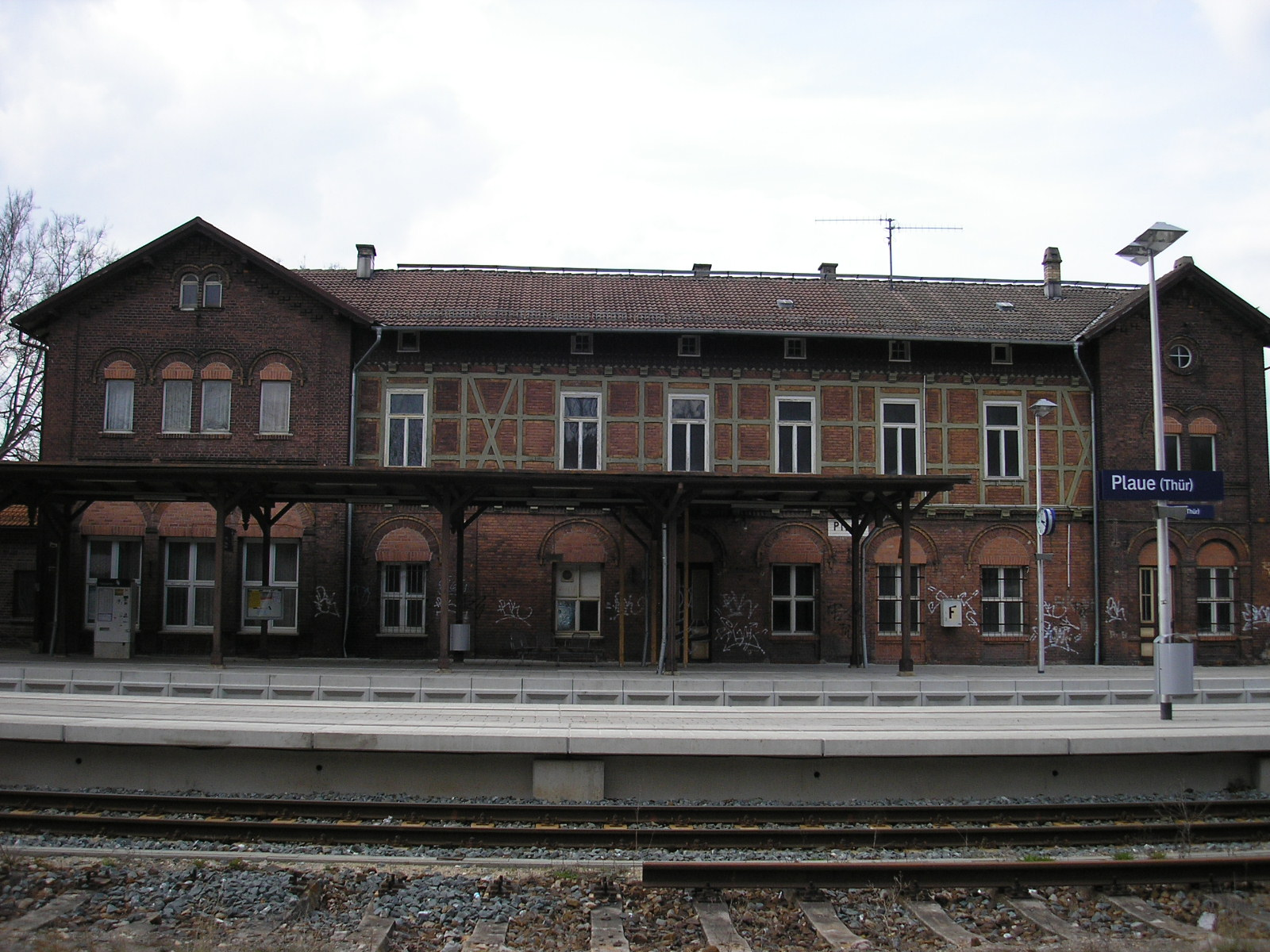
Plaue station, starting point of the line

Today's secondary line branches off the Erfurt–Schweinfurt railway in Plaue. The line climbs 200 metres during the 10 km-long section to Geraberg. The route followed here does not run through the easier Reichenbach valley, but instead climbs the slope up the valley of the Zahme Gera. The reasons are historical. There are numerous rocky areas where the terrain is nearly impassable. The line climbs steeply on the western slope of the valley and reaches a height that is about 30 m above the valley in Angelroda. Here it crosses the valley on a viaduct, which is followed by a 20 m deep cutting, where the line transitions from the Gera valley to the Reichenbach valley. It continues through relatively flat terrain to Martinroda, which also has a Haltepunkt (halt), although it is about 2 km from the village. The next place on the line is Geraberg. The route changes again from the Reichenbach valley to the Gera valley. The line runs above the village around Mönchsheide hill to Elgersburg station. In the village there is a cutting that is about 12 m deep, which takes the line from the Gera valley to the Reichenbach valley again. Here it runs relatively directly on the edge of the forest to the southeast towards Ilmenau-Roda. There the high point of the section is reached at an altitude of 515 metres. It then passes through a wide curve, past the halt of Ilmenau Pörlitzer Höhe (opened in 1995) through the town of Ilmenau down into the Ilm valley, where Ilmenau station is located at an altitude of 477 metres.

=== History ===
==== Background and construction ====
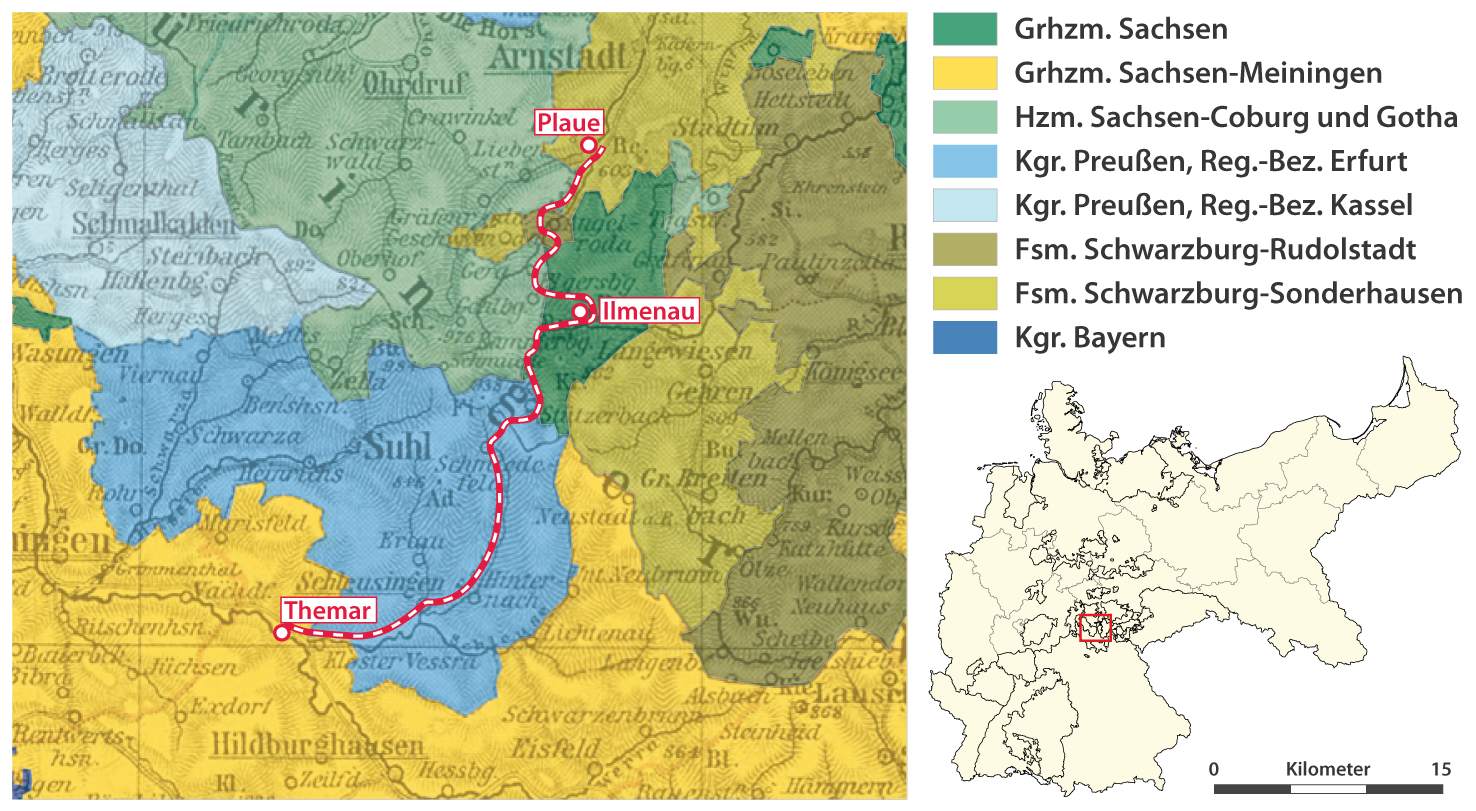
Route through the small Thuringian states (until 1920)

When the Neudietendorf–Arnstadt railway reached Arnstadt, there were increasing demands for railway to Ilmenau. The efforts failed for the time being due to the political fragmentation of Thuringia. The rulers of four Thuringian states had to give permission for a route between Arnstadt and Ilmenau. They had little interest in economic competition with their capital cities along the Leipzig–Weimar–Erfurt–Gotha–Eisenach axis. In addition, transport planners were already forging other plans, like an Ilmenau–Suhl connection, which would form part of a Berlin–Stuttgart route, and an Ilmenau–Saalfeld connection. Prussia urged Suhl (which, along with Erfurt, belonged to Prussia) to build a connection to the northern Thuringian foreland to provide an efficient access to the arms industry in Suhl. A further extension of the line via Stützerbach to Suhl, which had already been envisaged by the planners in the early planning phase, was not carried out, since no agreement was reached between the small states of the Thuringian area affected by the line and the construction costs were too high. Under this option, an approximately 2000 m-long tunnel would have been built under the ridge of the Thuringian Forest in the Schmücke/Großer Finsterberg area.

When the Thuringian Railway Company (Thüringische Eisenbahn-Gesellschaft) proposed in 1876 to continue the line from Arnstadt to Ilmenau, difficult negotiations had to be held with the representatives of the various states. The Duke of Saxe-Coburg and Gotha Ernst II offered the greatest resistance. The Thuringian Railway Company knew that the Duke liked to stay in Elgersburg for recreation and they wanted to meet him with a proposal for a route that would start in the valley of the Zahme Gera and run via Geschwenda, Arlesberg (which later merged with mid-Thuringian—mittelthüringischen—Gera to form Geraberg) to Elgersburg. This plan failed initially due to the resistance of the Duke, who wanted to build a railway from Ohrdruf to Elgersburg that would have run entirely over his own territory, but also due to massive protests by the citizens of Geschwenda against the railway. The citizens feared that constant boiler explosions would ravage the country, that the smoke of the locomotives would pollute the air and make the grass bitter and that the cows would give only sour milk as a result of the sight of the monsters—common prejudices in the time, which George Stephenson also had to fight in England. The planned line running entirely through the Reichenbach valley and Martinroda was welcomed there and Martinroda was willing to provide the land for any route through it free of charge. However, this route now failed because of the veto of the Duke of Gotha. Since his preferred route from Ohrdruf to Elgersburg proved too expensive, he had to give it up and now wanted a station in Elgersburg on the Arnstadt–Ilmenau line. His approval for the project was needed because the Arnstadt–Plaue section of the line had to run through his territory. A route from Plaue that only ran through the Reichenbach Valley would not have passed through Elgersburg, but it would have been much cheaper. The Duke's consent was dependent on a large and prestigious station in Elgersburg, which would include permanent additional tracks that would be available for the use of his special trains.

The route now required an elaborate and expensive structure in Angelroda in order to be able to fulfill the promise given to Martinroda, even though Martinroda station could no longer be built in the village and instead had to be built 2 km away from it. The new complex route also avoided touching the area of the municipality of Geschwenda, whose citizens were vehement against the building of a railway. In fact, Martinroda and Geraberg (at that time still called Gera ) provided virtually all the land for the line free of charge. As a result of the new route, Geraberg also now received a station. This is only about 1.1 km in a direct line from the station in Elgersburg, also connected by a direct road, but the railway was difficult to build. It is 1.7 km-long and required an elaborate, deep cutting through rock. In Angelroda support for the 26 m high embankment on the edge of the village, which was now necessary, was anything but enthusiastic, as it was feared that there would be less "good air" coming down from the Thuringian Forest in down-slope winds. They therefore wanted a bridge that was as long as possible. This would have increased the cost of the project that was now estimated to cost 4,140,000 marks (M) by a further 27,000 M, which the Thüringian Railway Company did not want to raise to benefit farmers in Angelroda. The little village of Angelroda did not have the necessary financial resources to pay for the proposed change, even though this was only a fraction of the cost of the changes required to meet the special demands of the Duke of Gotha.

The Principality of Schwarzburg-Rudolstadt sought a continuation of the line to Gehren and on to Schwarzburg, Rudolstadt and Saalfeld. There it would have connected with the Gera–Saalfeld–Eichicht railway opened in 1871. The building permit for the Arnstadt–Ilmenau railway was therefore issued only on the condition that this connection was to be built within 10 years and that the entire line was to be at least prepared to allow a second track to be built. This requirement meant that all viaducts, mountain sections and bridges had to be built significantly larger than originally planned. All stone bridges and the embankment from Plaue towards Ilmenau across the valley of the Zahme Gera (called the Sand valley in Plaue), which is 825 m long and up to 8.5 m high, were designed for the eventual laying of a second track, but only the abutments of stone bridges like the viaduct over Angelroda were built for two tracks, while the steel superstructures and pillars were built for one track. The only doubling of the track that was ever implemented was a section built between Arnstadt and Plaue during the construction of the main line from Plaue via Oberhof and Suhl to Würzburg and Stuttgart.

As a result of tenacious negotiations, the Thuringian Railway Company was able to conclude treaties with all four Thuringian Principalities concerned. Agreements were signed with Saxe-Weimar-Eisenach on 16 April 1877, with Saxe-Coburg and Gotha and with Schwarzburg-Rudolstadt on 6 June 1877 and with Schwarzburg-Sondershausen on 27 June 1877. Tree clearing began in the winter of 1877/78 and the groundbreaking ceremony was held on 23 April 1878 at Kleine Spiegelsberg, between Roda and Elgersburg. The building was divided into two sections (Arnstadt–Angelroda and Angelroda–Ilmenau) and it was carried out simultaneously in all construction phases. On average, 300 workers were employed in each section. Among them were many workers from Italy, Croatia, Poland and the Tyrol. The pay was 3.50 M to 4.50 M per day in the summer and 2.25 M to 3.25 M per day in the winter because of the shorter days. Day labourers earned 2.25 M per day. During the construction work, five workers were killed in work accidents, while there were five major and eleven minor injuries. The line was essentially built by hand and was supplied by a field railway from Arnstadt.

The most outstanding achievements were the rock cutting on the approach through a hill to the bridge in Angelroda, which was up to 26 m deep, and the movement of earth for an embankment near Plaue, which was 825 m long and up to 8.5 m high. 90,000 m³ of rock was placed for this embankment below the track and 150,000 m³ of rock was placed above the track bed. The project used a funicular, which ran on a wooden trestle which had been built for it. Rock was dumped from the funicular down on the embankment. The wooden trestle was left in the completed embankment. Rocks along almost the whole line had to be loosened with explosives. 2,950 kg of dynamite, 8,810 kg of black powder and 115,000 percussion caps were used for about 10,000 firings.

The line has grades from Plaue of 1:50 to 1:70 and sections with radii of only 300 m as it passes through a genuine mountain range. The largest bridge on the line is the Marien bridge near Plaue. It spanned former federal highway 4 at line-kilometre 15.9. The biggest bridge on the line is the arched viaduct in Angelroda. It is 26.5 m high, 100.4 m long and consists of three spans. 253 t of steel were used for the bridge. It was built in a very innovative way as a projected bridge supported by auxiliary scaffolds. For this purpose, the individual sections of the bridge were mounted on the projections of the viaduct and moved over the bridge piers by being hauled by cable. The position of the entire bridge on a sharply curving track made this bridge construction difficult and also posed a challenge for the designers. A curiosity is also the construction of the retaining walls at the bases of the bridge piers. Here, the supporting walls were not inclined, as is normal custom, but were stepped instead. It is not known why the greater and self-reinforcing stability of a sloped retaining wall was not used. The original steel lattice structures of the two piers were covered in concrete in 1905 to increase their load bearing capacity. In contrast to the steel pillars, the rebuilt concrete bridge piers were again designed to receive the superstructures for a second track that was never installed. On the new, wider piers, a new, stronger bridge was built parallel to the existing bridge and the track was swung onto it and the old superstructure, with the exception of the old bridge deck, which was cast in place, was demolished. Since then the eastern side of the piers has been undeveloped. The masonry structure of the bridge piers is deceptive and has only a visual character. In fact, the pillars are not brick, but are cast in mass concrete.

==== Later development ====
The Arnstadt–Ilmenau line was opened on 6 August 1879.

The continuation of the line from Ilmenau to Gehren was opened on 13 November 1881. The planned extension to Königsee and Saalfeld, however, was not implemented and a planned continuation to Stadtilm and Weimar through the Ilm valley was also not built. Königsee was reached from Rudolstadt by the Schwarza Valley Railway (Schwarzatalbahn, later considered to be the Köditzberg-Königsee railway or part of the Rottenbach–Katzhütte railway) in 1899, but the missing 8 km section to Gehren through geologically easy terrain was never built because of a lack of profitability and this was partly responsible for the later closure of both branch lines. The line to Gehren was, however, extended to Großbreitenbach on 2 December 1883. The planned continuation from Grossbreitenbach to Schönbrunn (in the municipality of Schleusegrund) or Katzhütte (which the Schwarza Valley Railway reached from Rudolstadt on 18 August 1900) was omitted. Here, in particular, a 7 km-long connection to Katzhütte would have significantly increased traffic on the line, but it failed because of the difficult geology on this route.

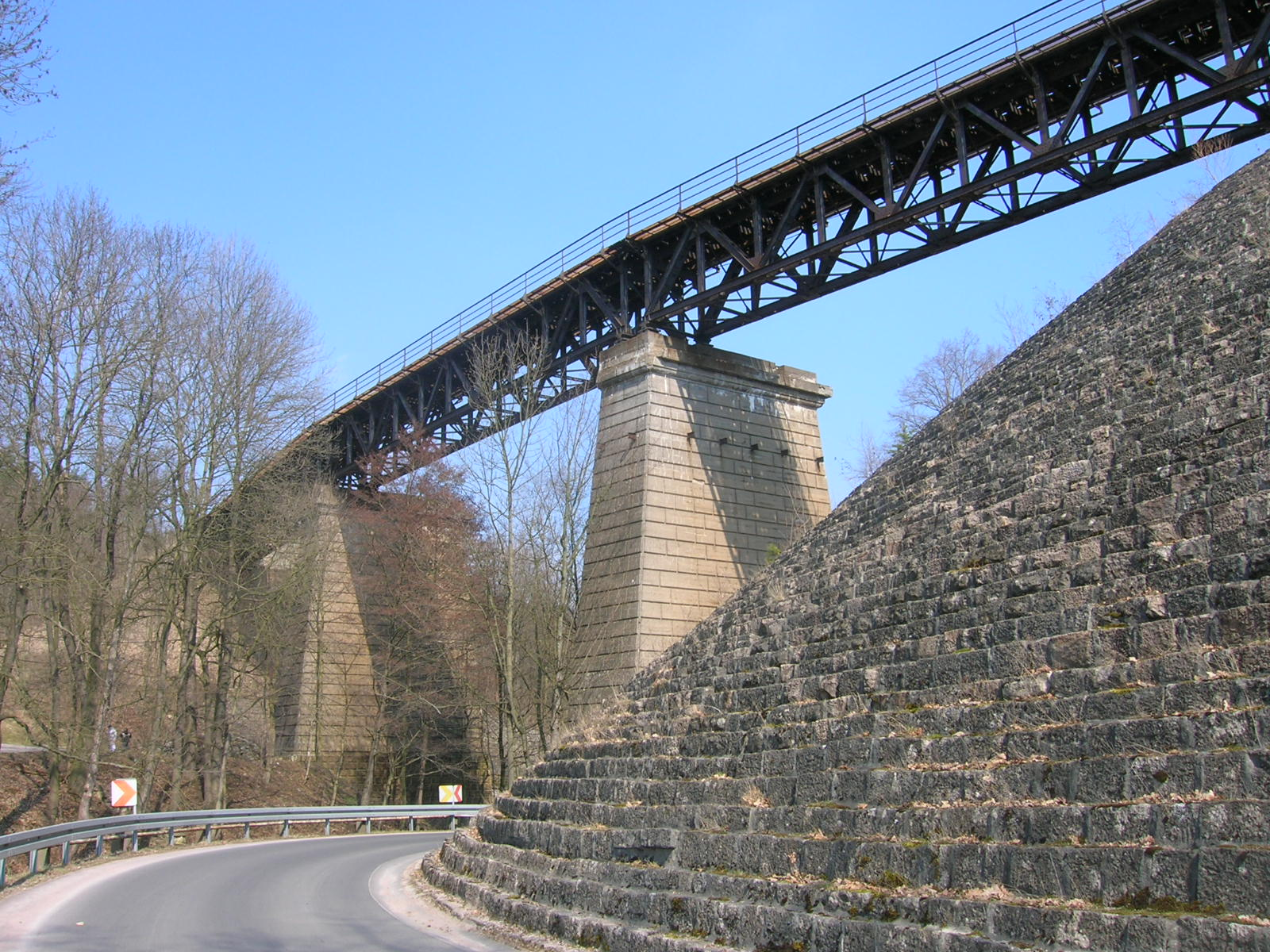
Angelroda Viaduct, 2006

In the last war days of the Second World War, the bridge in Angelroda was prepared for detonation, although it was completely irrelevant to the course of the war. Citizens of Angelroda, who feared damage to their houses, some of which were next to the bridge, delayed the detonation until the arrival of American troops. During the Cold War, acts of sabotage to the bridge were feared. Therefore, it was permanently guarded from 1950 to 1958/59.

During the time of the GDR, the line initially had the timetable number of "189d", but since 1968, it has had the number of 622.

A general overhaul of the line took place in the summer of 1970. The track and sleepers were replaced, and the railway line was moved to the centre of the formation in places, since doubling of the track was no longer expected.

Over several months in 2012/2013, the line between Plaue and Ilmenau was rehabilitated with all traffic operating and the line speed was increased to 80 km/h. Over a two kilometre-long section, adjacent rock walls were secured with a special system of nets. The free steel trusses of the viaduct at Angelroda were lifted with mobile cranes and then repaired. A total of €13 m was allocated for these works. Due to heavy corrosion of the bridge’s superstructure, this could not be completed by the end of October 2012 as planned. The recommencement of services was postponed initially from 19 November 2012 to 16 May 2013. The renovation of the section between Elgersburg and Ilmenau, which had originally been planned to be done separately was, however, brought forward and was also intended to be completed by May 2013. After the reconstruction of the bridge superstructure was carried out in the middle of July 2013, the line was re-commissioned on 11 August 2013.

=== Accidents and incidents ===
The temperature fell to -38 °C in the winter of 1928/29. This led to several days without operations because of the icing of the water supply, the locomotives and the points on the line.

On 9 January 1935, a freight train derailed in Martinroda at the exit towards Ilmenau. Locomotive 94106 derailed and remained leaning on a gradient of about 45°. It was recovered and repaired.

Arnstadt locomotive depot was bombed on 6 February 1945. This raid killed 70 forced labourers, who were lodged in barracks near the depot.

Shortly before the end of the war a Lockheed P-38 Lightning strafed a passenger train from Arnstadt at Geraberg killing passengers, including a pregnant woman.

German soldiers senselessly blew up still isolated bridges at the end of the war, like the small bridge over the B88 behind Elgersburg. This was replaced on 1 July 1945 by a temporary timber bridge and finally repaired in 1948 by installing a steel structure.

=== Current operations ===
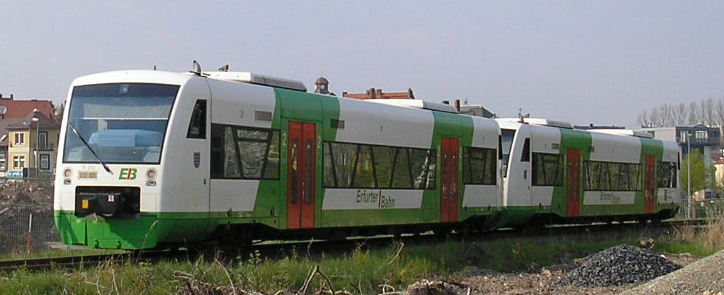
Diesel multiple unit of the Erfurter Bahn near Ilmenau

Today the Plaue–Ilmenau section is served hourly by the Erfurter Bahn line 46 (Erfurt–Arnstadt–Ilmenau, timetable line 566). Two Stadler Regio-Shuttle RS1 diesel multiple units (150 seats) are normally used, occasionally Bombardier Itino sets (120 seats) are also used. Since the timetable change in June 2014, Erfurter Bahn services have run on weekends and holidays to Rennsteig station. Four train pairs run on operating days between Ilmenau and Rennsteig.

== Ilmenau–Schleusingen (Rennsteigbahn) ==
=== Route ===
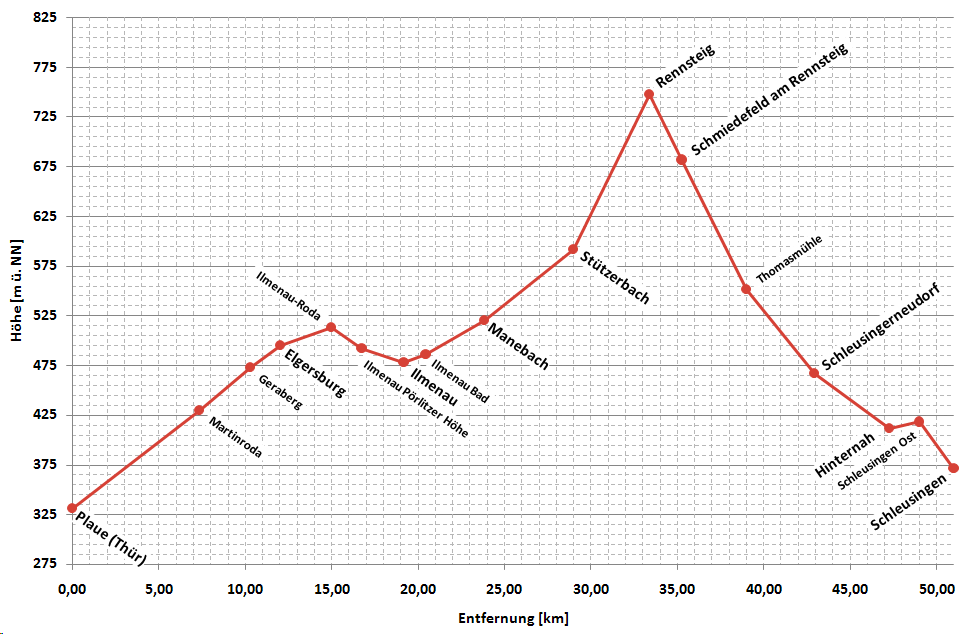
Simplified height profile of the Plaue–Schleusingen section

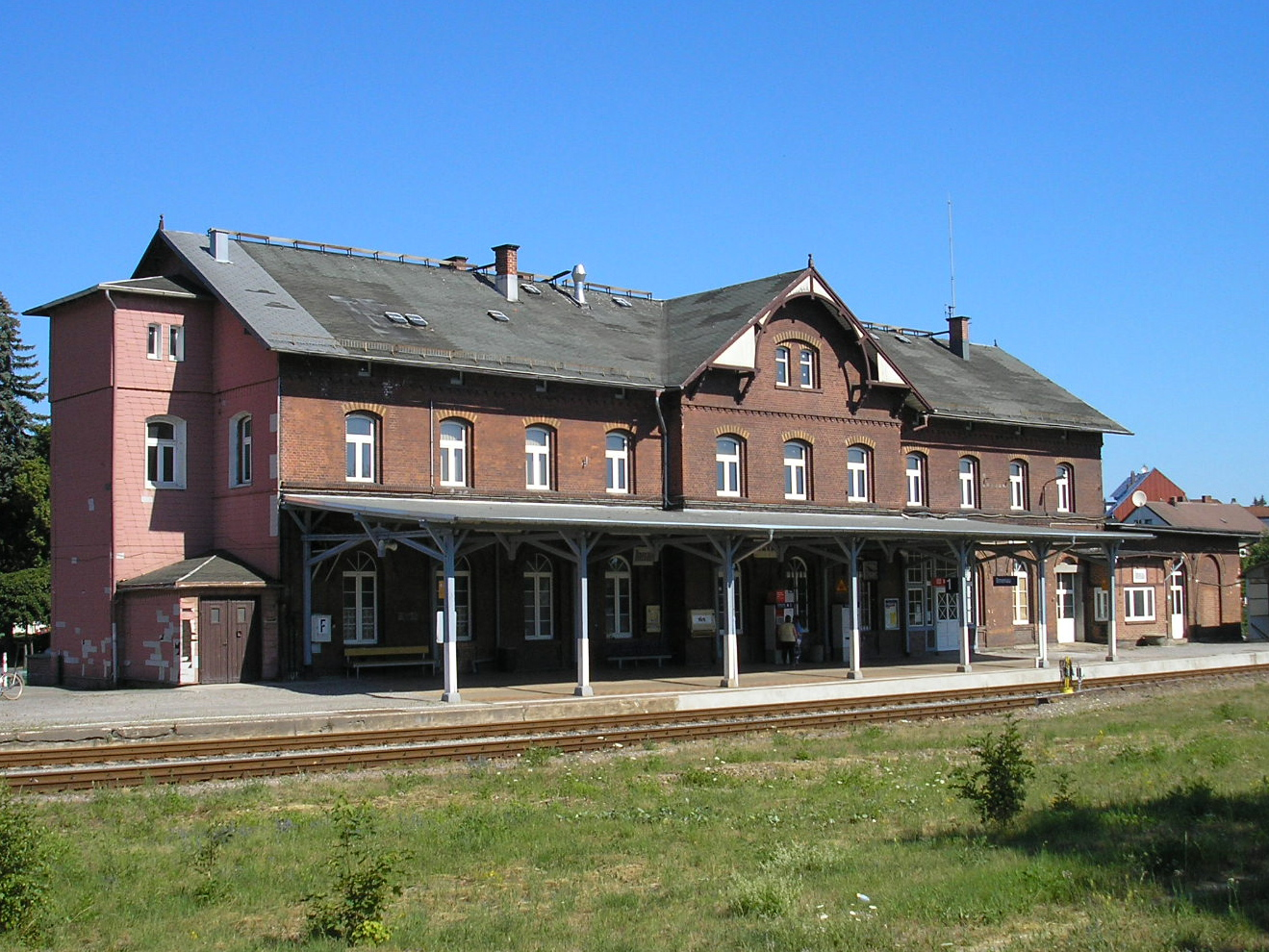
Ilmenau station

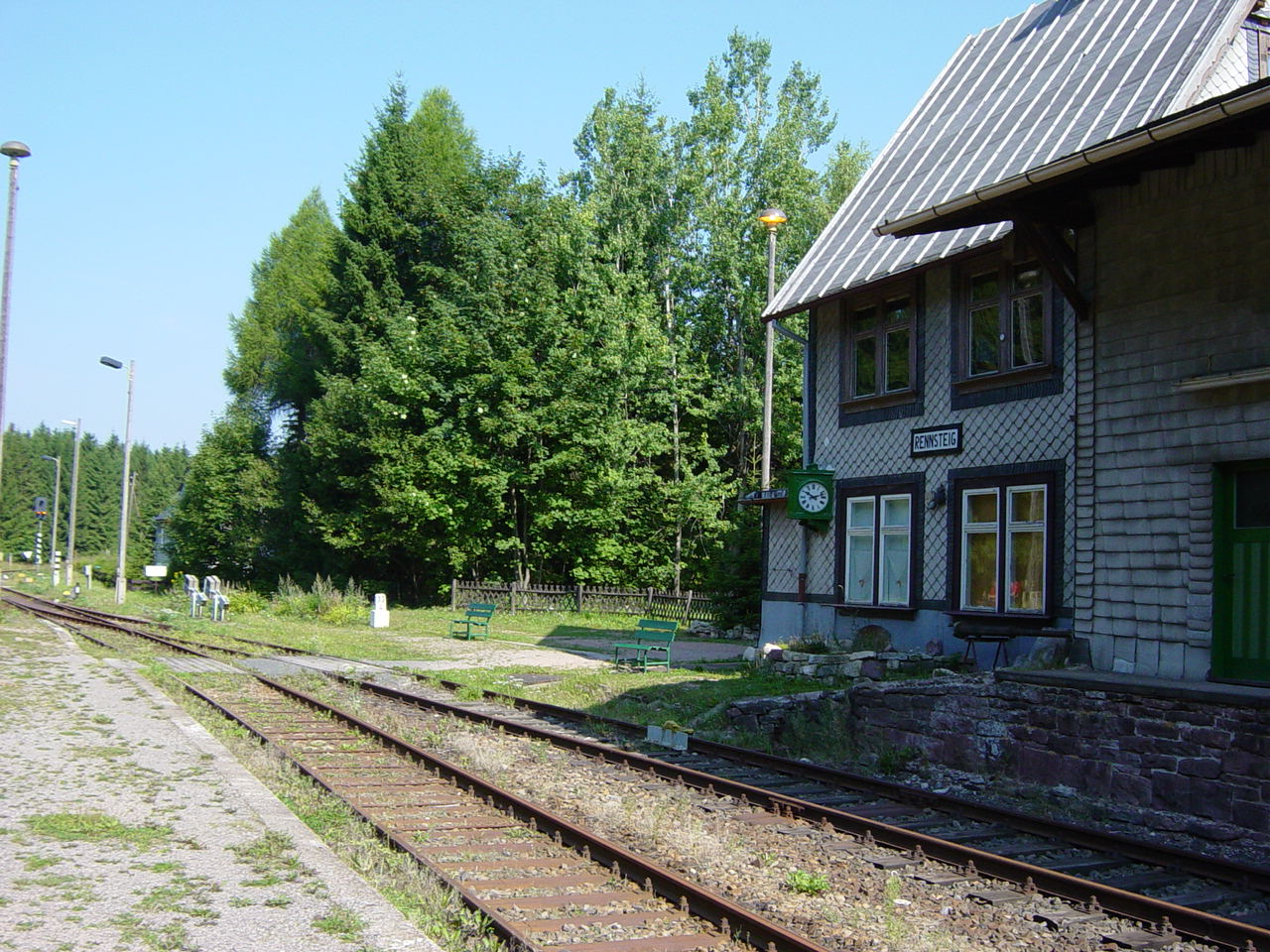
Rennsteig station

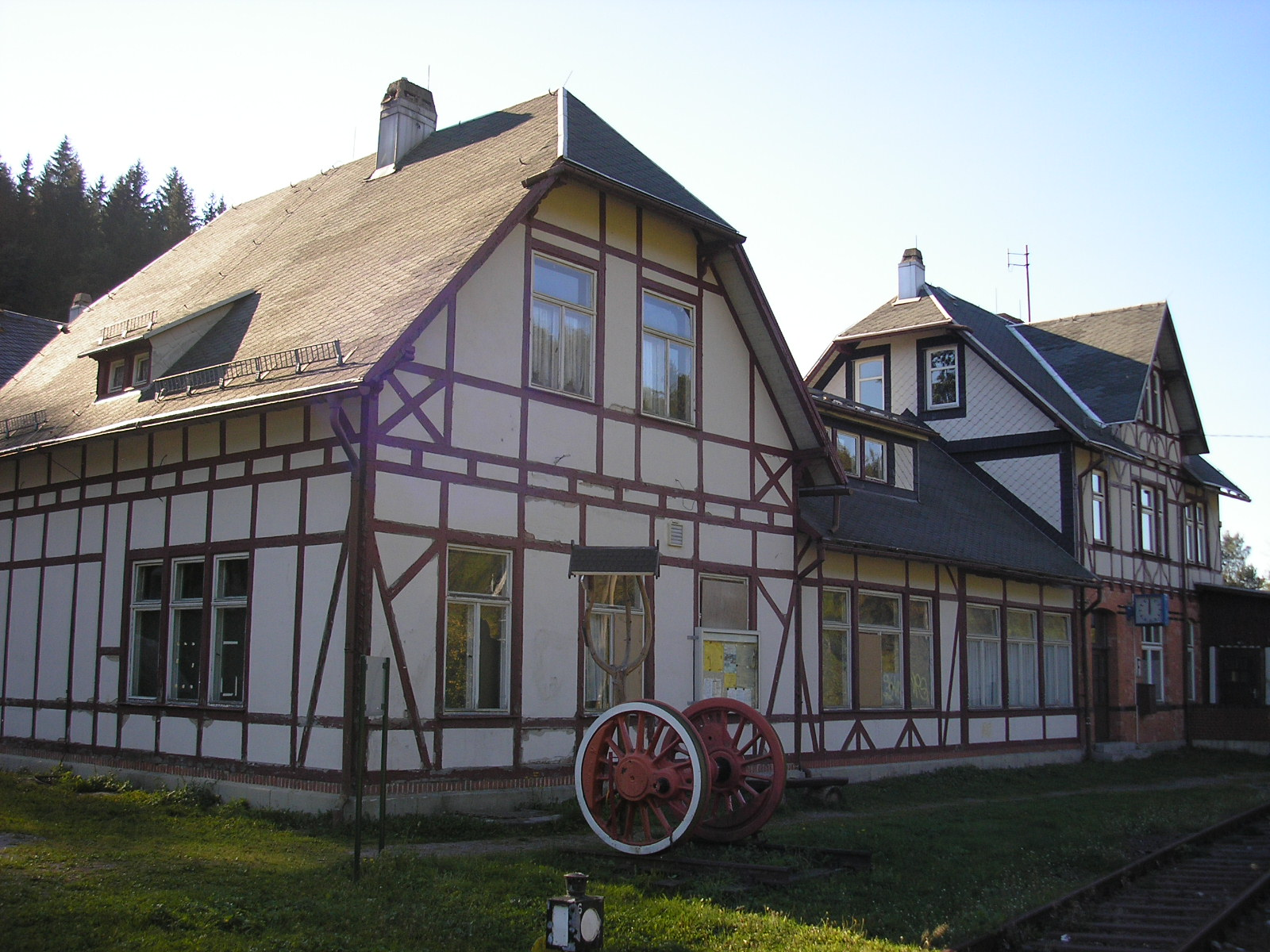
Stützerbach station

The Ilmenau–Schleusingen section has a length of 31.8 km. The line to Großbreitenbach, which was closed in 1998, branched off just after Ilmenau station. The line runs on a gentle curve to the right for 1.3 km through the built-up area of Ilmenau to Ilmenau Bad station. From there, the line follows the Ilm Valley along the foot of the Kickelhahn to Manebach. The station is located in the lower part of a linear settlement, which is about two kilometres long. The line follows the Ilm Valley through Meyersgrund, where there was another halt until 1920, to Stützerbach. The station is at the top of the valley. The line here separates from Bundesstraße 4 (B 4). The continues up the Ilm valley and then takes hairpin turns on the way to Rennsteig. The first steep section of the route starts after Stützerbach. On a stretch of 4.4 km it climbs through a difference in height of 156 m. The Rennsteig line follows the Lengwitz. In the valley of the Göpfersbach, the steepest section north of Rennsteig follows with a gradient that is in parts over 6.0%. The highest point of the line is on the zig zag in Rennsteig station at an altitude of 747.7 m. Beyond Rennsteig station the line runs down the next steep section (5.9%) to reach Schmiedefeld am Rennsteig after two kilometres. Beyond Schmiedefeld, the line runs along the right (western) slope of the Nahe valley. There are two further steep sections with a gradient of 5.9%. Near Schleusingerneundorf, the line reaches the valley floor of the Nahe and runs alongside the B 4 to the station. Beyond Schleusingerneundorf the valley widens and the line continues next to the road. It then runs directly through Hinternah, where the foothills begin. Shortly before the halt at Schleusingen Ost, the railway leaves the Nahe. This is where the last steep section (5.9%) begins, running down the Erle valley. Here the line meets the tracks of the Suhl–Schleusingen railway and runs into Schleusingen station.

=== History ===
The first plans for a railway line from Ilmenau via Stützerbach to Suhl were made in 1868. This project failed due to the need for complex engineering structures as well as the need to gain the approval from different countries.

Schleusingen had belonged to Prussia since 1815. In the vicinity there were many glass and porcelain factories. After the line from Schleusingen to Themar had been built in 1888, Schleusingen tried to persuade the Prussian government of the necessity and profitability of a railway to Ilmenau in order to promote further economic development. Approval was given for the construction of the line in 1899 and surveying began in the same year. Construction of the line started in 1903 and lasted 15 months. The construction cost 3 million instead of the expected 4.4 million marks because, among other things, numerous temporary immigrants were involved in its construction. It commenced operations as a rack railway in August 1904.

Rennsteig station was connected to the Rennsteig–Frauenwald railway from 1913 to 1965.

If the route had only a local significance until the end of the Second World War, this changed after the founding of the GDR. Since East Germans initially found it difficult to travel to many more distant destinations and later were not able to reach them at all, tourism in the Thuringian Forest had its heyday. So there were through holiday trains from Schmiedefeld to Berlin; the DR timetable of 1990/1991 listed a daily train pair on the Schmiedefeld–Magdeburg route.

The freight traffic on the steep Stützerbach–Schleusingen slope was discontinued on 1 January 1970. It ended on the rest of the line on 31 December 1993.

After the end of communism in the GDR, express trains still ran on this secondary railway from Themar to Erfurt and in the opposite direction. Scheduled passenger services ended on the line on 23 May 1998.

=== Operations since 1998 ===
The line from Ilmenau to Schleusingen was taken over in 2003 by Rennsteigbahn GmbH & Co KG as train operator and infrastructure owner. It maintains the line and operates privately organised museum excursions, mostly with class 94.5–17 locomotives. Regular services were operated by the Erfurter Bahn between Ilmenau and Ilmenau Bad and on the weekends from Ilmenau to Stützerbach from the commencement of the 2006 timetable. However, this was discontinued in December 2007. At the end of 2009 there were reports that operations were planned on the weekend and public holidays from Ilmenau to Rennsteig station. This announcement was renewed in April 2014 and it was announced on Mitteldeutscher Rundfunk that a trial would run from Erfurt to Rennsteig station at least until 2016.

Erfurter Bahn was to start operations on the line by extending the Erfurt–Ilmenau service to Rennsteig station every two hours on Sundays and public holidays from 15 June 2014. After Petra Enders, a member of the Landrat, had succeeded in involving neighbouring districts and transport companies in the project, Transport Minister Christian Carius refused to approve the operation because the almost parallel bus route 300 would not have been closed. The newspaper Freies Wort presumed personal animosities between Enders and Carius during the upcoming parliamentary elections was the real reason for the refusal of the proposal which had previously been supported.

On 10 June 2014, Carius, however, ultimately approved the contract for its operation and Enders announced the adjustment of bus route 300 from September 2014. Erfurter Bahn operates and markets the service under the name of RennsteigShuttle. A total of 9,476 passengers had used these trains by 26 August 2014. 1,041 bicycles had been transported.

=== Operational characteristics ===
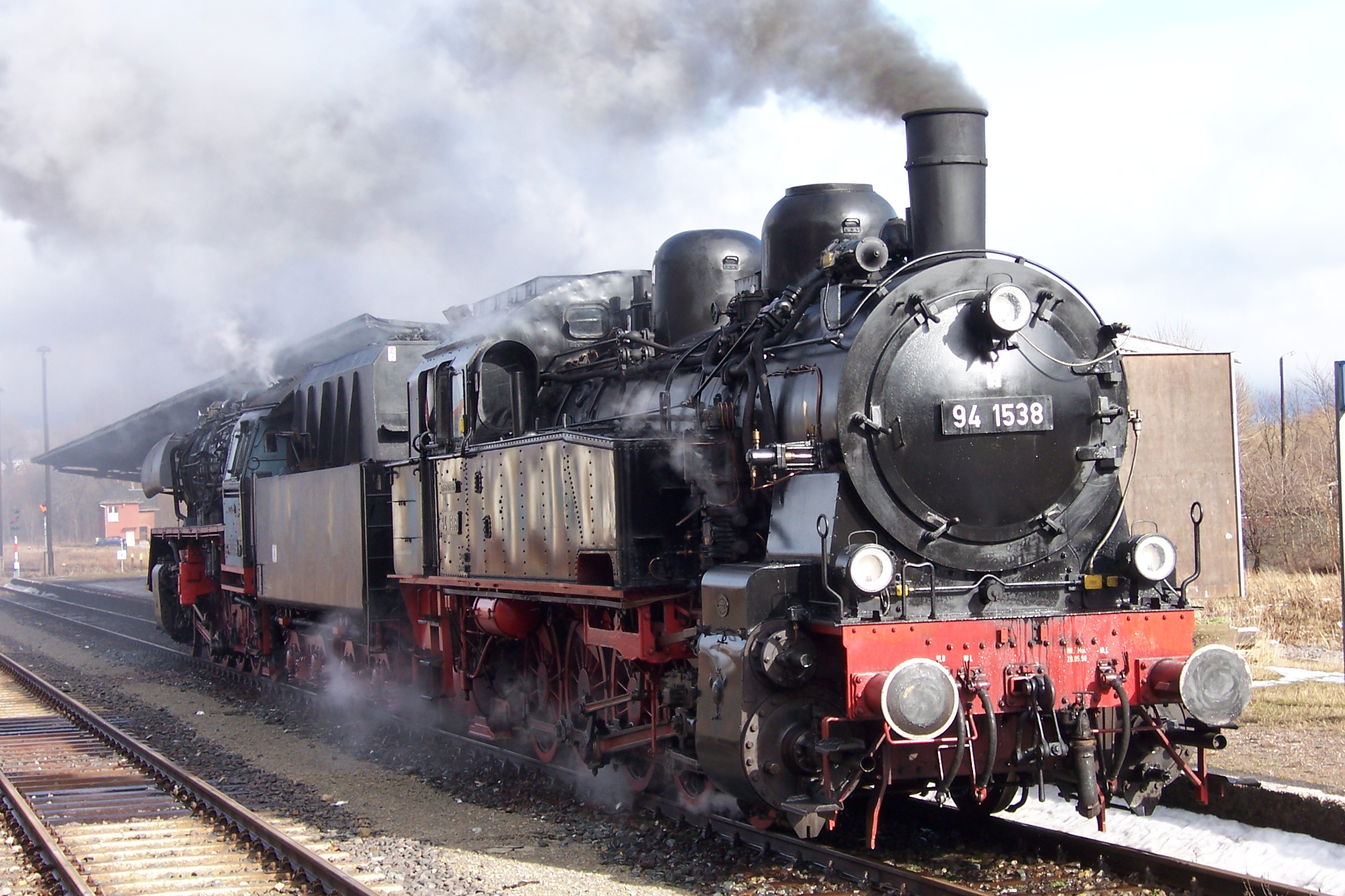
This class 94.5–17 steam locomotive is still used for special excursions

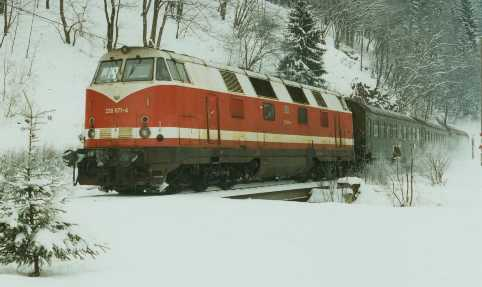
A train near Stützerbach in the winter of 1994

The route is one of the steepest adhesion railways that is still in operation in Germany. The maximum gradient is 6.12%. Until 1927, the line was partly operated using rack and pinion and was thus the first rack railway of the Prussian state railways. Toothed bars using the Abt system with two bars were laid on several sections:

- between Stützerbach and Rennsteig station for 2.12 kilometres (line-kilometre 30.81 to 32.93) at a gradient of 6.01%
- between Rennsteig and Schmiedefeld am Rennsteig for 1.2 kilometres (line-kilometre 33.93 to 35.13) at a gradient of 5.44%
- between Schmiedefeld and Thomasmühle for 1.18 kilometres (line-kilometre 35.76 to 36.94) at a gradient of 5.78% and 1.05 kilometres (line-kilometre 37.88 to 38.39) at a gradient of 6.06%
- between Schleusingen-Ost and Schleusingen for 0.75 kilometres (line-kilometre 49.24 to 49.99) at a gradient of 6.12%

The Prussian T 26 class steam locomotives always had to face the valley on the rack sections. Therefore, these trains had to have an assisting locomotive to push them uphill. In order to avoid the locomotives having to run around in Rennsteig station, where trains had to reverse, the locomotives were always placed with the chimney towards the mountain. This procedure ensured that the boiler water on the steep rack sections always stood at a sufficient height above the ceiling of the firebox.

Soon, the company was looking for alternatives to the staff and cost-intensive rack railway operations (which with the maintenance of the Prussian T 26 rack locomotives and the toothed rack sections, particularly in winter, were complex and expensive). As early as 1923, both class 94.5–17 and class 95 locomotives were tested. However, the class 95 locomotives proved to be too heavy because they damaged the rail track superstructure. The experiments with class 94.5-17 locomotives however proved satisfactory and thus the changeover to adhesion operations occurred in 1927 with steam locomotives that could operate on the rack sections (with Riggenbach counter-pressure brakes), which now also hauled the trains while facing uphill because of the comprehensive introduction of fail-safe air brakes and more powerful locomotives.

From the 1950s, the traveling coaches were mostly reinforced by a second double-decker section. From 1971, six-axle diesel locomotives of DR class V 180 (class 118) were used, which were able to haul a load of 155 t over the steepest gradient. The journey time on timetable route 622 was at least 70 minutes for the 32 kilometres between Ilmenau and Schleusingen. From 1995 onwards it was operated with class 213 locomotives.

On the steep slopes, the locomotives always required three independent braking systems. In the summer of 2006, Rennsteigbahn operated trials with class 612 (RegioSwinger) and class 650 (Regio-Shuttle) diesel multiple units, in particular to test the braking systems of these sets and their ability to handle steep grades on the line. Since the beginning of 2007, RegioSwinger sets have been able to operate to Rennsteig. On 24 March 2007, the 612 176 set first ran the line as a non-public special train to prove its suitability for Rennsteigbahn. DB Regio class 612 sets ran on the line as special excursions for the public in January 2011. The Federal Railway Authority (Eisenbahn-Bundesamt) finally granted approval for the operation of Erfurter Bahn's Regio-Shuttles on the steep grades without additional modifications on 24 January 2014 after it had been drafting a new set of rules for several years.

== Schleusingen–Themar ==
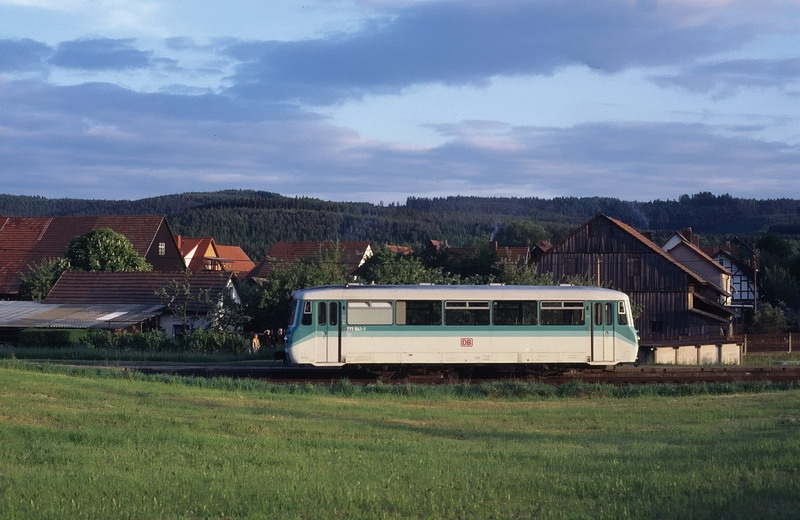
LVT class 771 at the halt of Rappelsdorf, May 1998

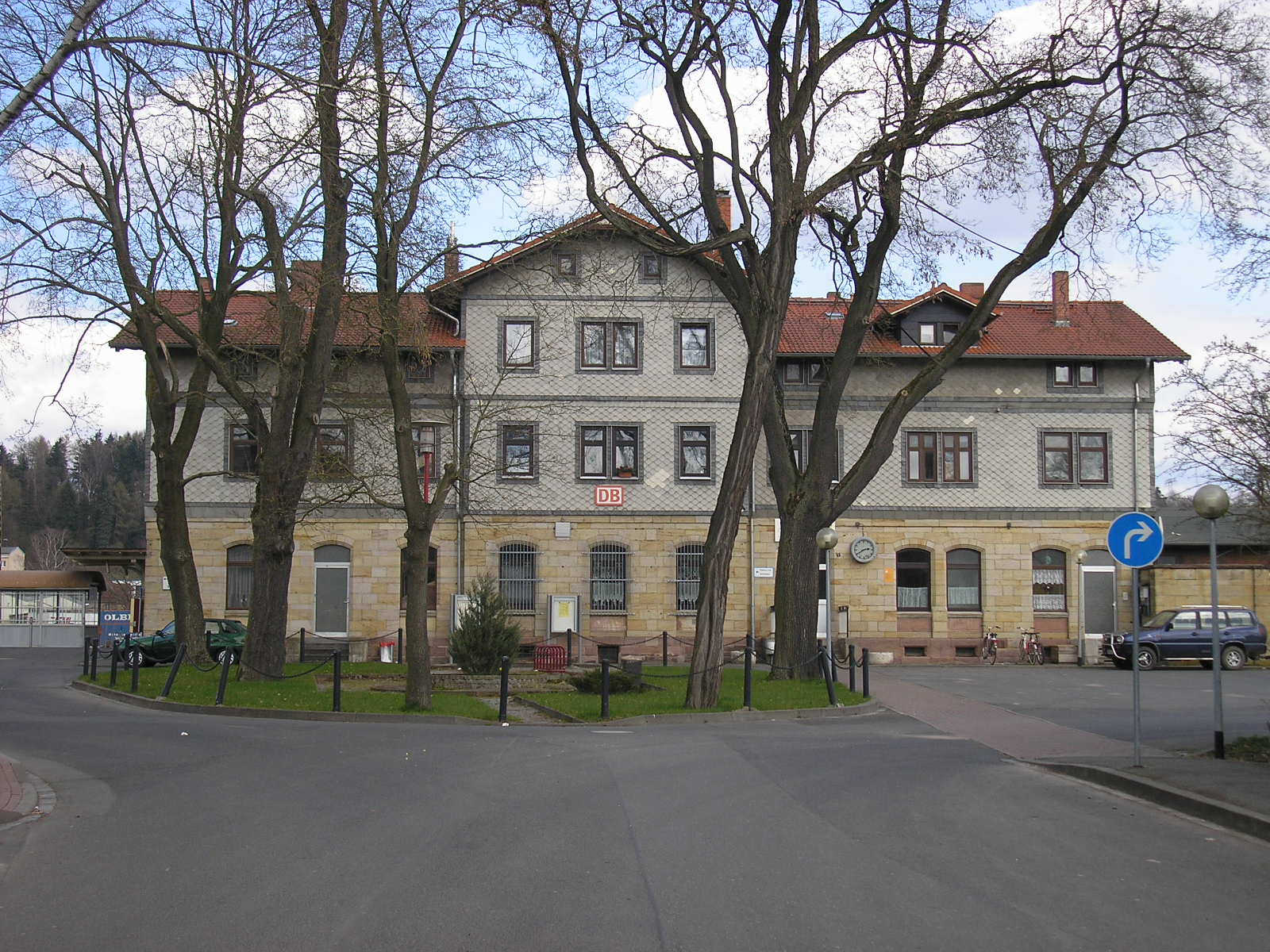
Themar station

This railway was opened in 1888 by the Werra-Eisenbahn-Gesellschaft to connect Schleusingen to the Werra Railway. This gave Schleusingen a long-awaited connection to the railway network, thereby giving an important stimulus to the economy and making possible a revitalisation of the Rennsteig region around Schmiedefeld. The former mayor of Ludwigsburg, Schleusingen, had long fought for it, just as he did later in relation to the Rennsteig Railway between Ilmenau and Schleusingen. The railway was purchased by the Prussian state railways in 1895.

Scheduled traffic was discontinued on the line on 16 June 1998. Thus Schleusingen was separated from the rail network with the closure of the Rennsteig Railway and the Suhl–Schleusingen railway a few weeks earlier on 31 May 1997.

In 2003, Rennsteigbahn GmbH rented the Rennsteig Railway along with the Schleusingen–Themar railway. Occasional special excursions are operated from Ilmenau and Stützerbach to Kloster Veßra and Themar. Occasional special excursions are also operated by Süd-Thüringen-Bahn with RegioShuttles between Themar and Schleusingen. Rennsteigbahn GmbH operates freight traffic as required. At times, timber trains have run from Schleusingen via Themar to Schweinfurt up to twice a week; some of the timber was then transported to Austria and the Czech Republic. A class 52 steam locomotive of the IGE Werrabahn Eisenach e. V. was regularly used for this timber traffic in March and April 2006.

== Rennsteigbahn GmbH & Co. KG ==
Logo of RennsteigBahn GmbH

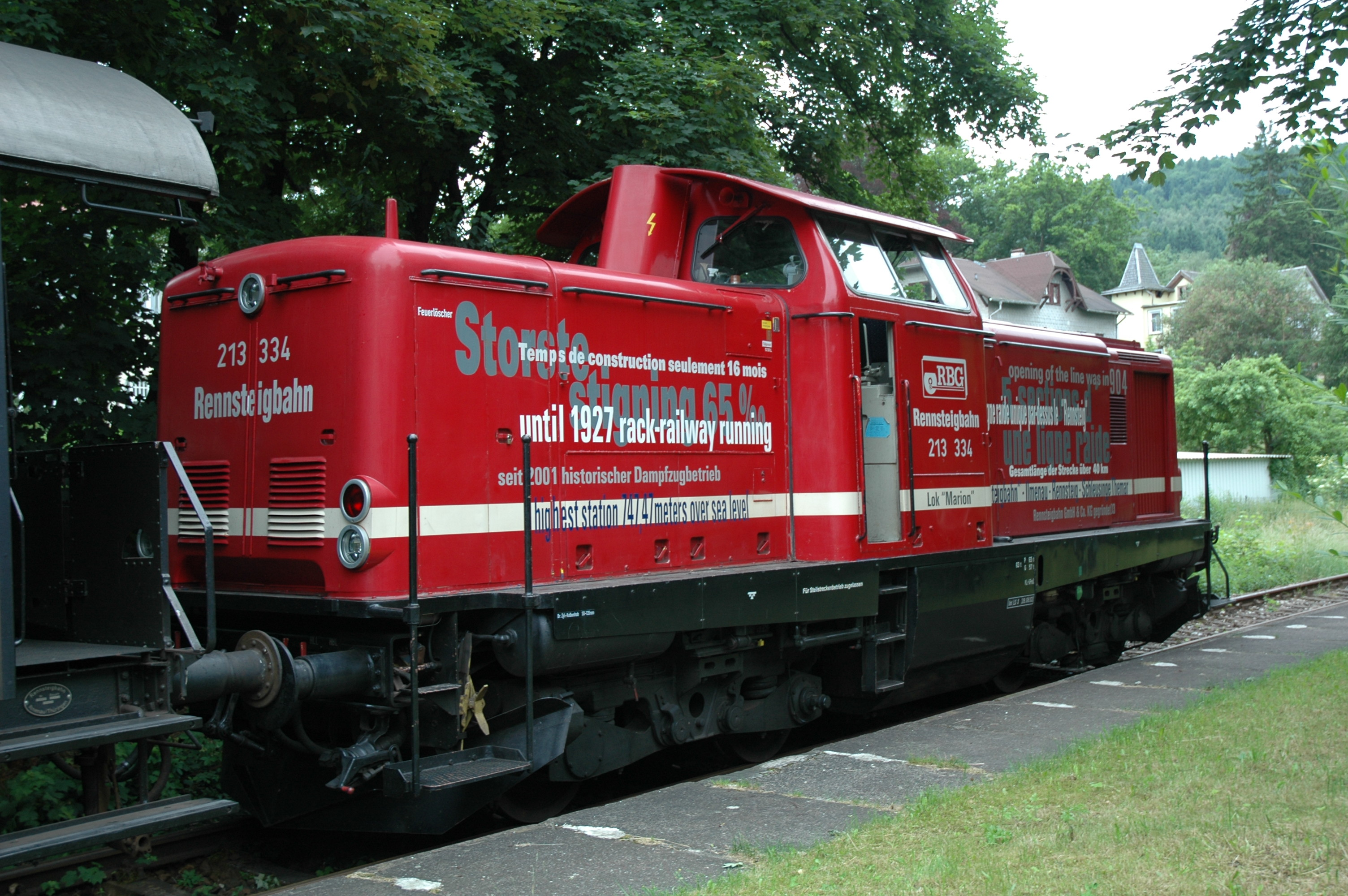
Rennsteigbahn GmbH & Co KG class 213 diesel locomotive suitable for steep track of on a tourist service in Ilmenau Bad station

Rennsteigbahn GmbH & Co KG is a private train operating and infrastructure owning company based in Schmiedefeld am Rennsteig, which is responsible for the Ilmenau–Themar and Schleusingen–Suhl lines. The company organises excursions, together with Dampfbahnfreunden mittlerer Rennsteig e. V., on the Ilmenau–Rennsteig station–Themar Nostalgiefahrten route on several weekends a year and operates freight traffic (including timber transport and waste shipments from Ilmenau to the incinerator in Leuna).
