= Plaue (disambiguation) =

Plaue may refer to:

- Plaue, a city in Ilm-Kreis, Thuringia, Germany
  - Plaue station, a railway junction
- Plaue, Brandenburg, a suburb of the city of Brandenburg an der Havel, Brandenburg, Germany
- Axel Plaue, a politician in Lower Saxony, Germany
