= Ilmenau station =

Railway station in Ilmenau, Germany

Ilmenau
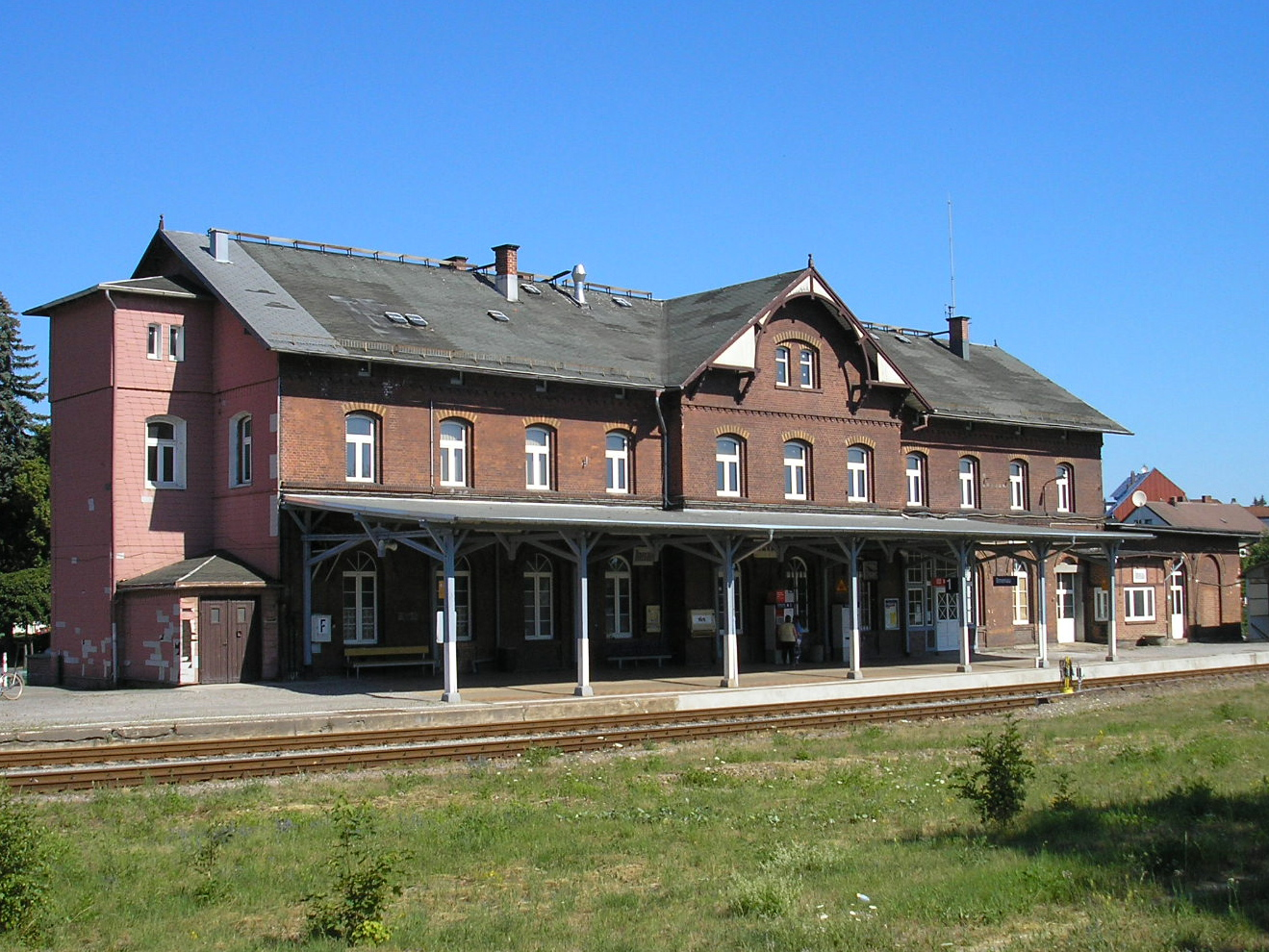
- Entrance building, trackside

General information
- Location: Am Bahndamm 10, Ilmenau, Thuringia; Germany
- Coordinates: 50°41′03″N 10°55′20″E
- Lines: Plaue–Themar; former Ilmenau–Großbreitenbach
- Platforms: 2

Construction
- Accessible: Yes
- Architectural style: Gründerzeit

Other information
- Station code: 2976
- DS100 code: UI
- IBNR: 8010178
- Category: 6
- Website: www.bahnhof.de

History
- Opened: 6 August 1879

Services
Preceding station		Following station
Terminus	RE 45	Ilmenau Pörlitzer Höhe towards Erfurt Hbf
Terminus	RB 46	Ilmenau Pörlitzer Höhe towards Erfurt Hbf
Location
- Location within Thuringia Location within Germany Location within Europe

Ilmenau station is one of four stations in the Ilmenau municipality in the German state of Thuringia. The station is referred to locally as Ilmenau Hauptbahnhof (main station), but this has never been its official name.

== Location ==
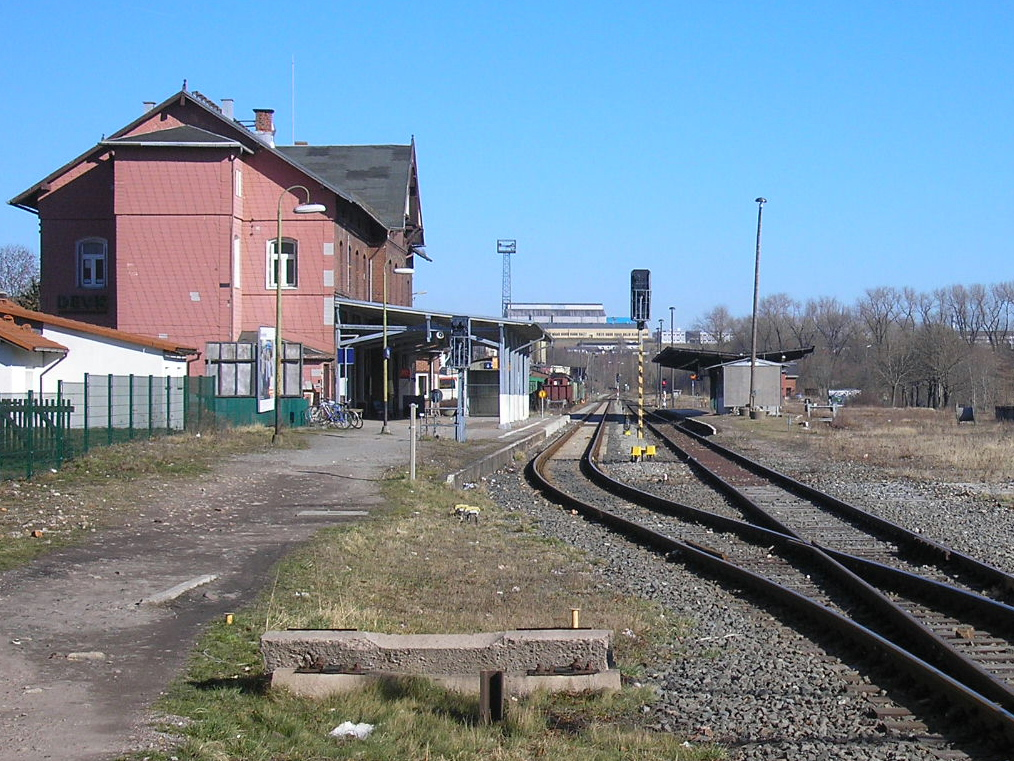
View from the south towards the station (2007)

Ilmenau station is at an altitude of 478.46 metres. It is located southeast of the town centre. To the south, it is bordered by Langewiesener Straße (the road to Langewiesen, B 88). To the east is Neuhäuser Weg, to the west in the Ilmenau main street (B 4/B 88) Friedrich-Ebert-Straße. To the north, the station area is bordered by Bücheloher Straße (B 87). The southern part the station has been raised about two metres above ground level. This used material from the cuttings at Roda.

Other stations in the town of Ilmenau are or were: Ilmenau-Pörlitzer Höhe, Ilmenau Roda, Ilmenau Bad (no scheduled services), Manebach (no scheduled services) and Grenzhammer (closed).

== History ==
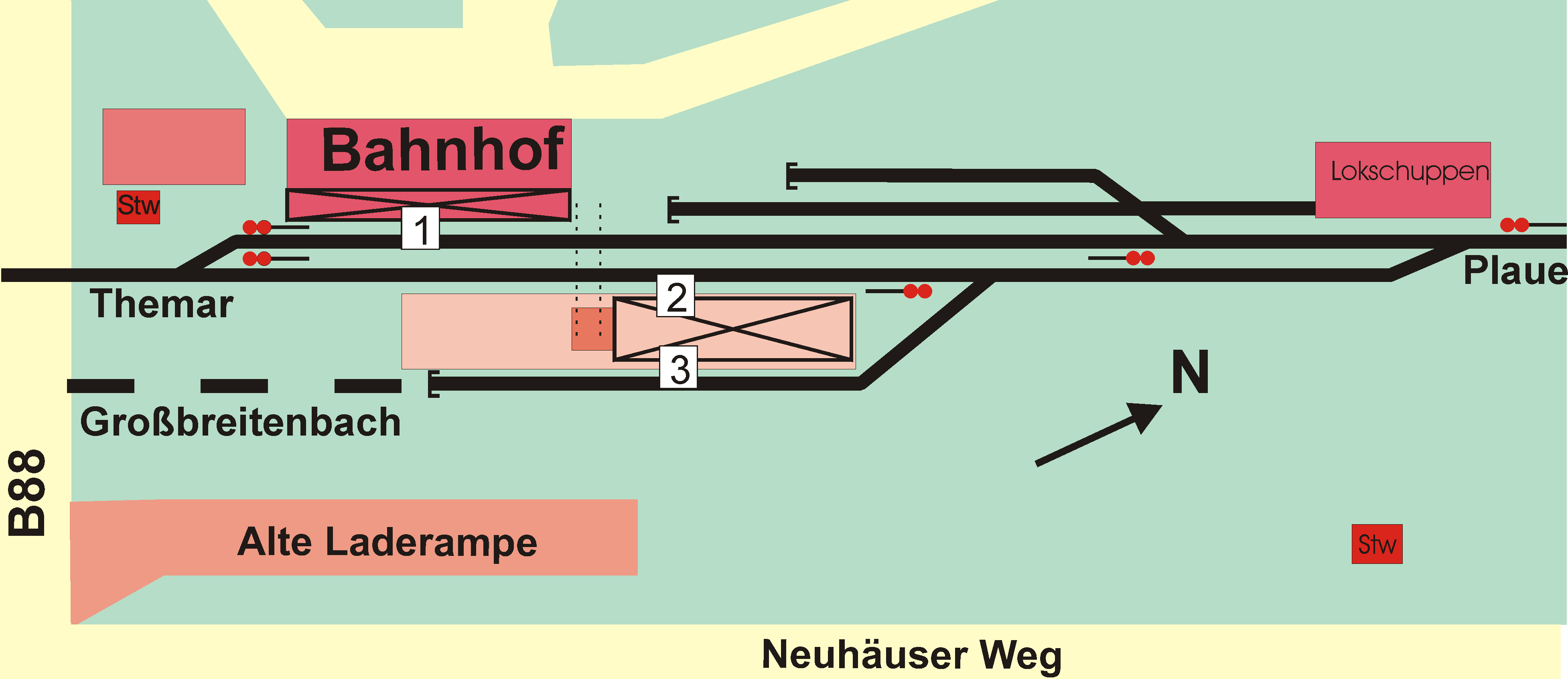
Track plan of Ilmenau station

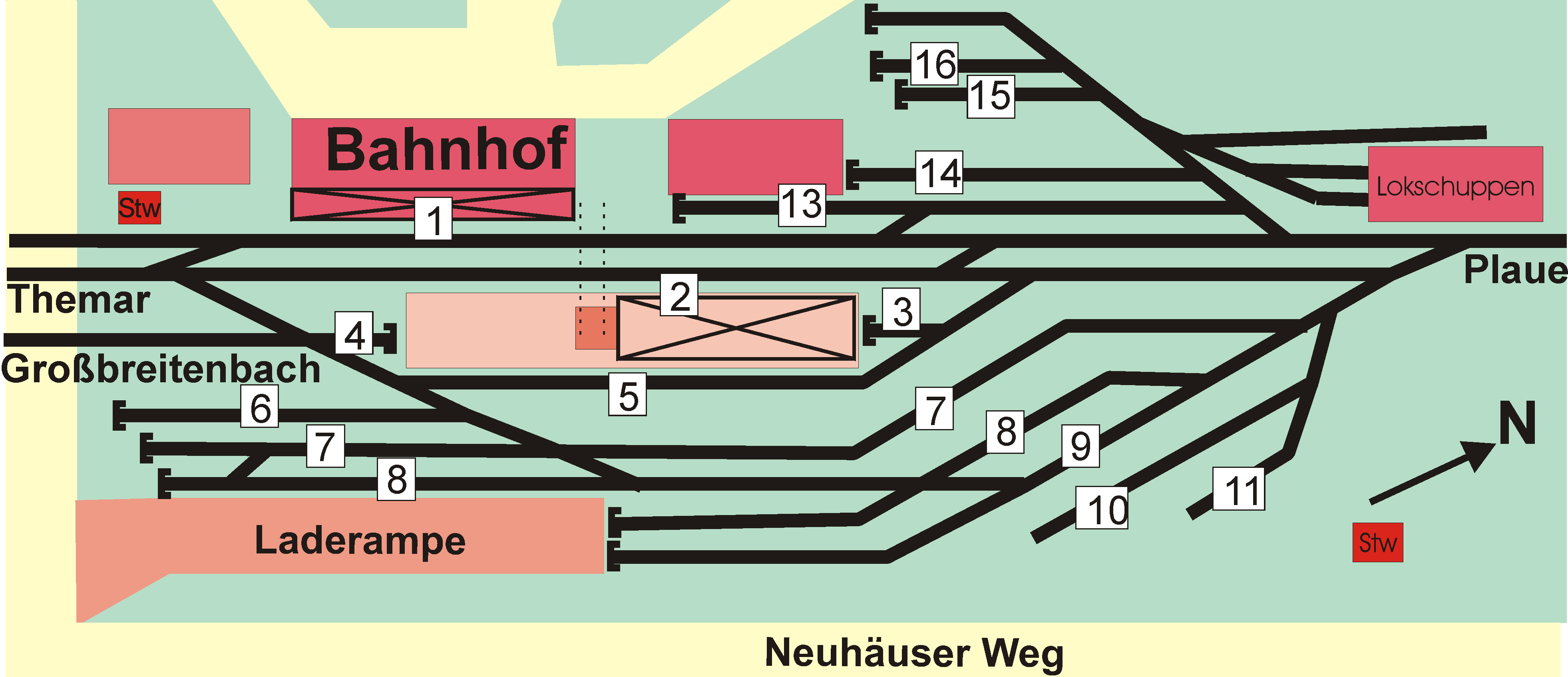
Track plan of Ilmenau station in 1928

There are currently two platforms with 3 platform faces in Ilmenau station. Platform 1 (the "house" platform) is used for travel to Erfurt, while platforms 2 and 3 (sharing an island) are no longer used by scheduled services. Steam excursions to Rennsteig operate from platform 2, but platform 3 (a bay platform) is currently not used. Two other tracks were used for freight operations to the east of the three platform tracks. These were removed about 2002, but the loading ramp is still easily recognisable. Many tracks were also formerly operated in the north-eastern part of the station for marshalling and freight traffic. Three factory sidings branched off directly from the station: one ran to the slaughterhouse, another to the Porzellanfabrik Galluba & Hofmann (porcelain factory on Neuhäuser Weg) and the third ran for about two kilometres to the Graf von Henneberg Porzellan Ilmenau (another porcelain factory). It was laid down only in 1973 and included another freight yard with several tracks to the north of the station. The construction of a new freight yard started in the 1970s, which was located to the east of the station on Neuhäuser Weg. In 2006, there was a large open-air area with railway tracks and station lighting systems. There are plans to convert the area into an industrial park.

On the area between track 3 and Langewiesener Straße (former track of the line to Großbreitenbach), platform 2 was rebuilt from July to November 2019 over a length of 95 m (312 ft) with a height of 550 mm (22 in). This has barrier-free access via Langewiesener Straße. The platform on track 3 was dismantled. The underpass to the new platform was also renovated.

=== Platforms ===
Platform	Length in m	Height in cm	Use
1	90	55	Local trains
2	95	55	Local trains, special services

== Connecting lines ==
Ilmenau station is located at line-kilometre 19.18 (distance calculated from Plaue) of the Arnstadt–Ilmenau railway, which was opened in 1879 and was extended to Themar in 1904. It runs through the station from north to south. In addition the Ilmenau–Großbreitenbach railway (Ilmenau-Großbreitenbacher Eisenbahn) was opened in 1881 and closed in 1997. This ran south-east from the station.

== Station building ==
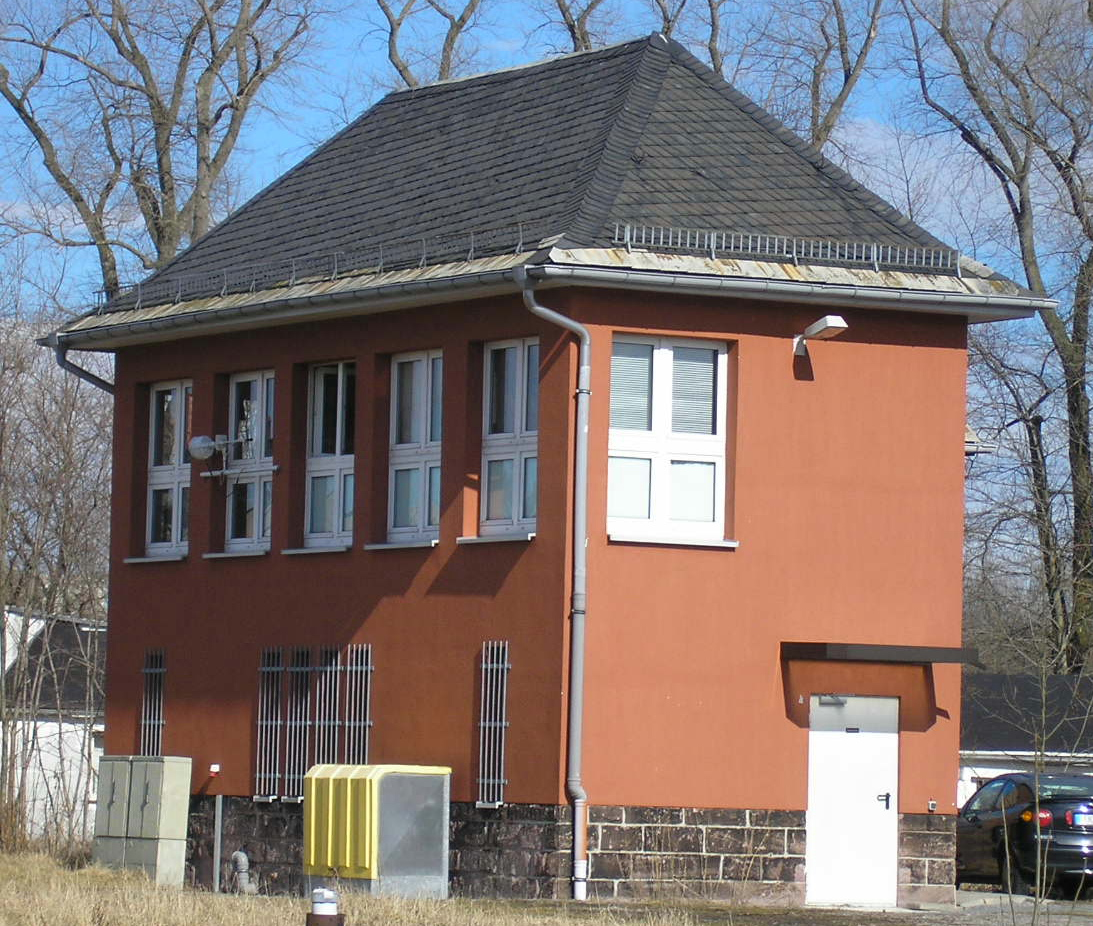
Northern signal box

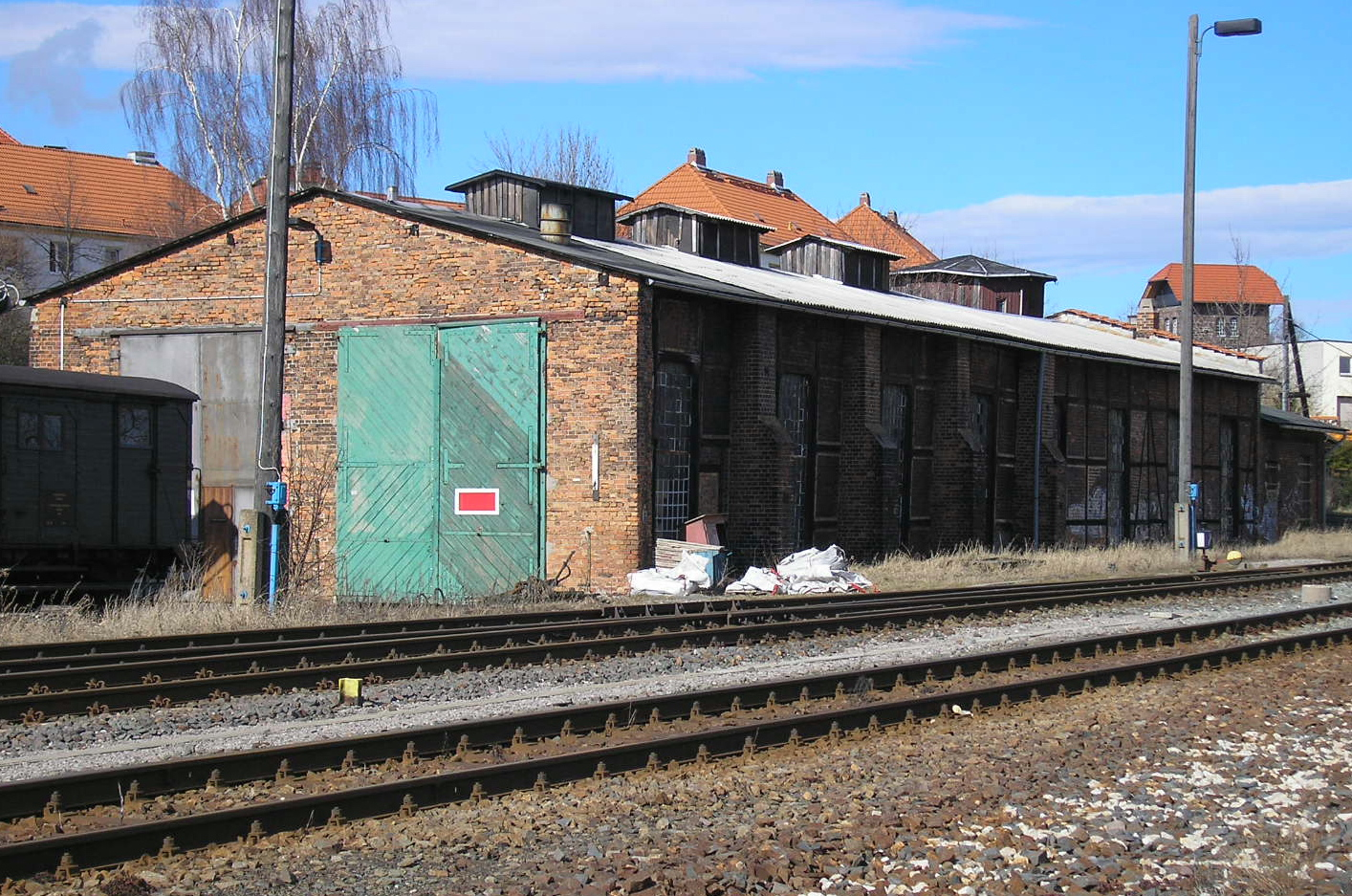
The locomotive shed

Ilmenau station was built by the Prussian state railways in 1879 as a relatively simple, red brick building typical of the time. The three-storey building is very similar to the station buildings of Elgersburg, Plaue and above all Arnstadt. In the 1920s, an entrance hall was erected on the street side, but it was well adapted to the building. In GDR times, the western side of the station was covered with red asbestos shingles, which disrupted the originally uniform brick architecture. After the station building was unused between 1998 and 2005, a Deutsche Bahn Servicecenter was opened in autumn 2005, but this was closed in 2008.

A locomotive shed for four locomotives in the north-western station area and the north and south signal boxes were added. When the Rennsteig Railway was opened in 1904, two platforms and a platform subway were added. Later, the subway was extended to platform 2/3, which is now closed due to dilapidation. A long goods shed that joined to the north of the station building was built, but it was demolished in the 1990s and the area is now used for a car park.

In the summer of 2010, after the city bought the reception building, the reconstruction and renovation (called Terminal A of the Ilmenau Technology Terminal) began. This was supplemented by a two-story extension in the northern area designed in modern glass architecture and a staircase as a southern extension. In the second construction phase, a commercial building was added to the south of the staircase by 2013 (called Terminal B). The renovation of the main building and the construction of the extension were followed by a redesign of the surrounding area and forecourt, which was completed in spring 2014. The reception building currently houses a waiting room, a taxi service, a bicycle shop and various offices. In December 2017, the South Thuringia Railway opened a ticket office in the station, as planned in the tender for the South Thuringia diesel network. In July 2017, construction of another commercial building (called Terminal C) began east of the reception building, which was opened in January 2019 together with a connecting bridge over the railway tracks to Terminal A, which is not open to the public.

== Rail services ==
=== Current passenger services ===
20 services are currently operated daily with Stadler-Regio-Shuttles in double sets (150 seats and room for 180 standees) from Ilmenau station, which take about an hour to reach Erfurt Hauptbahnhof. They are operated every hour by Erfurter Bahn, although there are no services at night between 1:00 am and 4:00 am. These services start and end at the station. Passenger numbers vary between 800 and 1000 per day.

Railway traffic continues to play an important role in Ilmenau, as many of the 7,000 students at the Technical University travel by train. Since 2009, the student of the Technical University of Ilmenau and other Thuringian universities can use the Semesterticket Thüringen on all regional rail services in Thuringia for €49 per semester.

=== Current freight operations ===
Until 2016, garbage was loaded on freight trains by Rennsteigbahn in Ilmenau and transported to the waste incineration plant in Leuna. In addition to the daily garbage traffic, the Deponie Wolfsberg (Wolfsberg landfill) near Wümbach is also slowly being transferred. There are also occasional trains carrying timber that pass through Ilmenau on the way out of the Thuringian Forest. V 100 diesel locomotives are usually used for hauling freight trains.

== Station forecourt ==
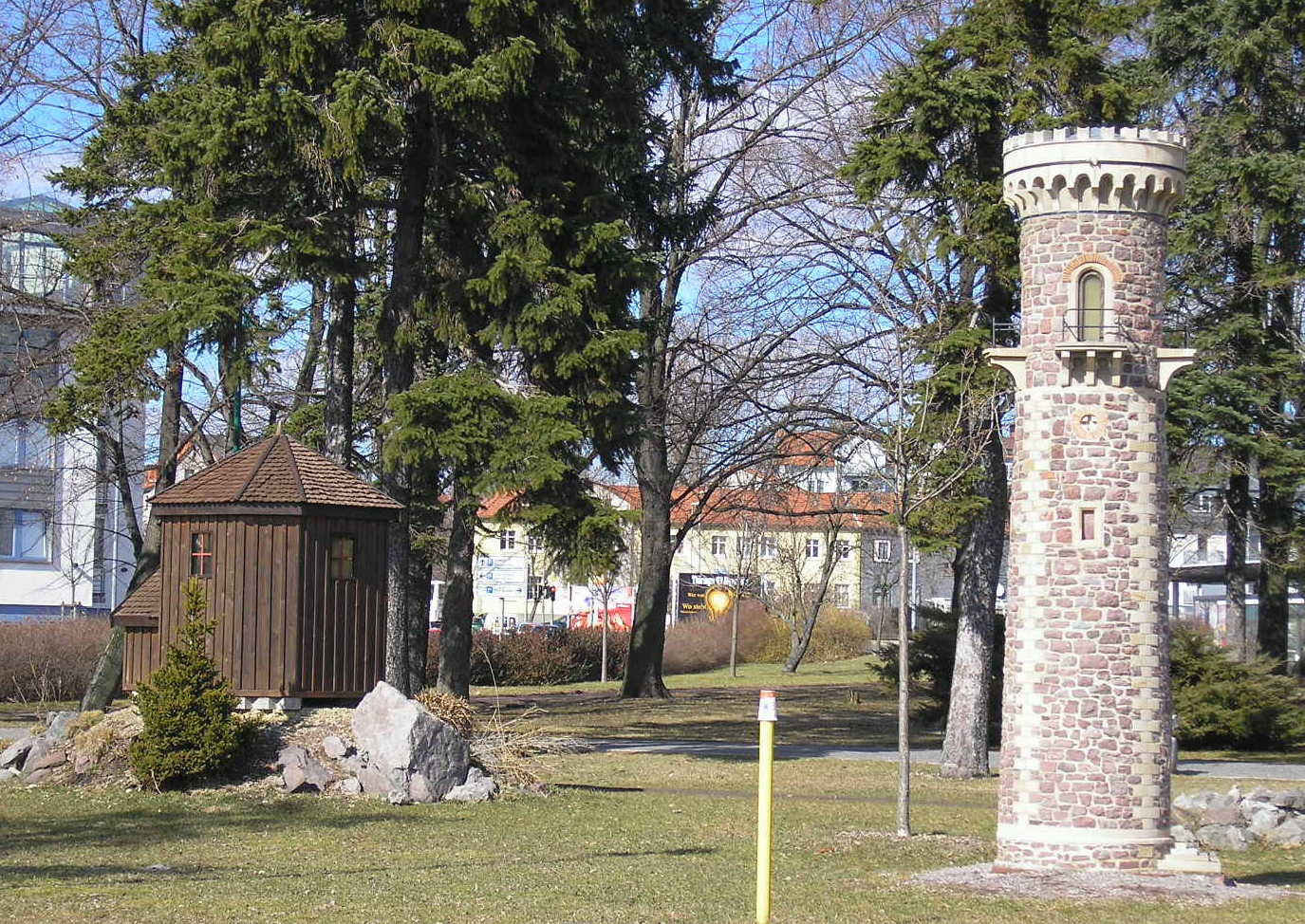
Replicas of a Kickelhahn tower and Goethehäuschen (Goethe's cabin) in the station forecourt

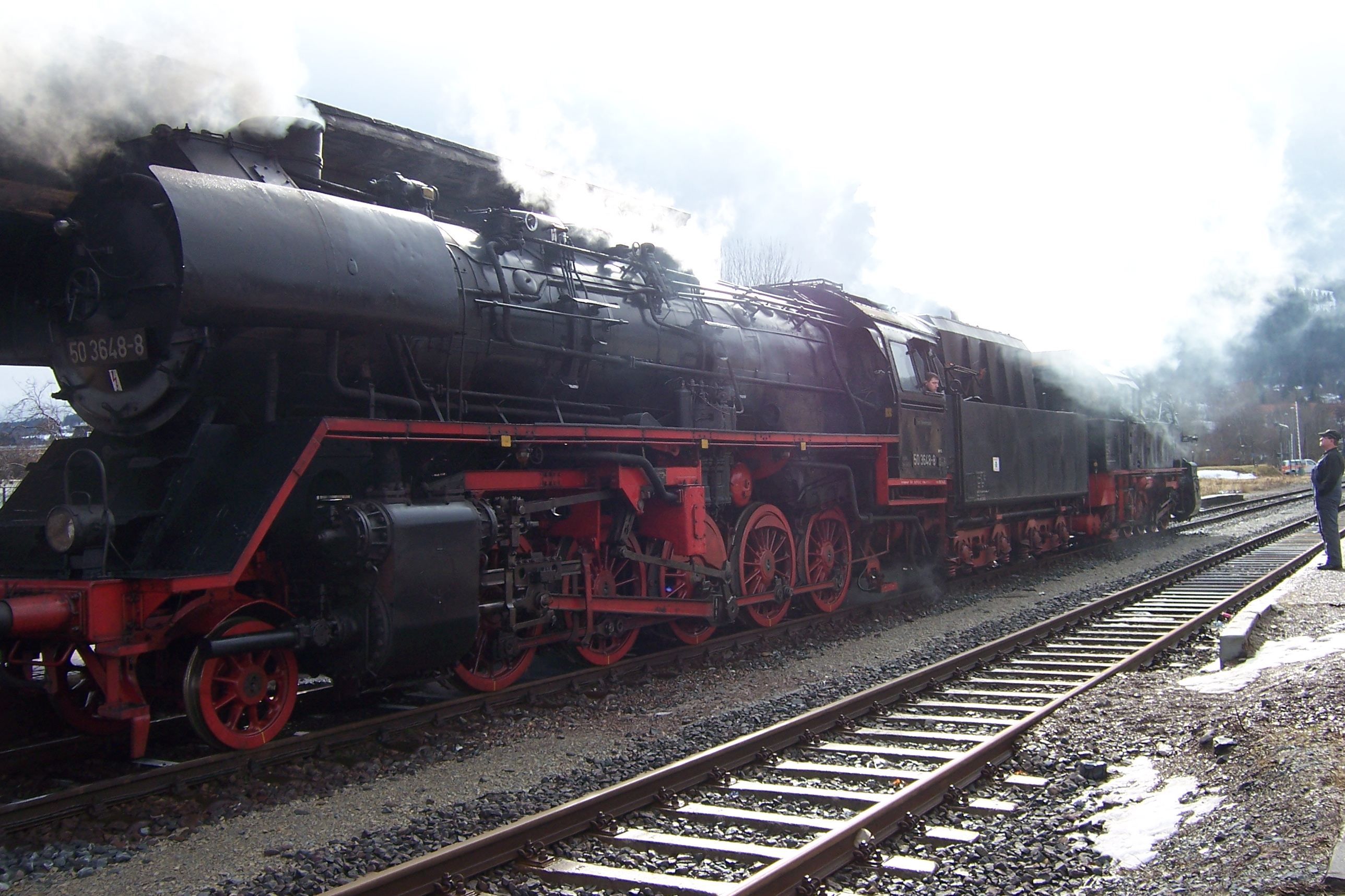
Steam engine during a special excursion to Rennsteig in Ilmenau station

The Ilmenau station forecourt was redesigned in 2000. The area has been laid out for traffic, along with a 50-metre-wide and 200 metre-long park. There are some old trees, hedges, meadows and flowerbeds. As "a welcome sign" all travellers who leave the station are greeted by miniature replicas of a Kickelhahn tower and the Goethehäuschen (Goethe's cabin). There is a taxi stand directly in front of the station. To the right there is the bus station, which was redesigned at the end of 1999.

The bus station is located on the northern part of the station forecourt and has six bus platforms as well as a covered waiting area for passengers and parking for buses. It is served daily by about 300 buses. The bus station is a public transport node for the south of the Ilm district.

As part of the station renovations until 2014, the area around the station was also refurbished. The platform, the cobblestone pavement of the forecourt, pedestrian paths and parking lots were partly re-laid.
