= Reichenbach (Zahme Gera) =

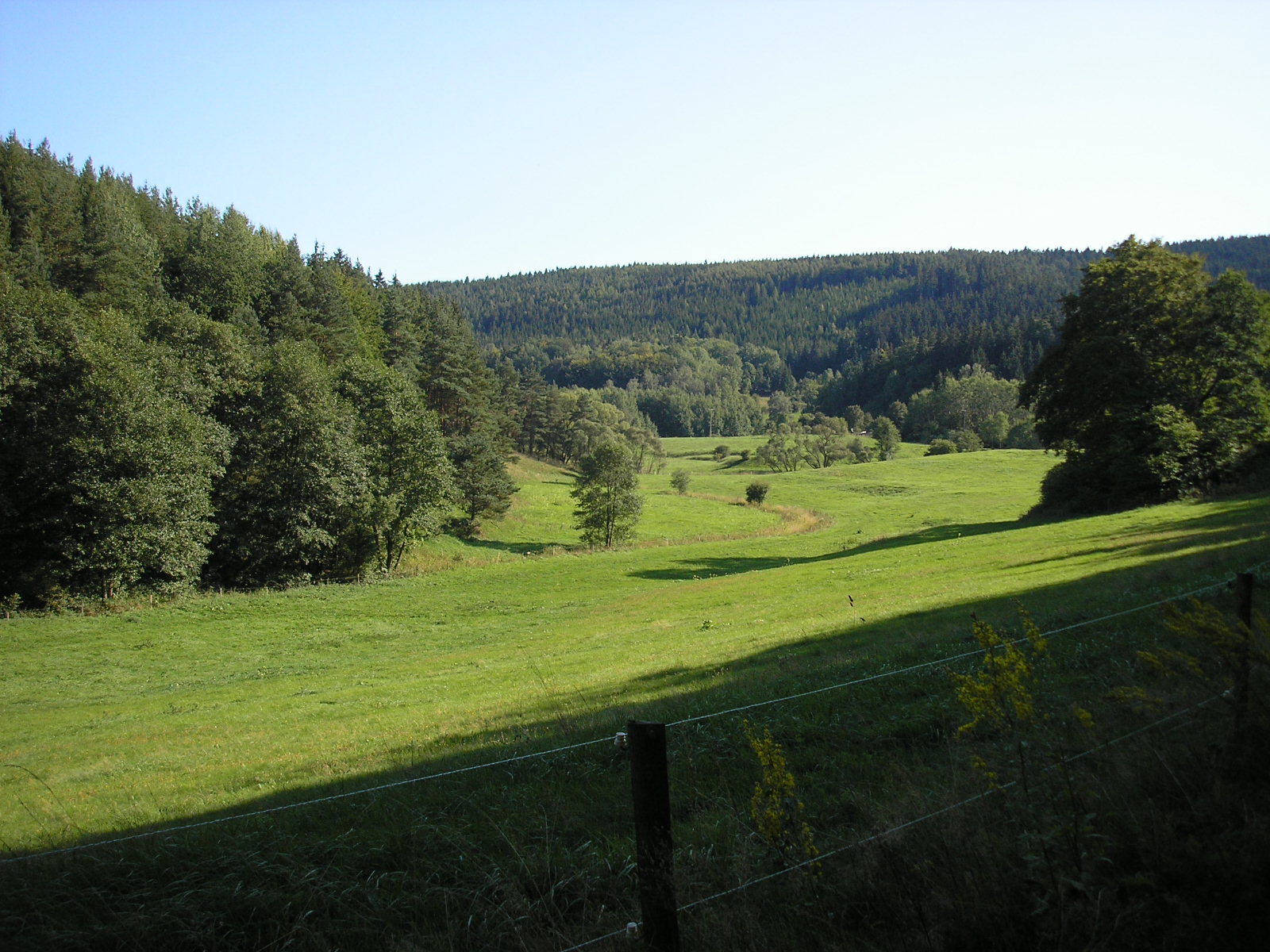

Location
- Country: Germany
- States: Thuringia

Physical characteristics
- Mouth
  - location: Zahme Gera
  - coordinates: 50.7668°N 10.8988°E

Basin features
- Progression: Zahme Gera→ Gera→ Unstrut→ Saale→ Elbe→ North Sea

Reichenbach is a river of Thuringia, Germany. It flows into the Zahme Gera near Plaue.

== See also ==
- List of rivers of Thuringia
