= Neusiß =

- Ortsteil of Plaue
- Interactive map of Neusiß
- Location within Germany Location within Thuringia
- Coordinates: 50°44′44″N 10°53′17″E
- Country: Germany
- State: Thuringia
- District: Ilm-Kreis
- Town: Plaue

Area
  - Total: 4.5 km^{2} (1.7 sq mi)
- Elevation: 400 m (1,300 ft)

Population (2017-12-31)
  - Total: 214
  - Density: 48/km^{2} (120/sq mi)
- Time zone: UTC+01:00 (CET)
  - Summer (DST): UTC+02:00 (CEST)
- Postal codes: 99338
- Dialling codes: 036207
- Vehicle registration: IK
- Website: eratal.de

Neusiß (German pronunciation: [ˈnɔʏzɪs]) is a village and a former municipality in the district Ilm-Kreis, in Thuringia, Germany. Since 1 January 2019, it is part of the town Plaue.
