= Zahme Gera =

River in Germany

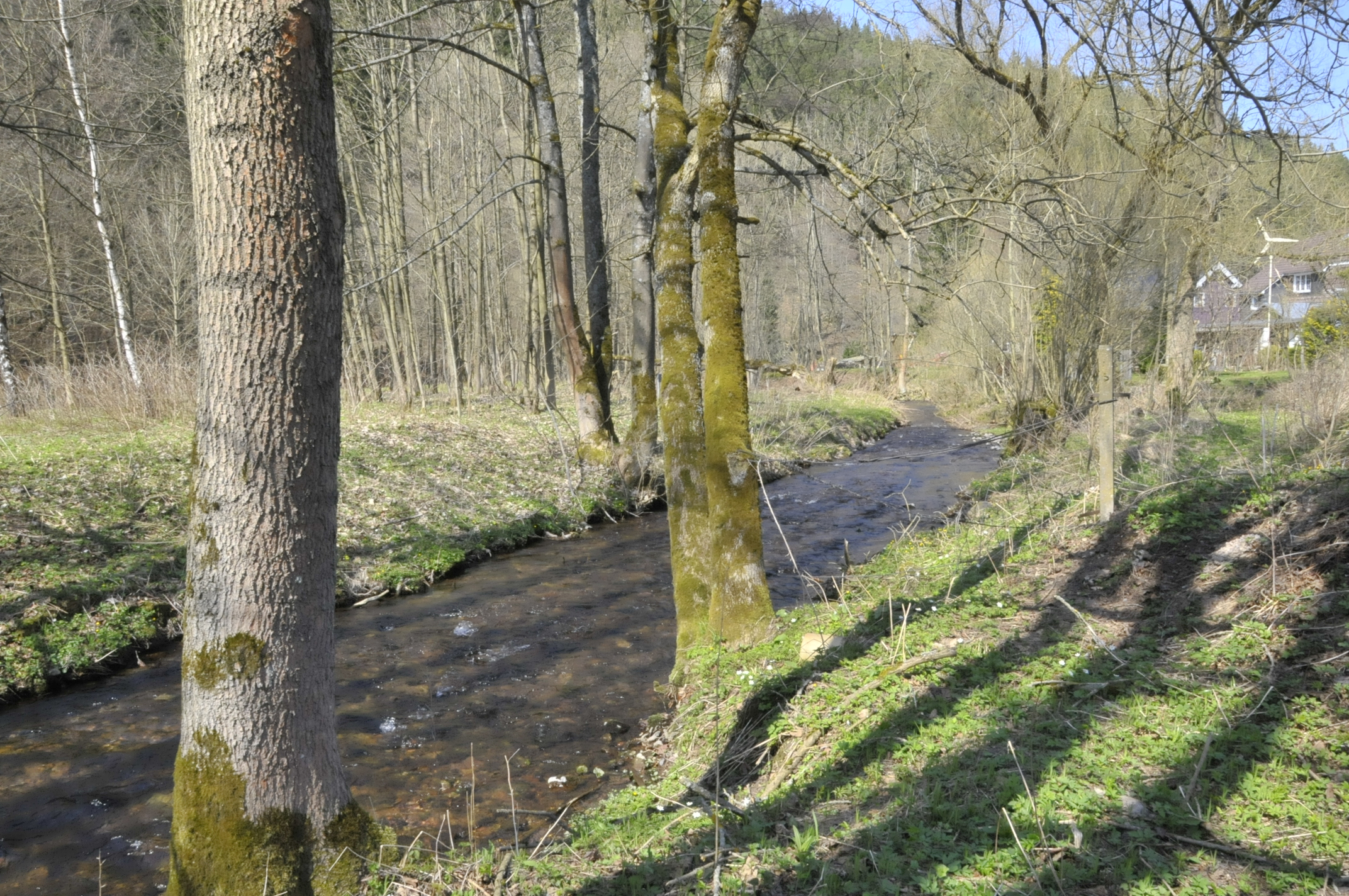

Location
- Country: Germany
- State: Thuringia

Physical characteristics
- Mouth
  - location: Gera
  - coordinates: 50.7751°N 10.8959°E

Basin features
- Progression: Gera→ Unstrut→ Saale→ Elbe→ North Sea

Zahme Gera (German pronunciation: [ˈtsaːmə ˈɡeːʁa], lit. 'Tame Gera') is a river of Thuringia, Germany. At its confluence with the Wilde Gera in Plaue, the Gera is formed.

== See also ==
- List of rivers of Thuringia
