= Plaue station =

Railway station in Plaue, Germany

Plaue (Thür)
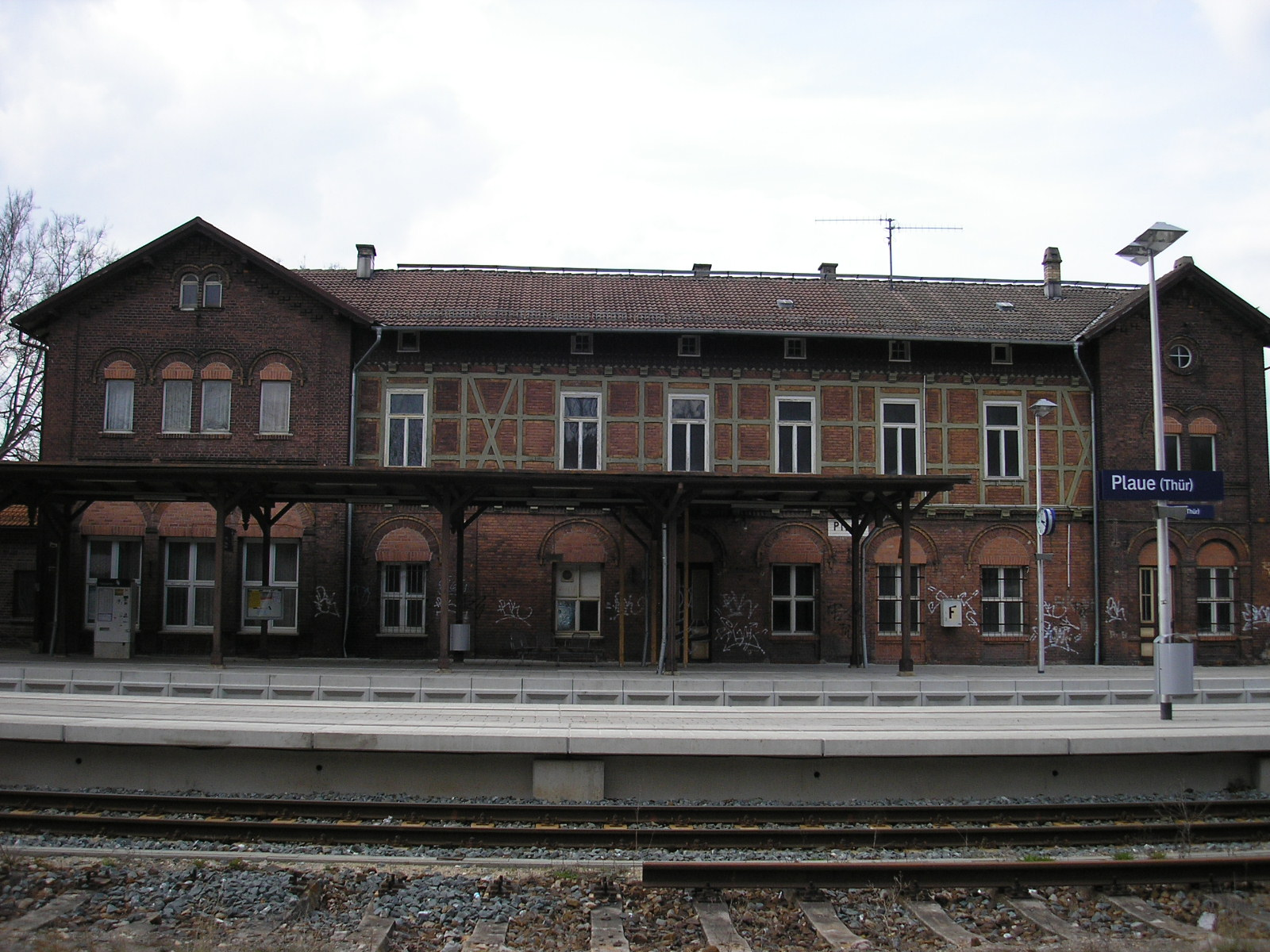
- Entrance building

General information
- Location: Am Bahnhof 1, Plaue, Thuringia; Germany
- Coordinates: 50°46′42″N 10°54′31″E
- Lines: Neudietendorf–Ritschenhausen; Plaue–Themar
- Platforms: 3

Construction
- Accessible: Platform 1 only

Other information
- Station code: 4954
- DS100 code: UPL
- IBNR: 8010274
- Category: 5
- Website: www.bahnhof.de

History
- Opened: 1879

Services
Preceding station	DB Regio Südost	Following station
Arnstadt Hbf towards Erfurt Hbf	RE 7	Zella-Mehlis towards Würzburg Hbf
Preceding station		Following station
Gräfenroda towards Meiningen	RE 50	Arnstadt Süd towards Erfurt Hbf
Gräfenroda towards Meiningen	RB 44	Arnstadt Süd towards Erfurt Hbf
Martinroda towards Ilmenau	RB 46	Arnstadt Süd towards Erfurt Hbf
Location
- Location within Thuringia Location within Germany Location within Europe

Plaue (Thür) station is a junction station in the town of Plaue in the German state of Thuringia.

It lies at the junction of the Erfurt–Würzburg and Erfurt–Ilmenau(–Themar) railways. The line is double-track towards Erfurt, but the lines towards Würzburg and Ilmenau are single-track.

== History ==
The station was built in 1879 when the railway line from Arnstadt to Ilmenau was built. The Würzburg line was added in 1884.

Originally the section in the Brandleite Tunnel between the stations of Gehlberg and Oberhof line to Würzburg was double-track. After the Second World War, the second track of the section of the Neudietendorf–Meiningen on the line in the Brandleite Tunnel between the stations of Gehlberg and Oberhofon was dismantled for reparations to the Soviet Union. At the beginning of the 1980s, the heavily used Neudietendorf–Plaue railway was redoubled and electrification was extended to Arnstadt, but the overhead wire was dismantled after the reunification of Germany. The planned further electrification failed because the GDR was not able to build a power station to supply the railway.

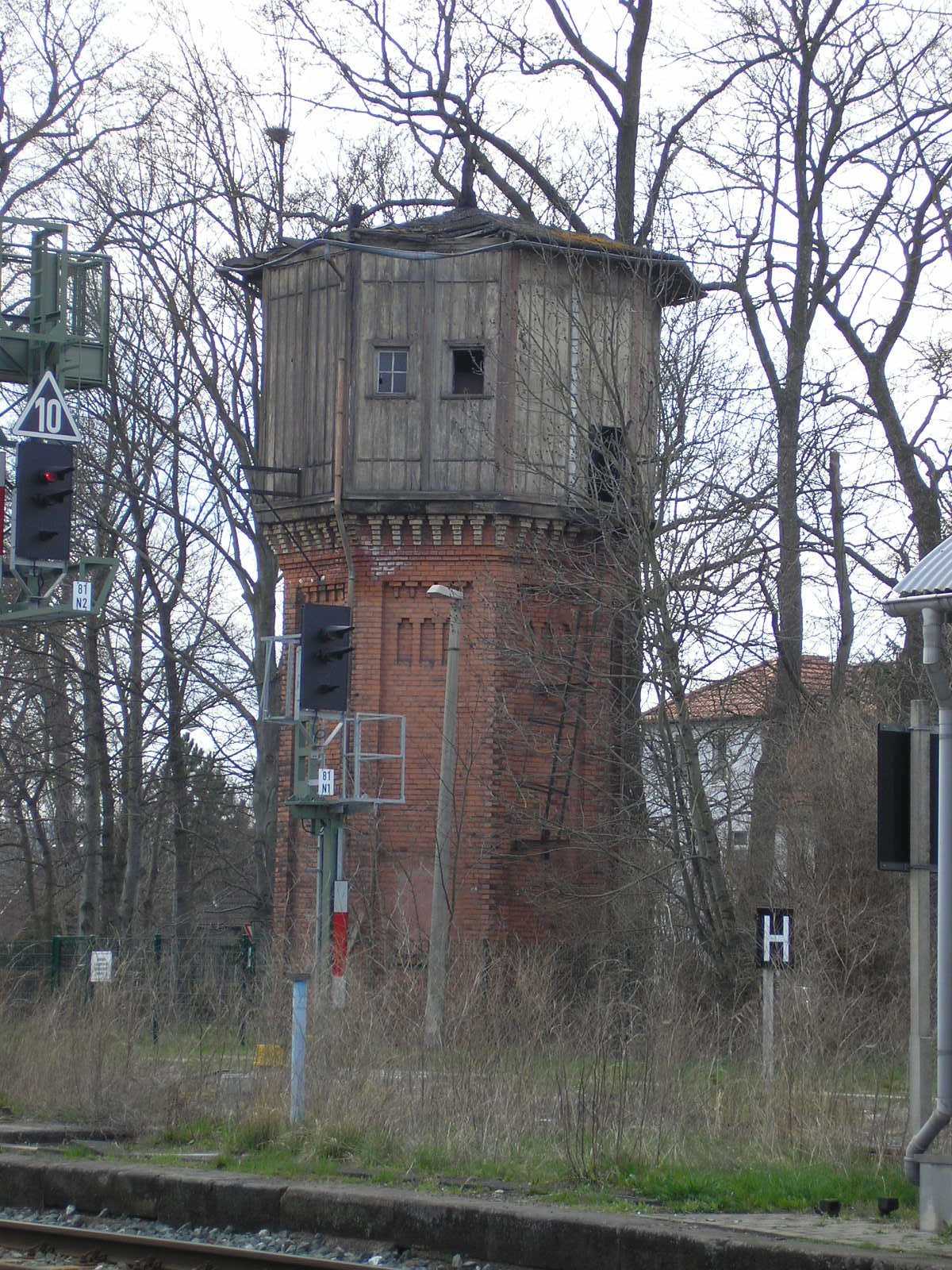
Station water tower

Freight operations at Plaue station ended in the 1970s. The siding to Dosdorf brickyard was also closed and dismantled during this time. Shunting operations were discontinued in the 1980s and the tracks to the freight shed were dismantled. However, it was still possible to consign even bulky goods on DR. These were loaded into wagons attached to passenger trains. From the 1990s onwards, the railway tracks were rebuilt several times. Of the original ten tracks in the station, only three now exist.

The station was renovated in 2005 as part of the redevelopment of the Erfurt–Würzburg line to accommodate 140 km/h (87 mph) operations and tilting technology. The station building was privatised in 2012 and has been reused as a student residence with 20 apartments.

== Operations ==
In the 2025 timetable Plaue station was served by the following lines:

Line	Route	Frequency (mins)
RE 7	Erfurt – Arnstadt – Plaue – Suhl – Schweinfurt – Würzburg	120
RE 45	Erfurt – Arnstadt Hbf – Plaue – Ilmenau	Some trains
RE 50	Erfurt – Arnstadt – Plaue – Suhl – Meiningen	Some trains
RB 44	Erfurt – Neudietendorf – Arnstadt – Plaue – Suhl – Grimmenthal – Meiningen	120
RB 46	Erfurt – Neudietendorf – Arnstadt – Plaue – Ilmenau (– Rennsteig)	60

Trains on the RE 45 Erfurt–Ilmenau line pass through Plaue station without stopping. Until December 2017, the regional trains towards Meiningen and Ilmenau were split in the station or combined towards Erfurt. The Süd-Thüringen-Bahn services are operated with Stadler Regio-Shuttle diesel railcars and the DB Regio service is operated with Bombardier RegioSwinger diesel multiple units.

== Platforms ==
The station is located in the east of the town centre between Plaue and Kleinbreitenbach. It has three platforms: platform 1 is used by trains to Würzburg, platform 2 is used by trains to Erfurt and platform 3 is used by trains to Ilmenau, Würzburg and Erfurt. Platforms 2 and 3 are accessible via an underpass.

Platform	Length in m	Height in cm
1	160	55
2	160	55
3	190	55
