= Kickelhahn =

Mountain in Ilmenau, Germany

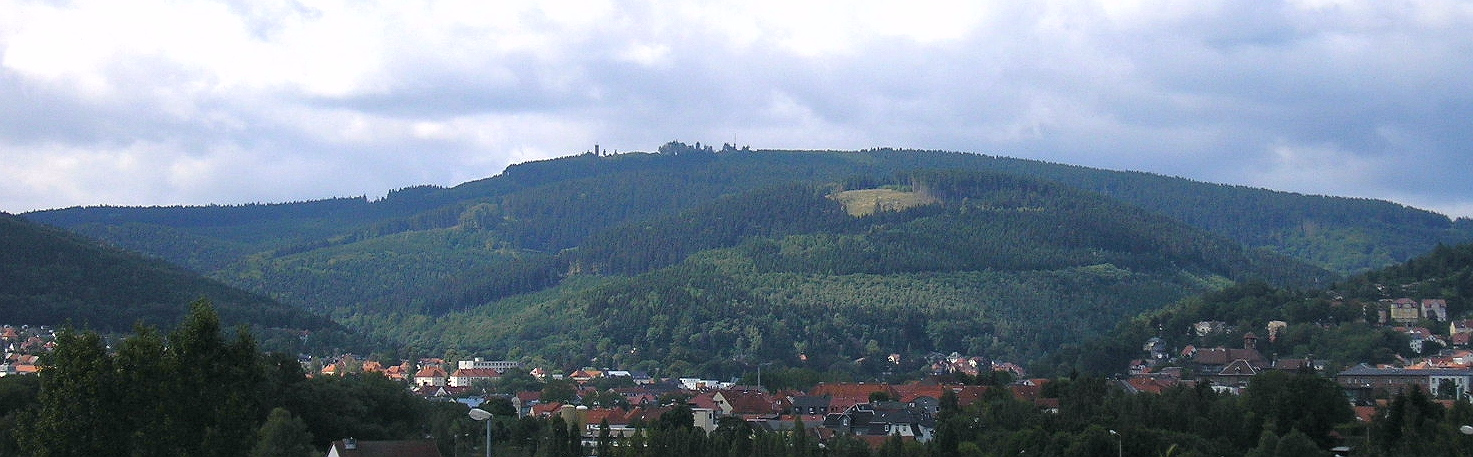

Highest point
- Elevation: 861.1 m above sea level (NHN) (2,825 ft)
- Prominence: 145 m (476 ft)
- Isolation: 5.8 km (3.6 mi)
- Coordinates: 50°39′56″N 10°52′53″E

Geography
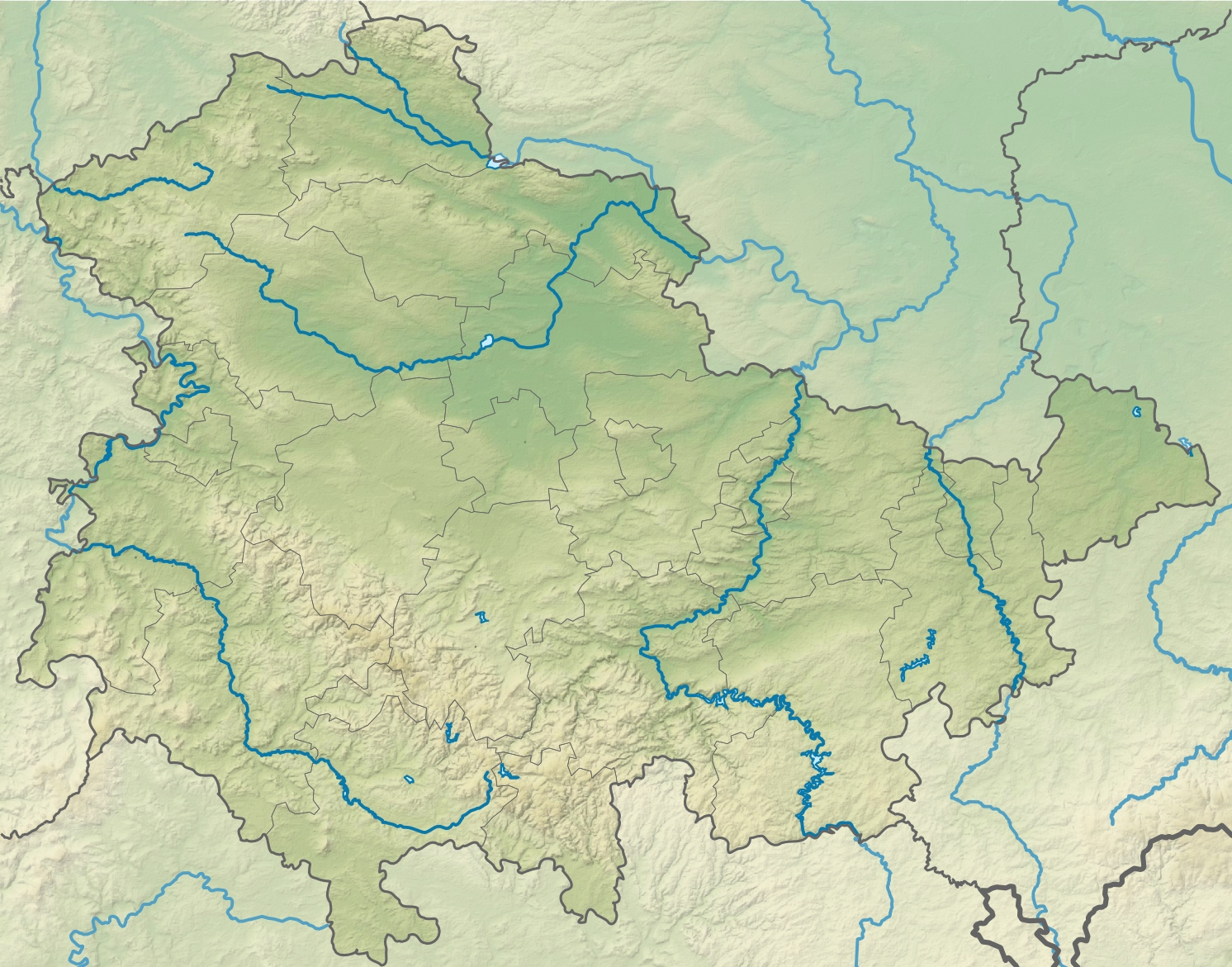
- Location within Thuringia
- Location: Thuringia, Germany
- Parent range: Thuringian Forest

Kickelhahn is a mountain in the northern edge of the Central Thuringian Forest in the municipal area of Ilmenau, Germany. Its summit has an altitude of 861.1 metres (2,825 ft) a.s.l.

== Geography ==
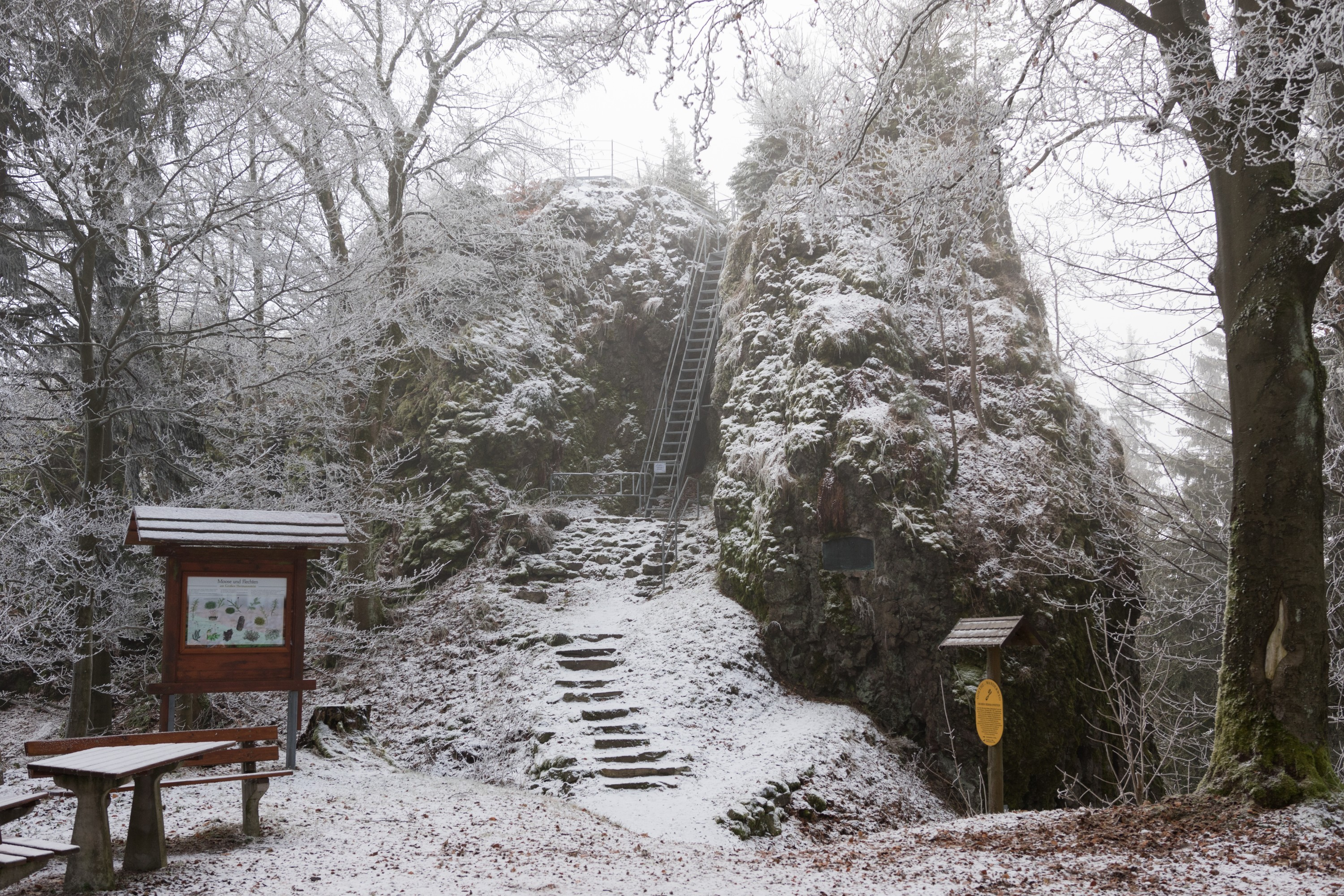
Großer Hermannstein

Kickelhahn is the highest point in the municipal area of Ilmenau and is situated about 3.3 km (2.1 mi) southwest of the town centre, 2 km (1.2 mi) from Manebach and 4 km (2.5 mi) from Stützerbach. Its summit rises about 400 m above the valley of Ilm river. Historically, it was also the highest point of Saxe-Weimar-Eisenach.

Its massif extends over about 4 km (2.5 mi) in the north-south direction and 3 km (1.9 mi) in the east-west direction. It is situated between the valleys of the rivers Ilm in the west and the north, Gabelbach in the east and Langebach in the south, so that the mountain is part of the Ilm catchment area. Some minor streams have their sources on Kickelhahn. An about 750 m high saddle in the southeast between the sources of Gabelbach and Langebach forms a pass between Kickelhahn and neighbouring Hohe Tanne (850 m a.s.l.). Secondary summits in the Kickelhahn massif include Hohe Schlaufe (735 m), Gabelbachskopf (704 m), and Dachskopf (686 m). Großer Hermannstein and Kleiner Hermannstein are notable rock formations northwest of the summit.

The mountain is completely wooded, with trees on the summit being shaped by the wind. The forest is dominated by spruce monocultures and is property of Ilmenau town. Storms like Kyrill have repeatedly caused major damage to the forest.

Geologically, Kickelhahn consists mostly of porphyric igneous rocks. Coal has been mined on its western flank in Manebach episodically from 1732 until 1945.

== History and cultural significance ==
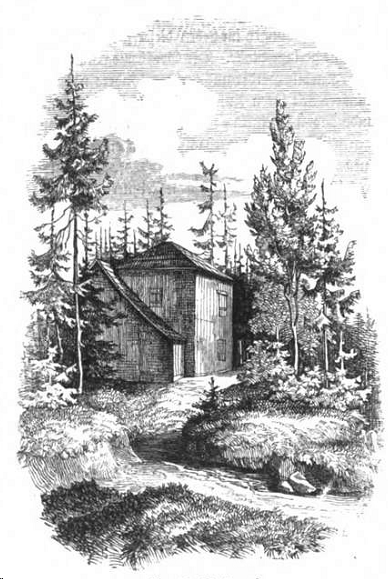
Goethehäuschen in 1843

Until the 18th century the mountain, together with the parts of Manebach on the right bank of Ilm river, was called Cammerberg. Its current name which translates roughly into "crowing rooster" is probably derived from a vernacular name for the wood grouse which was native to the region, making the area a popular hunting ground of the Weimar court. According to another theory the name is a pun on the former lords of the area, the counts of Henneberg, whose coat of arms shows a chicken.

The mountain became well known through Johann Wolfgang Goethe who visited the area first in 1776 when he – as minister of the mines – inspected the coal mines of Manebach on the western slope. On 7 May 1776 he visited Großer Hermannstein for the first time and returned several times until his last visit there on 29 August 1813. This location may have inspired him to a passage in Faust, Part One, lines 3228 to 3234. In 1776 he also sketched a view from Kickelhahn across the "brumous valleys" of the Thuringian Forest for Charlotte von Stein.

Goethe visited Ilmenau 28 times, and between 1780 and 1831 he walked several times to Kickelhahn, often accompanying Duke Karl August. In a hunters' cabin, later named Goethehäuschen ("Goethe's cabin"), he wrote his poem Wanderer's Nightsong on the wall of the building in the night from 6 to 7 September 1783. He last visited the mountain and the cabin in 1831 together with geologist Johann Christian Mahr and wrote in a letter to the composer Carl Friedrich Zelter about it.

== Buildings ==
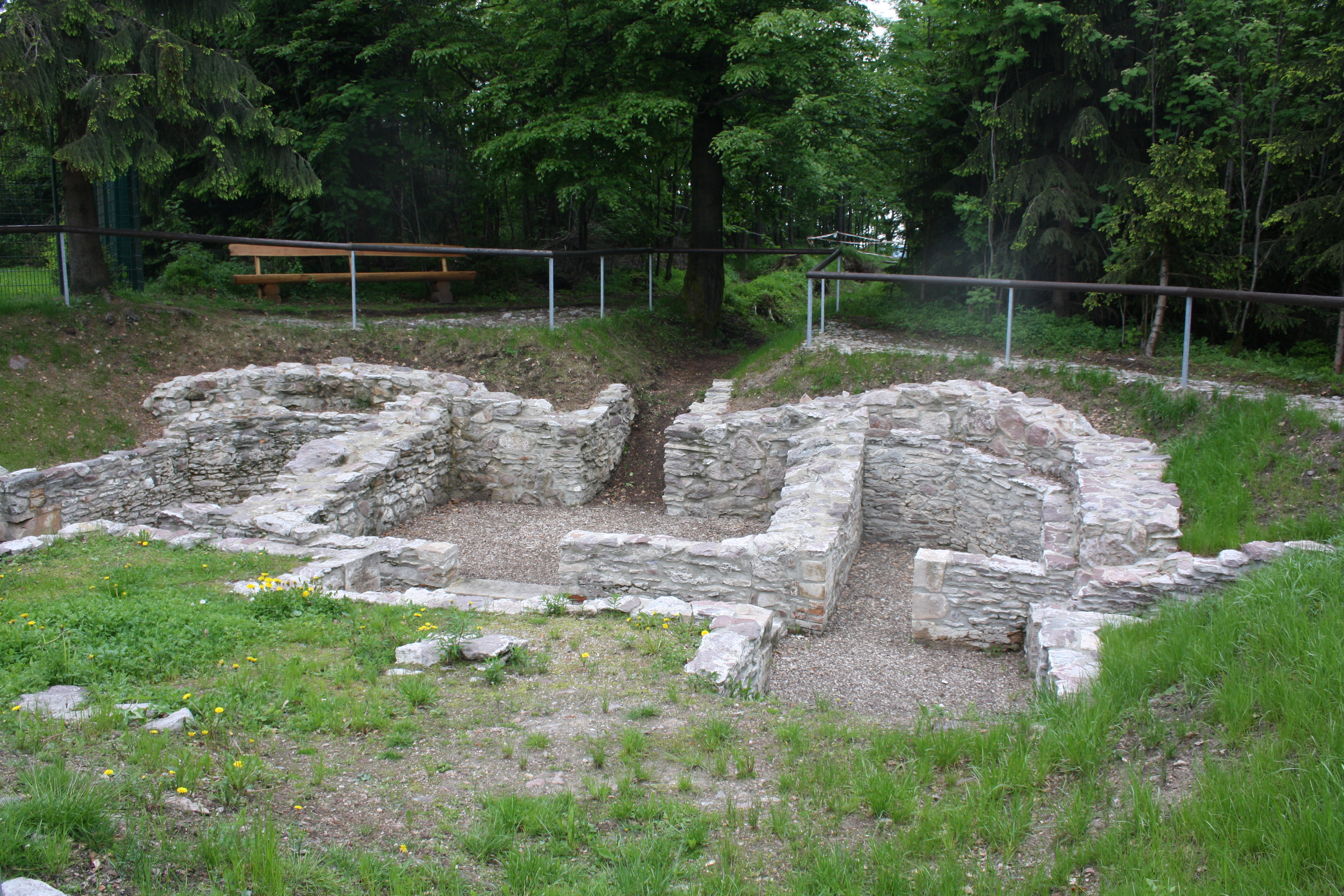
Ruins of former hunting lodge

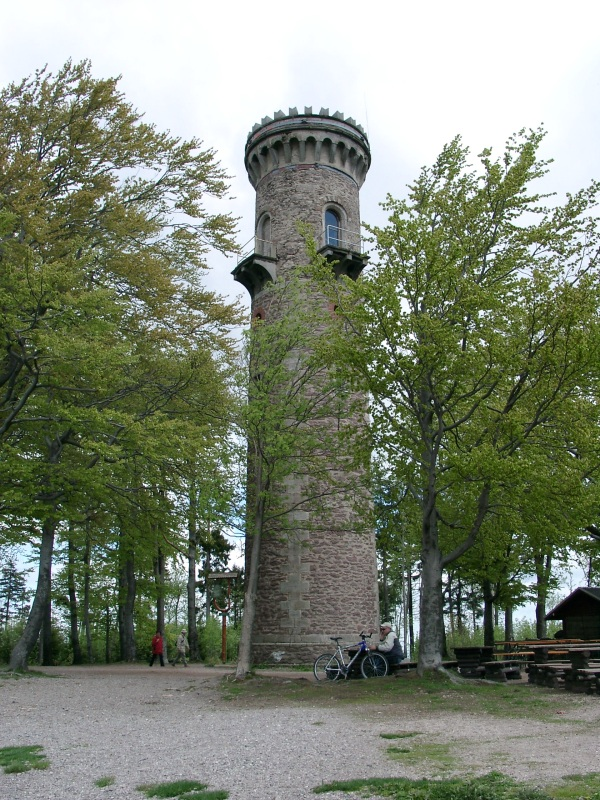
Observation tower on Kickelhahn

When Ilmenau developed into a health resort in the 1830s, an observation tower was seen as worthwhile, but the town was not able to finance such a project at the time. In 1852 an observation tower was built on nearby Schneekopf in Saxe-Gotha. When Grand Duke Carl Friedrich and Grand Duchess Maria Pavlovna of Saxe-Weimar-Eisenach visited Ilmenau in the autumn of that year, they also desired a similar tower to be erected on Kickelhahn. Maria Pavlovna donated 1000 Thaler towards the construction which was to be supervised by the town council. The foundation stone was laid on 8 May 1854, stone for the rubble masonry was quarried nearby, while the sandstone for the ornaments originated in Martinroda. The tower was finished at a total cost of 2200 Thaler and opened on 12 May 1855. It was named Marienturm after the benefactress. 107 steps lead to the observation platform 21 m above ground. After the Schneekopf tower was demolished following World War II, the Kickelhahn tower is the oldest remaining observation tower in the Thuringian Forest. A restaurant is situated nearby.

South of the tower and the restaurant stand a transmitter tower and a building of Deutsche Telekom. The transmitter site was established in the early 1960s as part of the internal radio network of the SED. In 1984 the site passed to Deutsche Post and was used for broadcast transmissions. It passed to Deutsche Telekom in 1990 and serves now for mobile telephony. The broadcast transmitter was shut down on 28 January 2015.

The historic cabin Goethehäuschen is located north of the summit. It was originally built under Duke Carl August in 1783 as an accommodation for hunting parties. The cabin burned down on 12 August 1870 due to carelessness of some berry pickers who had spent the night there. It was rebuilt in 1874. The poem can now be read in 15 languages on the inner walls of the building.

Ruins of a small hunting lodge, likely built under Duke Ernst August I have been excavated since 2004. From its basement, sheltered trenches led to hides where the hunters could lay in wait for the game.

Berghotel Gabelbach is located south of the summit at an altitude of about 700 m. It was built as a health resort and opened in 1912. The Dutch prime minister Hendrikus Colijn was interned there from 1942 until his death in 1944. He is commemorated by a memorial stone. After World War II it was used as a recreation home by the Central Committee of the SED and for the accommodation of foreign dignitaries and was not accessible to the general public until 1990 when it was bought by an investor from Nuremberg. After changing hands in 1998 and 2011, it was reconstructed in 2013/2014.

== Tourism ==
Kickelhahn can be reached by several hiking paths, among them the Goethewanderweg Ilmenau–Stützerbach, marked by a handwritten "G", and the long distance hiking path, marked by a blue bar in a white square. The restaurant opens daily, the observation tower is accessible free of charge. The mountain hotel Gabelbach south of the summit offers 90 rooms.

The area is also used for sports, with runners and mountain bikers dominating in the summer, and cross-country skiing in the winter. Sledding is popular on the descent towards Ilmenau, the run with an altitude difference of more than 350 m (1,150 ft) takes about 15 minutes. Regular competitions are the Kickelhahn mountain race for runners, a mountain time trial for cyclists, and the beer crate race (Bierathlon) of TU Ilmenau.
