= Plaue =

- Town
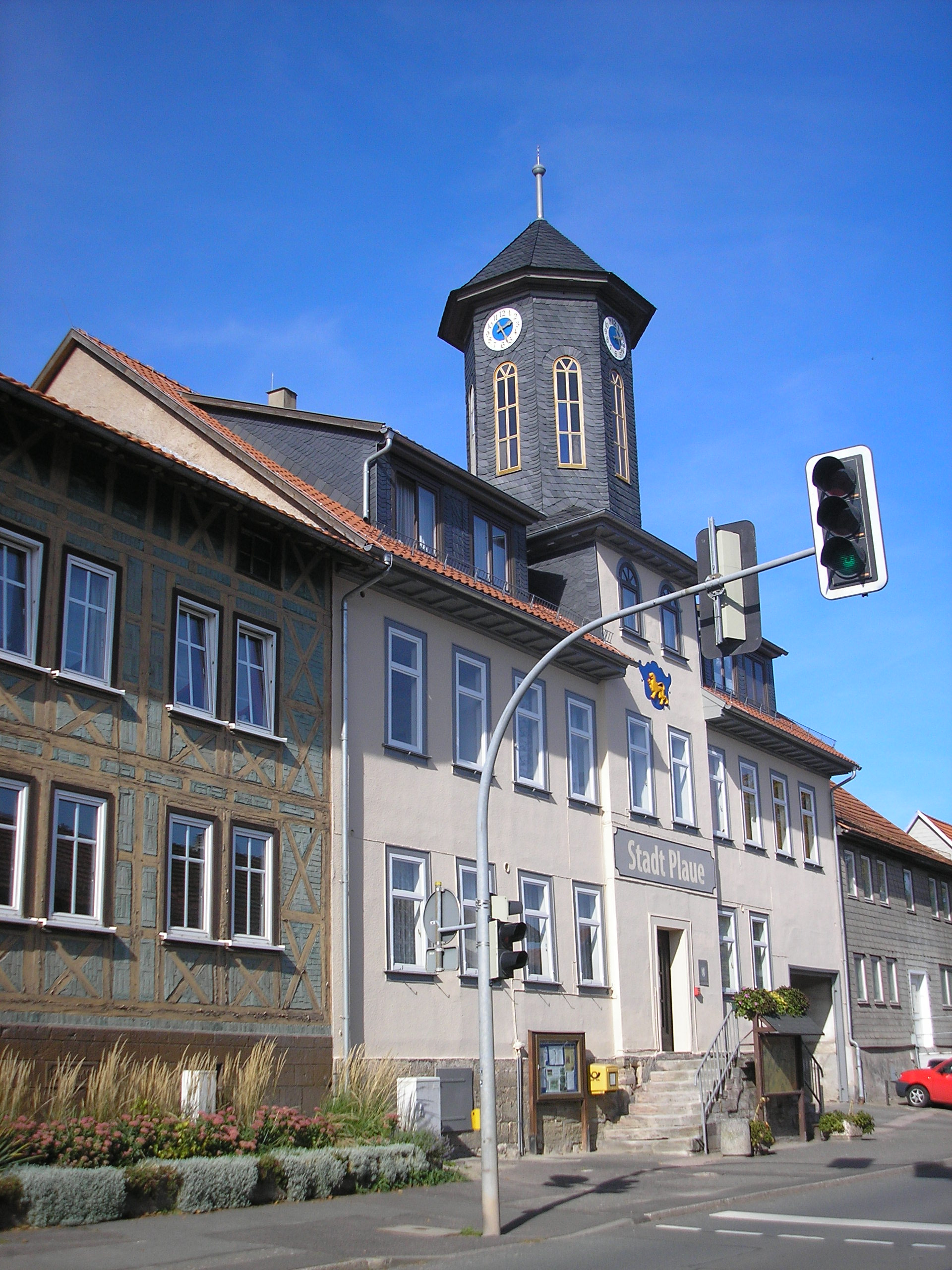

- Coat of arms

- Location of Plaue within Ilm-Kreis district
- Interactive map of Plaue
- Location within Germany Location within Thuringia
- Coordinates: 50°46′46″N 10°53′56″E
- Country: Germany
- State: Thuringia
- District: Ilm-Kreis
- Municipal assoc.: Geratal/Plaue
- Subdivisions: 3

Government
  - Mayor (2021–27): Christian Janik

Area
  - Total: 22.69 km^{2} (8.76 sq mi)
- Elevation: 330 m (1,080 ft)

Population (2025-12-31)
  - Total: 1,972
  - Density: 86.91/km^{2} (225.1/sq mi)
- Time zone: UTC+01:00 (CET)
  - Summer (DST): UTC+02:00 (CEST)
- Postal codes: 99338
- Dialling codes: 036207
- Vehicle registration: IK
- Website: www.plaue-thueringen.de

Plaue (German pronunciation: [ˈplaʊə]) is a town in the Ilm-Kreis district, in Thuringia, Germany. It is situated on the river Gera, 11 km north of Ilmenau, and 8 km southwest of Arnstadt. The former municipality Neusiß was merged into Plaue in January 2019. Plaue station lies on the Neudietendorf–Ritschenhausen railway.
