= Ebenhausen (Unterfr) station =

Railway station in Germany

Ebenhausen (Unterfr)
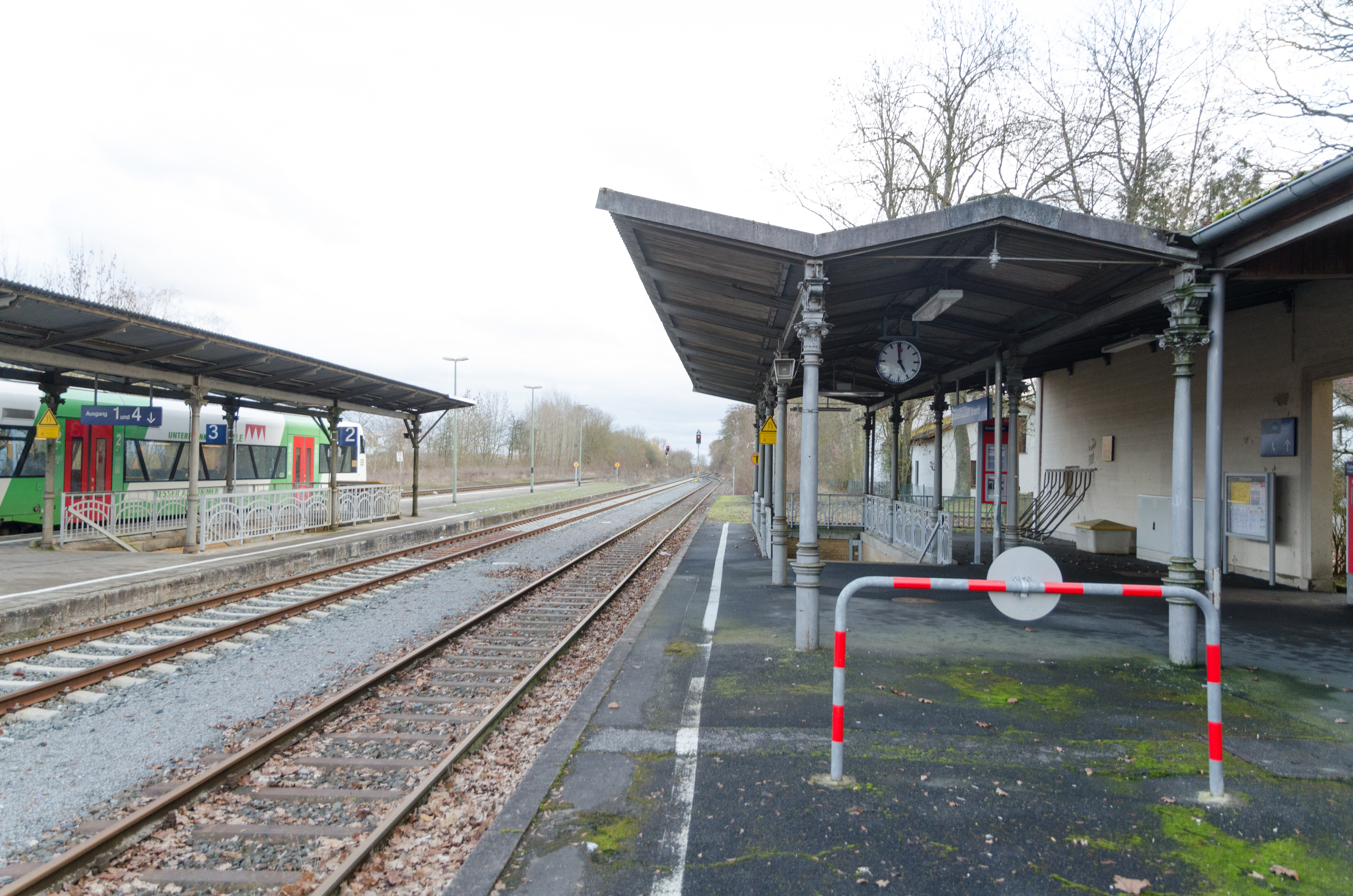
- 2014

General information
- Location: Bahnhofstraße 36; 97714 Ebenhausen; Bavaria; Germany
- Coordinates: 50.1311°N 10.1381°E
- Elevation: 295 m (968 ft)
- System: Bf
- Owner: DB Netz
- Operator: DB Station&Service
- Lines: Schweinfurt–Meiningen railway (KBS 815); Gemünden–Ebenhausen Railway (KBS 803)
- Platforms: 1 island platform 2 side platforms
- Tracks: 4
- Train operators: DB Regio Südost; Erfurter Bahn

Construction
- Parking: yes
- Cycle facilities: yes
- Accessible: no

Other information
- Station code: 1428
- DS100 code: NEBH
- IBNR: 8001620
- Category: 5
- Fare zone: NVM: B/763
- Website: www.bahnhof.de

History
- Opened: 1871; 155 years ago

Services
Preceding station	DB Regio Südost	Following station
Münnerstadt towards Erfurt Hbf	RE 7	Schweinfurt Hbf towards Würzburg Hbf
Oerlenbach towards Bad Kissingen	RE 57	Schweinfurt Hbf towards Würzburg Hbf
Preceding station		Following station
Poppenhausen towards Schweinfurt Stadt	RB 40	Rottershausen towards Meiningen
Oerlenbach towards Gemünden (Main)	RB 50	Poppenhausen towards Schweinfurt Stadt
Location
- Location within Bavaria Location within Germany Location within Europe

Ebenhausen (Unterfr) station is a railway station in Ebenhausen, Bavaria, Germany.
