= Oerlenbach station =

Railway halt in the district of Bad Kissingen, Lower Franconia, Germany

Oerlenbach

General information
- Location: Heglerstraße 11; 97714 Oerlenbach; Bavaria; Germany
- Coordinates: 50.1433°N 10.1309°E
- System: Hp
- Owner: DB Netz
- Operator: DB Station&Service
- Lines: Gemünden–Ebenhausen Railway (KBS 803)
- Platforms: 1 side platform
- Tracks: 1
- Train operators: DB Regio Südost; Erfurter Bahn

Construction
- Parking: no
- Cycle facilities: no
- Accessible: yes

Other information
- Station code: 4734
- DS100 code: NOER
- IBNR: 8004629
- Category: 6
- Fare zone: NVM: B/766
- Website: www.bahnhof.de

Services
Preceding station	DB Regio Südost	Following station
Bad Kissingen Terminus	RE 57	Ebenhausen (Unterfr) towards Würzburg Hbf
Preceding station		Following station
Bad Kissingen towards Gemünden (Main)	RB 50	Ebenhausen (Unterfr) towards Schweinfurt Stadt
Location
- Location within Bavaria Location within Germany Location within Europe

Oerlenbach station is a railway station in Oerlenbach, Bavaria, Germany.
