= Unterfrankenshuttle =

Logo of the Unterfranken Shuttle

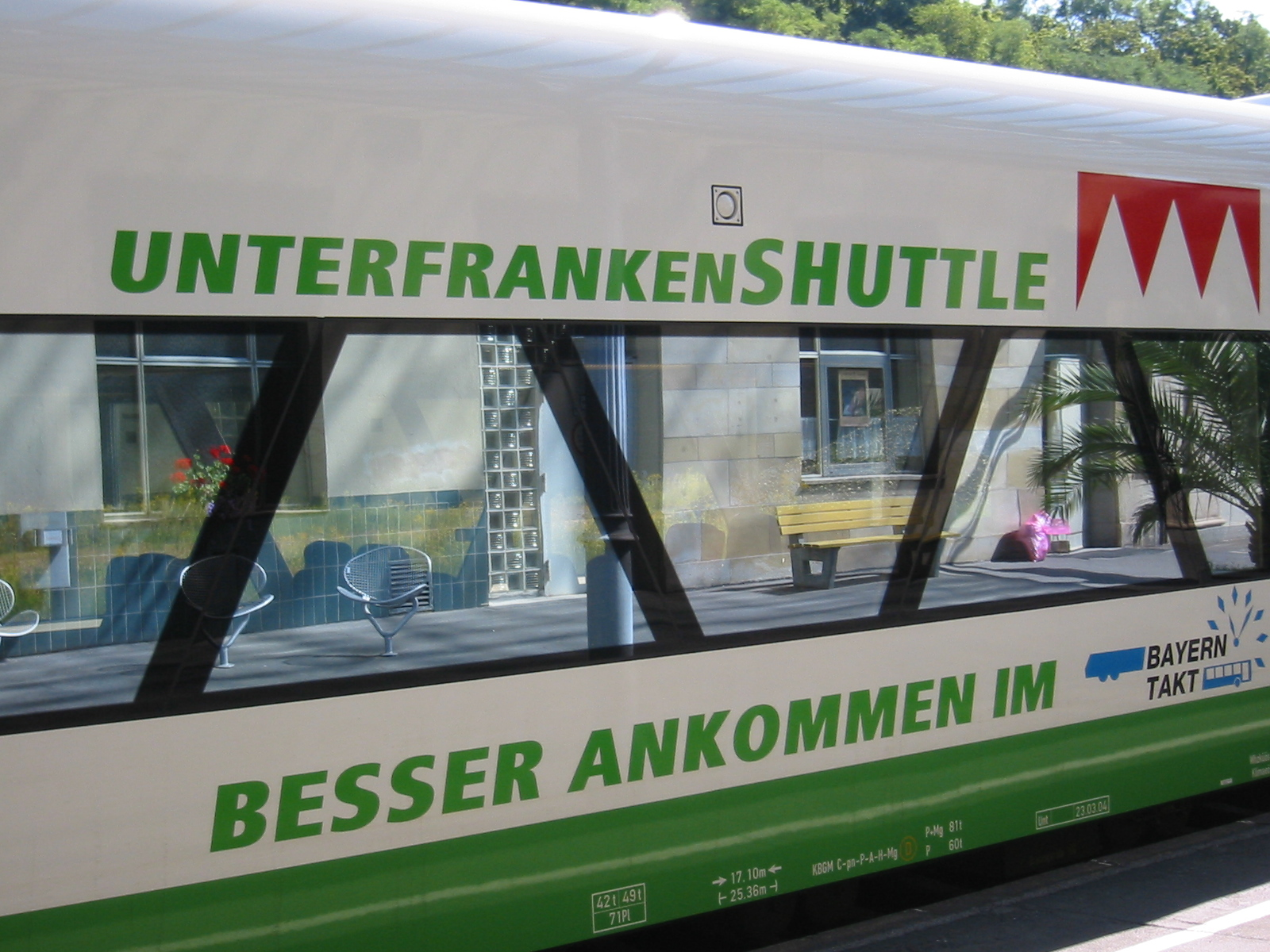
An Unterfranken Shuttle of the Erfurter Bahn in Bad Kissingen

Unterfranken Shuttle ("Lower Franconia Shuttle") is the marketing name under which the Erfurter Bahn (EB) regional railway operates the lines from Schweinfurt to Meiningen and Schweinfurt to Gemünden (Main) in Lower Franconia and South Thuringia in Germany. Operations began in December 2004.

== Formation ==
In summer 2002, the Bayerische Eisenbahngesellschaft railway company intended to re-tender for the regional railway services in northern Lower Franconia with a connection to the neighbouring town of Meiningen in southern Thuringia. Instead of an open competition, it carried out price enquiries with five different railway companies. Erfurter Bahn's bid proved to be the most economical, ahead of those of DB Regio and the other three bidders who had already been eliminated. The contract covered the regional railway services on the following routes:

- KBS 803 (Fränkische Saaletalbahn) Schweinfurt–Bad Kissingen–Hammelburg–Gemünden (Main)
- KBS 815 (Main-Rhön-Bahn) Schweinfurt–Bad Neustadt (Saale)–Mellrichstadt–Meiningen, a section of the Main Franconian-Thuringian link from Erfurt to Würzburg

Compared to the previous transport services provided by DB Regio, the operating volume was increased by around 60,000 train kilometres to 1.2 million train kilometres per year, which made it possible to extend the trains beyond the decentralised Schweinfurt Hauptbahnhof to the city railway station. The transport contract became effective with the start of operations for the timetable change on 12 December 2004 and had a term of ten years. After winning the tender again in 2013, the Lower Franconian shuttle will run until at least 2026 under the direction of Erfurt Railway.
