= Schweinfurt–Meiningen railway =

Railway line in Germany

Schweinfurt—Meiningen railway
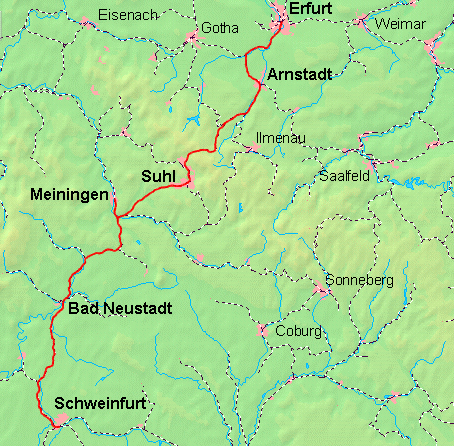

Overview
- Native name: Bahnstrecke Schweinfurt-Meiningen
- Owner: Deutsche Bahn
- Locale: Bavaria, Thuringia in Germany
- Termini: Schweinfurt Hbf; Meiningen
- Stations: 14

Service
- Operator(s): DB Bahn, Erfurter Bahn

History
- Commenced: 9 October 1871 (Schweinfurt Hbf—Bad Kissingen)
- Completed: 15 December 1874

Technical
- Line length: 77.9 km (48.4 mi)
- Number of tracks: Single track
- Track gauge: 1,435 mm (4 ft 8 1/2 in) standard gauge
- Minimum radius: 500 m
- Maximum incline: 1.1 %

The Schweinfurt–Meiningen railway, route number 5240, is a single-tracked main line in the states of Bavaria and Saxony in southern Germany. It is also called the Main-Rhön-Bahn ("Main-Rhön railway") and is listed in the Deutsche Bahn timetable as route (Kursbuchstrecke) 815. The railway has been part of the Erfurt–Schweinfurt route since 1993. Passenger services on the line are provided by DB Regio and the Erfurter Bahn (EB).

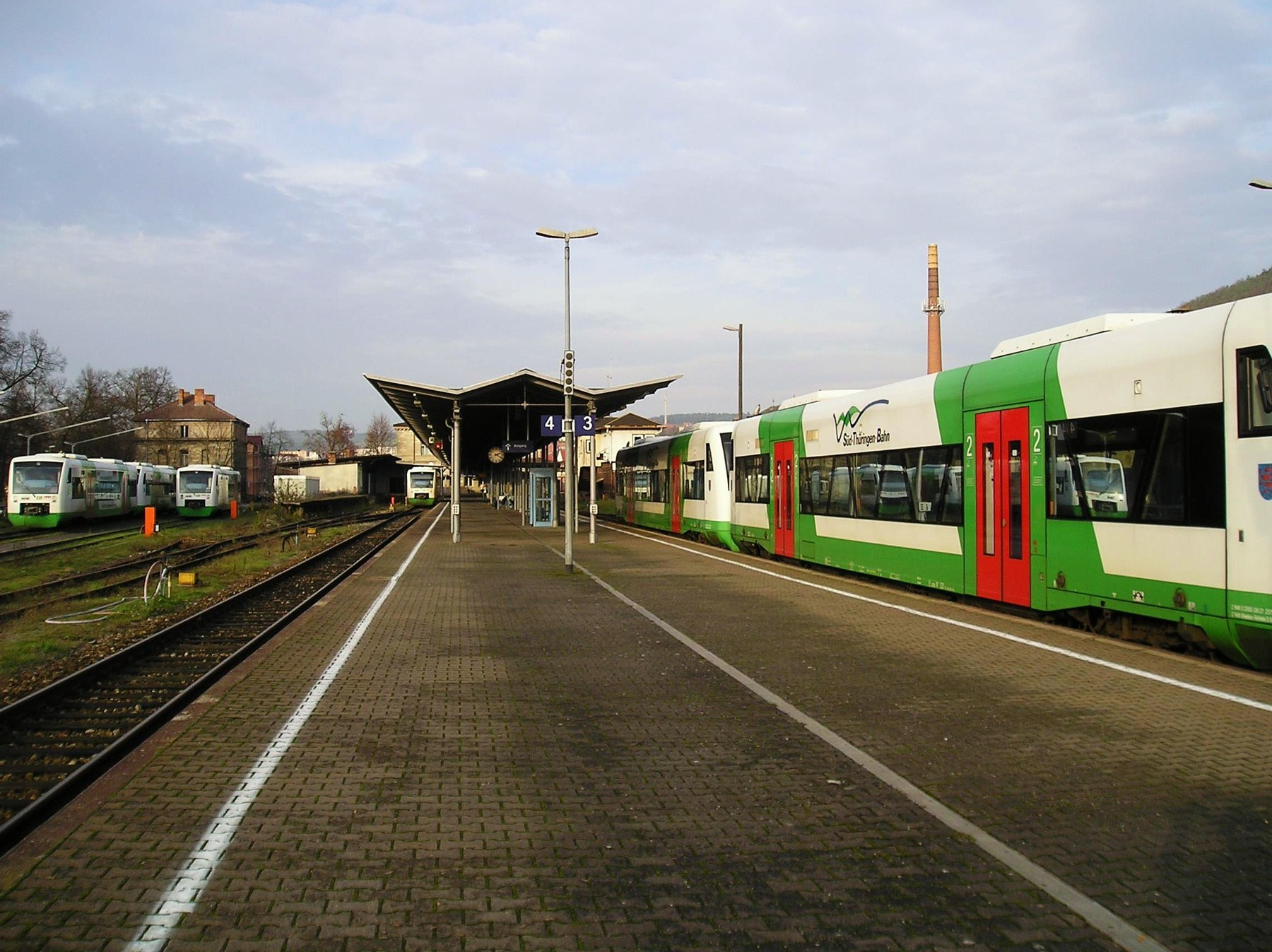
The Bavarian station in Meiningen

== History ==
After the completion of the first major railway lines in the middle of the 19th century, the Bavarian government became very interested in opening up other parts of Bavaria and in establishing shorter links within the existing railway network. As a result, aspirations arose for a connection between the Bamberg-Würzburg railway at Schweinfurt and the Werrabahn at Meiningen, not least in order to improve the accessibility of the Saxon-Meiningen provincial capital.

The governments of Bavaria and Saxe-Meiningen signed a state treaty on 21 March 1868 for the establishment of a railway line from Schweinfurt via Neustadt an der Saale to Meiningen. The Bavarian state railway took on the construction and management of the entire route; each government bore the cost of the section of the line on its own territory.

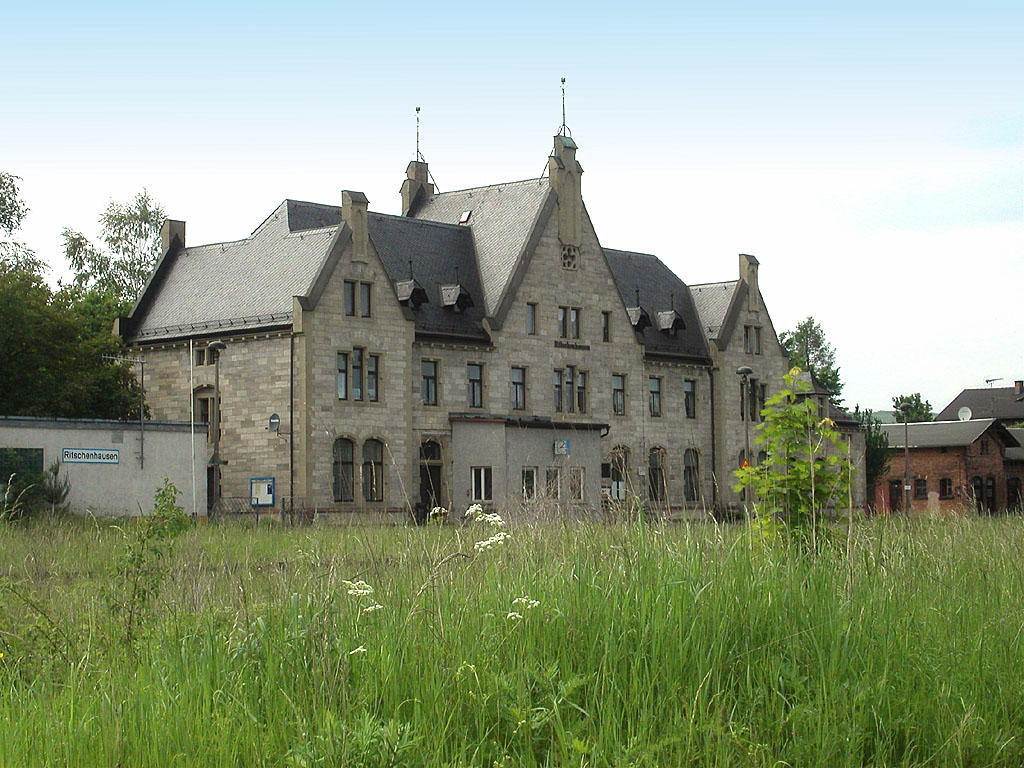
Ritschenhausen station

In 1871, after railway operations had begun on the line from Schweinfurt to Bad Kissingen via Ebenhausen, work started on the section from Ebenhausen to Meiningen on 14 June 1872. In Meiningen the Bavarian station (Bayerische Bahnhof) was built on the southern side of the existing Werrabahn station. Its construction entailed major topographical alterations and changes to the way traffic operations were conducted in the area of the town. The 64 kilometre long route was opened on 15 December 1874 by the Royal Bavarian State Railways, the operator of the line. Following the completion of the railway from Ritschenhausen to Neudietendorf in 1884, express trains ran over the line from Berlin via Meiningen to Stuttgart. This required locomotives to be exchanged as the train crossed over from the jurisdiction of the Prussian to the Bavarian state railways at either Meiningen or Ritschenhausen.

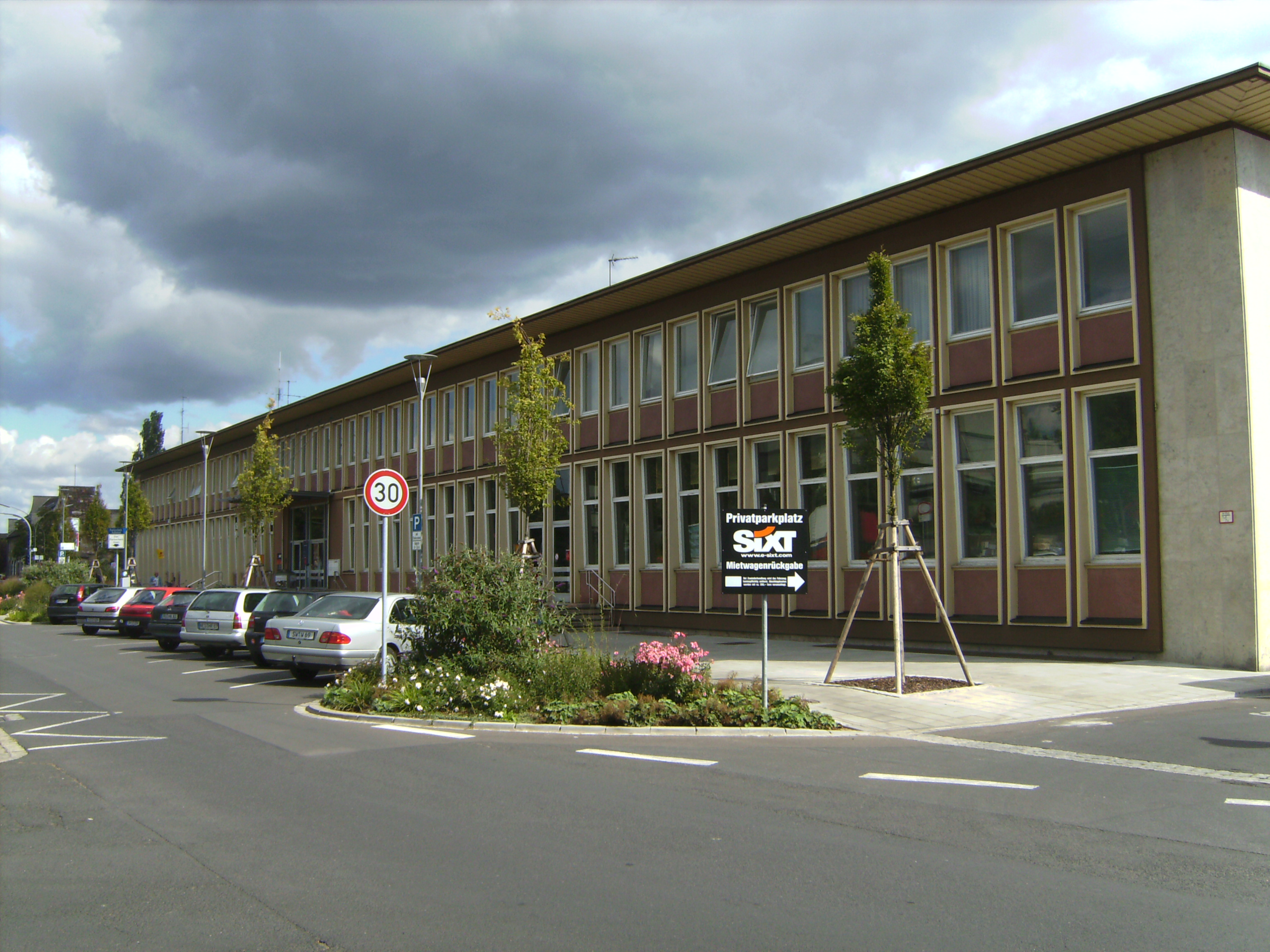
Schweinfurt Hauptbahnhof

After the takeover of the state railways (Länderbahnen) by the Deutsche Reichsbahn the latter ran the route and kept the express services running. After the Second World War the line was cut between Rentwertshausen and Mühlfeld due to the partition of Germany. From then on the Deutsche Reichsbahn (DR) in East Germany only operated the Meiningen–Rentwertshausen–Römhild section. Railway services on branch from Rentwertshausen to Römhild, opened in 1893, were withdrawn in 1972 again. The Deutsche Bundesbahn (DB) initially continued to work the line to Mühlfeld, but from 1971 only as far as Mellrichstadt. Express trains from Munich called here until the early 1980s.

After the reunification of Germany in 1990 the DB and DR soon closed the gaps in the line again and it was ceremonially reopened in 1991. For a short while long-distance traffic came to life again in the shape of the Interregio train, the Rennsteig, but in 2001 it was replaced by a Regionalexpress.

== Operation ==
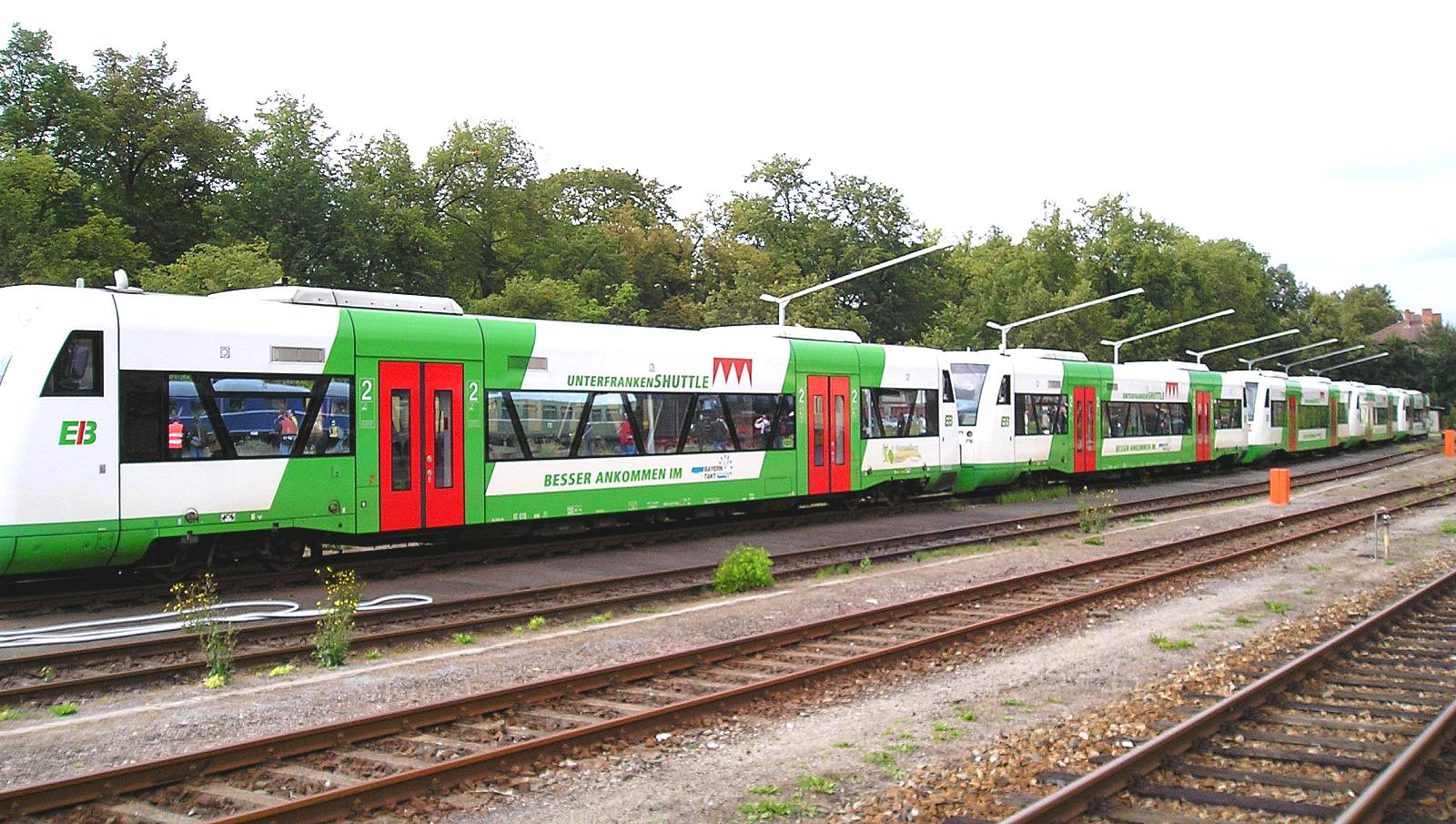
The Lower Franconia Shuttle at Meiningen station

Since 2004 rail services on the line between Schweinfurt and Meiningen have been operated by the Erfurter Bahn (EB) whose Lower Franconia Shuttle (Unterfranken-Shuttle), line EB 4, runs every two hours between Schweinfurt and Mellrichstadt from Monday to Friday and, on Saturday am and Sunday pm, almost hourly. In addition DB Regionalexpress trains run every two hours from Erfurt to Schweinfurt (RE 7) (on this section from Ritschenhausen). Since 2008 the DB has used tilting trains which attain speeds of up to 160 km/h. The Erfurter Bahn also operates the EB 5 Regionalbahn route (the Franconian Saale Valley railway or Fränkische Saaletalbahn) using the Unterfranken-Shuttle on the Schweinfurth–Eberhausen line and running it through to Bad Kissingen and Gemünden am Main. The „Unterfranken-Shuttle“ also calls at Schweinfurt-Mitte and Schweinfurt-Stadt via Schweinfurt Hauptbahnhof. The DB uses Class 612 DMUs exclusively whilst the Erfurter Bahn operates Stadler Regio-Shuttle RS1 multiples.

== Passenger services ==
The following services work the Schweinfurt–Meiningen railway:

- RE (Würzburg) – Schweinfurt-Hbf – Mellrichstadt – (Erfurt) (DB RE 7 / Mainfranken-Thüringen-Express).
- RE (Würzburg) – Schweinfurt-Hbf – Ebenhausen – (Bad Kissingen) (DB)
- RB Meiningen – Schweinfurt-Hbf – (Schweinfurt-Stadt) (Line EB 4 / Unterfranken-Shuttle).
- RB Meiningen – Ebenhausen – (Bad Kissingen) (Linie EB 4 / Unterfranken-Shuttle).
- RB (Schweinfurt-Stadt) – Schweinfurt-Hbf – Mellrichstadt (Line EB 4 / Unterfranken-Shuttle).
- RB (Schweinfurt-Stadt) – Schweinfurt-Hbf – Bad Kissingen – Gemünden (Line EB 5 / Unterfranken-Shuttle).

== Sources ==
- Tino Avemark: Der Meininger Bahnhof im Wandel of the Zeit, Bielsteinverlag Meiningen 2008, ISBN 978-3-9809504-3-5
