= Bad Neustadt (Saale) station =

Railway station in Germany

Bad Neustadt (Saale)

General information
- Location: Siemensstraße 12; 97616 Bad Neustadt (Saale); Bavaria; Germany
- Coordinates: 50.32811°N 10.225824°E
- Elevation: 233 m (764 ft)
- System: Bf
- Owner: DB Netz
- Operator: DB Station&Service
- Lines: Schweinfurt–Meiningen railway (KBS 815); Bad Neustadt–Bischofsheim railway (KBS 814); Bad Neustadt–Bad Königshofen railway (KBS 815)
- Platforms: 1 island platform 2 side platforms
- Tracks: 4
- Train operators: DB Regio Südost; Erfurter Bahn

Construction
- Parking: yes
- Cycle facilities: yes
- Accessible: no

Other information
- Station code: 313
- DS100 code: NBNE
- IBNR: 8000730
- Category: 5
- Fare zone: NVM: B/832
- Website: www.bahnhof.de

Services
Preceding station	DB Regio Südost	Following station
Mellrichstadt Bahnhof towards Erfurt Hbf	RE 7	Münnerstadt towards Würzburg Hbf
Preceding station		Following station
Burglauer towards Schweinfurt Stadt	RB 40	Mellrichstadt Bf towards Meiningen
Location
- Location within Bavaria Location within Germany Location within Europe

Bad Neustadt (Saale) station is a railway station in Bad Neustadt (Saale), Bavaria, Germany.
