= Schweinfurt Central Station =

Schweinfurt Central Station may refer to:

- Schweinfurt Hauptbahnhof, Schweinfurt's main railway station
- Schweinfurt Mitte station, a central railway station in Schweinfurt
