= Rentwertshausen–Römhild railway =

Railway line in Germany

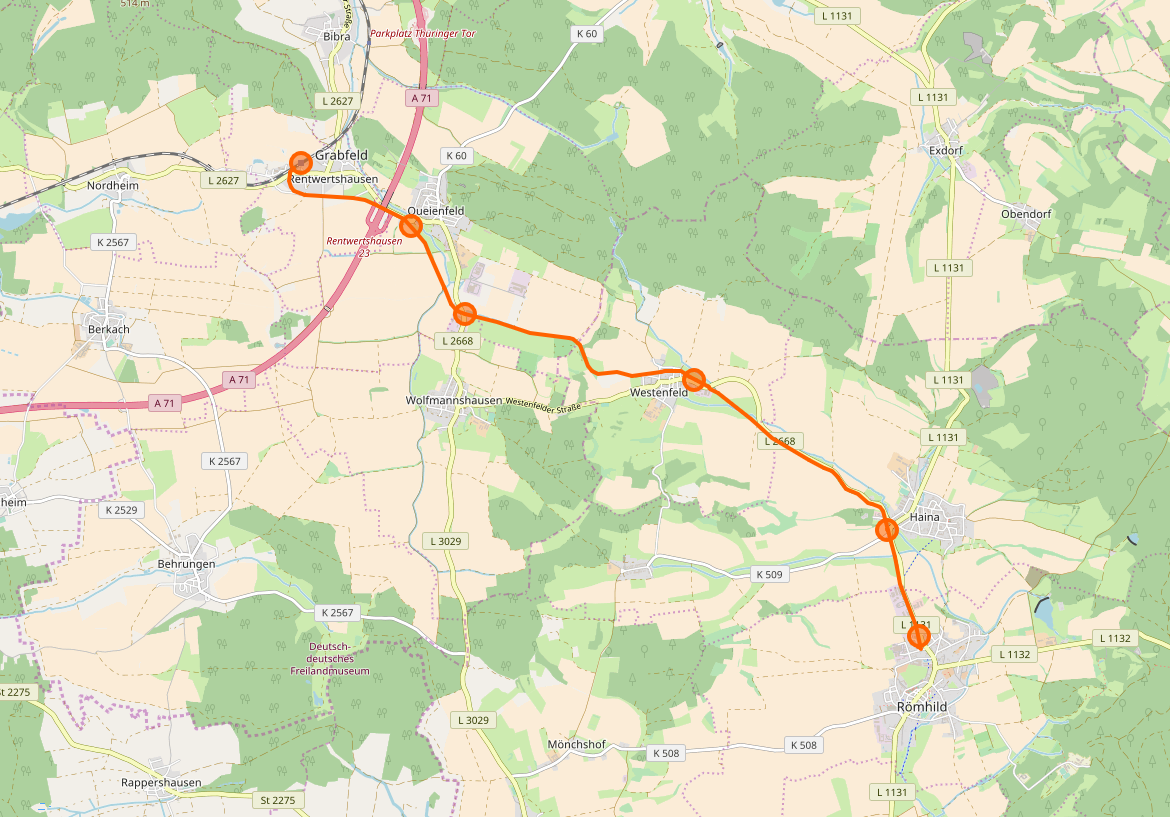
- The former railway line shown on a map from 2017.

Technical
- Line length: 10.7 km (6.6 mi)

The Rentwertshausen–Römhild railway was a single-tracked branch line in the state of Thuringia in central Germany. It was just under 11 kilometres long and ran from Rentwertshausen to Römhild in the south Thuringian region of Grabfeld. Due to its proximity to the Gleichberge mountains, the line was also known as the Gleichbergbahn (Gleichberg railway). It was dismantled in 1973.

== History ==
On 15 December 1874 the Schweinfurt–Meiningen railway was opened to rail services by the Royal Bavarian State Railways. It was followed on 25 November 1893 by the 10.7 kilometre long Sekundärbahn branch from Rentwertshausen to Römhild.

The legal basis for the line was a state treaty between the Kingdom of Bavaria and the Duchy of Saxe-Meiningen, which was concluded on 16 June 1884. The cost of the railway was found by Saxe-Meiningen and the district of Römhild, the construction and operation of the branch was undertaken by the Bavarian state railway. At the beginning of March 1895 Saxe-Meiningen sold the Gleichbergbahn to Bavaria.

From 1901, with the establishment of the town basalt works at Römhild the line became the town's life line. Over 140,000 wagons, each carrying 10 tonnes of ballast or gneiss rock, an average of about 18 wagons per day, were transported to Rentwertshausen in the next 26 years.

After the Second World War the line, which had been managed since 1931 by the Nuremberg railway division, became part of the Erfurt railway division due to the drawing up of the Inner German Border. Because the main line between Mühlfeld and Rentwertshausen was blocked, passenger trains now ran directly from Römhild to Meiningen. Passenger services were withdrawn on 29 September 1968, goods traffic followed in early January 1970. The line was dismantled between 1972 and 1973.

== Operations ==
DRG Class 93 (ex Prussian T 14) and DRG Class 86 locomotives were used, amongst others. In 1944 four pairs of passenger trains ran daily on this line which was timetable route number (KBS) 417 k. The journey time was about half an hour.

== See also ==
- Royal Bavarian State Railways
- Bavarian branch lines
- List of closed railway lines in Bavaria
