= Bad Kissingen station =

Railway station in Bad Kissingen, Germany

Bad Kissingen
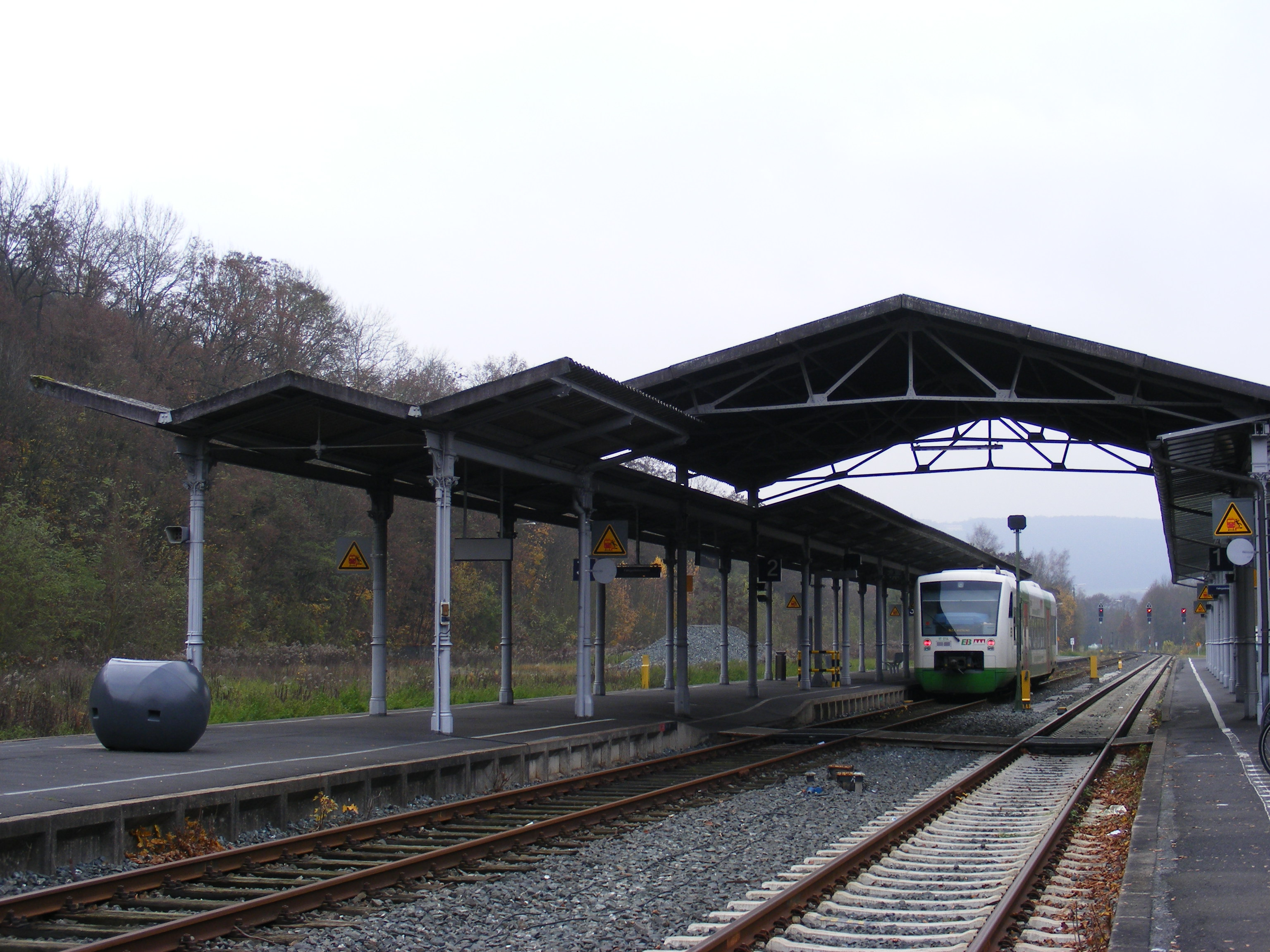

General information
- Location: Bahnhofstraße 5; 97688 Bad Kissingen; Bavaria; Germany
- Coordinates: 50°11′30″N 10°04′47″E
- Owner: DB Netz
- Operator: DB Station&Service
- Line: Franconian Saale Valley Railway
- Platforms: 1 island platform 1 side platform
- Tracks: 3
- Train operators: DB Regio Südost; Erfurter Bahn

Other information
- Station code: 288
- DS100 code: NBKI
- IBNR: 8000714
- Category: 5
- Fare zone: NVM: B/762
- Website: www.bahnhof.de

History
- Opened: 1874; 152 years ago

Services
Preceding station	DB Regio Südost	Following station
Terminus	RE 57	Oerlenbach towards Würzburg Hbf
Preceding station		Following station
Euerdorf towards Gemünden (Main)	RB 50	Oerlenbach towards Schweinfurt Stadt
Location
- Location within Bavaria Location within Germany Location within Europe

Bad Kissingen station is a railway station in the spa town of Bad Kissingen, located in the Bad Kissingen district in Lower Franconia, Bavaria, Germany.
