= Mellrichstadt Bahnhof =

Railway station in northern Bavaria, Germany

Mellrichstadt
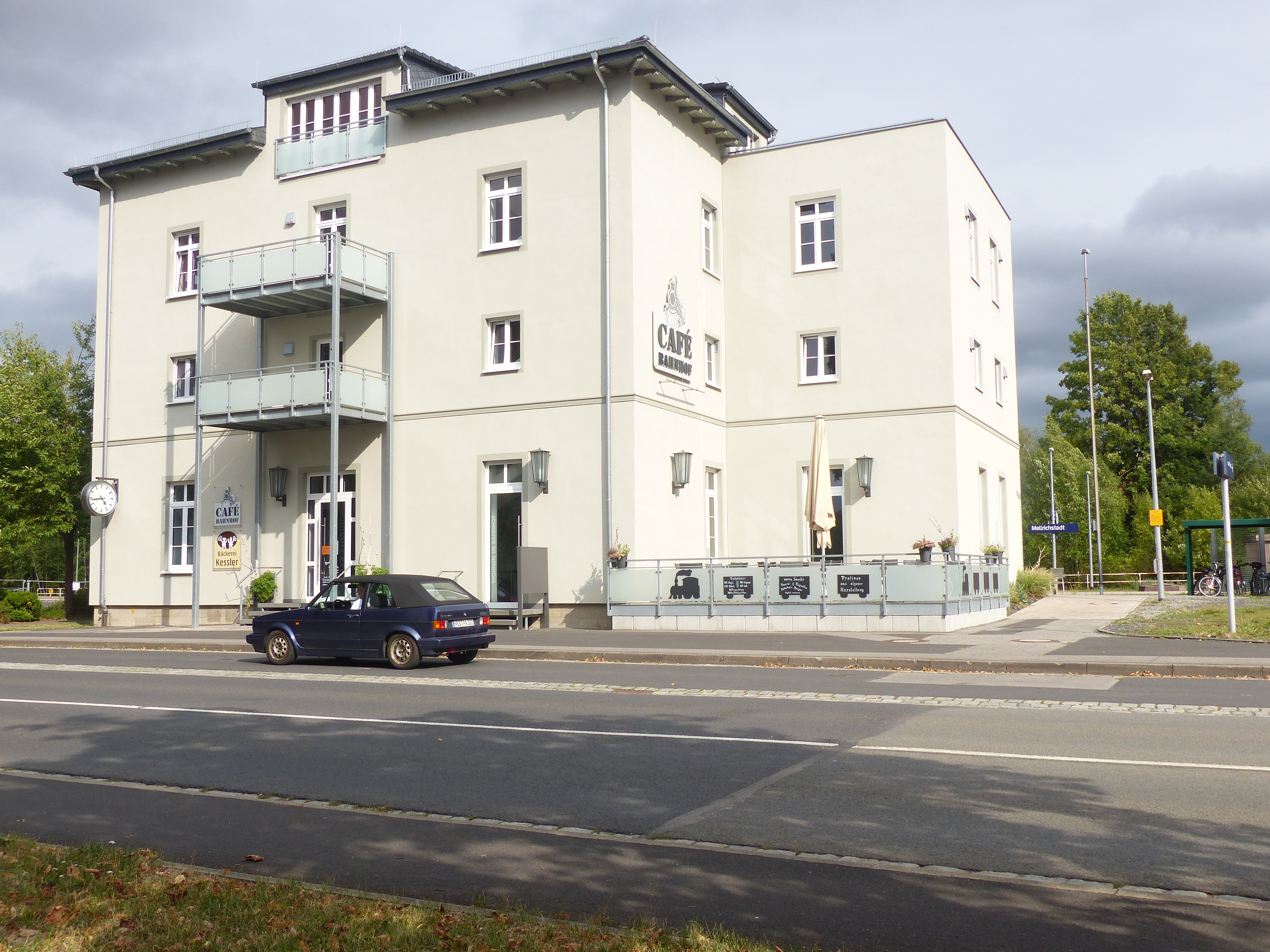
- Mellrichstadt station

General information
- Location: Mellrichstadt, Bavaria; Germany
- Coordinates: 50°25′29″N 10°18′24″E
- Lines: Schweinfurt–Meiningen (52.1 km); Mellrichstadt–Fladungen (0.0 km)
- Platforms: 2

Other information
- Station code: 4049
- DS100 code: NME
- Category: 6
- Fare zone: NVM: B/842
- Website: www.bahnhof.de; stationsdatenbank.de

History
- Opened: 15 December 1874

Passengers
- < 500 (2006)

Services
Preceding station	DB Regio Südost	Following station
Grimmenthal towards Erfurt Hbf	RE 7	Bad Neustadt (Saale) towards Würzburg Hbf
Preceding station		Following station
Bad Neustadt (Saale) towards Schweinfurt Stadt	RB 40	Rentwertshausen towards Meiningen
Location
- Location within Bavaria Location within Germany Location within Europe

Mellrichstadt Bahnhof (lit. 'Mellrichstadt station') is a railway station operated by the Deutsche Bahn in the Lower Franconian town of Mellrichstadt in Germany.

== General ==
The station is located on the Schweinfurt–Meiningen railway in southern Germany and, since the closure of Mühlfeld station, is the last stop on the Bavarian side of the border with Thuringia. From 1898, the station was the departure point for the Mellrichstadt–Fladungen railway which ran scheduled services until 1987. Since then the line has become a museum railway worked by the ‘’Rhön-Zügle’’ (“Little Rhön Train”).

== History ==
Rail services began on the Meiningen–Schweinfurt route in 1874 and on the branch line to Fladungen in 1898. As a consequence of the division of Germany the Erfurt to Schweinfurt line was cut in 1945. From then on Mellrichstadt became the terminus for trains from Würzburg and Schweinfurt. Until the 1980s there were direct connexions from Munich Hauptbahnhof to Mellrichstadt; since then however the station has only been served by direct trains from Würzburg and Schweinfurt. Railway operations ceased on the Mellrichstadt–Fladungen branch in 1987. After the reunification of Germany the gap between Bavaria and Thuringia was closed and, after 46 years, Mellrichstadt is once again a through station. Since 1996 the Fladungen branch has been reactivated as a museum railway, services to all the way through to Mellrichstadt beginning again in 2000.

== Services ==
In 2007, Mellrichstadt was served every two hours by the Mainfranken-Thüringen Express from Würzburg to Erfurt and by the Unterfranken Shuttle from Schweinfurt to Meiningen on the Werra Railway. That results in what is virtually an hourly service between 5 a.m. and 11 p.m. Mellrichstadt station is also the departure point for numerous bus lines belonging to Omnibusverkehr Franken (OVF) which link up a large part of the Bavarian Rhön, a region of low mountains which extends across the border into Hesse and Thuringia.

Train class	Route	Frequency
RE 7	Erfurt – Arnstadt – Grimmenthal – Mellrichstadt – Ebenhausen – Schweinfurt – Würzburg	Every 2 hours
RB 40	(Meiningen – Ritschenhausen –) Mellrichstadt – Ebenhausen – Schweinfurt	Hourly
