= Schweinfurt Hauptbahnhof =

Railway station in Schweinfurt, Germany

Schweinfurt Hbf
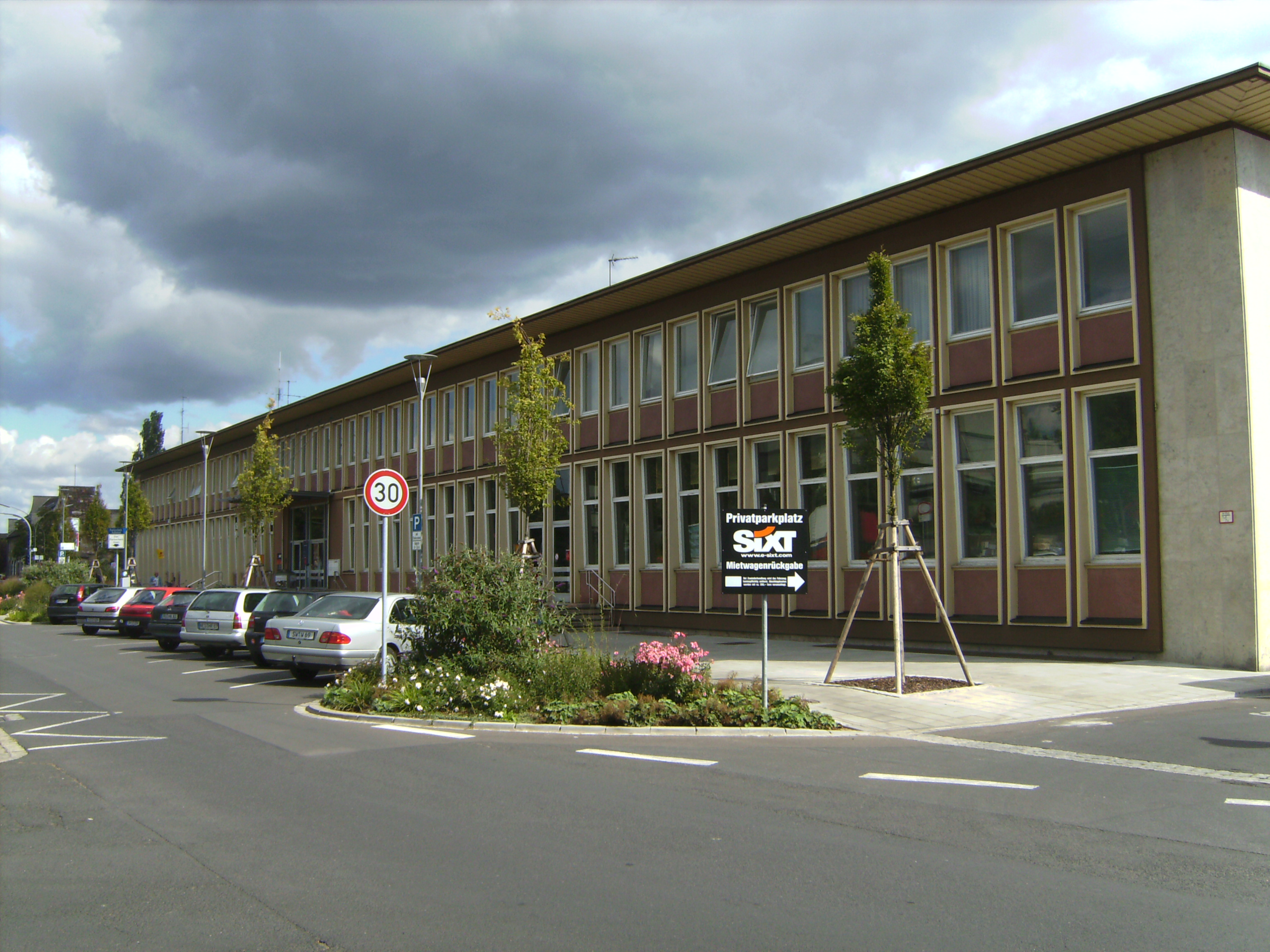
- Station building

General information
- Location: Schweinfurt, Bavaria; Germany
- Coordinates: 50°2′8″N 10°12′42″E
- Lines: Würzburg–Schweinfurt–Bamberg (KBS 810); Schweinfurt–Mellrichstadt–Meiningen (KBS 815); Gemünden–Bad Kissingen–Schweinfurt (KBS 803); Schweinfurt–Kitzingen-Etwashausen (KBS 809)
- Platforms: 7

Other information
- Station code: 5742
- DS100 code: NS
- Category: 3
- Fare zone: NVM: B/500
- Website: www.bahnhof.de

Services
| Preceding station | DB Regio Südost | Following station |
|---|---|---|
| Würzburg Hbf Terminus | RE 7 | Ebenhausen (Unterfr) towards Erfurt Hbf |
| Würzburg Hbf Terminus | RE 57 | Ebenhausen (Unterfr) towards Bad Kissingen |
| Preceding station | DB Regio Bayern | Following station |
| Würzburg Hbf Terminus | RE 20 | Haßfurt towards Nürnberg Hbf |
| Würzburg Hbf towards Frankfurt (Main) Hbf | RE 54 | Haßfurt towards Bamberg |
| Gemünden (Main) towards Frankfurt (Main) Hbf | RE 55 Sa+Su | Haßfurt towards Bamberg |
| Waigolshausen towards Schlüchtern | RB 53 | Schweinfurt Mitte towards Bamberg |
| Preceding station | | Following station |
| Schweinfurt Mitte towards Schweinfurt Stadt | RB 40 | Oberwerrn towards Meiningen |
| Oberwerrn towards Gemünden (Main) | RB 50 | Schweinfurt Mitte towards Schweinfurt Stadt |
Location
- Location within Bavaria Location within Germany

Schweinfurt Hauptbahnhof is the largest railway station in the Lower Franconian city of Schweinfurt and its transfer hub to the majority of regional buses. In addition to the Hauptbahnhof, the Schweinfurt Mitte (Schweinfurt Central) and Schweinfurt Stadt (Schweinfurt Town) stations also lie within the city, closer to the centre, on the Bamberg–Würzburg railway.

== Importance ==
The station is no longer served by long-distance traffic since the introduction of the Interregio line from Stuttgart via Würzburg and Schweinfurt to Erfurt in 2001. It still has an important role, however, in regional and local rail services.

There are currently passenger services on the following lines:

- KBS 803 (Schweinfurt–) Bad Kissingen–Gemünden (Main) (Franconian Saale Valley Railway), single-tracked main line
- KBS 810 Würzburg–Schweinfurt–Haßfurt–Bamberg (Bamberg–Würzburg railway), double-tracked main line
- KBS 815/570 Schweinfurt–Bad Neustadt (Saale)–Meiningen /–Erfurt (Schweinfurt–Meiningen railway), single-tracked main line

On the single-tracked branch line Kitzingen–Schweinfurt there is still goods traffic between Gochsheim and Schweinfurt, the rest of the line to Kitzingen-Etwashausen is unused.

=== Links to regional and local services ===
Schweinfurt Hauptbahnhof is embedded in the Deutsche Bahn network as shown below (as at: 2006/2007 timetable):

| Train type | Route | Services |
|---|---|---|
| Regional-Express | Würzburg–Schweinfurt–Bamberg–Lichtenfels–Hof /–Bayreuth | Every two hours |
| Regional-Express (Mainfranken-Thüringen-Express) | Würzburg–Schweinfurt–Bad Kissingen /– Mellrichstadt station–Grimmenthal–Erfurt | Every two hours |
| Regional-Express | Schweinfurt–Bamberg–Erlangen–Nürnberg | Every two hours |
| Regionalbahn (RB 53) | (Schlüchtern–) Jossa–Gemünden (Main)–Würzburg–Schweinfurt (–Bamberg) | Hourly to Würzburg; Every two hours to Bamberg |
| Erfurter Bahn (RB 40) (Unterfranken-Shuttle) | Schweinfurt–Bad Kissingen /–Meiningen | Every two hours |
| Erfurter Bahn (RB 50) (Unterfranken-Shuttle) | Schweinfurt–Bad Kissingen–Gemünden (Main) | Every two hours |

Schweinfurt Hbf is a timetable hub (Taktknoten), i.e. every hour on the hour trains arrive on the three main lines and depart shortly after the hour again. Included in this system are the three Regional-Express links and the trains of EIB Line 4. There is an hourly service to Würzburg and Bamberg which is achieved by overlapping the two RE lines, and on the routes to Bad Kissingen and Meiningen/Erfurt there is also an hourly service which alternates between RE and EIB trains. On the Würzburg–Bamberg route the frequency of RE trains is supplemented by the use of RegionalBahn services; likewise the EIB Linie 5 Schweinfurt–Gemünden (Main), bolsters the section to Bad Kissingen.

== Infrastructure ==
=== Station building ===
The station building at Schweinfurt Hauptbahnhof is on the north side of the tracks. After the original building had been destroyed by bomb attacks in the Second World War, a modern, functional building was erected after the war in the style of the 1950s. The two-storey building houses a Deutsche Bahn travel centre (ReiseZentrum), toilets, lockers and several shops.

=== Traffic station ===
The station has five through platforms for passengers. Two bay platforms directly in front of the station building are no longer needed for scheduled services since trains from Bad Kissingen and Meiningen now pass through the Hauptbahnhof and stop at the more centrally-sited Schweinfurt Stadt station. All platforms have a height of 38 cm and are accessed by flights of stairs from an underpass.
