= Schweinfurt Mitte station =

Railway halt in Schweinfurt, Germany

Schweinfurt Mitte
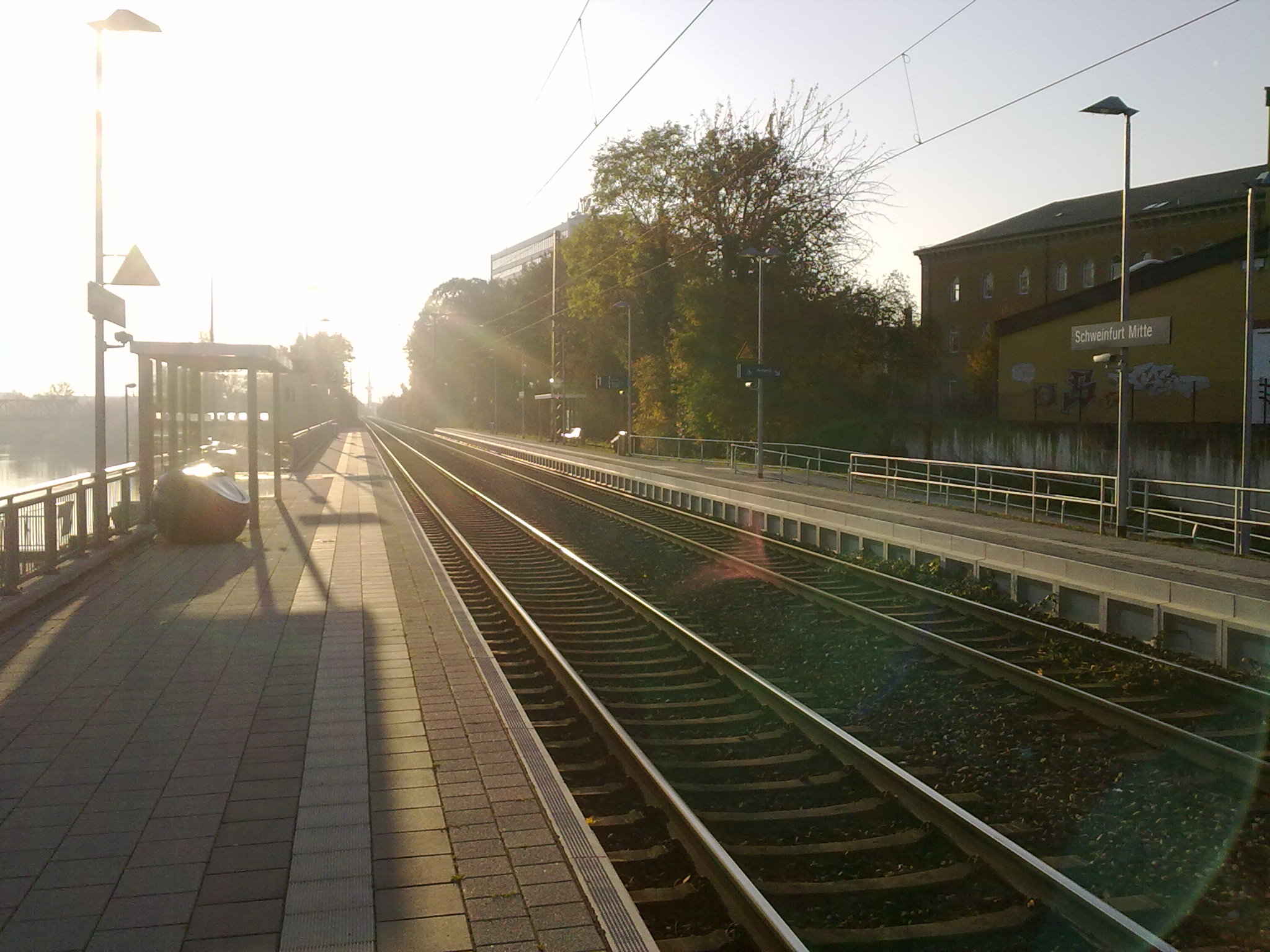
- 2010

General information
- Location: Schweinfurt, Bavaria; Germany
- Coordinates: 50°02′26″N 10°13′48″E,
- Owner: Deutsche Bahn
- Operator: DB Station&Service
- Line: Bamberg–Rottendorf railway
- Platforms: 2

Other information
- Station code: 4926
- DS100 code: NSMT
- Category: 6
- Fare zone: NVM: B/500
- Website: www.bahnhof.de; stationsdatenbank

Services
Preceding station	DB Regio Bayern	Following station
Schweinfurt Hbf towards Schlüchtern	RB 53	Schweinfurt Stadt towards Bamberg
Preceding station		Following station
Schweinfurt Stadt Terminus	RB 40	Schweinfurt Hbf towards Meiningen
Schweinfurt Hbf towards Gemünden (Main)	RB 50	Schweinfurt Stadt Terminus
Location
- Location within Bavaria Location within Germany

Schweinfurt Mitte (German for Schweinfurt Central) is a railway station in the Lower Franconian city of Schweinfurt, Germany. It is located close to the city centre, and is served by regional trains.
