= Karlstadt (Main) station =

Railway station in Karlstadt am Main, Germany

Karlstadt (Main)
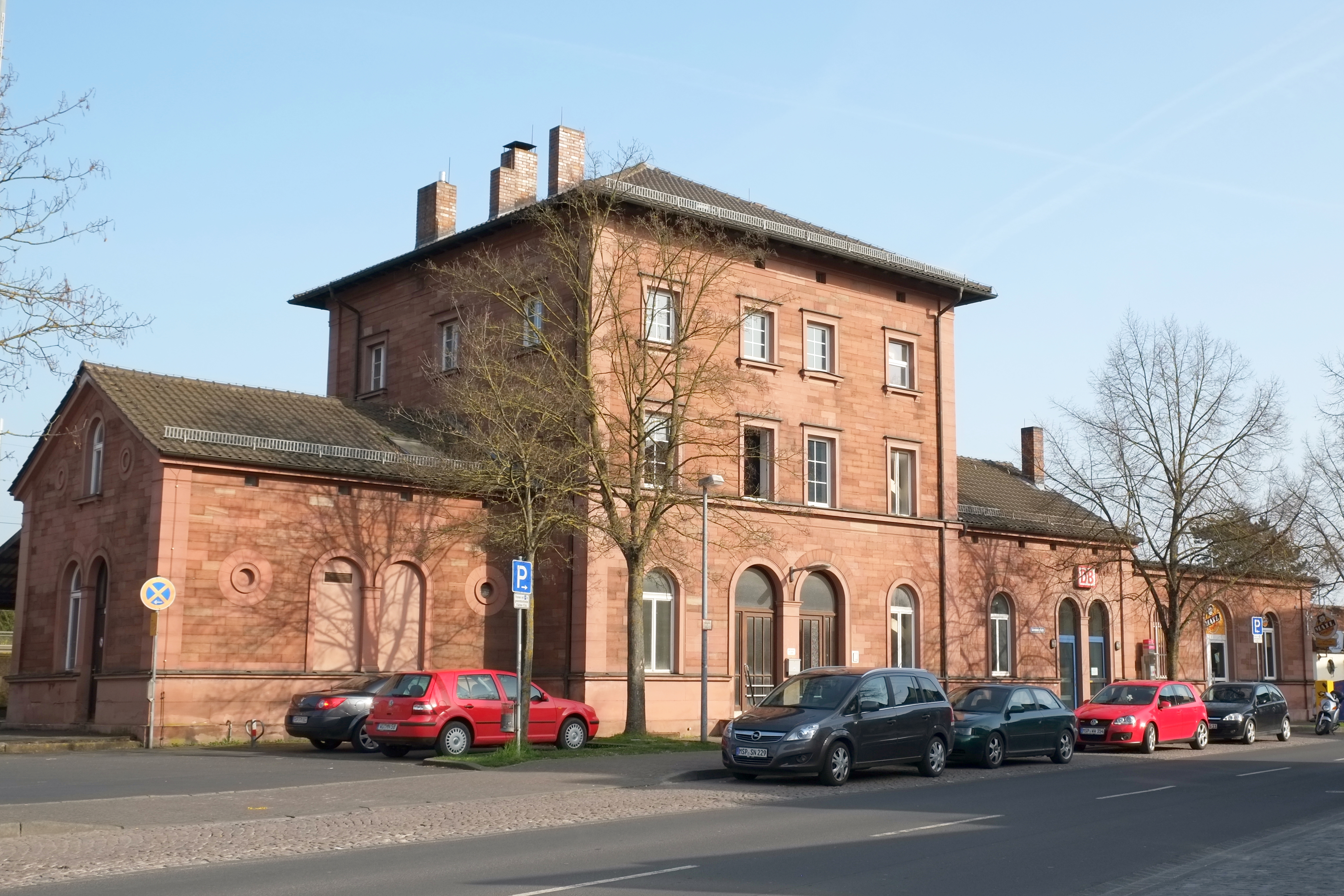
- 2014

General information
- Location: Bahnhofplatz 1; 97753 Karlstadt am Main; Bavaria; Germany
- Coordinates: 49.9629°N 9.7679°E
- System: Bf
- Owner: Deutsche Bahn
- Operator: DB Station&Service
- Lines: Main–Spessart railway (KBS 800)
- Platforms: 1 island platform 1 side platform
- Tracks: 3
- Train operators: DB Regio Bayern
- Connections: 8060 8065 8067 8068 8099 8140

Construction
- Parking: yes
- Cycle facilities: yes
- Accessible: partly

Other information
- Station code: 3114
- DS100 code: NKA
- IBNR: 8003189
- Category: 4
- Fare zone: NVM: B/373
- Website: www.bahnhof.de

Services
Preceding station	DB Regio Bayern	Following station
Gemünden (Main) towards Frankfurt (Main) Hbf	RE 54	Retzbach-Zellingen towards Bamberg
Gemünden (Main) towards Frankfurt (Main) Hbf	RE 55	Retzbach-Zellingen towards Würzburg Hbf
Wernfeld towards Schlüchtern	RB 53	Himmelstadt towards Bamberg
Wernfeld towards Aschaffenburg Hbf	RB 79	Himmelstadt towards Würzburg Hbf
Location
- Location within Bavaria Location within Germany Location within Europe

Karlstadt (Main) station (German: Bahnhof Karlstadt (Main)) is a railway station in the municipality of Karlstadt am Main, located in the Main-Spessart district in Bavaria, Germany.
