= Bamberg–Rottendorf railway =

Railway line in Upper and Lower Franconia, Germany

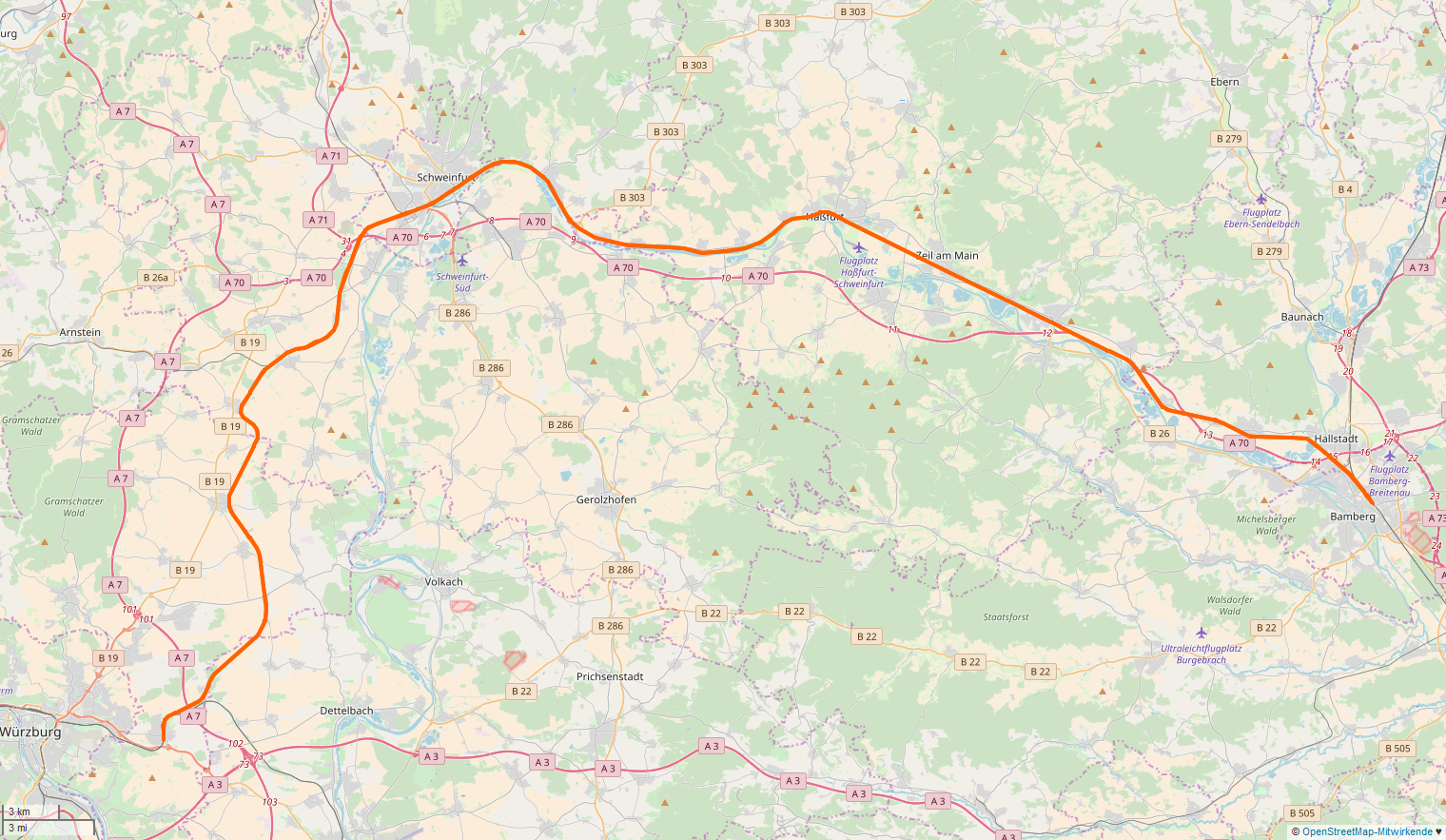

Overview
- Status: Operational
- Owner: Deutsche Bahn
- Line number: 5102
- Locale: Bavaria, Germany
- Termini: Bamberg; Rottendorf
- Stations: 14

Service
- Type: Heavy rail, Passenger/Freight rail Regional rail
- Route number: 810
- Operator(s): DB Regio; Erfurter Bahn
- Rolling stock: DBAG Class 612; DBAG Class 440; DBAG Class 146; Stadler Regio-Shuttle RS1

History
- Opened: Stages between 1852–1854

Technical
- Line length: 92.2 km (57.3 mi)
- Number of tracks: Double track
- Track gauge: 1,435 mm (4 ft 8 1/2 in) standard gauge
- Electrification: 15 kV/16.7 Hz AC overhead catenary
- Operating speed: 160 km/h (99 mph)

The Bamberg–Rottendorf railway is a two-track electrified main line railway in the German state of Bavaria. It is about 100 kilometres long and was built by the Royal Bavarian State Railways as part of the Ludwig's Western Railway (German: Ludwigs-West-Bahn) from Bamberg via Haßfurt and Schweinfurt to Würzburg. Between Bamberg and Schweinfurt, the line runs largely along the Main river. The line was opened in sections between 1852 and 1854 and is one of the oldest railways in Germany.

== History ==
Before the completion of the modern direct route via Rottendorf, Kitzingen, Neustadt an der Aisch and Fürth, which could not initially be built because of the difficult terrain in the Steigerwald area, the eastern part of the Ludwig's Western Railway was of great importance for east-west long-distance traffic. As a result of the opening of the direct line in 1865, the Würzburg–Bamberg line is now mainly significant for regional and local transport. Until the division of Germany in 1945, more long-distance trains to Thuringia and Saxony used the Würzburg–Schweinfurt line than the line via Hof. In 1978, faster regional services were established, accompanied by the closure of several stations, as was the case on many lines in Germany during the 1970s and 1980s. InterRegio train services ran on the Stuttgart–Würzburg–Schweinfurt–Erfurt route from soon after German reunification until 2001.

=== Opening dates ===
The line was opened in three stages from Bamberg from 1852 to 1854:

- 1 August 1852: Bamberg–Haßfurt
- 3 November 1852: Haßfurt–Schweinfurt
- 1 July 1854: Schweinfurt–Würzburg

Further development of the line to create additional capacity to handle increased traffic was necessary over the years:

- 1897: duplication between Schweinfurt and Waigolshausen
- 1905–1908: duplication between Bamberg and Schweinfurt and between Waigolshausen and Würzburg
- 1984: adding of the third line between Würzburg and Rottendorf

In addition, on 1 July 1864, a new railway station was opened in Würzburg, as the old Ludwigsbahnhof (Ludwig’s station) in the city centre had to be closed because it was unable to cope with the increase in traffic.

=== Electrification ===
In 1954 and in 1971 and 1972 overhead wire was erected over the track in three sections:

- 3 October 1954: Würzburg–Rottendorf
- 22 September 1971: Waigolshausen–Bamberg
- 26 May 1972: Rottendorf–Waigolshausen

== Current services ==
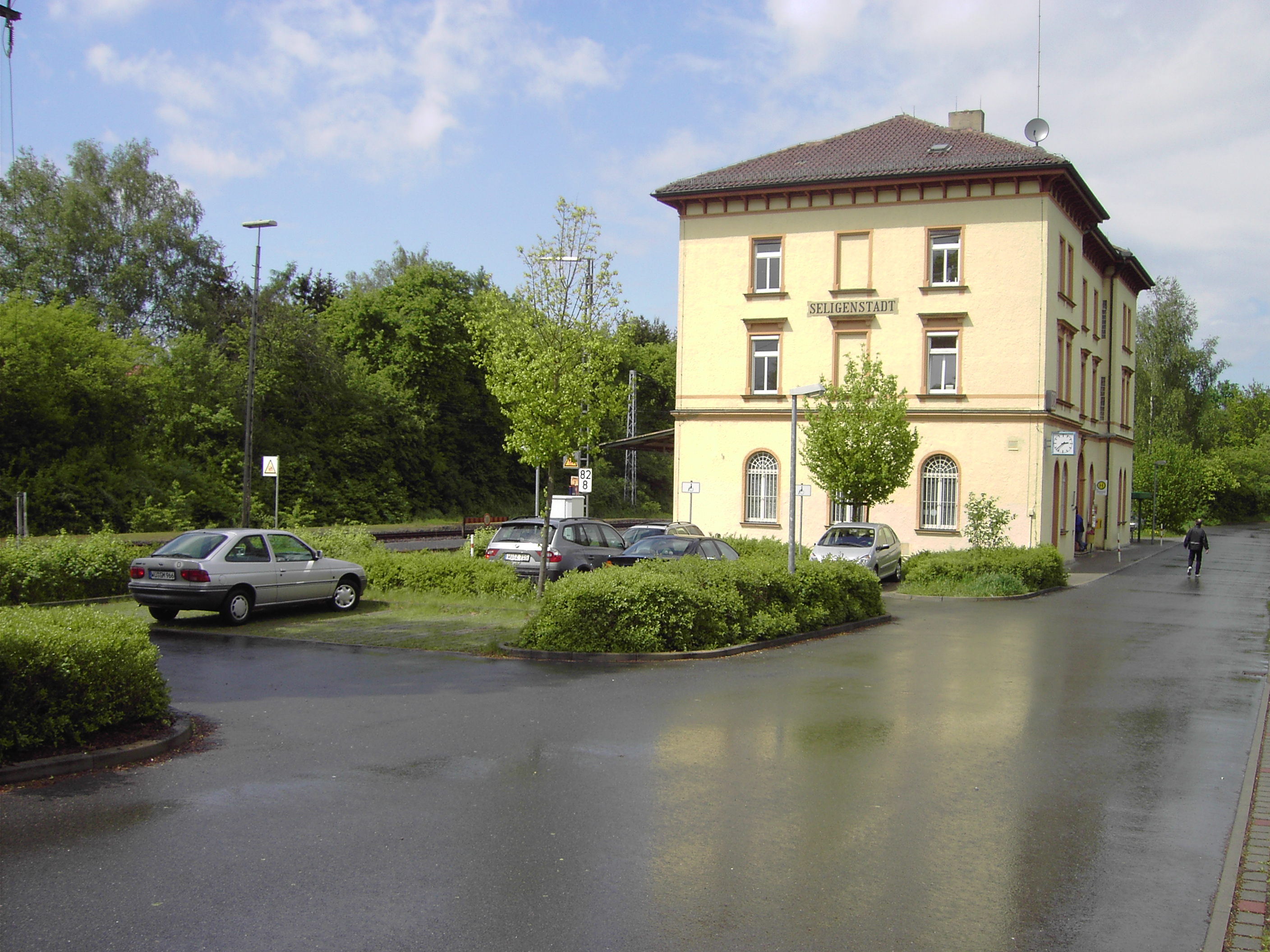
Seligenstadt (b Würzburg) station

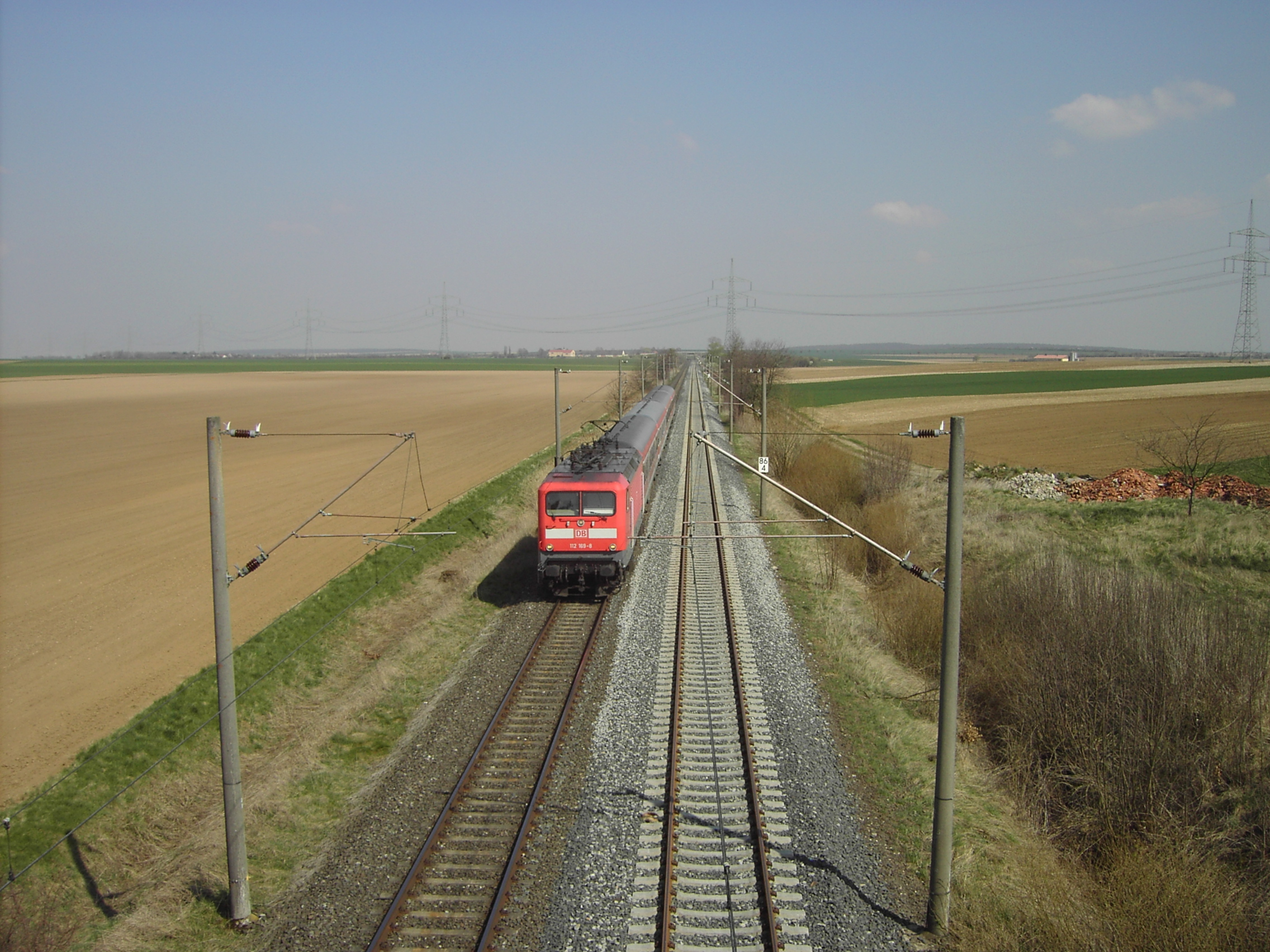
Regionalbahn train between Seligenstadt and Rottendorf

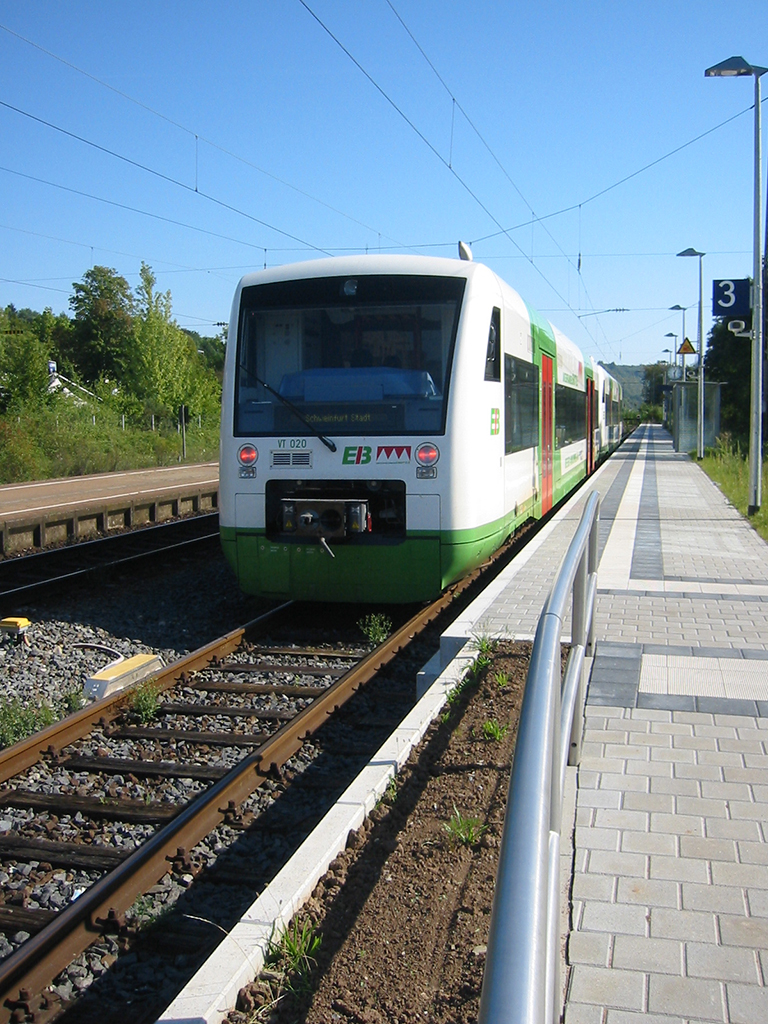
A Regio-Shuttle of the Erfurter Bahn in Schweinfurt Stadt station

Since the timetable change in December 2004, Regional-Express trains have run every two hours, generally with two routes overlapping to provide hourly services on most sections. Specifically, trains run on the following lines:

- Würzburg–Schweinfurt–Bad Kissingen/Mellrichstadt–Suhl–Erfurt
- Würzburg–Schweinfurt–Haßfurt–Bamberg–Lichtenfels–Hof/Bayreuth
- Würzburg–Schweinfurt–Haßfurt–Bamberg–Forchheim–Erlangen–Fürth–Nürnberg

Modern vehicles are exclusively used on the three lines. The first two lines because of their winding routes are operated with class 612 tilting trains, mostly in sets of three. From December 2004, services on the Schweinfurt–Nuremberg route were hauled at first by class 111 locomotives with five double-deck carriages (built in 1997), but with a top speed of 140 km / h only. However, the one-hour service required to allow regular connections to and from trains on the Erfurt–Würzburg line made trains with a stop speed of 160 km / h necessary. DB Regio therefore procured eight new five-car sets, which have been hauled since December 2005 by eight new class 146 locomotives, saving several minutes on the line. Regional-Express trains stop only at the stations of Bamberg, Haßfurt, Schweinfurt and Würzburg on the 100-kilometre route.

Regionalbahn services also supplement the Regional Express train services. Services run hourly on the Würzburg–Schweinfurt line, continuing every two hours to Bamberg. Trains terminating in Schweinfurt in some cases continue to Schweinfurt Stadt station. On the Haßfurt–Bamberg section extra services run, increasing services to an hourly frequency. The trains are usually composed of a class 111 or class 143 locomotives and four or five Silberling carriages.
