= Rentwertshausen =

Coordinates: 50°27′N 10°26′E

Rentwertshausen is a former municipality in the district Schmalkalden-Meiningen, in Thuringia, Germany. From December 1, 2007, it is part of Grabfeld.
