= Gemünden (Main) station =

Railway station in Germany

Gemünden (Main)
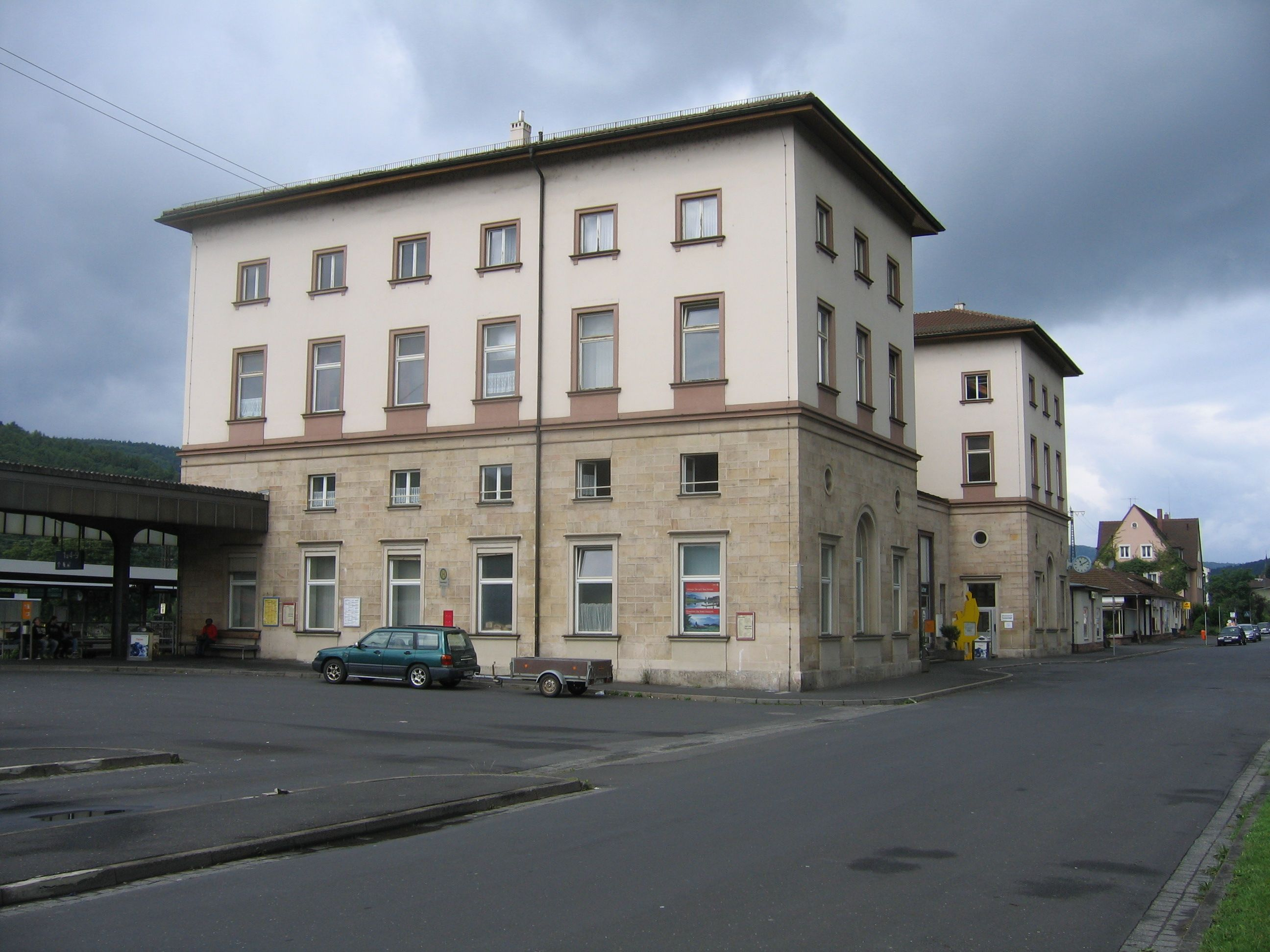
- Gemünden station, street side

General information
- Location: Gemünden am Main, Bavaria; Germany
- Coordinates: 50°3′0″N 9°42′0″E
- Owner: Deutsche Bahn
- Operator: DB Station&Service
- Lines: Flieden–Gemünden railway (km 56.3); Würzburg–Aschaffenburg railway (km 37.8) (KBS 800); Gemünden–Ebenhausen railway (km 0.0) (KBS 815); Waigolshausen–Gemünden railway (km 39.7)
- Platforms: 8

Construction
- Accessible: No

Other information
- Station code: 2060
- DS100 code: NGM
- IBNR: 8000120
- Category: 4
- Fare zone: NVM: B/357
- Website: www.bahnhof.de; stationsdatenbank.de

History
- Opened: 1 October 1854

Passengers
- ca. 10,000

Services
Preceding station	DB Regio Bayern	Following station
Langenprozelten towards Frankfurt (Main) Hbf	RE 54	Karlstadt (Main) towards Bamberg
Langenprozelten towards Frankfurt (Main) Hbf	RE 55	Karlstadt (Main) towards Würzburg Hbf
Langenprozelten towards Frankfurt (Main) Hbf	RE 55	Schweinfurt Hbf Limited Sa+Su services towards Bamberg
Rieneck towards Schlüchtern	RB 53	Wernfeld towards Bamberg
Langenprozelten towards Aschaffenburg Hbf	RB 79	Wernfeld towards Würzburg Hbf
Preceding station		Following station
Terminus	RB 50	Kleingemünden towards Schweinfurt Stadt
Location
- Location within Bavaria Location within Germany Location within Europe

Gemünden (Main) station is a station in the town of Gemünden am Main in the Main-Spessart district of the German state of Bavaria on the Flieden–Gemünden railway. It was opened on 1 October 1854. The station is classified by Deutsche Bahn (DB) as a category 4 station.

== Station category ==
After the completion of the Hanover–Würzburg high-speed railway, the station, which had previously been classified as a "regional node" (category 3), was downgraded to category 5 ("local traffic stop"), of the then six categories because from that time nearly all intercity services were routed over the high speed line. Up to the timetable of 2008 there were still occasional Intercity services, but since then long-distance services have been abandoned completely.

With the reassignment of station categories on 1 January 2011 using objective and quantitative criteria, the station was reclassified as category 4 of the current seven categories.

== Operations ==
The Gemünden train station is now served only by the following regional services (as of the 2016 timetable):

Line	Route	Interval
RE 54	Main-Spessart-Express; Frankfurt – Maintal – Aschaffenburg – Gemünden – Würzburg – Schweinfurt – Haßfurt – Bamberg	Every 2 Hours
RE 55	Main-Spessart-Express; Frankfurt – Offenbach – Aschaffenburg – Gemünden – Würzburg (– Schweinfurt – Haßfurt – Bamberg)	Every 2 Hours
RB 53	Mainfrankenbahn: (Schlüchtern –) Jossa – Gemünden (– Würzburg – Schweinfurt – Bamberg)	Hourly
RB 79	Aschaffenburg – Heigenbrücken – Lohr – Gemünden – Würzburg	Some trains
RB 50	Gemünden – Bad Kissingen – Ebenhausen – Schweinfurt	Hourly with gaps
