= Oerlenbach =

- Municipality
- Coat of arms

- Location of Oerlenbach within Bad Kissingen district
- Interactive map of Oerlenbach
- Location within Germany Location within Bavaria
- Coordinates: 50°09′N 10°08′E
- Country: Germany
- State: Bavaria
- Admin. region: Unterfranken
- District: Bad Kissingen
- Subdivisions: 8 Ortsteile

Government
  - Mayor (2020–26): Nico Rogge

Area
  - Total: 33.41 km^{2} (12.90 sq mi)
- Elevation: 304 m (997 ft)

Population (2025-12-31)
  - Total: 5,052
  - Density: 151.2/km^{2} (391.6/sq mi)
- Time zone: UTC+01:00 (CET)
  - Summer (DST): UTC+02:00 (CEST)
- Postal codes: 97714
- Dialling codes: 09725, 09738
- Vehicle registration: KG, BRK, HAB
- Website: www.oerlenbach.de

Oerlenbach is a municipality in the district of Bad Kissingen in Bavaria in Germany.

== Twin towns ==
Douvres-la-Délivrande, France
