= Gemünden–Ebenhausen railway =

Railway line in Bavaria, Germany

Gemünden–Ebenhausen Railway
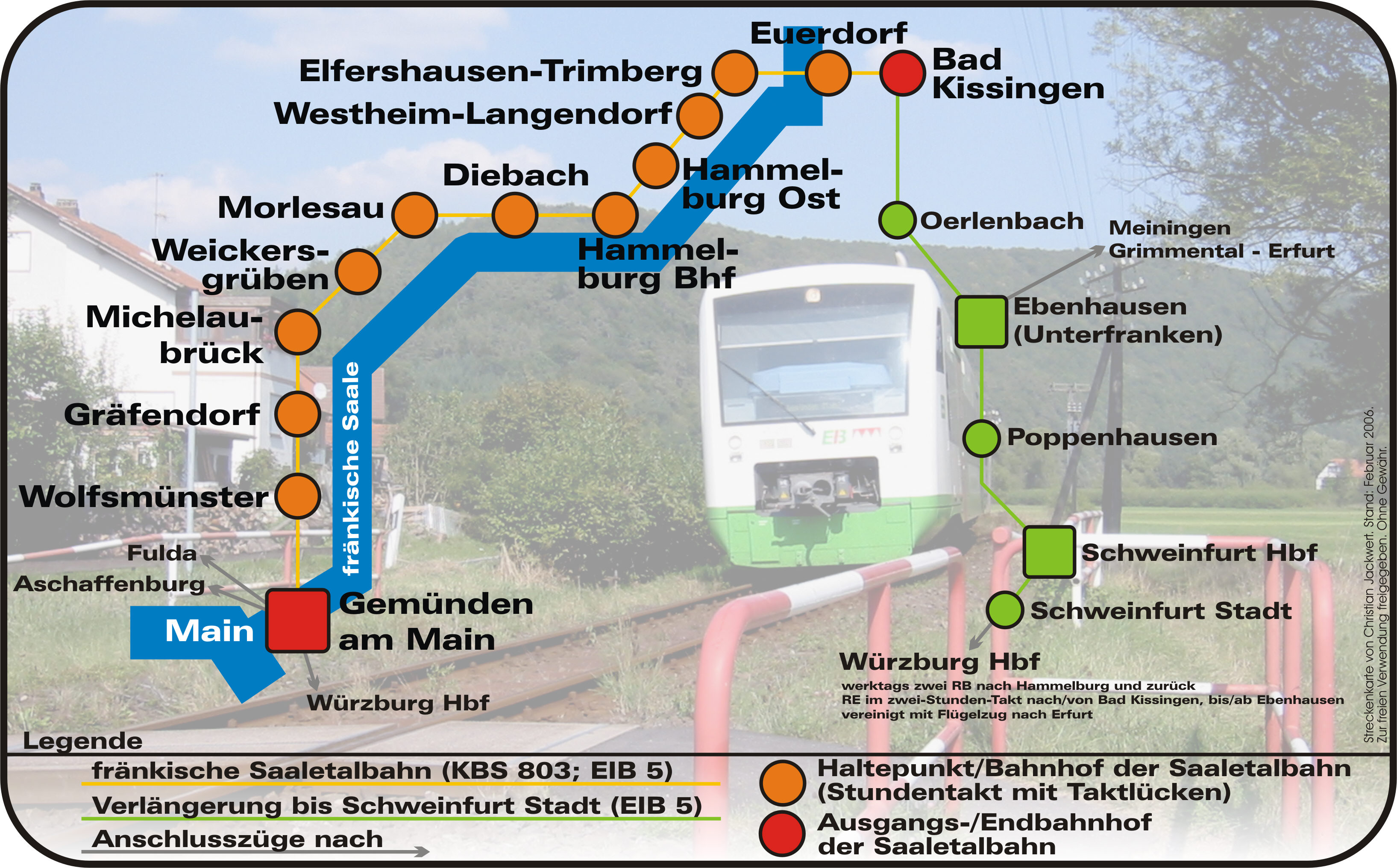
- line map

Overview
- Line number: 803
- Locale: Bavaria, Germany

Service
- Route number: 5210, 5233

Technical
- Line length: 56.3 km (35.0 mi)
- Track gauge: 1,435 mm (4 ft 8 1/2 in) standard gauge
- Operating speed: 80 km/h (50 mph)

The Gemünden–Ebenhausen Railway is a 55 kilometre long, single-tracked, railway line in the northern part of the province of Lower Franconia in Bavaria, Germany. It runs from Gemünden (Main) via Bad Kissingen to Ebenhausen and follows, for most of the way, the Franconian Saale (Fränkische Saale) river.

== Route ==
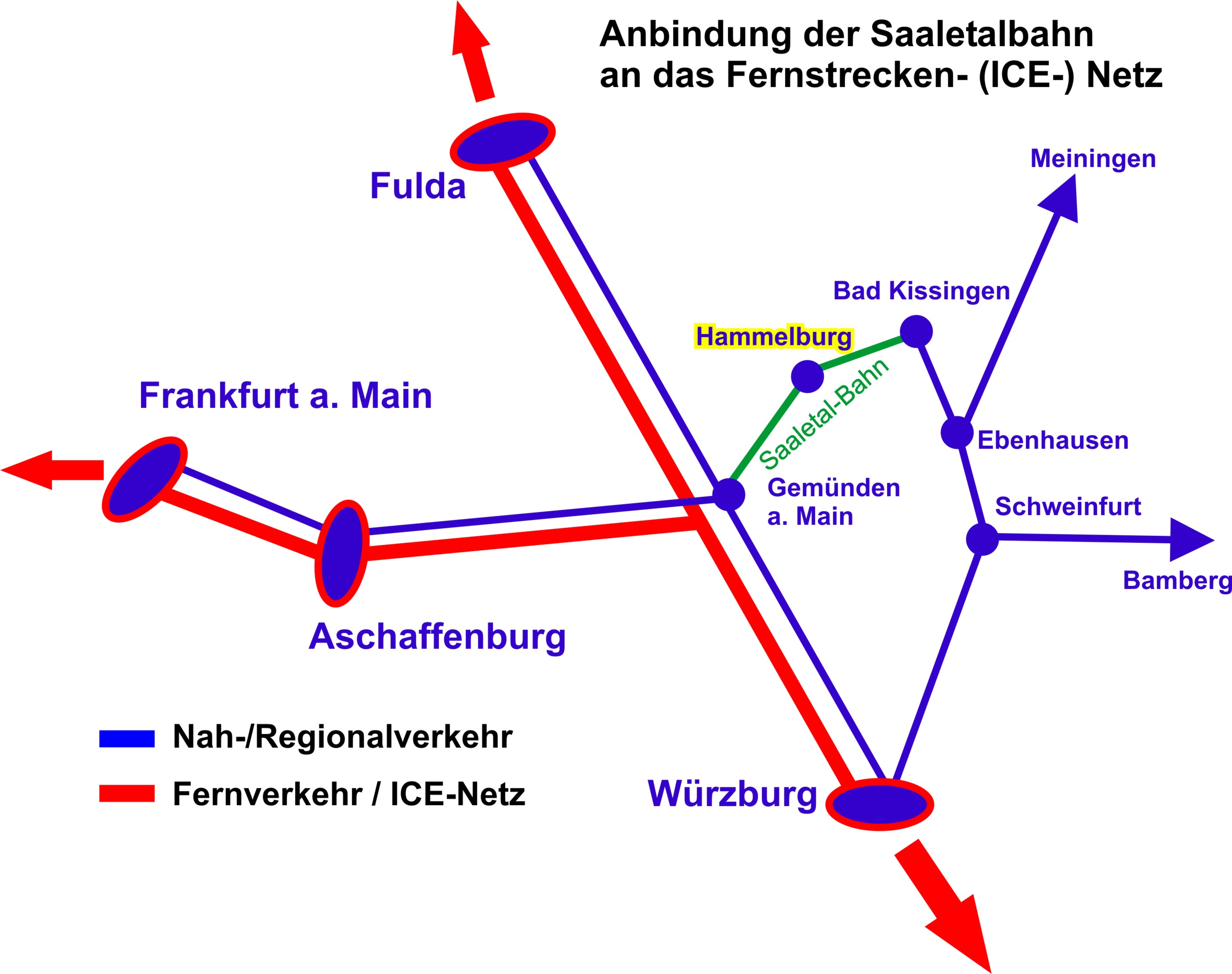
Connexion of the Saale valley railway to long-distance rail traffic

The Saale Valley Railway leaves Gemünden (Main) initially in a northerly direction on the line to Jossa, part of the old Flieden–Gemünden railway, before it branches off to the east after 1.3 km to follow the Saale Valley. It runs along the Franconian Saale from Gemünden until just short of Euerdorf, the river being almost always within view. As a result, the line often describes long curves as it runs through the mixed and pine forests of the greenbelt recreation region and out over the open countryside with good views. Beyond Euerdorf it leaves the valley floor in order to reach the higher-lying station at Bad Kissingen and the old section of line from Ebenhausen to Bad Kissingen.

The Saale Valley Railway begins in Gemünden am Main, where it branches away from the double-tracked, electrified main line from Würzburg to Aschaffenburg (the Main-Spessart Railway) as a single-tracked unelectrified main line. The halts follow, sometimes thick and fast, because even smaller villages are served; the rapid acceleration of the trains employed is largely able to cope with that. The terminus of the Saale Valley Railway, both historically and geographically, is Bad Kissingen although, as far as the timetable is concerned, the section from Bad Kissingen to Ebenhausen, part of the former stub line from Schweinfurt, is included in as route no. 803.

Since the 1970s the branches of the line from Gemünden and Ebenhausen share one track for the last 1.3 kilometres. In former times both routes had their own tracks that ran parallel to one another into the station.

== History ==
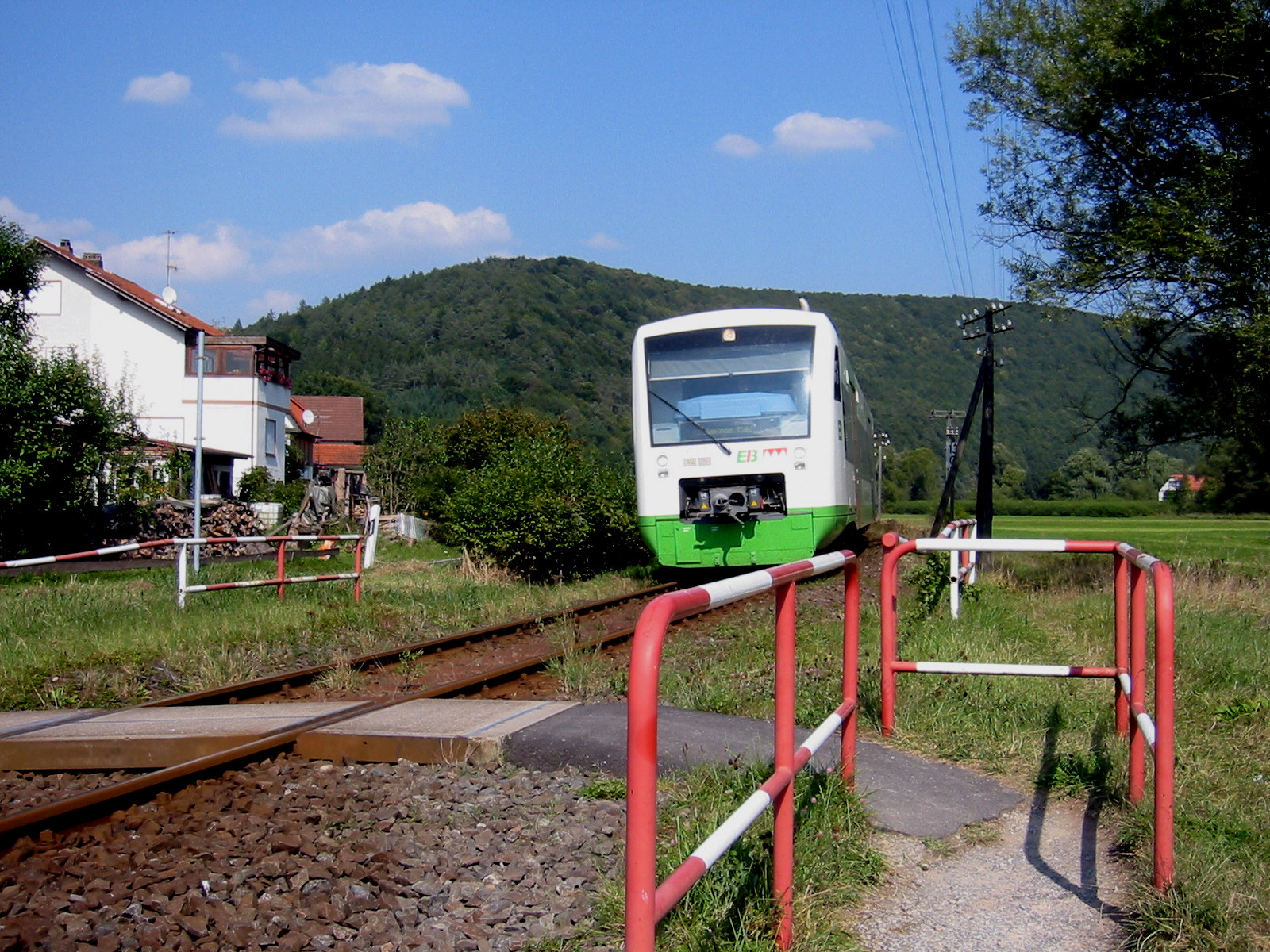
A multiple of the Lower Franconia Shuttle on the Saale Valley Railway

The spa town of Bad Kissingen was given its first link to the railway network on 9 October 1871 in the shape of a 20 kilometre long stub line from Schweinfurt, after attempts to gain approval for a through route from Gemünden (Main) to Meiningen foundered. After that little hope was envisaged for opening up the Saale Valley to the railway. Nevertheless, on 1 July 1884 a second stub was opened by the Royal Bavarian State Railways from Gemünden am Main to Hammelburg. After forty years, on 15 April 1924 the gap between Hammelburg and Bad Kissingen was finally closed and the through line taken into service.

The line, now a through route, initially developed an increasing importance; but the car-oriented 1960s led to a significant reduction in timetabled services. Only its incorporation into the statewide Bayern-Takt (Bavarian fixed-interval service) saw a return to a two-hourly through service on most of the Saale Valley Line, reinforced by an hourly service between Bad Kissingen and Ebenhausen.

=== Use today ===
The line is important for tourism both from and into the Spessart and Rhön nature parks and their associated greenbelt recreation areas, as well as for travellers to and from the spa town of Bad Kissingen. In addition it has the typical function of a regional railway line serving commuters, schoolchildren and families, and supporting regional freight traffic, especially wood. The Bundeswehr barracks in Hammelburg is also a factor.

== Railway stock ==
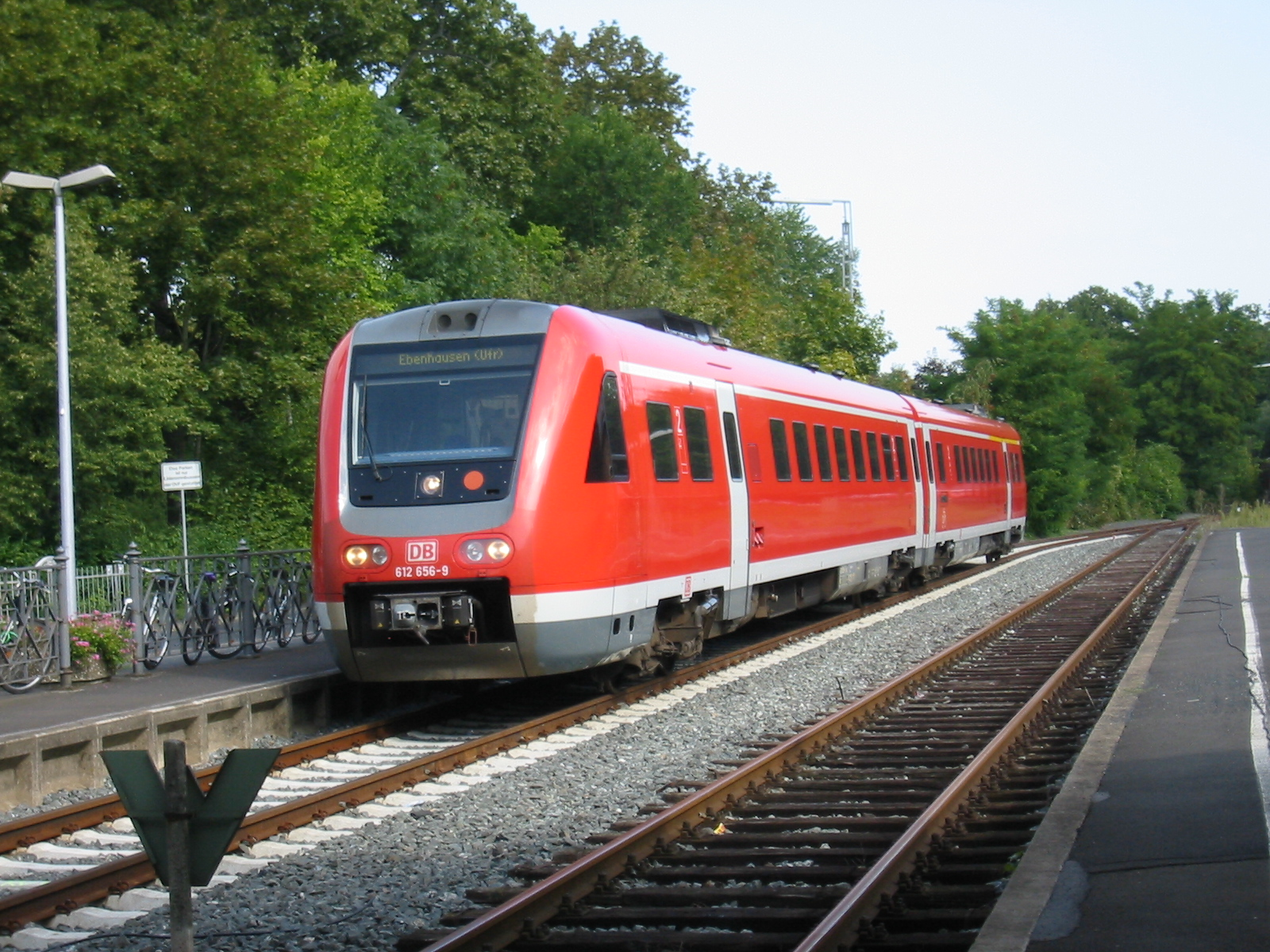
Deutsche Bahn AG tilting VT 612 DMU in Bad Kissingen

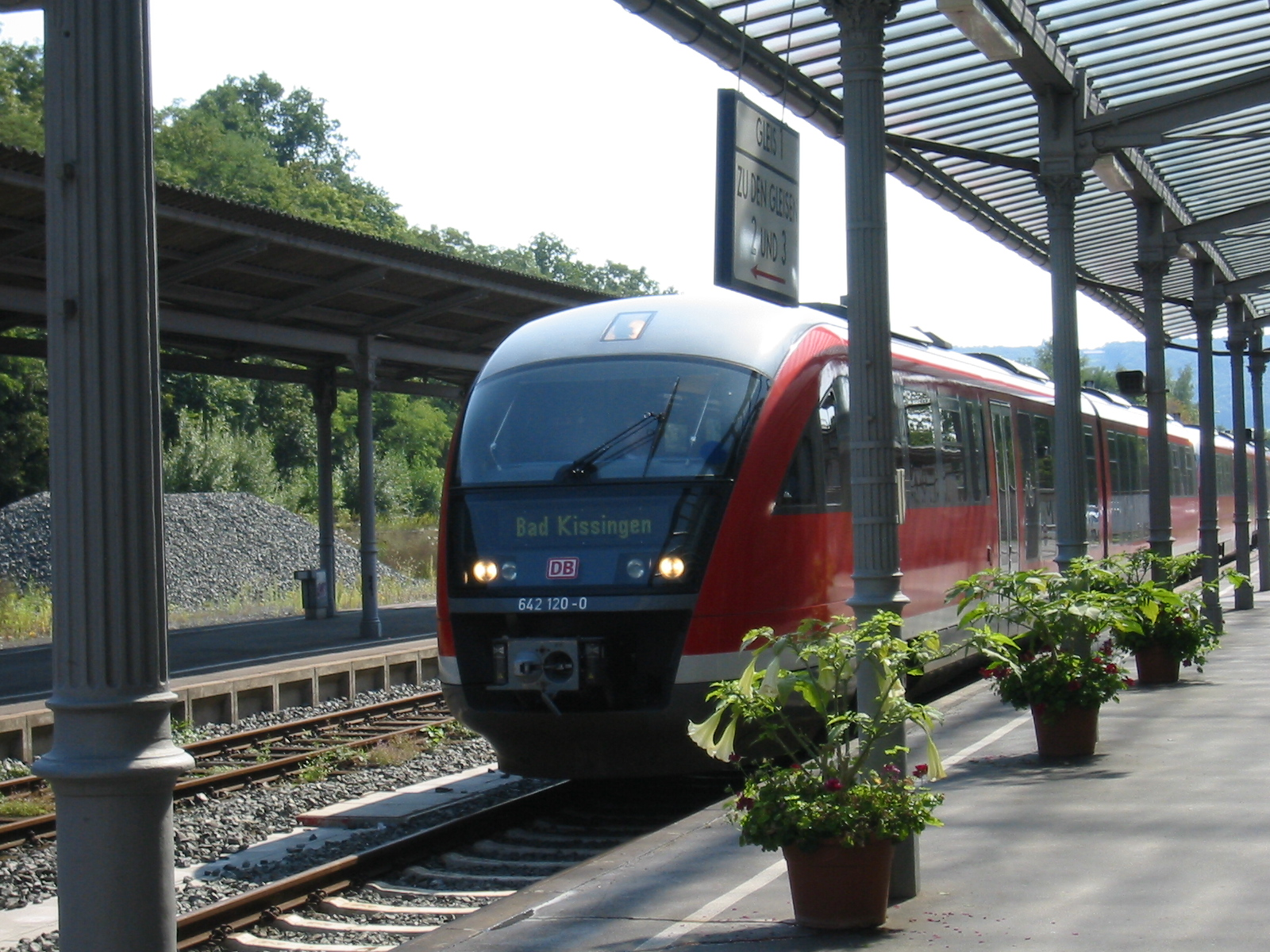
Deutsche Bahn AG VT 642 DMU in Bad Kissingen

With the delivery of the DB Class 614 in the early 1970s the Saale Valley Railway received its first modern railway vehicles during the Deutsche Bundesbahn (DB) era. These were withdrawn from the line towards the end of the 1980s, and their place was taken for a long time thereafter by Class V 100 diesel locomotives (Deutsche Bahn AG Class 212) again, this time with one normal coach and a driving coach. Around the turn of the century the DBAG recognised that these, almost 40-year-old locomotives and the hardly more recent coaches were no longer up to date. After a short time when old railbuses visited the line, the modern diesel multiple units of DBAG Class 642 became their successors.

A short time later the tender for local railway services from the Bavarian Railway Company (Bayerische Eisenbahngesellschaft) was won by Erfurter Bahn. After the timetable change on 12 December 2004 it took over services on route no. KBS 803 under the name Lower Franconia Shuttle (Unterfranken-Shuttle), that planned through services as far as Schweinfurt Stadt station. The EIB procured twenty RegioShuttle RS1 multiples for this purpose. These single-coach diesel railbuses are designed for rapid and easy coupling or uncoupling using Scharfenberg couplers. Panoramic windows, cushioned seats and air-conditioning offer high levels of comfort. On the Saale Valley Railway the DB's ticket machines were removed, because the EIB arranged for ticket machines in the train. Both DB and EIB tickets are accepted by the other organisation. In addition, since the end of 2005 there has been a special Franconian Saale Valley Ticket (Fränkisches Saaletal Ticket) for return journeys between Bad Kissingen and Gemünden am Main for one person.

Bad Kissingen is served every two hours by DB RegionalExpress trains from Würzburg using tilting Class 612 units. Two pairs of trains on this service travel as far as Hammelburg each day.

There are connections in Gemünden am Main to Schlüchtern, Aschaffenburg and Würzburg; and in Ebenhausen to Erfurt and Meiningen.

DBAG Class 294 locomotives are frequently used in charge of goods trains. Freight trains only run on Tuesdays and Thursdays to Hammelburg, travelling from Schweinfurt via Gemünden. Wood is the main product transported. Occasionally Bundeswehr troop trains may also be seen.

== See also ==
- List of scheduled railway routes in Germany
- List of railway stations in Bavaria
