= Schweinfurt Stadt station =

Railway station in Schweinfurt, Germany

Schweinfurt Stadt
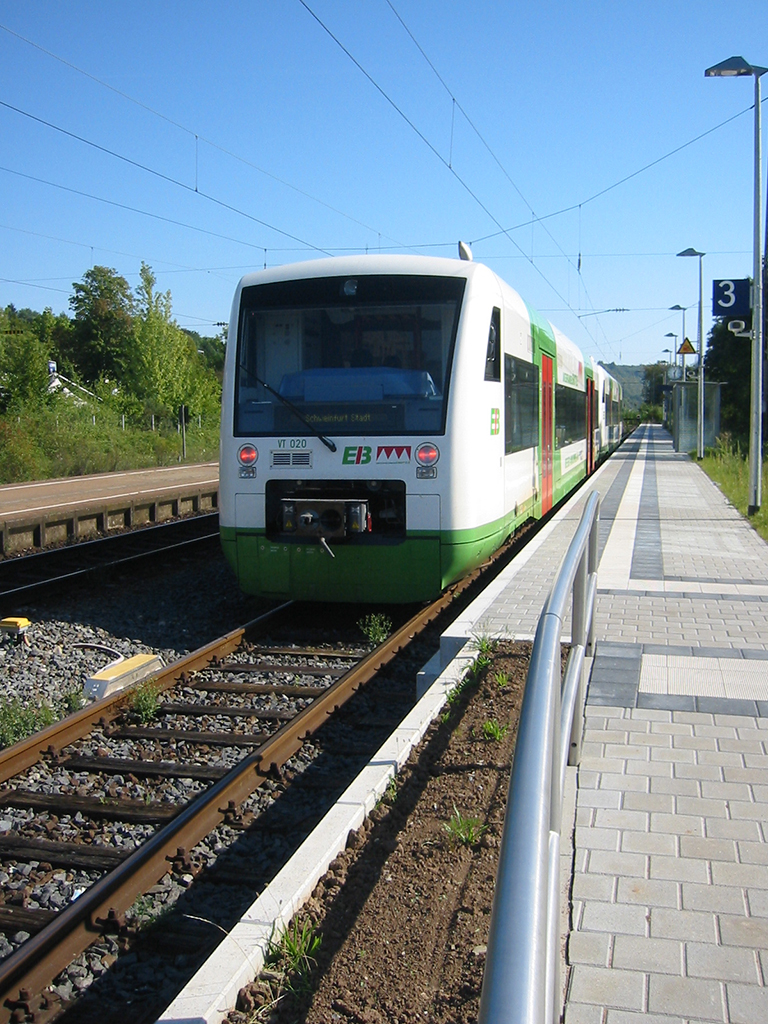
- A Regio-Shuttle of the Erfurter Bahn in Schweinfurt Stadt station

General information
- Location: Schweinfurt, Bavaria; Germany
- Coordinates: 50°2′46″N 10°14′35″E
- Owner: DB Netz
- Operator: DB Station&Service
- Line: Bamberg–Rottendorf railway
- Platforms: 3

Construction
- Architect: Gottfried von Neureuther

Other information
- Station code: 5743
- DS100 code: NSST
- Category: 5
- Fare zone: NVM: B/500
- Website: www.bahnhof.de; stationsdatenbank.de

Services
Preceding station	DB Regio Bayern	Following station
Schweinfurt Mitte towards Würzburg Hbf	RE 20 Limited service	Schonungen One-way operation
Schweinfurt Mitte towards Frankfurt (Main) Hbf	RE 55 Limited service	Schonungen One-way operation
Schweinfurt Mitte towards Schlüchtern	RB 53	Schonungen towards Bamberg
Preceding station		Following station
Terminus	RB 40	Schweinfurt Mitte towards Meiningen
Schweinfurt Mitte towards Gemünden (Main)	RB 50	Terminus
Location
- Location within Bavaria Location within Germany

Schweinfurt Stadt (German for Schweinfurt Town) is a railway station in the Lower Franconian city of Schweinfurt, Germany. It is situated east of the old town, on the Bamberg to Rottendorf line.
