= Dresden–Werdau railway =

Railway line in Saxony, Germany

Dresden Hbf–Werdau wye

Overview
- Line number: 6258; Saxon DW; 6257; Saxon DWCh
- Locale: Saxony, Germany
- Termini: Dresden Hbf; Werdau wye

Service
- Route number: 510, 510.3

Technical
- Line length: 136.304 km (84.695 mi)
- Number of tracks: 2
- Track gauge: 1,435 mm (4 ft 8 1/2 in) standard gauge
- Minimum radius: 213 m (699 ft)
- Electrification: 15 kV/16.7 Hz AC overhead catenary
- Operating speed: 120 km/h (74.6 mph) (maximum) with tilting: 160 km/h (99.4 mph)
- Maximum incline: 2.6%

Freital Ost junction–Tharandt (freight railway)

Overview
- Line number: 6259
- Locale: Saxony

Technical
- Line length: 8.250 km (5.126 mi)
- Track gauge: 1,435 mm (4 ft 8 1/2 in) standard gauge
- Electrification: 15 kV/16.7 Hz AC overhead catenary
- Operating speed: 70 km/h (43.5 mph) (maximum)

The Dresden–Werdau railway is an electrified, double-track main line in the German state of Saxony. It runs from Dresden via Freiberg, Chemnitz and Zwickau to Werdau wye, where it joins the Leipzig-Hof railway.

The line was opened in several sections and its first section from Werdau to Zwickau was opened 1845, making it one of the oldest railways in Germany. The Dresden–Tharandt section was completed in 1855, the Chemnitz–Zwickau section followed in 1858, the line was extended from Tharandt to Freiberg in 1862 and the section from Chemnitz to Flöha was opened as part of the line to Annaberg in 1866. The entire line was not open until 1869, when the missing section from Freiberg-Flöha was opened. From then on the railway line developed into an important connection. It continues to be an important part of the so-called Saxon-Franconian trunk line (German: Sachsen-Franken-Magistrale) from Dresden to Nuremberg.

== History ==
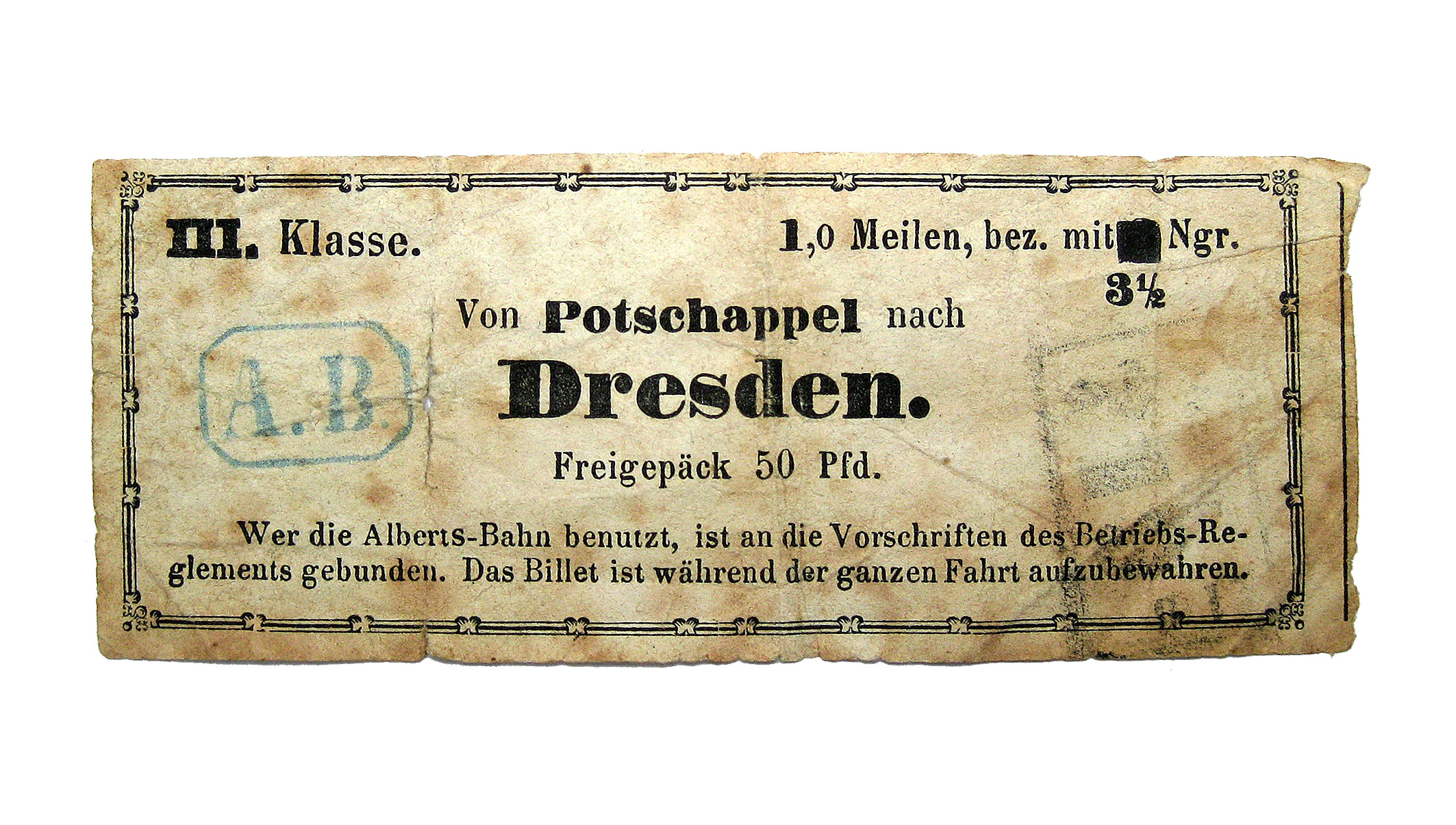
Albertsbahn ticket from about 1855

The modern Dresden–Werdau line developed from a series of originally independent sections that were built with the support of the Saxon government and eventually became part of the Royal Saxon State Railways. The first section opened on 6 September 1845, as a branch from the Saxon-Bavarian Railway at the modern Werdau wye (Werdau Bogendreieck) junction to Zwickau.

The start of planning for a long-distance railway from Dresden towards Bavaria was the request of mine owners in the Plauen Valley (Plauenscher Grund) of the Weißeritz river for a line to connect their coal mines with Dresden. The request was granted and, on 4 May 1853, the easternmost section of the line from Dresden to Tharandt was opened with branch lines to the mines. The line opened on 18 June 1855 as the Albertsbahn (Albert Railway), named after Prince Albert of Saxony.

On 15 November 1858, the Chemnitz–Zwickau section was opened as part of the Riesa–Chemnitz–Zwickau route of the Niedererzgebirgische Staatsbahn (Lower Ore Mountains State Railway).

However, the planned extension from Tharandt to Freiberg turned out to be problematic. At first, the steep slopes between Tharandt and Freiberg were insuperable. Ultimately, a route was selected along the Seerenbach Valley to Klingenberg with a maximum gradient of 1 in 40. Several large viaducts had to be built across the successive valleys of the Colmnitzbach, Bobritzsch and Freiberger Mulde rivers. By the time construction of this line started in 1859, rail engineers had acquired experience with steep haul operations on such inclines as the Schiefe Ebene and the Geislinger Steige. The line was opened to Freiberg on 11 August 1862.

The route of the missing section between Freiberg and Chemnitz was more controversial. A connection through Hainichen had long been favoured. Ultimately, it was decided to build the shorter but more expensive route through Oederan, which had a steep ramp section and required the construction of several large viaducts. Between Flöha and Chemnitz, the line used the route of the Chemnitz–Annaberg railway, which had opened in 1866, and only the installation of a second track was necessary. On 1 April 1869 the Freiberg–Chemnitz section was opened, so that for the first time a connection existed between the eastern and the Western Royal Saxon State Railways in Saxony. As a result, the now completed Dresden–Werdau railway became an important rail link between Silesia and Southern Germany.

On 19 September 1895, a military train and a passenger train collided at Oederan. Ten people died and six were also injured.

=== Reconstruction of the Chemnitz rail network ===
In the 1880s, the Chemnitz railway node was no longer able to cope with the increase in traffic, especially freight. In spite of major upgrades at various locations (including the expansion of the Altchemnitz station and the construction of the Kappel freight yard), the construction of a marshalling yard became unavoidable. Finally, various projects were selected, which included construction to the south of the existing workshops. At the same time, the Dresden–Werdau railway was moved north of the workshops. Construction began in 1896, and the marshalling yard was opened in 1902.

Around the turn of the century, road traffic in the city of Chemnitz was growing. As the rail traffic also increased, the numerous level crossings became more and more of a problem. A railway attendant with a warning flag and a bell had to walk in front of the train at Dresdner Platz. Therefore, from January 1903 the Chemnitz–Altchemnitz section was lowered and the section between Altchemnitz and Chemnitz coal yard was raised above street level. In addition, the line was rebuilt with four tracks in these sections. The reconstruction was completed at the end of 1909. Since the Chemnitz–Adorf railway was upgraded to two tracks as far as Einsiedel at the same time, six tracks were now located next to each other on the section between Chemnitz Hauptbahnhof and Chemnitz Süd.

Traffic continued to increase after the end of the First World War. Therefore, quadruplication of the Niederwiesa–Chemnitz–Hilbersdorf section was started in 1915 and finally completed in 1924. Since the Hilbersdorf marshalling yard was inadequate, possible solutions were sought. Proposals for another line south or north of the existing main Dresden–Werdau line were not pursued. Instead of a proposal that had gained favour that included a complicated southern detour with three tunnels that were each about 1 km-long, an upgrade of the existing marshalling yard was carried out. Despite this reconstruction, which was completed in 1930, Chemnitz station remained an intractable bottleneck.

=== Elevation of the line between Dresden and Freital ===
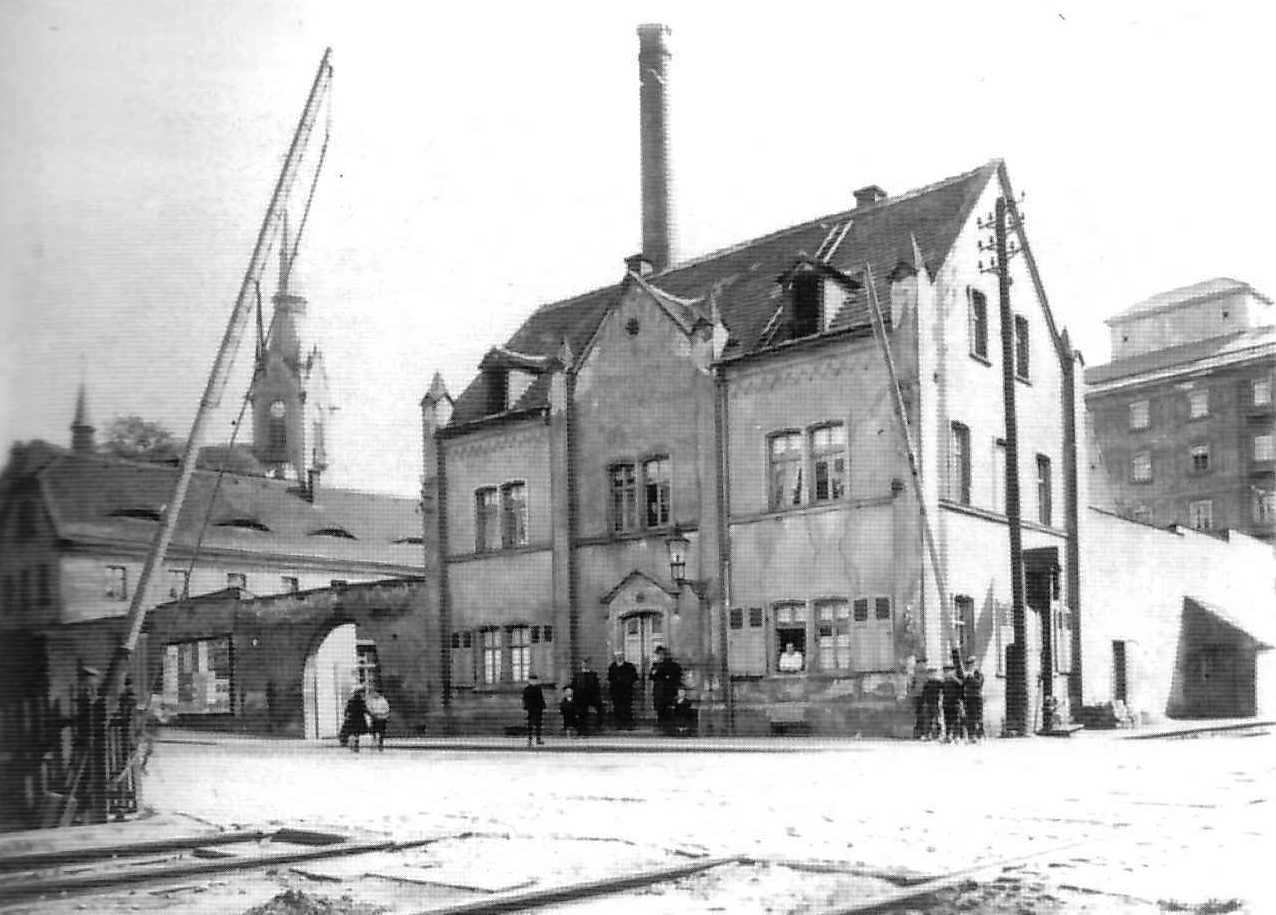
Level crossing at the street of Altplauen around 1910. Dresden-Plauen S-Bahn station is now in the same place on a bridge.

In 1900, the situation on the Dresden–Freital section was similar to that in Chemnitz; the growing road and rail traffic caused more and more problems. Therefore, from 1901 to 1905, the railway was also raised higher, in order to eliminate the level crossings. Around 1910, the tracks on the Dresden Hbf–Dresden-Plauen section and from 1909 to 1912 on the Freital Ost junction–Tharandt section were quadrupled. At the same time, the station facilities were rebuilt. From then on the freight traffic could be separated from the passenger traffic. Because of the First World War, work on a 3 km-long section in between was not carried out beyond preparatory work. The elevation of the tracks took place between 1923 and 1926 on the section between the Dresden-Altstadt exit and Weißeritzbrücke in the vicinity of old Dresden-Plauen station. The old Dresden-Plauen station was closed and replaced by a new building at its current site.

=== Upgrade of the Zwickau railway lines ===
In Zwickau, the railway network was also not longer able to cope with traffic by around 1910 as traffic had risen sharply since the 1880s, but the rail infrastructure had hardly changed. At that time, the largest railway freight yard in Saxony had to be fundamentally rebuilt. At the same time, the tracks were to be elevated, as in Chemnitz and Dresden, so as not to obstruct road traffic. This work was delayed by the First World War and actual construction only began after the end of the war. However, this work went very slowly, so the elevation of the lines between Zwickau Pölbitz and Zwickau Hauptbahnhof took place between 1921 and 1925. 11 level crossings were replaced completely. For the most part, the reconstruction works, during which the Hauptbahnhof received a new entrance building, were not completed until the end of the 1930s. Further construction began during the Second World War, but it could not be finished due to personnel and material shortages.

=== After the Second World War ===
While large sections of the railway largely survived World War II, numerous railway installations were severely damaged or completely destroyed, especially in the Dresden, Chemnitz and Zwickau areas. In contrast to other lines, however, no major bridges were blown up by the Wehrmacht. However, in 1946, the line was completely dismantled down to one track and numerous platform tracks were dismantled as war reparations. As the ability of the important line to handle traffic was considerably reduced, the second track was restored on some sections in Dresden and Chemnitz by the early 1950s. The second track was restored on the bulk of the route in the 1960s and 1970s, but it was not until the middle of the 1970s that the second track had been completely re-built. Nevertheless, the line did not achieve the same importance as it did before the Second World War, since the division of Germany after 1945 meant that most traffic now ran in the north–south direction.

=== Electrification ===
After the re-electrification of the network in Central Germany, the electrification of the so-called Sächsisches Dreieck (Saxon triangle: the Dresden–Werdau, Leipzig–Dresden and Leipzig–Zwickau lines) was one of the most important investment projects of Deutsche Reichsbahn. In addition to significant cost savings in railway operations, this also promised a significant reduction in travel times, particularly as the use of bank engines on the steep slopes on the Tharandt-Klingenberg–Colmnitz and Flöha–Oederan sections would no longer be necessary with electric traction.

Construction work for the electric catenary started in the early 1960s. The construction of the facilities between Freiberg and Werdau was relatively unproblematic. However, the electrification between Dresden and Freiberg, especially around Edle Krone, was more difficult because restricted clearances hindered the construction of the catenary. The most important building project in this section was the widening of the Edle Krone tunnel, since the lowering of the tracks was impossible because of bridges connecting directly to the tunnel. Many catenary masts had to be constructed as special constructions with catenary supports over both tracks. The overhead was opened between 1963 and 1966 in sections starting from Werdau:

Opening	Section	km
1 October 1963	(Altenburg–) Werdau–Zwickau	44.7
30 May 1965	Zwickau–Karl-Marx-Stadt Hilbersdorf	52.3
26 September 1965	Karl-Marx-Stadt Hilbersdorf–Freiberg	36.2
25 September 1966	Freiberg–Dresden Hbf	42.6

The possible travel time reductions were put into full effect in the winter 1966/67 timetable. Steam-driven express trains needed a total of 55 minutes between Karl-Marx-Stadt Hbf and Freiberg. After the electrification, the running time was reduced to only 35 minutes. Even more significant reductions in travel time for freight trains resulted from the discontinuation of bank engine operations between Flöha and Oederan. The 1300 tonne Dg 7301 locomotives took 61 minutes on the same section compared with 122 minutes before electrification.

=== Reconstruction between Oederan and Flöha ===
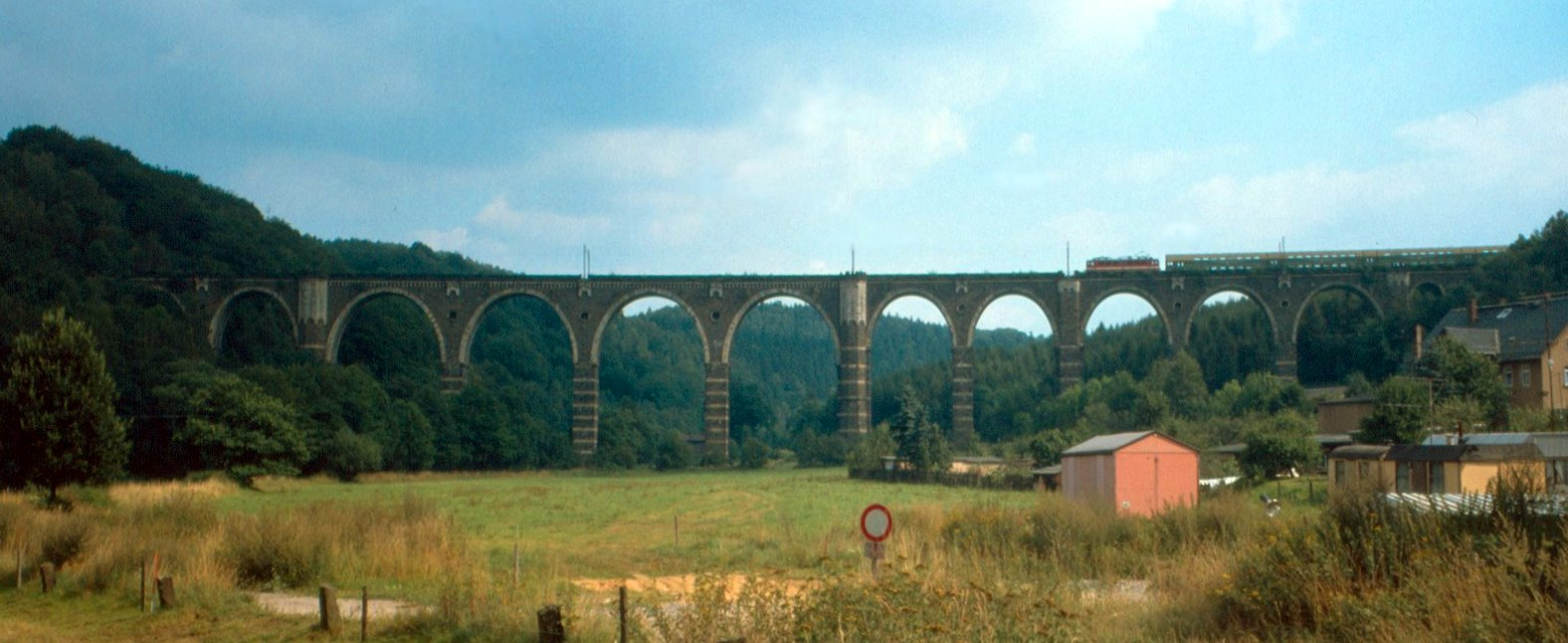
Hetzdorf Viaduct at the beginning of the 1990s

In the mid-1980s, the Hetzdorf Viaduct over the Flöha valley in the distinct of Mittelsachsen, which dated from the opening of that section of the line, had reached the end of its service life. In the final years, crossing the viaduct was only possible at a top speed of 20 km/h, which greatly restricted the section's capacity. Deutsche Reichsbahn eventually designed a straightened route bypassing the old viaduct. The new bridge consists of two prestressed concrete bridges, each 344 metres long, that cross the Hetzbach and Flöha valleys. The construction company VEB Autobahnbaukombinat ("Publicly Owned Operation for motorway construction combine") built the bridges from 1987 onwards using the incremental launch method, for the first time during the construction of a railway bridge in East Germany. The new line was completed and put into operation on 12 May 1992, shortening the connection between Dresden and Chemnitz by about one kilometre.

The new section is 2,033.9 metres long, 966.1 m shorter than the old route. It has grades of up to 1.68%.

=== August 2002 floods ===
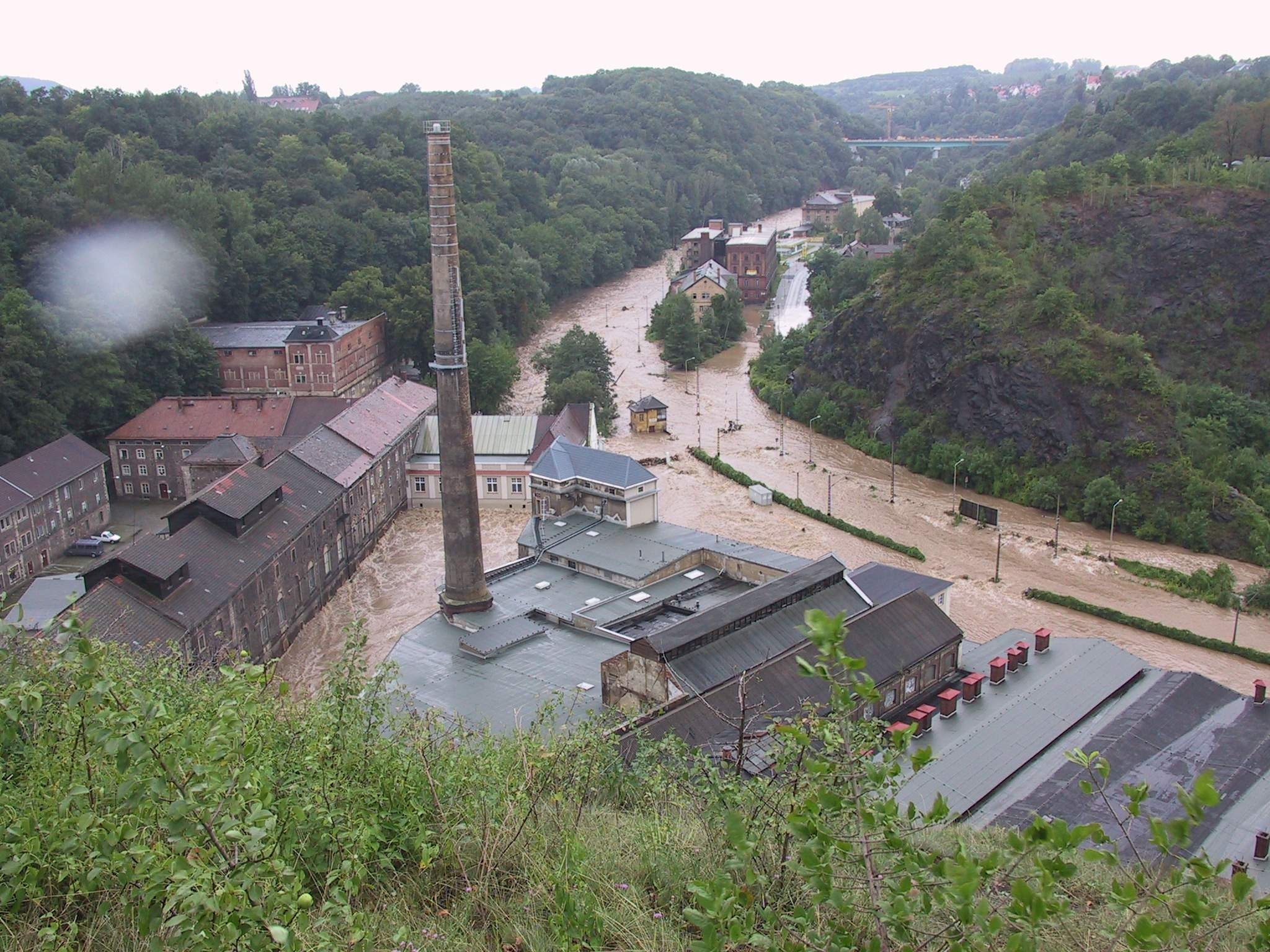
Among other things, near the Felsenkeller Brewery in the Plauenschengrund, flooded by the Weißeritz in the August 2002 and severely damaged.

The about 25 km-long Dresden–Klingenberg-Colmnitz section was heavily damaged by the 2002 floods on 12 August, especially by the Wild Weißeritz and the Weißeritz and more than 15 km of the line was completely destroyed. The section had previously been extensively renovated and was due to be returned to service on 13 August 2002.

Between Klingenberg-Colmnitz and Dresden, rail replacement bus services were established and long-distance traffic on the Chemnitz–Dresden section was only served by replacement buses. From the autumn of 2003, Tharandt station was served again from Freiberg and services on the remainder of the line were restored on 14 December 2003. During the construction work, the need for protection from future floods was taken into account. Among other things, the bridge abutments were built at a right angle to the direction of flow.

=== Upgrades since 2010 ===
The seven kilometre section between Hohenstein-Ernstthal and St. Egidien was upgraded from mid-May 2010 to mid-December 2011. Around €38 million was used from an economic stimulus package and from Deutsche Bahn's own resources.

From the beginning of 2010 to December 2013, the approximately 490 m-long underpass running under Dresdner Platz in Chemnitz that is used by the parallel tracks of the Dresden–Werdau and Chemnitz–Adorf railways, was replaced at a cost of €25 million. During the demolition of the old tracks and the new construction, both road and railways were kept open for traffic.

Deutsche Bahn AG is planning to rebuild three rail overpasses in Plauen from 2016 to 2018 and to rebuild Dresden-Plauen station in a different location. The new station will be barrier-free and have a lift. Concrete plans have not yet been completed.

Deutsche Bahn AG is also planning to modernise the Chemnitzer Bahnbogen ("Chemnitz railway arc"), a 2.8 kilometre-long section of the Dresden–Werdau railway in the city of Chemnitz, probably from 2019 to 2022. The planned measures include, among other things, the reconstruction of Chemnitz Süd station, the relocation of Chemnitz Mitte station to a new station at Stollberger Strasse and the reconstruction of tracks, overhead lines, retaining walls and five railway overbridges. In addition to the Chemnitz Viaduct, the bridges included are the crossings of Augustusburger Straße, Bernsdorfer Straße, Reichenhainer Straße and Stollberger Straße. The railway viaduct in Reichsstraße is being refurbished and refilled. The federal government and Deutsche Bahn AG have set aside a total of around €95 million for these measures. The new construction and the reconstruction are to be carried out with rail operations continuing on a single track. The planning approval procedure was initiated in September 2015. If this can be completed by 2018, construction may start by 2019.

== Route ==
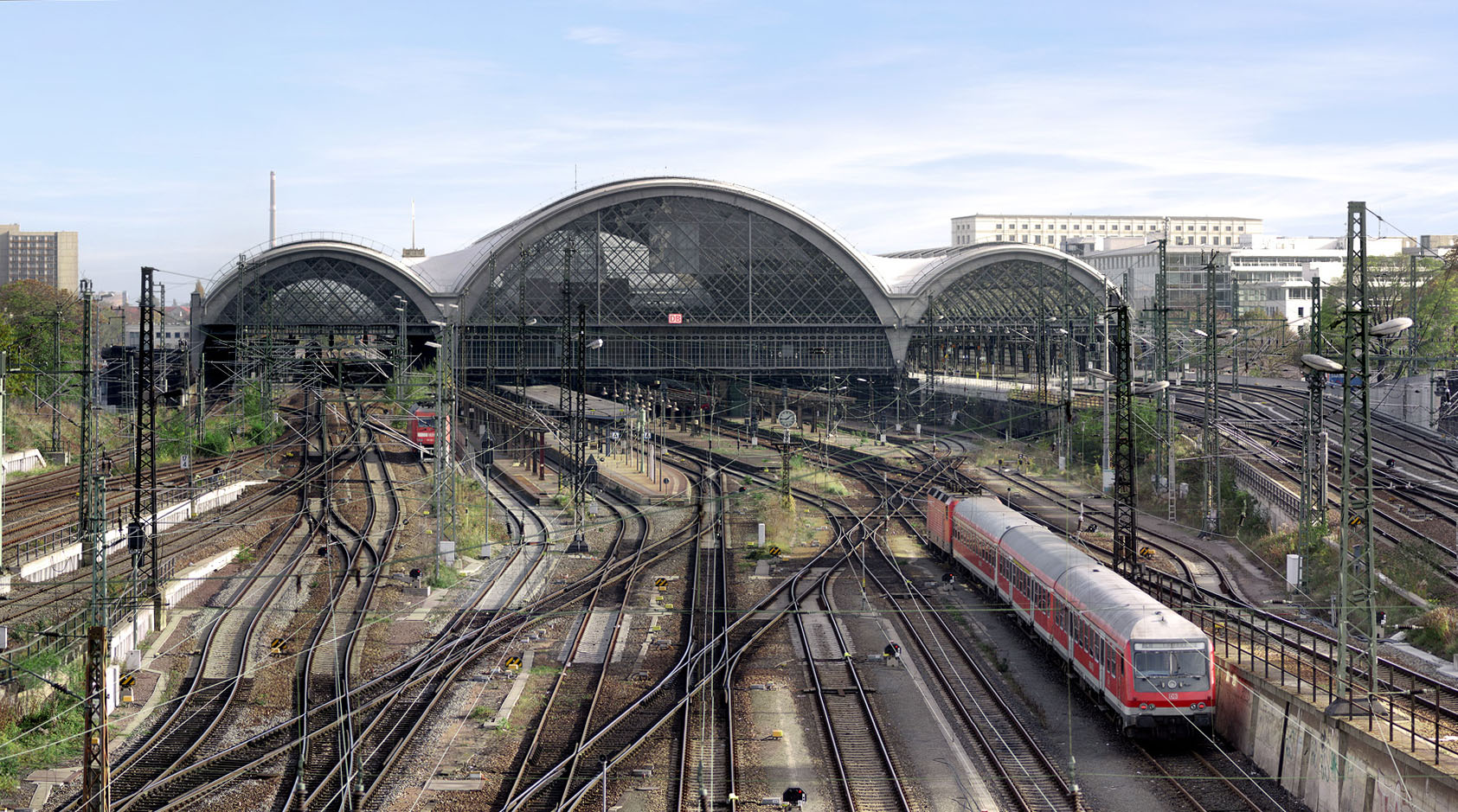
Approach to Dresden Hauptbahnhof

The route leaves Dresden Hauptbahnhof and runs to a triangular junction (where lines branch off to Dresden-Neustadt) and turns south past the rail museum in the former Dresden-Altstadt depot. From Dresden-Plauen station it runs to Freital through the narrow valley of the Weißeritz (known as the Plauenscher Grund) and crosses Autobahn 17. The standard gauge Windberg Railway (Windbergbahn) formerly branched off between Dresden-Plauen and Freital-Potschappel.

Just south of Freital-Hainsberg, where the 750 mm gauge Weisseritz Valley Railway begins, the line passes the confluence of the Weißeritz's tributaries: the Red Weißeritz and the Wild Weißeritz. The line follows the Wild Weißeritz through Tharandt to Edle Krone. To the west lies the Tharandt Forest. The line is used by S-Bahn line S3 as far as Tharandt. Starting in Tharandt the line is extremely steep for a main line, with a slope of 1 in 40, sometimes even 1 in 39. In the age of steam, which lasted until the electrification of the line in the mid 1960s, this ramp could only be climbed by the use of locomotives in multiple. This gradient was necessary to climb the Ore Mountain Foreland (Erzgebirgsvorland). After Edle Krone station, the line runs through a 122-metre-long tunnel. In Klingenberg Colmnitz, the line reaches 435 m above sea level, a rise of 228 metres in 11.6 kilometres. This station was once the starting point of the 750 mm gauge railways of the Wilsdruff Network to Frauenstein and Oberdittmannsdorf.

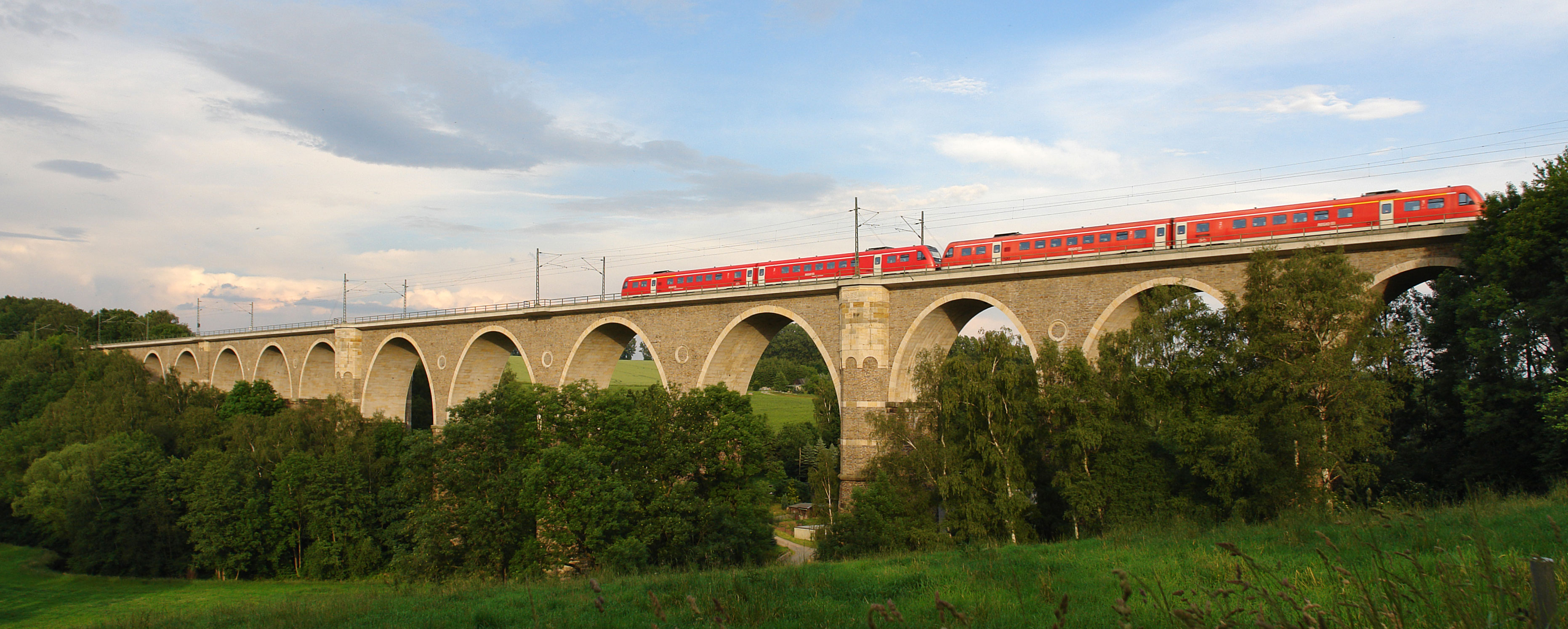
Frankenstein Viaduct, built 1868

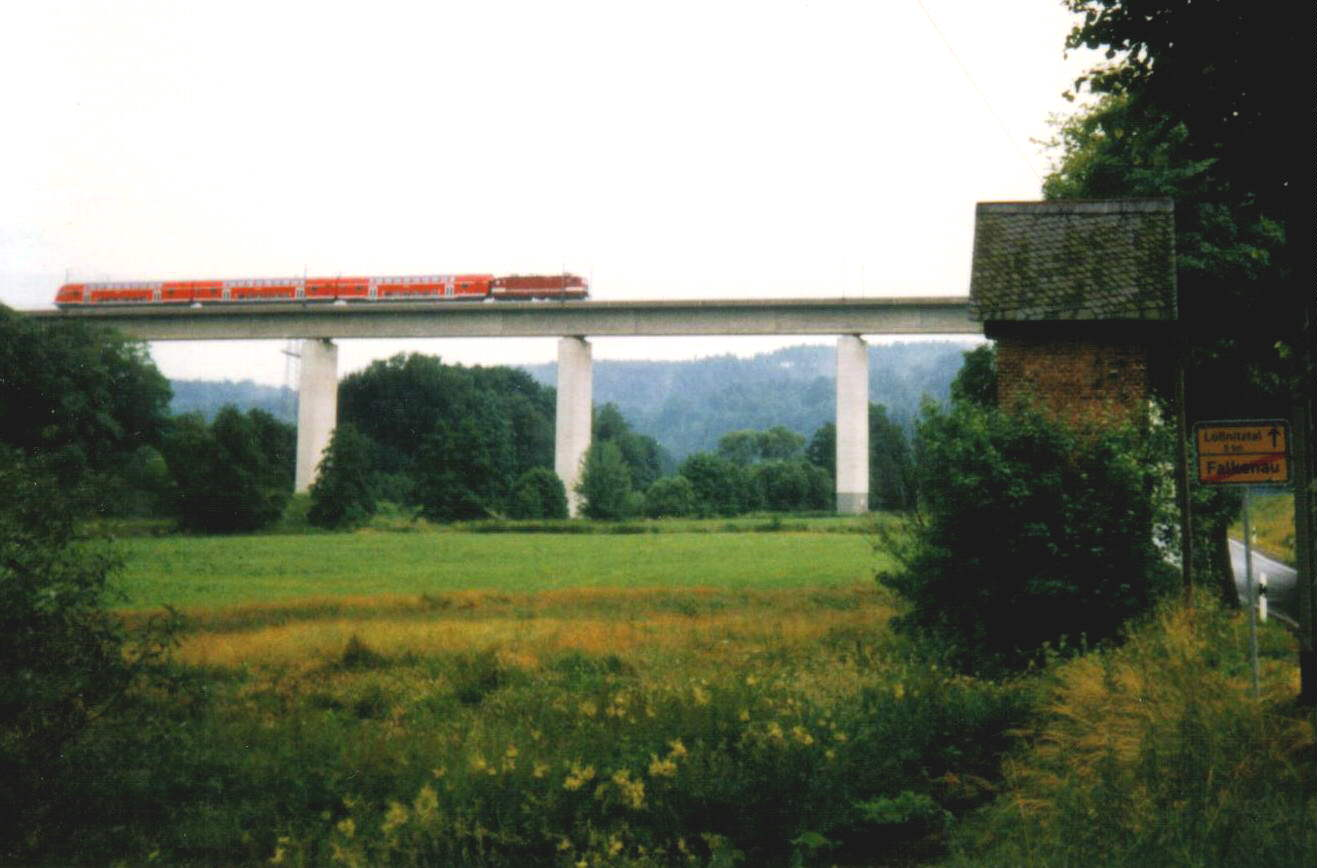
New Hetzdorf Viaduct

Now begins a section with a number of viaducts. The first viaduct spans the Colmnitzbach in Colmnitz. In Niederbobritzsch, a town in the district of Bobritzsch, the line crosses the Bobritzsch river on a 26-metre-high (85 ft) viaduct. After Muldenhütten station, the line crosses the 196 metres-long and 42.8 metres high viaduct over the Freiberger Mulde. At the 40.0 km mark the line reaches Freiberg station. It was formerly a major rail hub, but it is now only the end point for Dresden S-Bahn line S30 peak-hour services and the starting point of the branch line to Holzhau. The line to Holzhau together with the Zellwaldbahn (Zellwald Railway) form the Nossen–Moldava (Moldau) line, which was restored to operation on 5 November 2005. That line branches off to the west of Freiberg station and runs north to Nossen. At this junction, the Dresden–Werdau line passes under federal highway 173 for the first time.

About 1.5 km east of Frankenstein station, in Wegefahrt, the line runs across one of the most impressive railway viaducts of the 19th century, the 348.5-metre-long (1,143 ft) and 39-metre-high (128 ft) Frankenstein viaduct, which crosses the valley of the Striegis. Shortly before Oederan the line passes under highway 173 again. Before Flöha the line connects with the branch line from Marienberg and Olbernhau. Until 1991, the line crossed the Flöha river on the old Hetzdorf Viaduct; it now runs along a new section with two prestressed concrete viaducts. After passing the junction with the Marienberg branch line and another line from Annaberg-Buchholz, the line reaches the town of Flöha and then crosses the Zschopau river. Niederwiesa, the second last stop before Chemnitz Hauptbahnhof for regional trains, is the beginning of a branch line to Hainichen. Chemnitz-Hilbersdorf station used to be the site of an important rail depot and one of the largest marshalling yards in Saxony; it is now closed. After connecting with two lines from the north, the line from Riesa and the line from Leipzig, the Dresden–Werdau line reaches Chemnitz Hauptbahnhof.

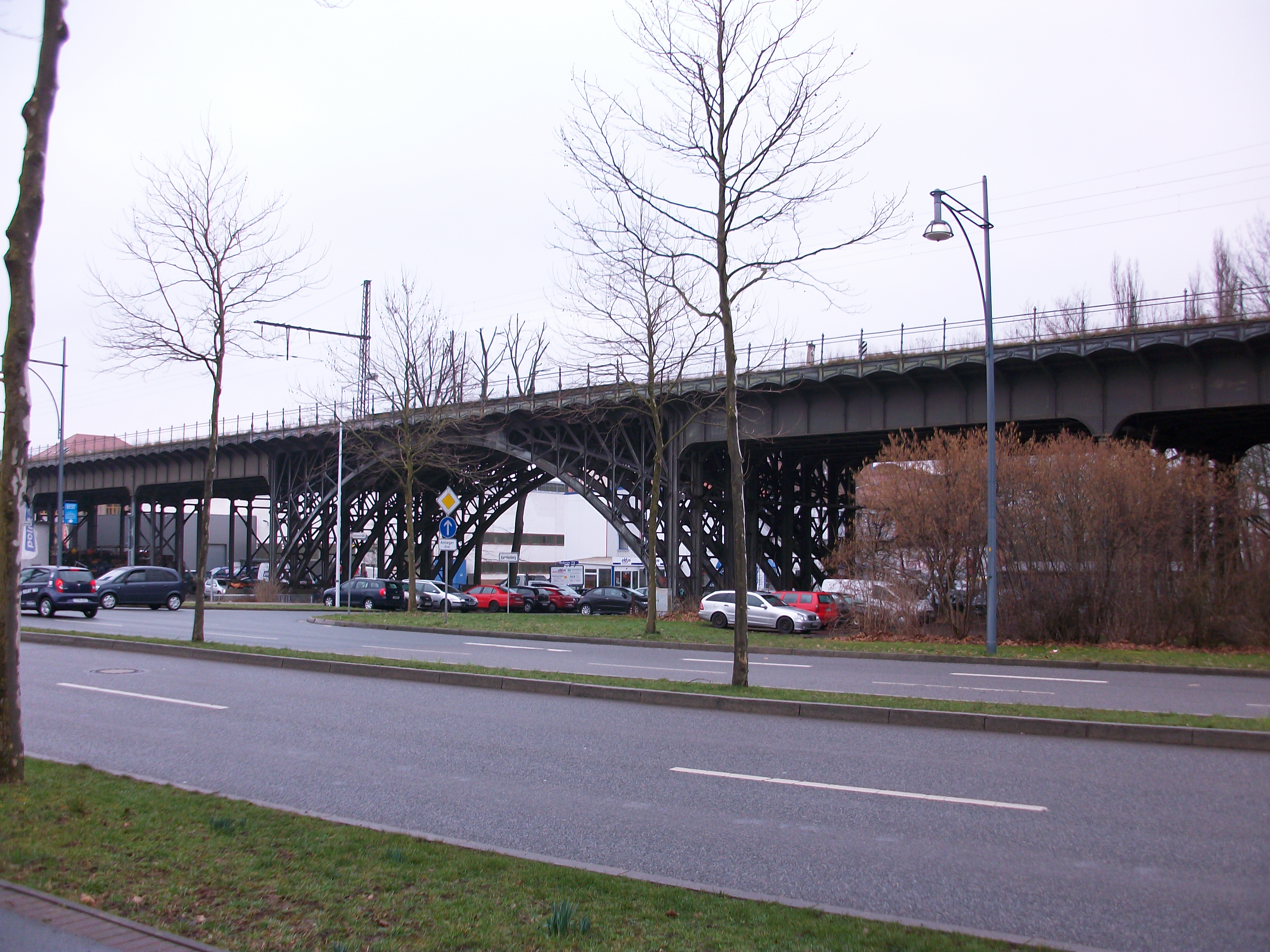
Beckerbrücke Viaduct in Chemnitz (2016)

After the station, the railway line runs along a wide curve south of the city centre as a direct route through the centre was not possible at the time of the construction. At Chemnitz Süd (south), a line branches off to Aue and to Stollberg. The Dresden–Werdau line turns to the west, running through the suburbs of Chemnitz and then starts to leave the wide basin of the Chemnitz river. Before Chemnitz-Siegmar, the line passes under the A 72. During the time of East Germany, the area west of Chemnitz was in the county of Hohenstein-Ernstthal, which was the most densely populated county in that country. Accordingly, the density of stations in the region is unusually high. After Hohenstein-Ernstthal, the line passes under highway B 180 to reach St. Egidien station, where another line to Stollberg starts. At Glauchau, the Glauchau–Wurzen railway (Mulde Valley Railway) used to branch off, but almost all of it is now closed. At the next station, Glauchau-Schönbörnchen, the line to Gößnitz branches off. The line now turns south and follows the course of the Zwickauer Mulde. The line passes through the town of Mosel, which is the location of a Volkswagen factory, and crosses the four-lane federal highway B 93 (and B 175). After 128 km the line finally reaches Zwickau Hauptbahnhof. The line continues past the disused Zwickau marshalling yard for about five km west to Werdau wye (Werdau Bogendreieck) junction, which enables trains leaving Zwickau to run forward in either direction on the Leipzig–Hof railway, that is both to Leipzig via Werdau and to Hof and Nuremberg via Reichenbach. The line ends here, 135.96 km from Dresden.

=== Operating points ===
Dresden Albertbahnhof (51°02′55″N 13°42′55″E)

The line originally started at the Albertbahnhof (Albert station) of the Albertsbahn AG (company). After its nationalisation, the line was integrated into the Dresdner Böhmischen Bahnhof (Dresden Bohemian station, the current main station). Since the spring of 1869, all passenger trains have run from the Bohemian station. From then on, the Albertbahnhof served as a so-called Kohlenbahnhof (coal station) for freight transport only, so that, for example, approximately 500,000 tonnes of coal were handled there annually in around 1900. Gradually, however, the station lost its importance, although in the 1960s, the construction and operation of the Nossenerbrücke cogeneration power station led to a stabilisation of transshipment volumes. After 1990, freight traffic collapsed completely, with the only major transport activity recorded during the construction of the Dresden World Trade Center. All the rail infrastructure has been demolished.

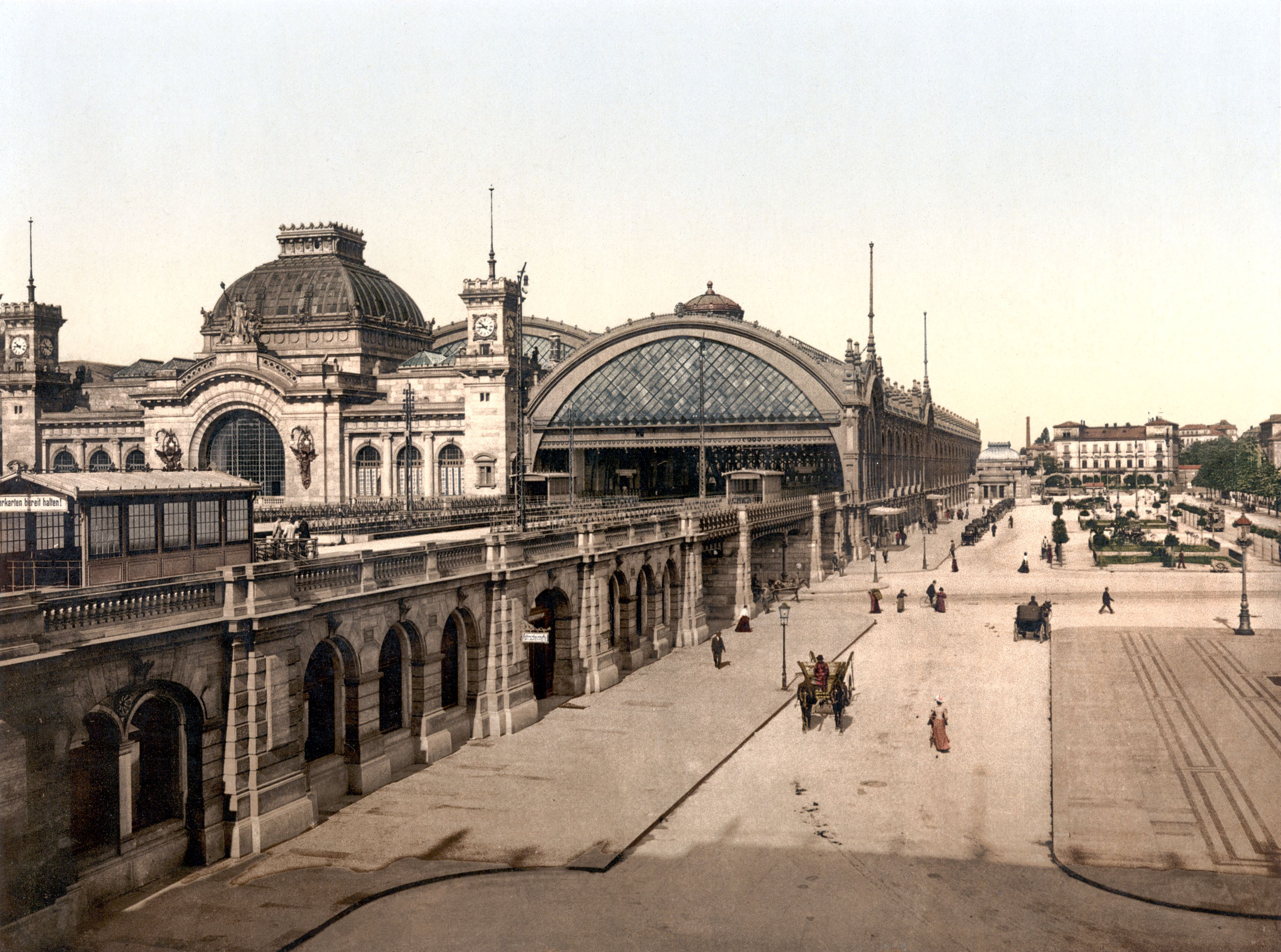
Dresden Hauptbahnhof in about 1900

Dresden Hbf (51°02′25″N 13°43′53″E)

As each of the original railway companies had built its own station in Dresden, there was originally no central station was for the transfer of passengers. Nevertheless, passenger trains running towards Werdau started to run from the Bohemian station in 1869, which became increasingly the city's busiest station. When the railway facilities became completely overloaded in the early 1890s, it was decided to make a major change. In addition to the creation of the Dresden-Friedrichstadt station, the construction of a main station (Hauptbahnhof) was one of the central elements. The new station located on the site of the Bohemian station was opened in 1898. The trains coming from the Werdau direction now terminated on the low level terminal tracks. Plans for additional new construction elsewhere were not implemented either before or after the Second World War.

Dresden-Plauen (51°01′47″N 13°42′12″E)

Plauen bei Dresden ("Plauen near Dresden") halt was opened on 18 June 1855 together with the Albertsbahn (Albert Railway) and was located to the left (south-east) of the railway. In 1897, the so-called Alte Bahnhof ("old station") Plauen was opened with the station building located near the right-hand side of the current tracks. Since the station was located quite poorly for the population of Dresden-Plauen, which had now grown to 12,000 people, a new station was opened about 800 m further north in January 1926 and the old station was closed. This halt, opened in 1926, is to be renovated by the middle of 2018.

Freital-Ost (“Freital east”) junction (51°00′58″N 13°40′27″E)

The Windberg Railway starts at the former Block post of Freital-Ost junction on the Dresden–Werdau railway. From 1912, the line branched off the main line to the right and ran parallel with the freight line to Tharandt and then crossed it at the so-called Höllenmaul ("hell's mouth"). A further railway connection to Freital East-Possendorf railway line station only served freight traffic. In 1946, Deutsche Reichsbahn dismantled both branches as war reparations to the Soviet Union. All the rail operations now took place on track 1, which had originally been built as a separate link to Freital-Potschappel station. The Höllenmaul was filled in 1984 and completely demolished during the upgrade of this section of the Dresden–Werdau railway in 2003. The points at Freital-Ost junction were abolished in 2003.

Freital-Potschappel (51°00′48″N 13°39′41″E)

Of the six Freital stations, Freital-Potschappel station is the most important. The Niederhermsdorfer Kohlezweigbahn ("Niederhermsdorf coal branch railway") branched off here to two coal shafts from 1856 onwards. Its route was used in the construction of the 750 mm gauge Potschappel–Wilsdruff railway opened in 1886. Extensive goods and transhipment facilities were built In Potschappel, which were further expanded during the elevation of the line and its quadruplication after 1900.

In 1913, a narrow-gauge connecting track was established, which was used for freight transport and the exchange of rolling stock with the Weißeritz Valley Railway (Weißeritztalbahn). The narrow-gauge line towards Wilsdruff was shut down in 1972, since which the maintenance of Weißeritz Valley Railway rolling stock has only been carried out in Freital-Potschappel.

Freital-Deuben (50°59′57″N 13°38′47″E

The halt has had three different names during its period of operations:

- until 11 January 1918: Deuben
- until 30 September 1921: Deuben (Bez Dresden)
- since 1 October 1921: Freital-Deuben

The halt was opened in 1855 and is located on the border between the two Freital districts of Deuben and Döhlen. The station had a great importance in commuter traffic until the turn of the century due to the founding of the steelworks in Döhlen, also in 1855, where up to 5,000 people were employed. Today services on line S 3 of the Dresden S-Bahn and Dresden–Zwickau Regionalbahn services stop at the station. When Interregio-Express services ran, they also stopped there. With the abandonment of the use of tilting, stopping at the station was abandoned in order to save time.

Freital-Hainsberg (50°59′20″N 13°38′13″E)

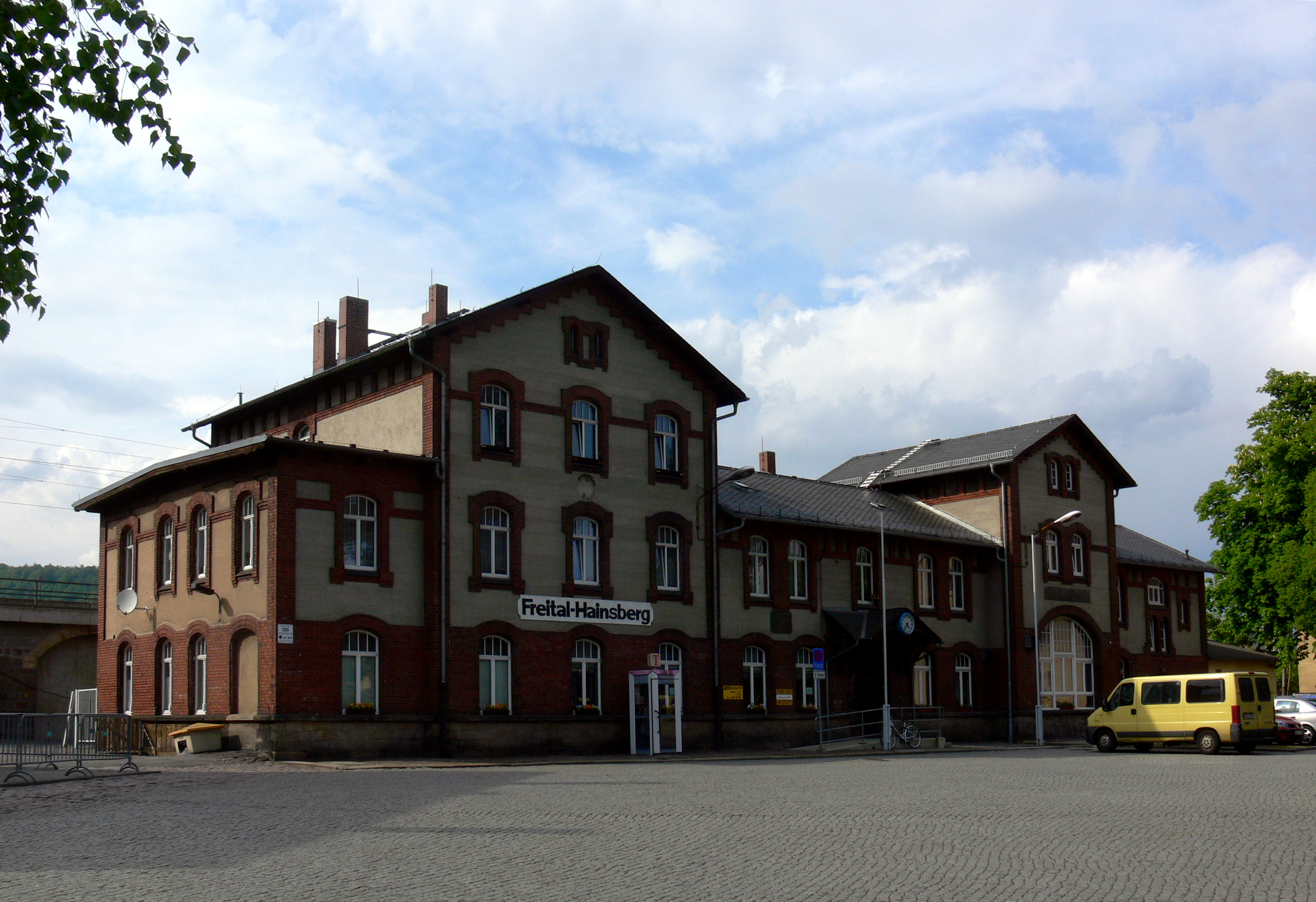
Freital-Hainsberg station

Freital-Hainsberg station has been the terminus of the narrow-gauge Weißeritz Valley Railway since 1 November 1882. Its present appearance dates from its reconstruction in 1903 to 1912 as a transhipment station between the standard and narrow-gauge railways. In addition to the locomotive depot and the former freight transport infrastructure, there are several sidings. The station was opened on 28 June 1855 and was raised to the status of a station on 1 October 1874. The station has had four different names in its history:

- until 12 January 1918: Hainsberg
- until 12 December 1933: Hainsberg (Sa)
- until 29 September 1965: Hainsberg (Sachs)
- since 29 September 1965: Freital-Hainsberg

In Freital-Hainsberg is served by services of the S-Bahn line S3 and Regionalbahn line RB30 between Dresden and Zwickau.

Freital-Hainsberg West (50°58′52″N 13°37′22″E)

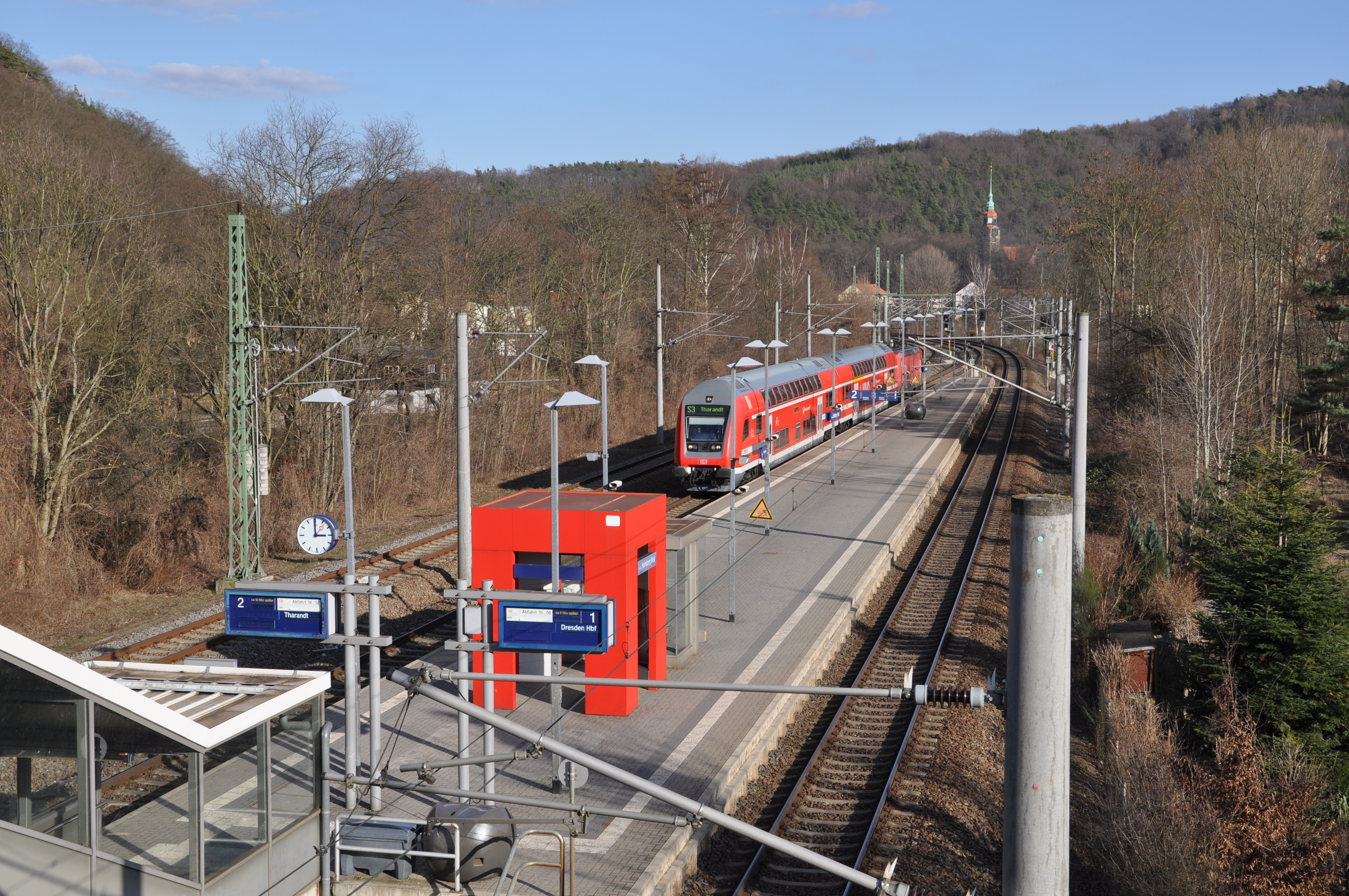
Freital-Hainsberg West station

Freital-Hainsberg West halt was opened on 25 September 1977. It has an island platform and three tracks.

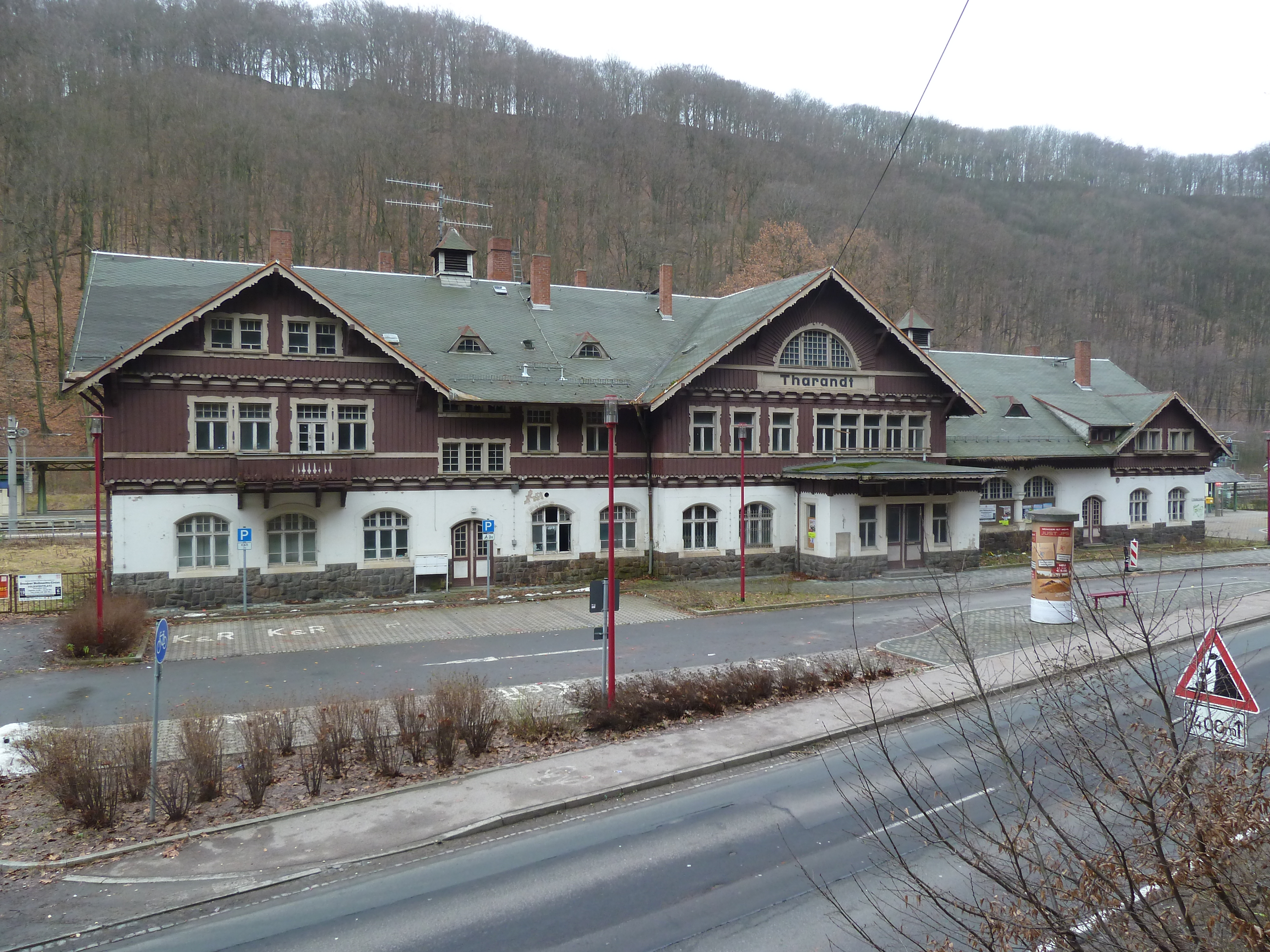
Entrance building of Tharandt station

Tharandt (50°58′59″N 13°35′34″E)

Tharandt station, east of the city of Tharandt, was of great importance until electrification in the 1960s. In order to cope with the steep gradient up to Klingenberg-Colmnitz, most of the trains received an additional bank or pilot locomotive. In freight traffic, this procedure was still practiced until the 1990s.

The locomotive depot for the bank locomotives was superfluous after the electrification and was disbanded in September 1966. Until its demolition in the 1990s, it served as a depot of the Dresden Transport Museum.

Today, most services of line S3 of the Dresden S-Bahn terminate in Tharandt and it is also served by the Franken-Sachsen-Express.

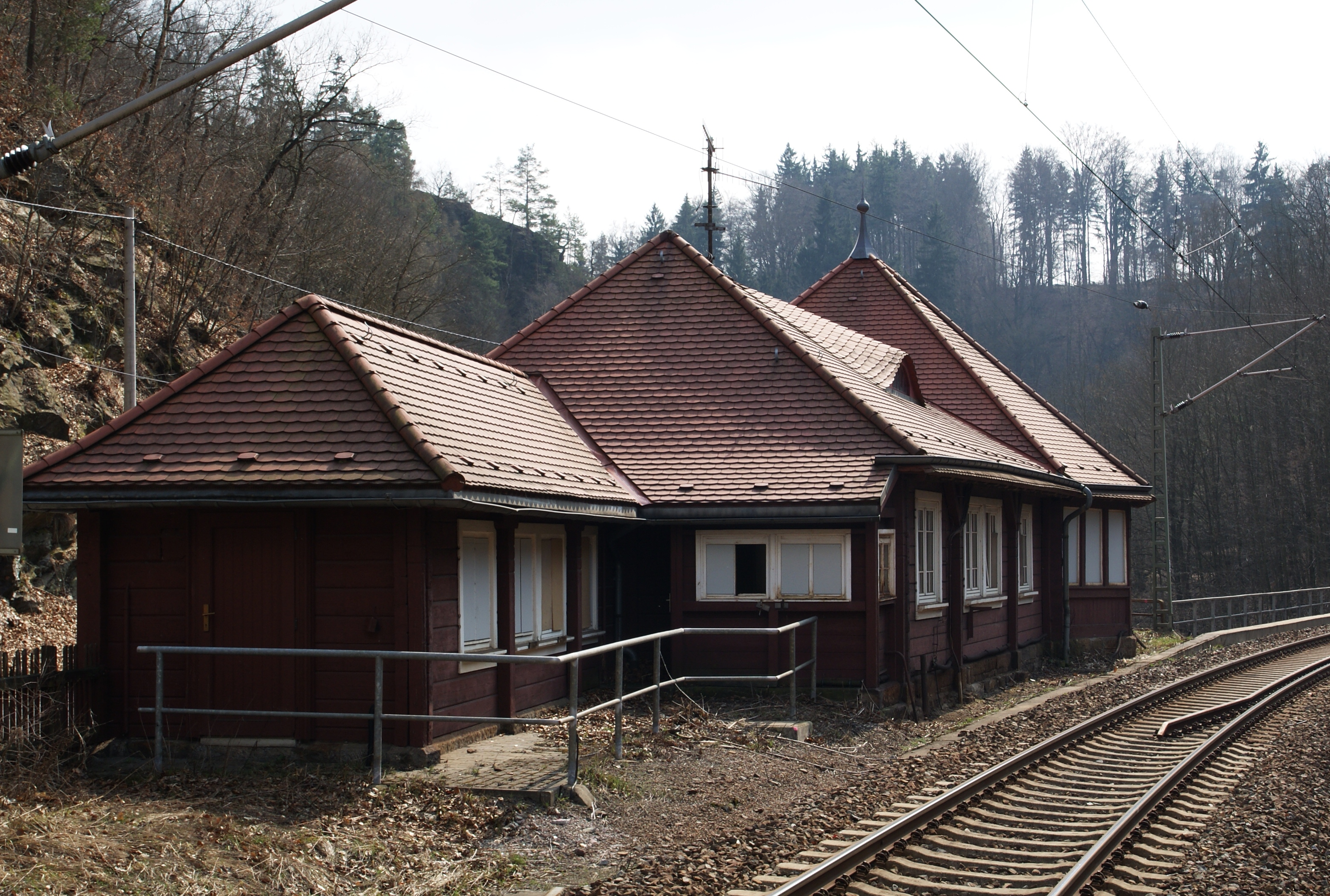
Edle Krone

Edle Krone (50°57′00″N 13°35′01″E)

Edle Krone halt was opened on 11 August 1862 as Haltestelle Höckendorf and renamed Edle Krone in 1871. The station is in the Wild Weißeritz valley on the southeastern edge of the Tharandt Forest (Tharandter Wald) was reclassified as a station on 1 May 1905, but reverted to a halt on 31 July 1999.

Klingenberg-Colmnitz (50°55′33″N 13°30′03″E)

Klingenberg-Colmnitz was the "mountain station" of the Tharandter Steige. From 1898 to 1972, the 750 mm gauge railways to Frauenstein and to Oberdittmannsdorf began in the station.

Niederbobritzsch (50°54′05″N 13°26′26″E)

Niederbobritzsch halt was opened on 11 August 1862 and was reclassified as a station in 1905. Later the station reverted to being a halt. The station building is still preserved at the site. Since 9 December 2007 it is served by the Dresden S-Bahn in the peaks.

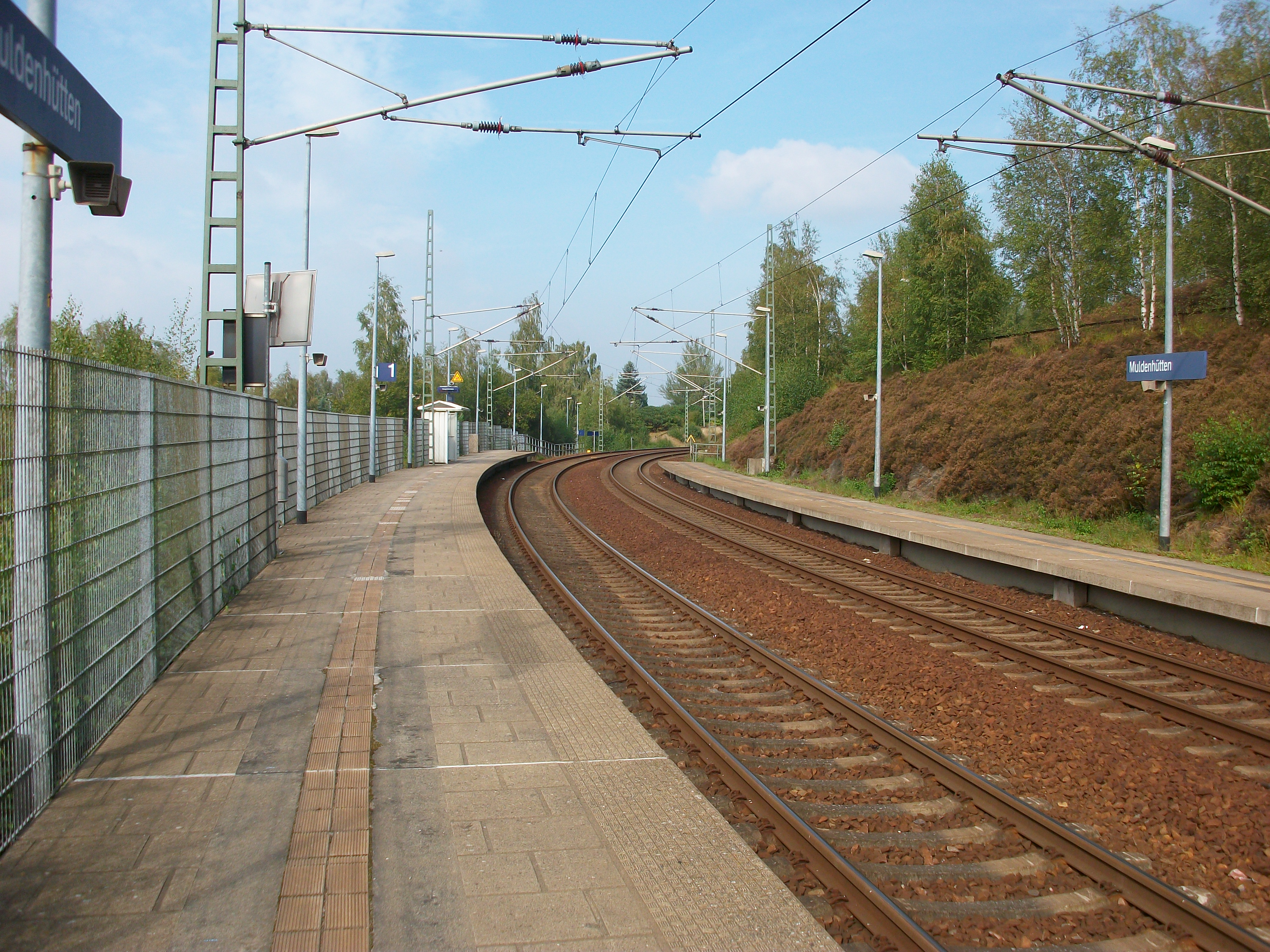
Muldenhütten station (2016)

Muldenhütten (50°54′19″N 13°23′20″E) Muldenhütten station was opened as a halt on 8 December 1861. In 1905 the station was reclassified as a station, but it was downgraded to a halt In 2002. Since 9 December 2007, the station has served by the Dresden S-Bahn in the peaks. In the immediate vicinity is the industrial area of Muldenhütten, the oldest still operating industrial site in Germany. The entrance building was demolished in 2004.

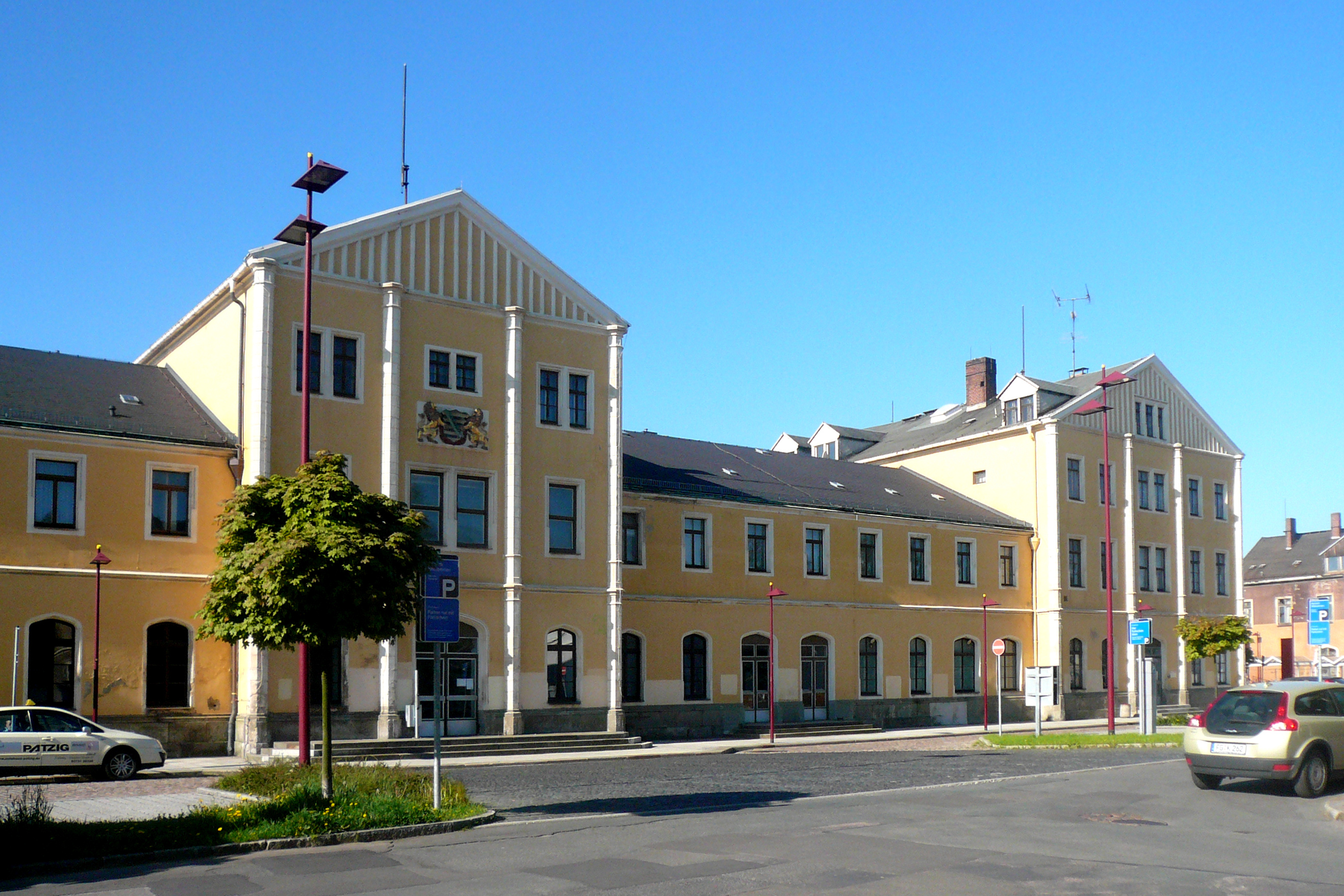
Freiberg (Sachs) station

Freiberg (Sachs) (50°54′29″N 13°20′40″E)

Freiberg station was opened on 11 August 1862 as the terminus of the line from Dresden, which was extended to Chemnitz in 1869. The construction of the Nossen–Moldava railway (1873/1885) and the branch lines to Halsbrücke, Langenau and Großhartmannsdorf (1890) made Freiberg one of the most important railway junctions in Saxony.

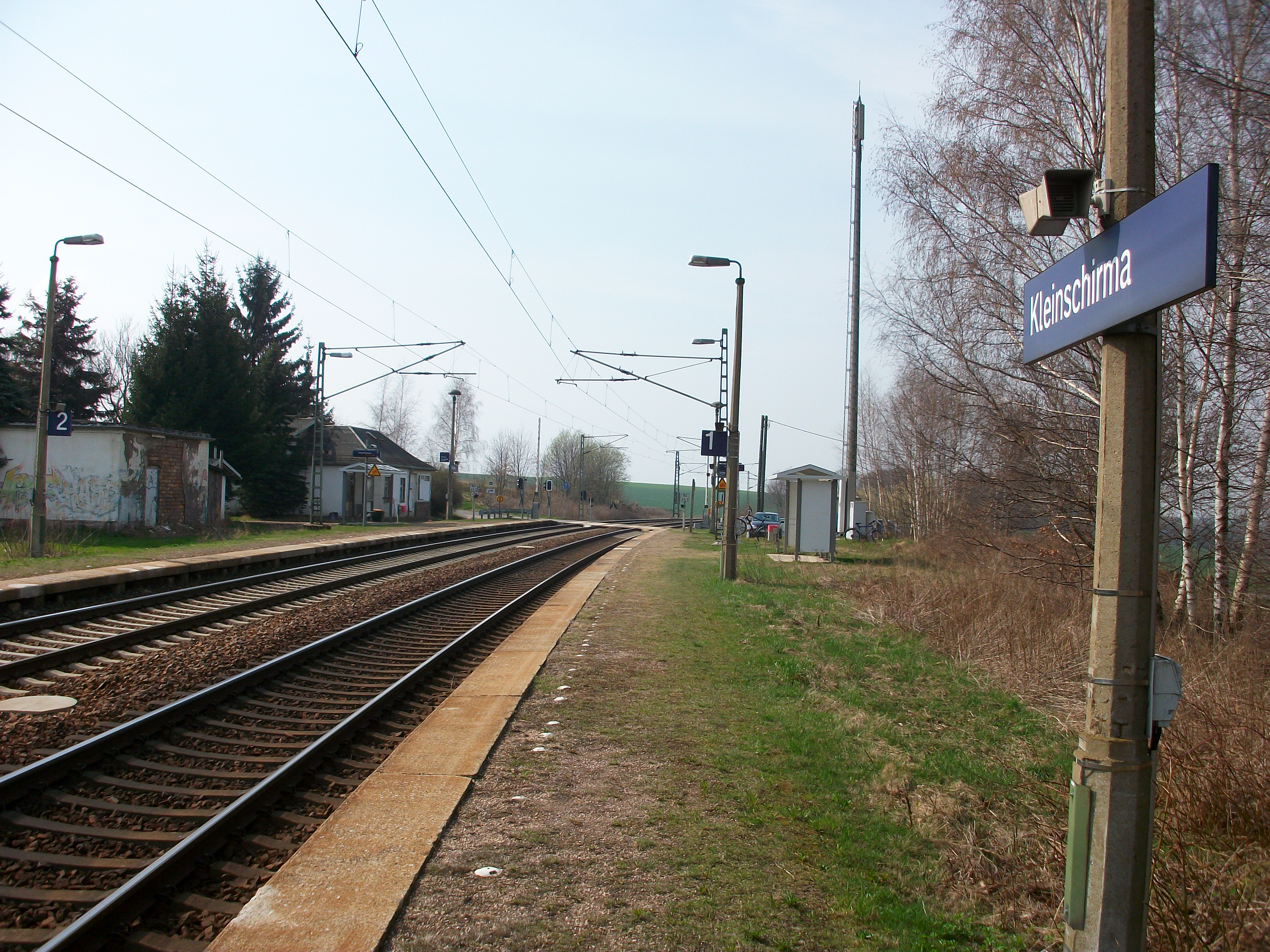
Kleinschirma station (2016)

Kleinschirma (50°54′10″N 13°16′54″E)

Kleinschirma halt was inaugurated on 1 March 1869. It is located in the south-west of the village near federal highway 173.

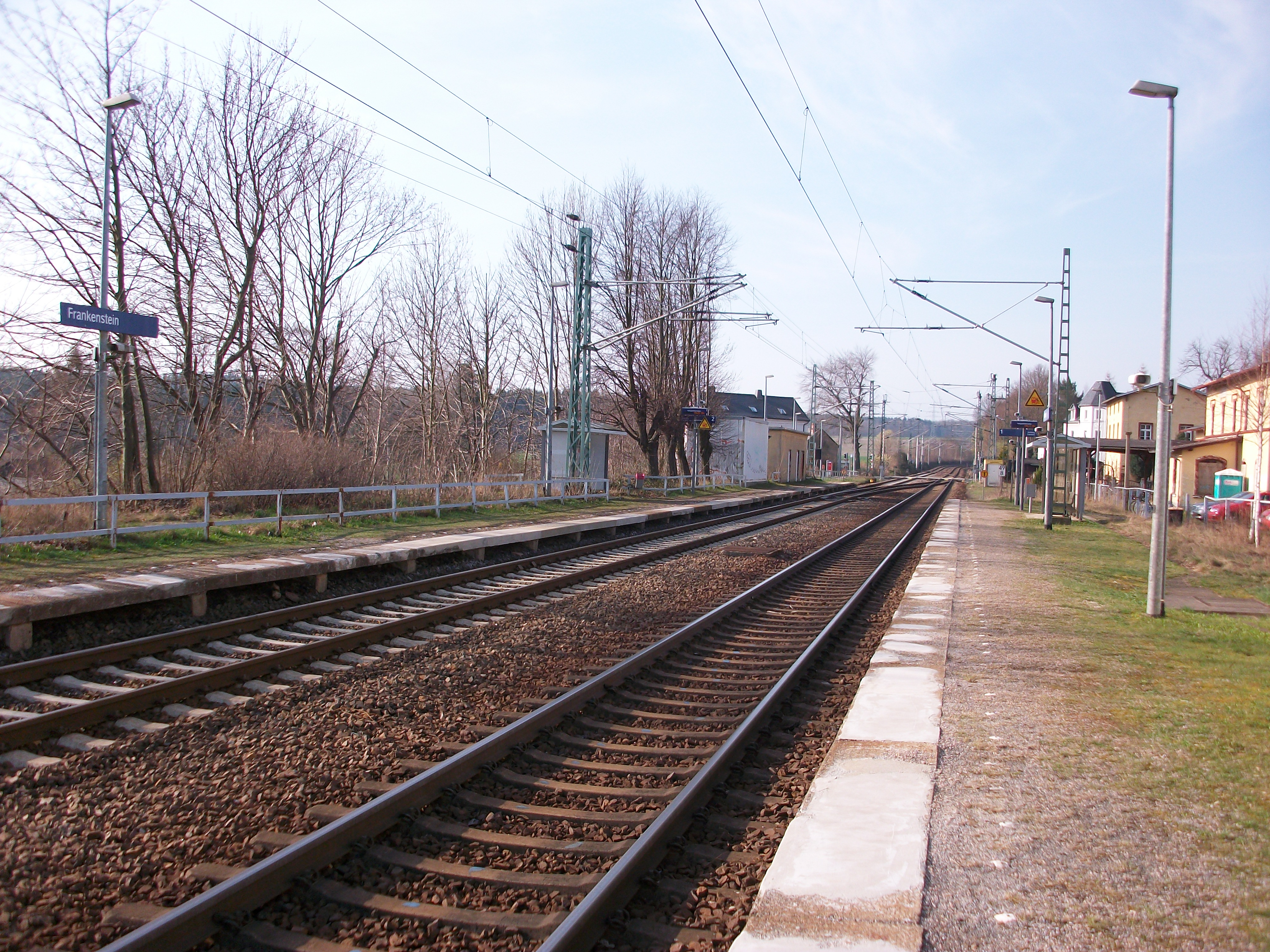
Frankenstein station (2016)

Frankenstein (Sachs) (50°54′09″N 13°13′41″E)

The station has had four different names:

- until 30 April 1903: Frankenstein
- until 30 June 1911: Frankenstein in Sachsen
- until 21 December 1933: Frankenstein (Sa)
- since 22 December 1933: Frankenstein (Sachs)

Although the station lies on the municipality of Oberschöna, the station was named after Frankenstein, which lies about 750 metres away now in the municipality of Oederan. In addition to Oberschöna (about one kilometre away), the station also serves Wegefarth. At first Frankenstein was only a halt, but it was reclassified as a station on 1 May 1905. Although initially located on an open field where the Oberschöna–Frankenstein road crossed the line, several businesses were established in the immediate vicinity of the station. Several railway residences were also built near the station. The locality is now named Bahnhof Frankenstein after the station.

Apart from an entrance building, which was built as a typically Saxon rectangular building, a freight shed was built. There was also a loading ramp and a side loading ramp for freight transport. A private siding branched off within the station. The station tracks have now been dismantled except for the two main tracks and a crossover. Access to the outer platform is now via the road level crossing instead of the former station level crossing.

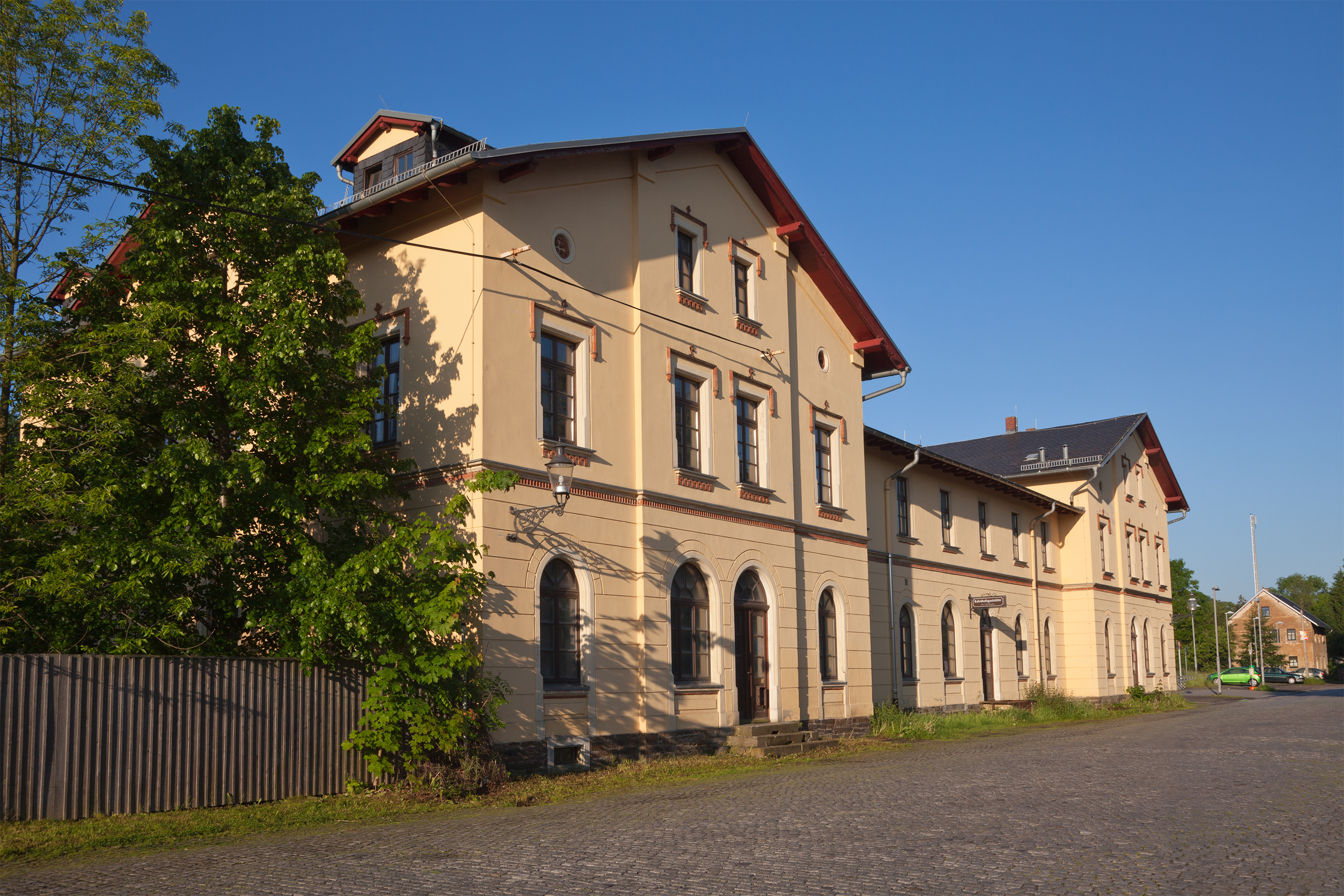
Oederan station

Oederan (50°51′26″N 13°10′34″E)

Oederan station was opened on 1 March 1869. Between 1905 and 1930, the name was spelled "Öderan".

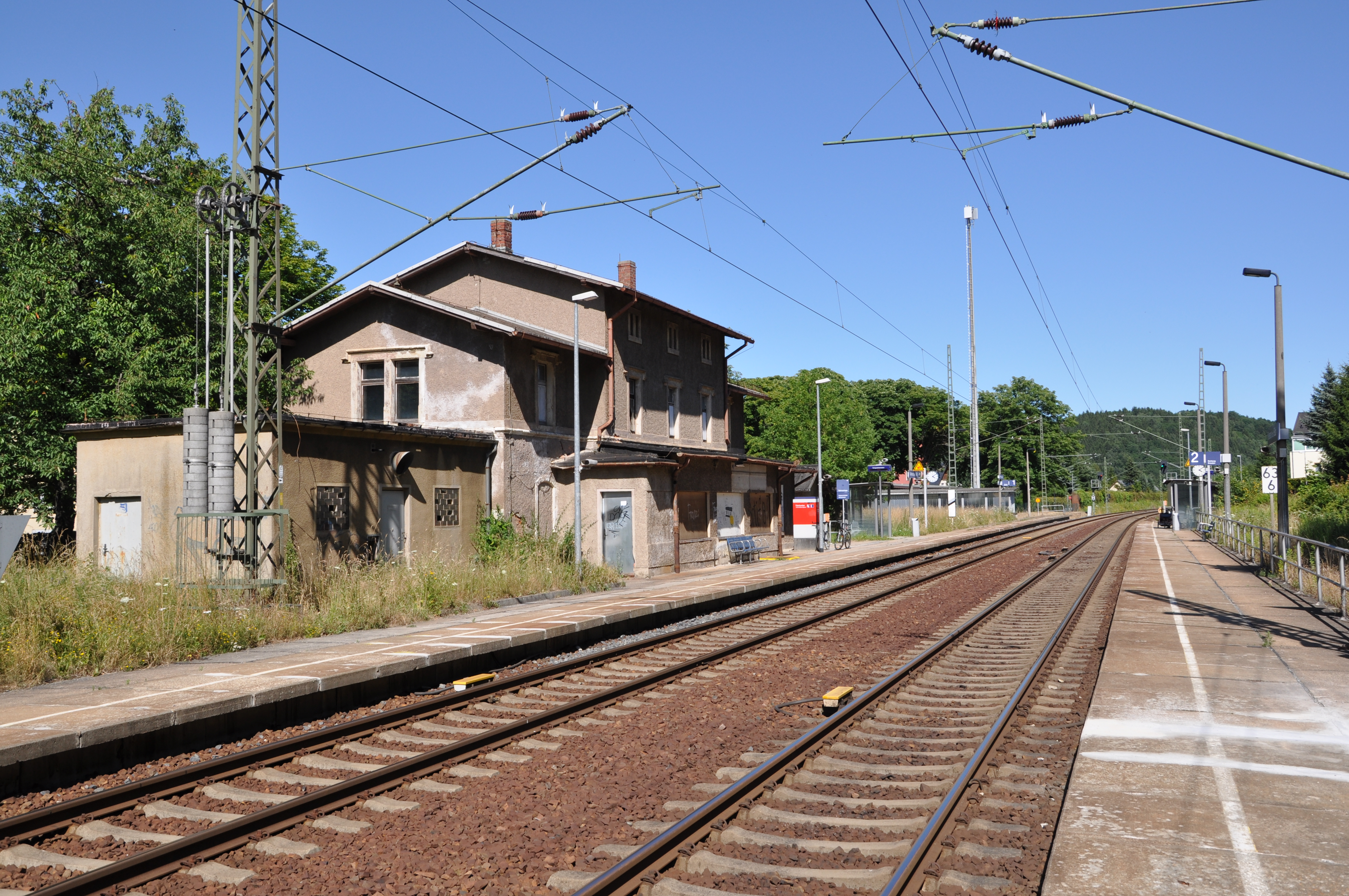
Falkenau (Sachs) Süd station

Falkenau (Sachs) Süd (50°50′57″N 13°06′32″E)

Falkenau (Sachs) Süd halt was opened on 1 March 1869 as Falkenau station. It has had the following names:

- until 1911: Falkenau
- until 1933: Falkenau (Sa)
- until 1966: Falkenau (Sachs)

As the present name suggests, the station is located in the south of the suburb of Flöha, to which it now belongs. Falkenau (Sachs) Hp halt, which opened in 1928, is located on the Reitzenhain–Flöha railway and is located on the northeast edge of Falkenau.

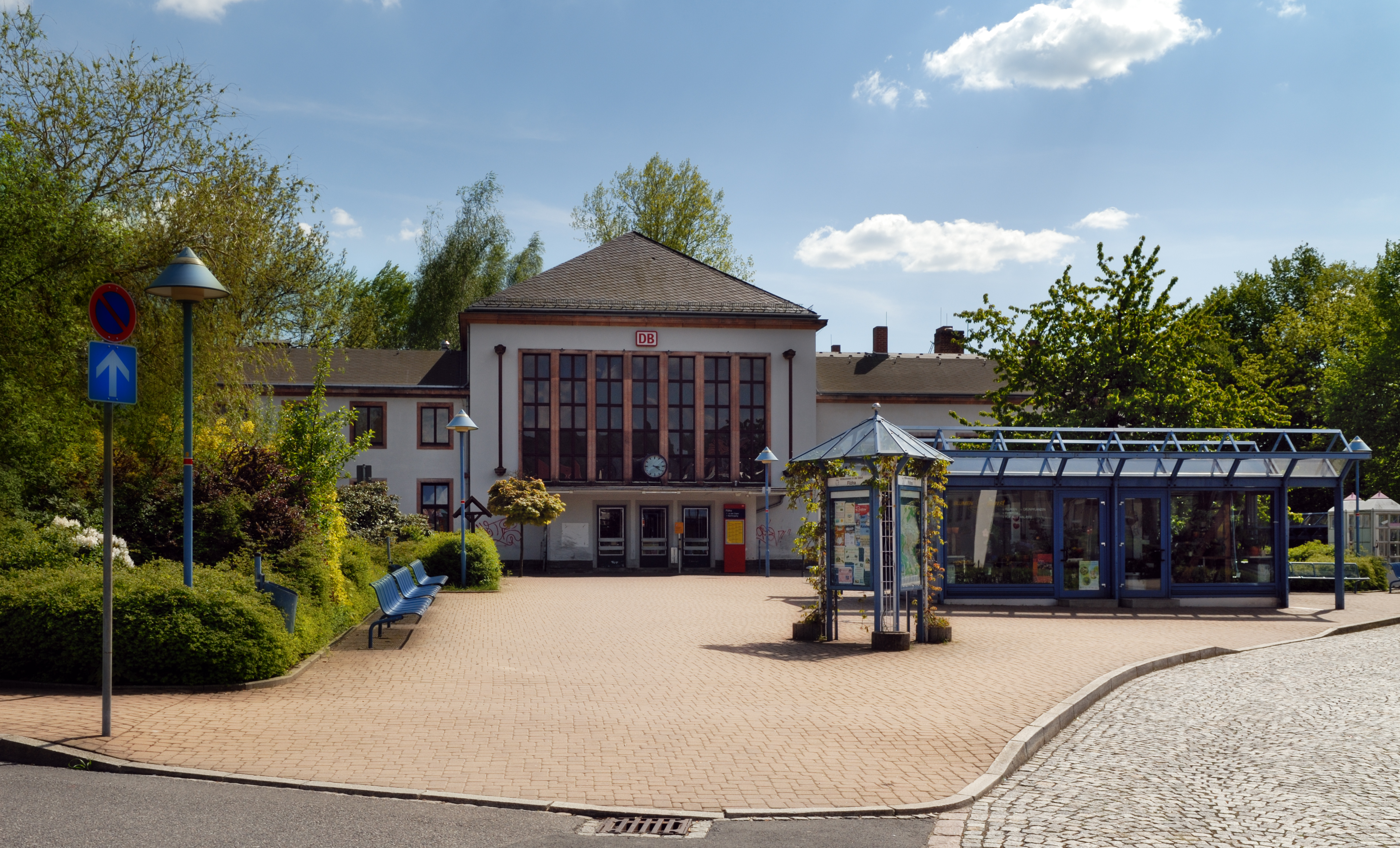
Entrance building of Flöha station, 2008

Flöha (50°51′15″N 13°04′33″E)

At first, Flöha station was only a through station on the Chemnitz–Annaberg railway, opened in 1866. With the building of the Freiberg–Flöha section of the Dresden–Werdau railway, a new station was built to the north-east of the existing station. Since then the entrance building has been a Keilbahnhof ("wedge station"). With the construction of the Reitzenhain–Flöha railway, opened in 1875, another station was built to the northeast by the Chemnitz-Komotauer Eisenbahngesellschaft (Chemnitz-Chomutov Railway Company).

The present stately entrance building was built during a large reconstruction of the station in the 1930s. Although the station has been substantially reconstructed, there are still six platform faces available.

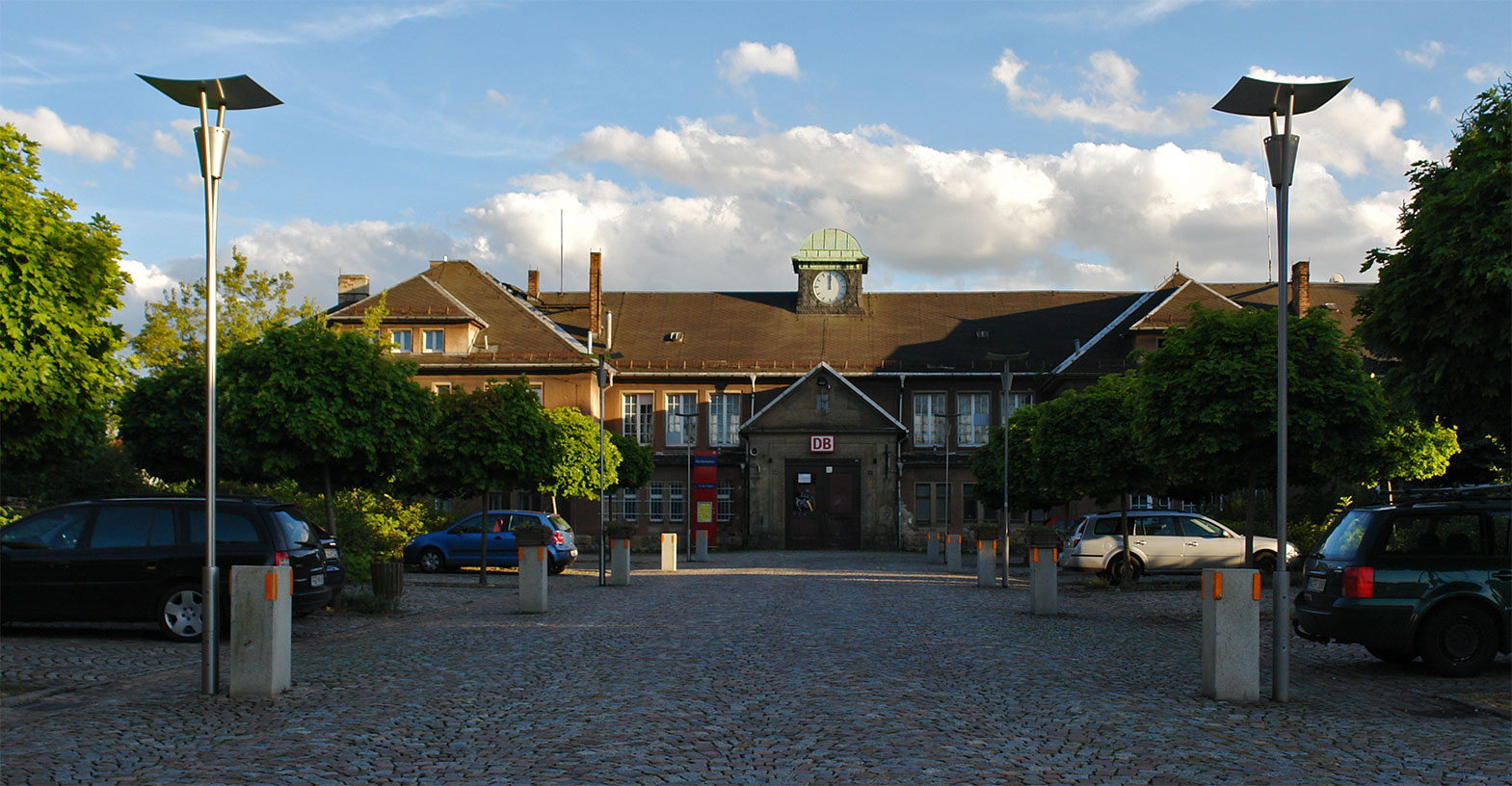
Niederwiesa station

Niederwiesa (50°51′45″N 13°01′24″E)

Niederwiesa station was opened on 14 May 1866. It has been the terminus of the Roßwein–Niederwiesa railway since 1869. Trains have only operated to Hainichen since 1998. Since the modernisation of this line, it has been part of City-Bahn Chemnitz.

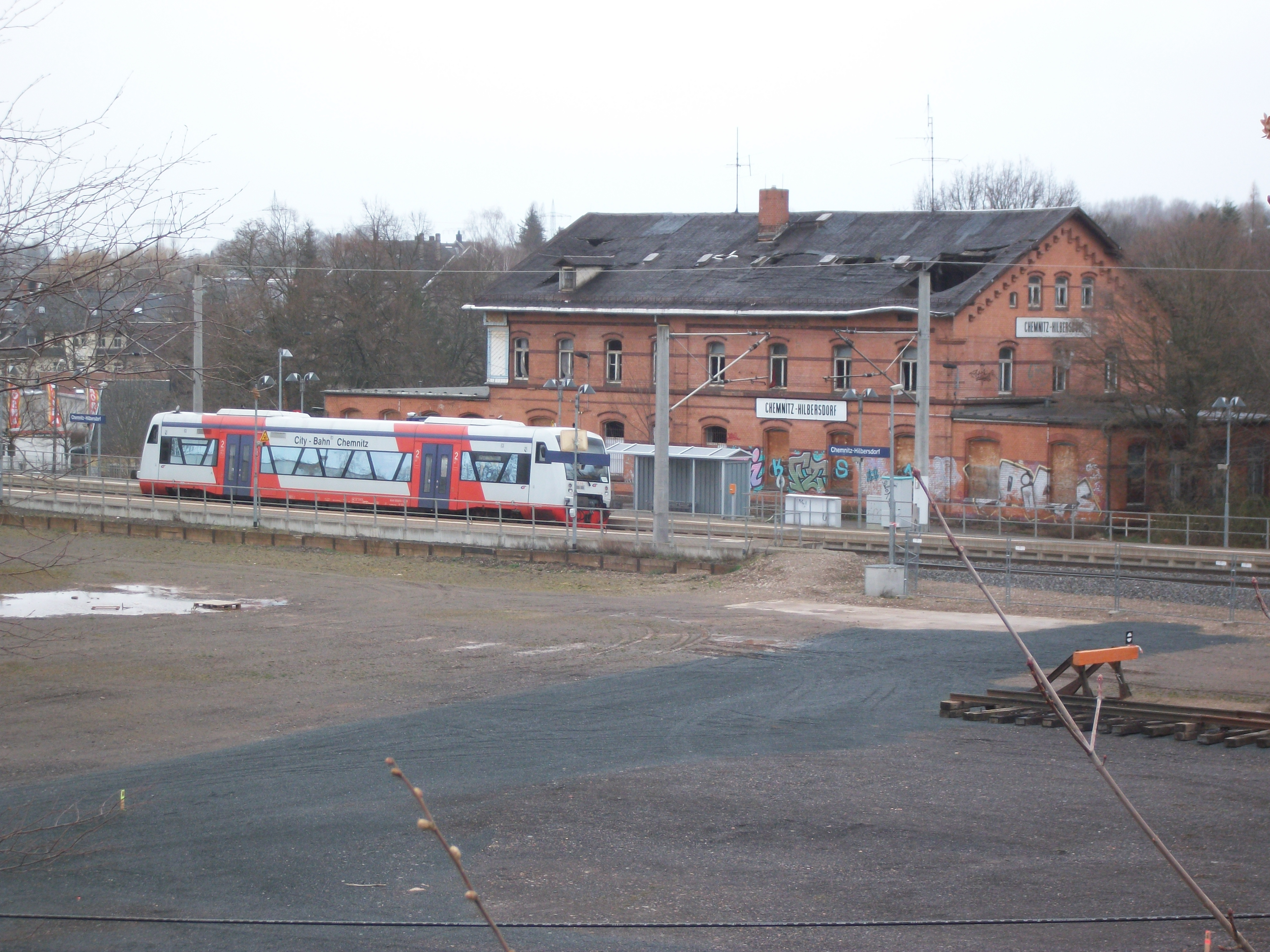
Chemnitz-Hilbersdorf station with City-Bahn service (2016)

Chemnitz-Hilbersdorf Hp (50°51′42″N 12°57′12″E)

Chemnitz-Hilbersdorf was first opened as a "halt point" (Haltepunkt) on 15 August 1893. Already after a short time it was reclassified as "halt place" (Haltestelle). This was upgraded with the construction of the marshalling yard to a station (Bahnhof). At the same time, the station was moved to the present location between Chemnitz-Hilbersdorf and Ebersdorf. The station is now classified as a halt point.

Chemnitz-Hilbersdorf (50°51′40″N 12°57′08″E)

The marshalling yard, which was urgently needed to relieve Chemnitz Hauptbahnhof from freight traffic, was built between 1896 and 1902 at the location of the first Hilbersdorf station. In addition to the marshalling yard, which was designed as a hump yard, extensive locomotive maintenance facilities were built, which later developed into the Bahnbetriebswerk Chemnitz-Hilbersdorf.

Since the capacity of the station in the 1920s was no longer sufficient, it was modernised in the late 1920s. A modern marshalling layout was installed. Thus Hilbersdorf was the second-largest marshalling yard in the railway division of Dresden (Reichsbahndirektion Dresden) after Dresden-Friedrichstadt.

After German reunification in 1989/90, freight traffic almost collapsed. Therefore, large parts of the marshalling yard were abandoned and the yard was completely closed in 1996. The Saxon Railway Museum is now housed in the former locomotive depot.

Chemnitz Hbf (50°50′28″N 12°55′53″E)

Today's Chemnitz Hauptbahnhof was built in 1852 as the terminus of the Riesa-Chemnitz route. With the opening of the Chemnitz-Zwickau (1858), Chemnitz-Annaberg (1866), Borna-Chemnitz and Chemnitz–Adorf (1875) lines, it became one of the most important Saxon railway nodes. In addition to passenger traffic, the station was also important in freight transport, as it was the only station in Chemnitz that handled freight until the end of the 1870s. Since the 1990s, its importance has been greatly diminished by the general drop in traffic, loss of long-distance services and the closure of some lines. Freight is no longer handled at the station. The large Chemnitz Hbf locomotive depot (Bahnbetriebswerk), which was later worked jointly with the Chemnitz-Hilbersdorf locomotive depot, still exists today as the Chemnitz locomotive depot.

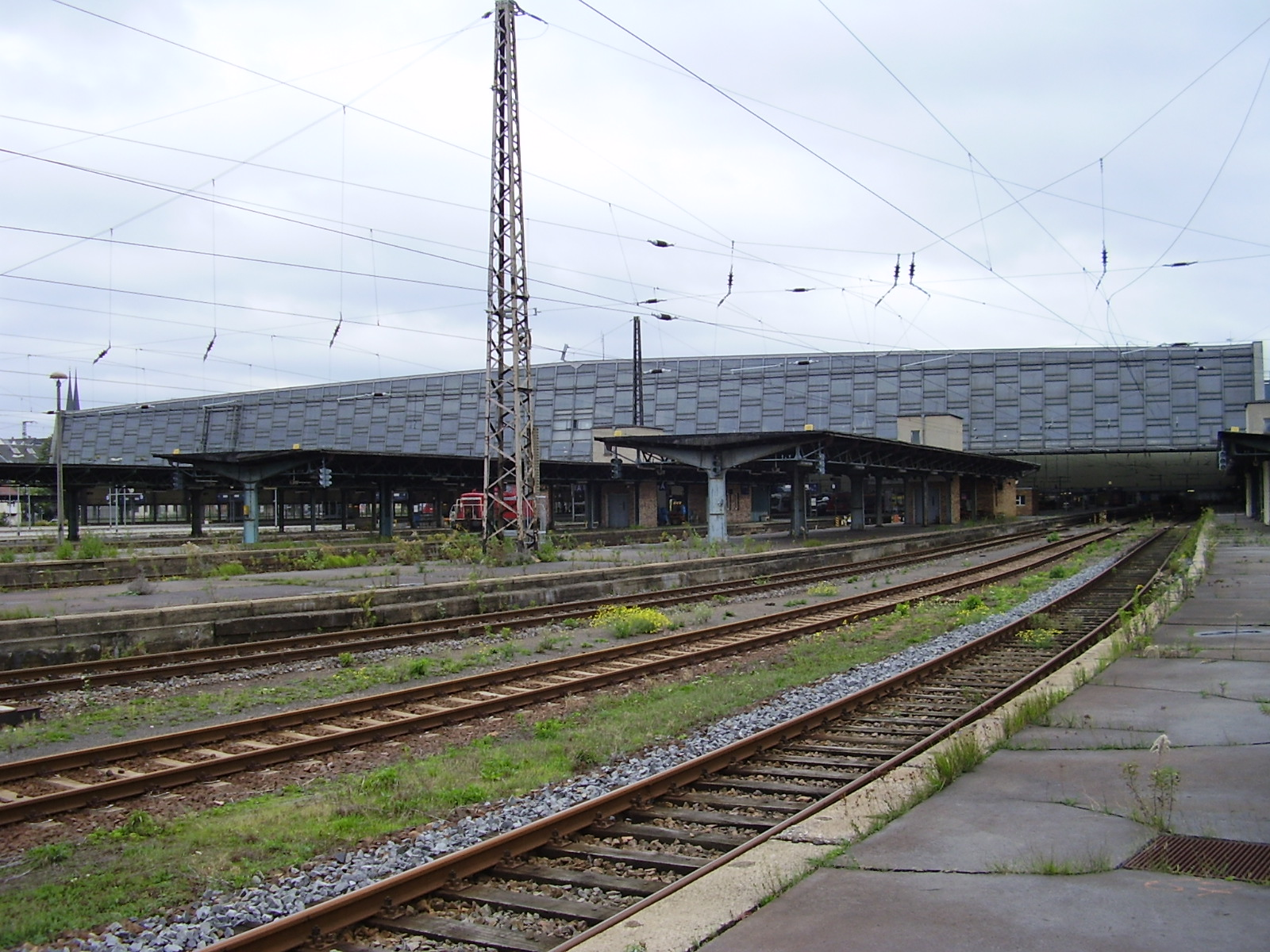
Train shed of Karl-Marx-Stadt Hauptbahnhof in 1976

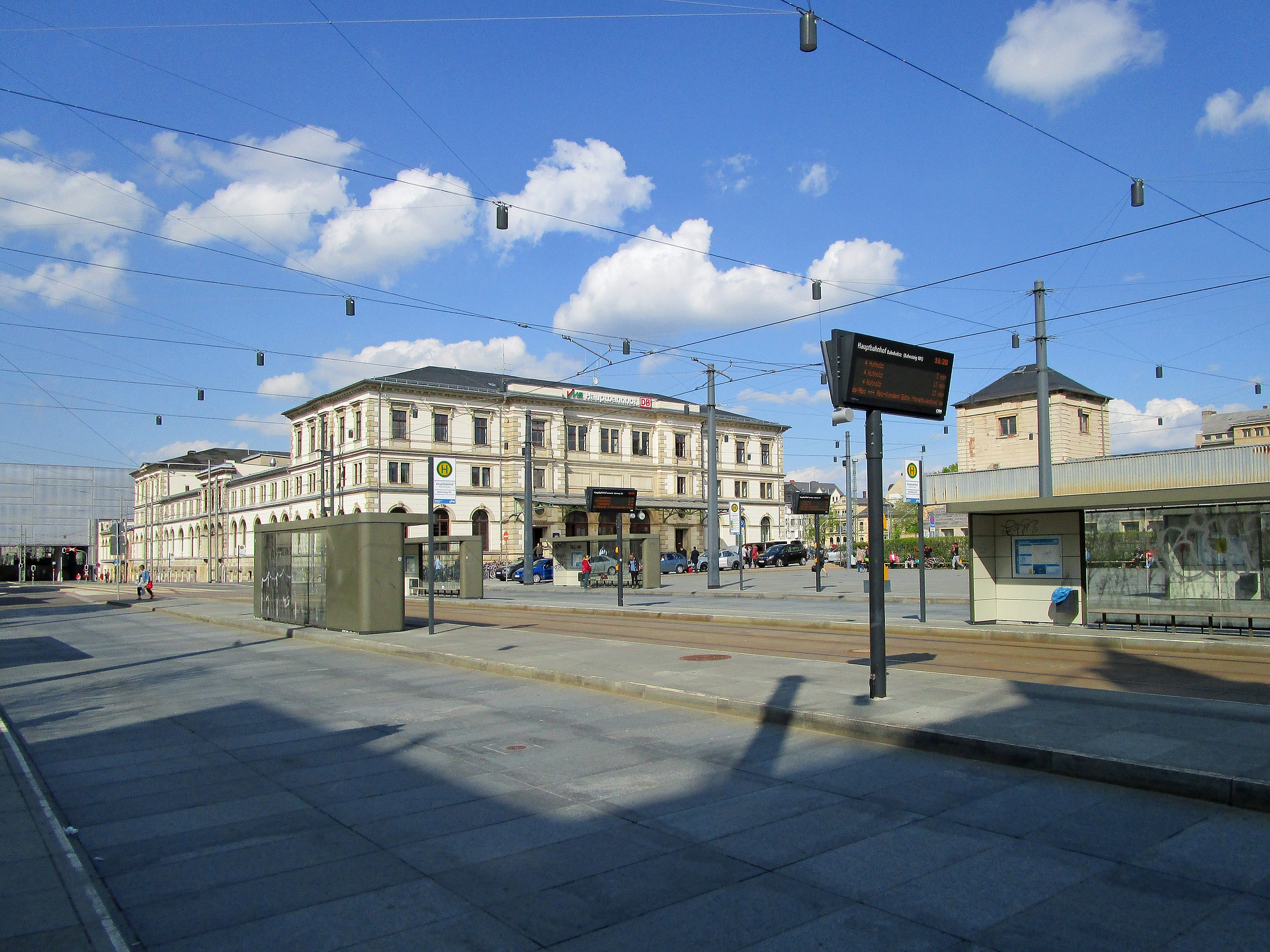
Entrance building and forecourt of Chemnitz Hauptbahnhof (2015)

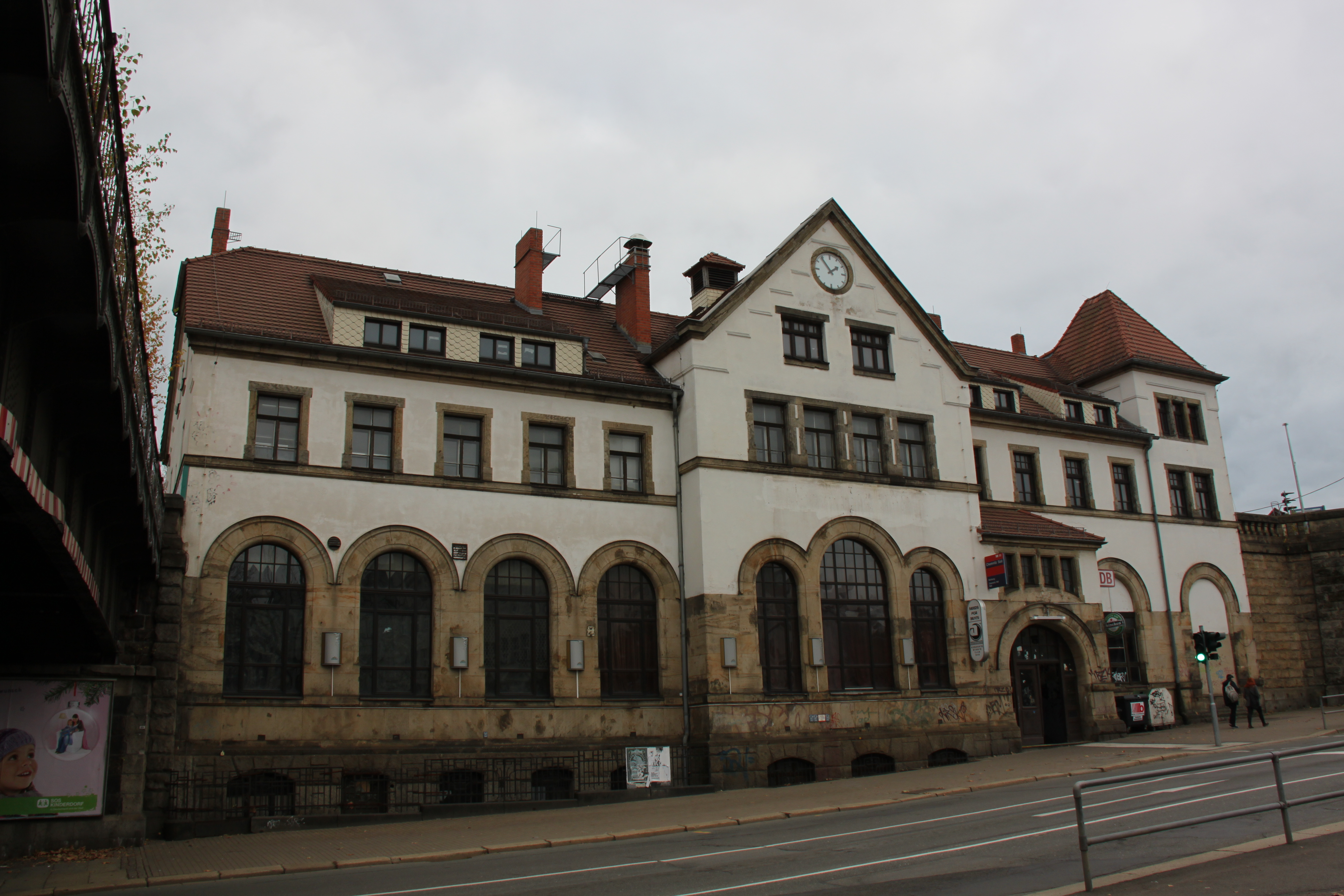
Chemnitz Süd station

Chemnitz Süd (50°49′24″N 12°55′34″E)

The station later called Chemnitz Süd was built in 1875 when the Chemnitz-Aue-Adorfer Eisenbahn-Gesellschaft (Chemnitz–Aue–Adorf Railway Company) established its own station for its Chemnitz–Adorf railway. The company was nationalised one year later, and the trains were then connected to the main station, as were the trains on the Zwönitz–Chemnitz Süd railway, which opened in 1895. Today's station was built during the 1900s during the raising and lowering of sections of the line. For the first time, trains on the Dresden–Werdau line also stopped; there had been no platform on this line before.

Particularly in freight transport, Chemnitz Süd had early significance and its large freight station section was administered as a separate operating point for a time.

Chemnitz Mitte (50°49′35″N 12°54′45″E)

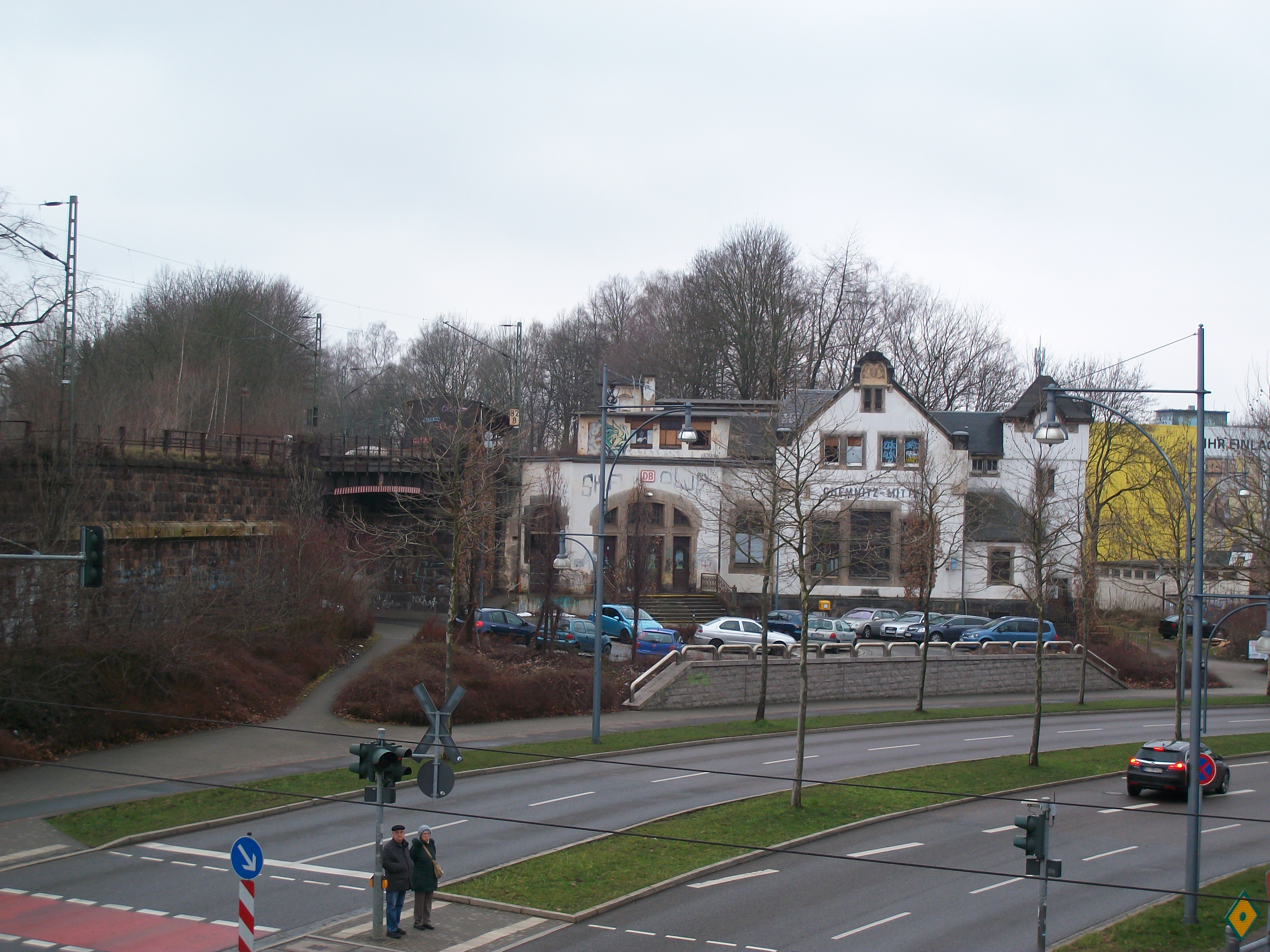
Chemnitz Mitte station (2016)

Platform for Werdau (2013)

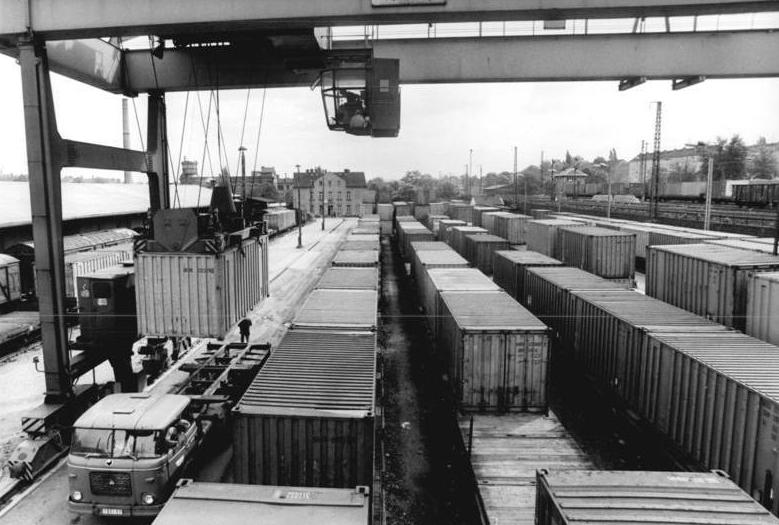
Karl-Marx-Stadt-Kappel container yard, 1982

Chemnitz-Kappel (50°49′24″N 12°54′09″E)

The halt had five different names during its period of operations:

- until 31 July 1882: Chemnitz Kohlenbf
- until 30 April 1904: Kappel i Sachsen
- until 30 June 1911: Chemnitz-Kappel (Güterbf)
- until 9 May 1953: Chemnitz-Kappel
- until 29 May 1990: Karl-Marx-Stadt-Kappel
- since 30 May 1990: Chemnitz-Kappel

The 1880 station was opened as Chemnitz Kohlenbahnhof ("Chemnitz coal yard"). This meant that the numerous factories in the west of the city had access to a nearby freight yard. At first, it had been planned to build a yard at Nicolaivorstadt, but since the land required for the construction was much cheaper in Kappel, the yard was built there.

Chemnitz-Kappel was converted into a container depot at the end of the 1960s. The container loading facility went into operation in December 1968 as a separate operating point. The yard was finally closed in 1999. After that, all the tracks have been dismantled so that the area is as run down as the Hilbersdorf yard.

Chemnitz-Schönau station

Chemnitz-Schönau (50°49′05″N 12°52′35″E)

The halt has had four different names during its operations:

- until 31 October 1950: Wanderer-Werke
- until 9 May 1953: Chemnitz Wanderer-Werke
- until 29 May 1990: Karl-Marx-Stadt-Schönau
- since 30 May 1990: Chemnitz-Schönau

The station was opened in 1940, mainly for commuter traffic to the numerous industrial enterprises along this section of the line. Today, the facilities consist of two side platforms, which are connected by a pedestrian bridge.

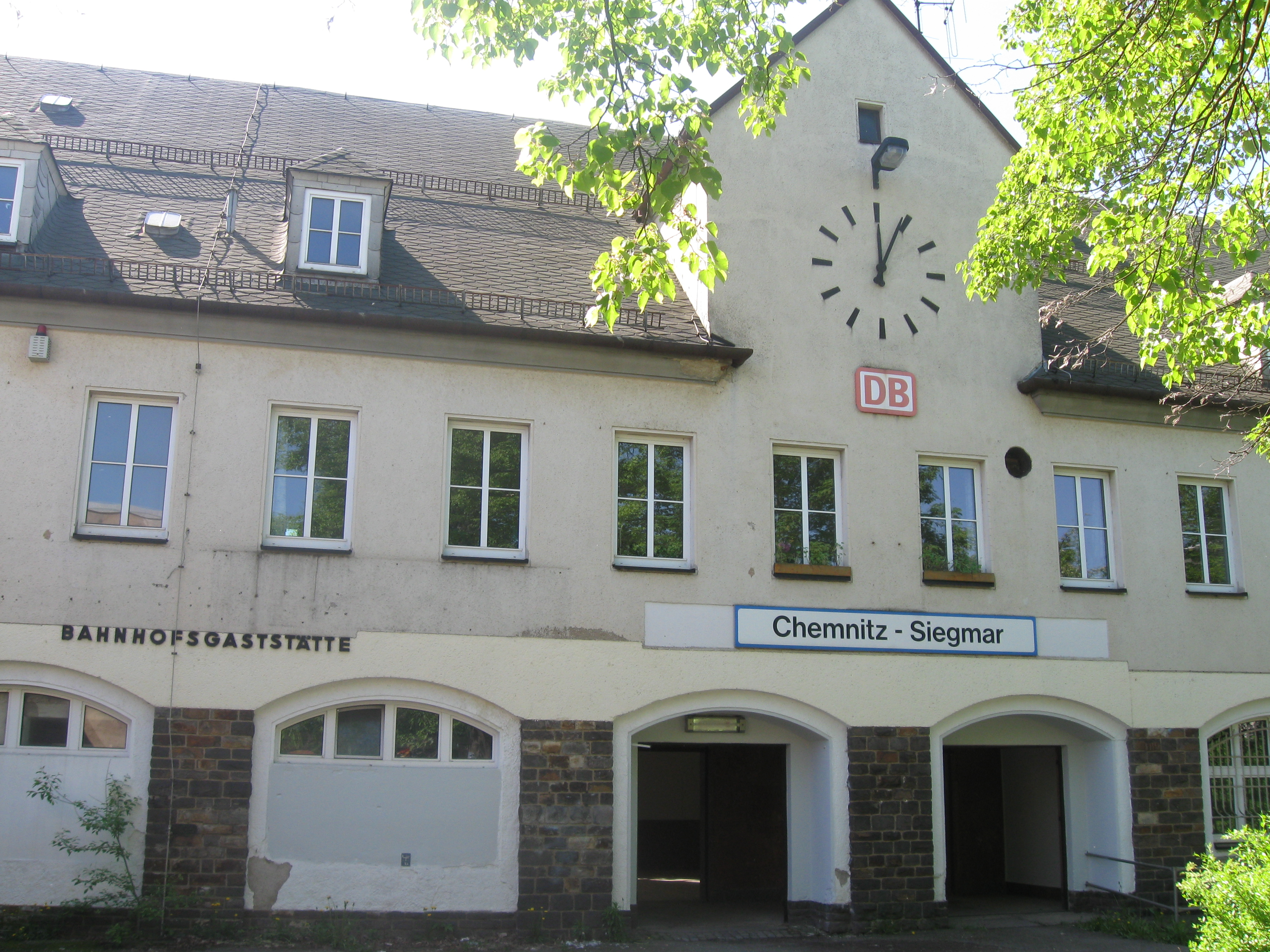
Chemnitz-Siegmar station

Chemnitz-Siegmar (50°48′57″N 12°50′50″E)

The station had four different names during its period of operations:

- at its opening: Siegmar
- until 31 October 1950: Siegmar-Schönau
- until 9 May 1953: Chemnitz-Siegmar
- until 29 May 1990: Karl-Marx-Stadt-Siegmar
- since 30 May 1990: Chemnitz-Siegmar

Although the station was opened in 1858, it gained importance during the period of industrialisation in the late 19th century when numerous companies built larger factories in the station area.

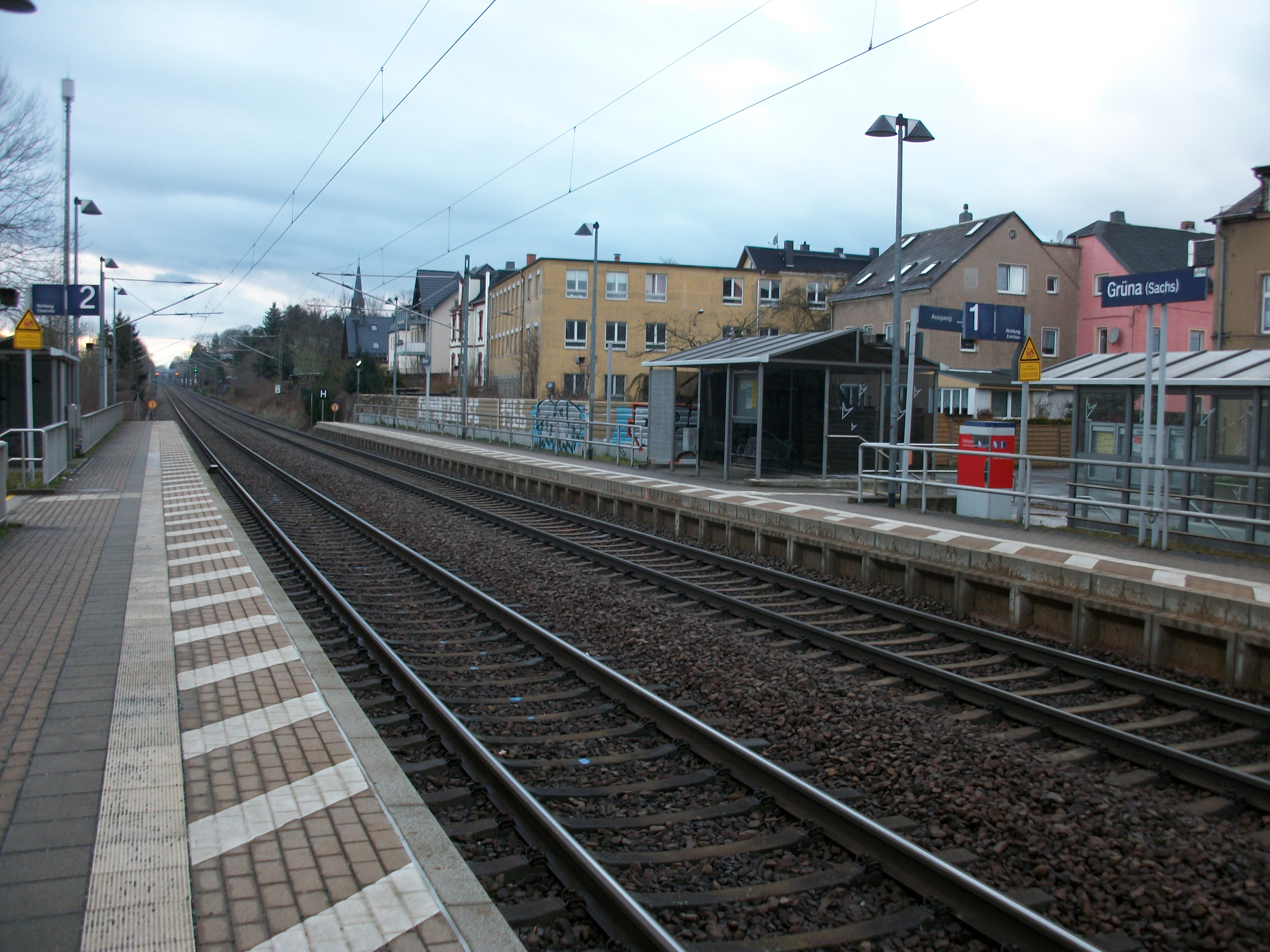
Grüna (Sachs) (2016) station

Grüna (Sachs) (50°48′41″N 12°47′55″E)

Grüna (Sachs) halt was opened on 15 November 1858. Grüna had a second station between 1897 and 2004 called Grüna (Sachs) ob Bf, which was built on the Limbach–Wüstenbrand and Küchwald–Obergrüna railways. The halt on the Dresden–Werdau railway bore the following names:

- until 1910: Grüna
- until 1911: Grüna (Sachsen) Hp
- until 1933: Grüna (Sa) Hp
- since 1933: Grüna (Sachs) Hp

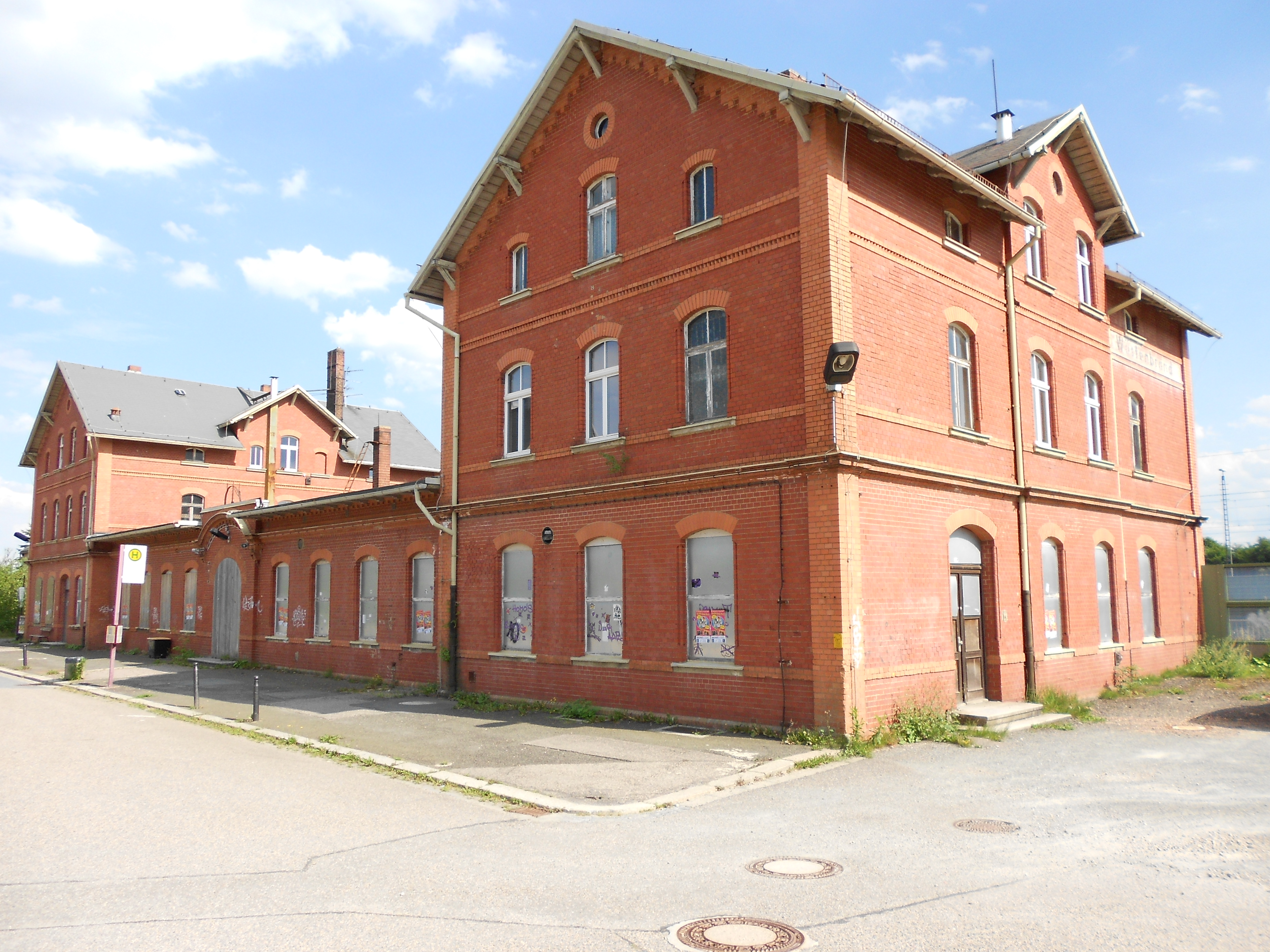
Wüstenbrand station

Wüstenbrand (50°48′19″N 12°45′23″E)

Wüstenbrand station has existed since the opening of the railway in 1858. At first only the Neuoelsnitz–Wüstenbrand railway of the Chemnitz-Würschnitzer Eisenbahngesellschaft (Chemnitz-Würschnitz Railway Company) connected there. It was later extended to Höhlteich. The Limbach–Wüstenbrand railway was opened in 1897. The latter partly served together with the Küchwald–Obergrüna railway (opened in 1903) as a detour for the Chemnitz–Wüstenbrand section.

All three lines have now been closed, but Wüstenbrand can now be used for overtaking. There are also two freight tracks, which are not currently used.

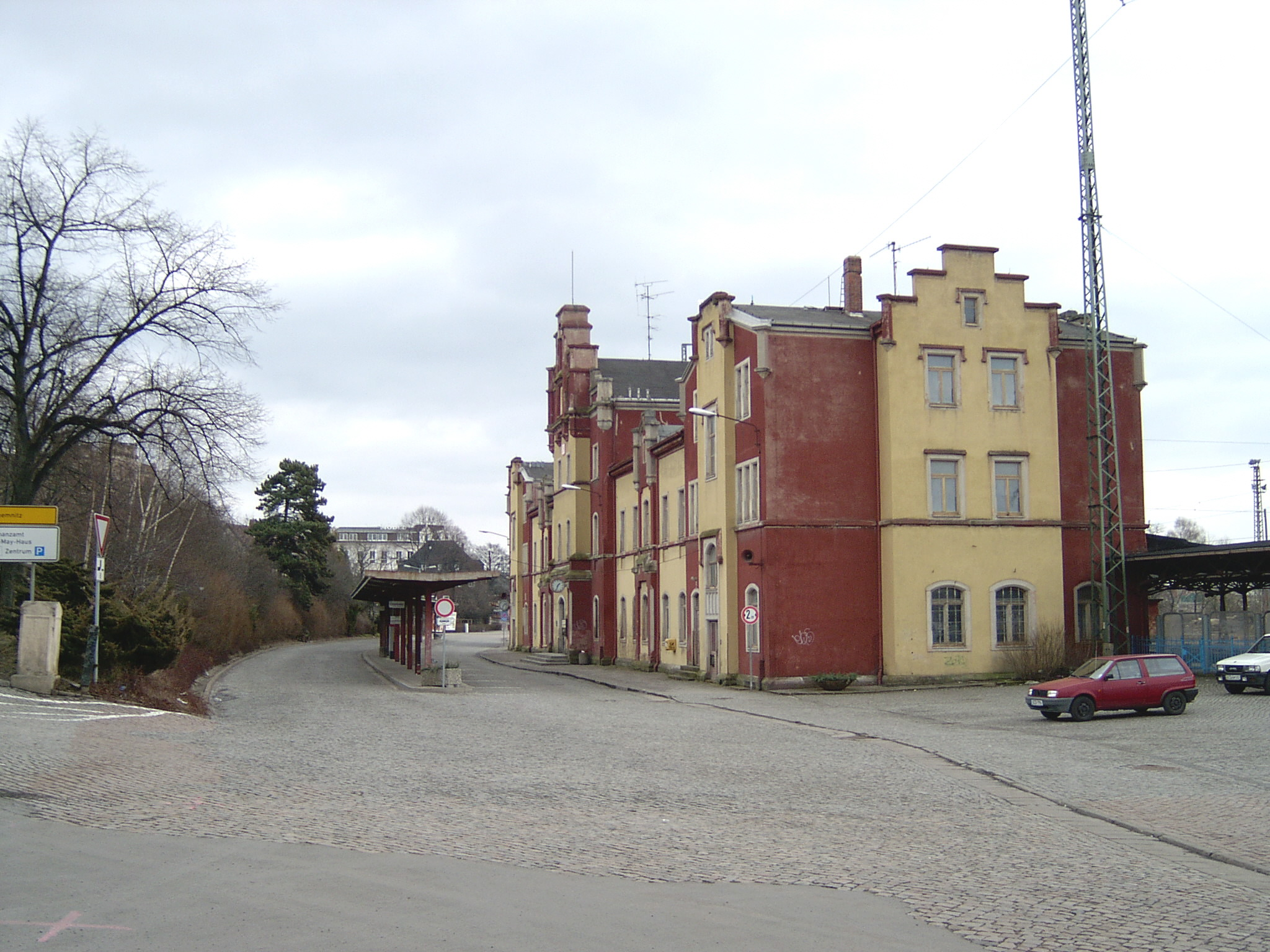
The now demolished entrance building of Hohenstein-Ernstthal with the station forecourt, 2003

Hohenstein-Ernstthal (50°47′54″N 12°42′22″E)

The Hohenstein-Ernstthal–Oelsnitz Tramway, an interurban, had its starting point on the forecourt of Hohenstein-Ernstthal station from 1913 to 1960.

The station was extensively rebuilt in the 2000s. The entrance building, part of which dated from the beginning, has been demolished and replaced by a bus station. There are now only three tracks in the station.

St. Egidien (50°47′21″N 12°37′21″E)

St. Egidien station was opened on 15 November 1858. Since 1879 the station has also been the terminus of the Stollberg–St. Egidien railway, which have been operated by diesel City-Bahn Chemnitz services since its modernisation.

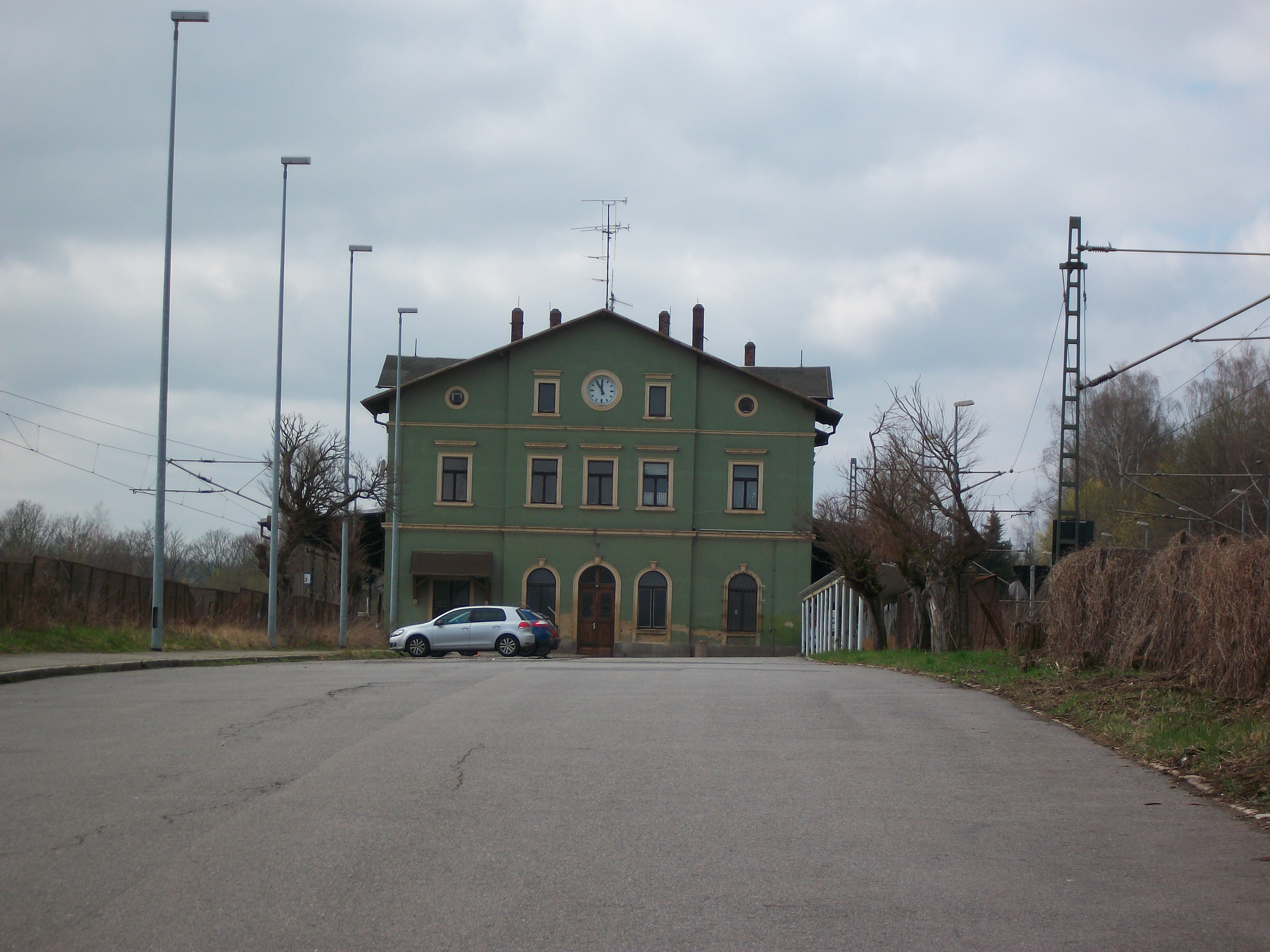
St. Egidien station, front view (2016)

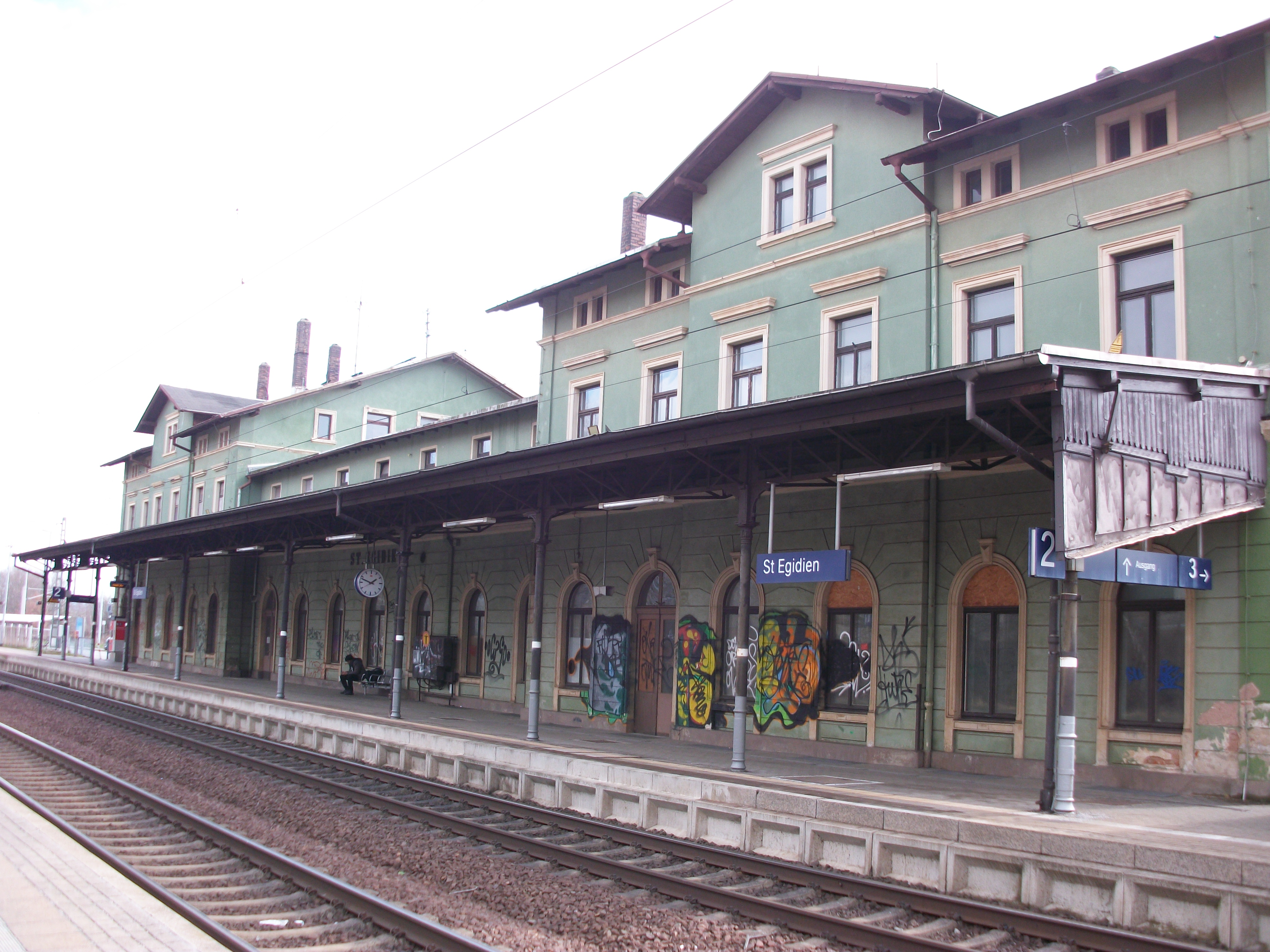
St. Egidien station, track side(2016)

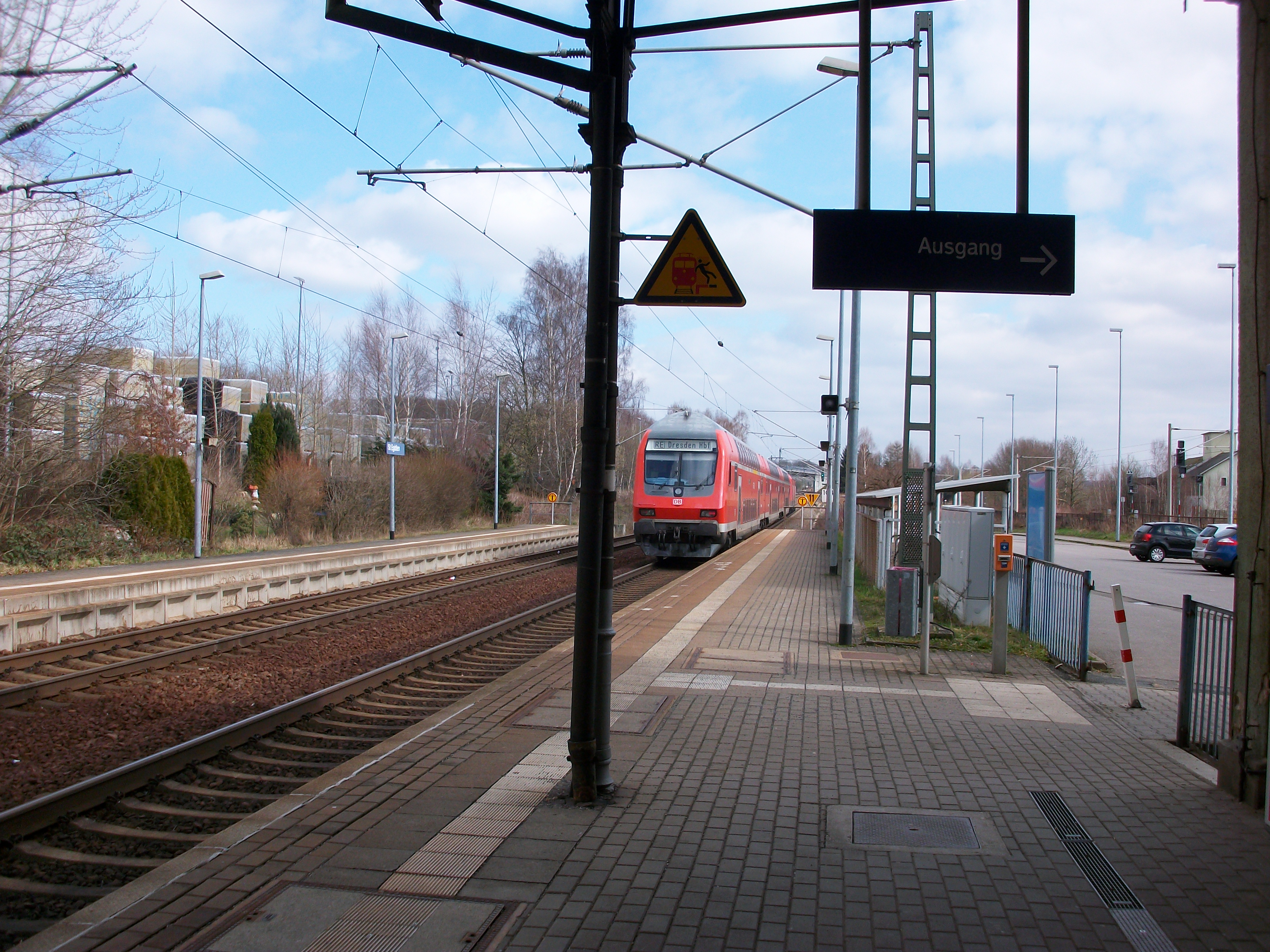
Non-stopping RE service to Dresden in St. Egidien station (2016)

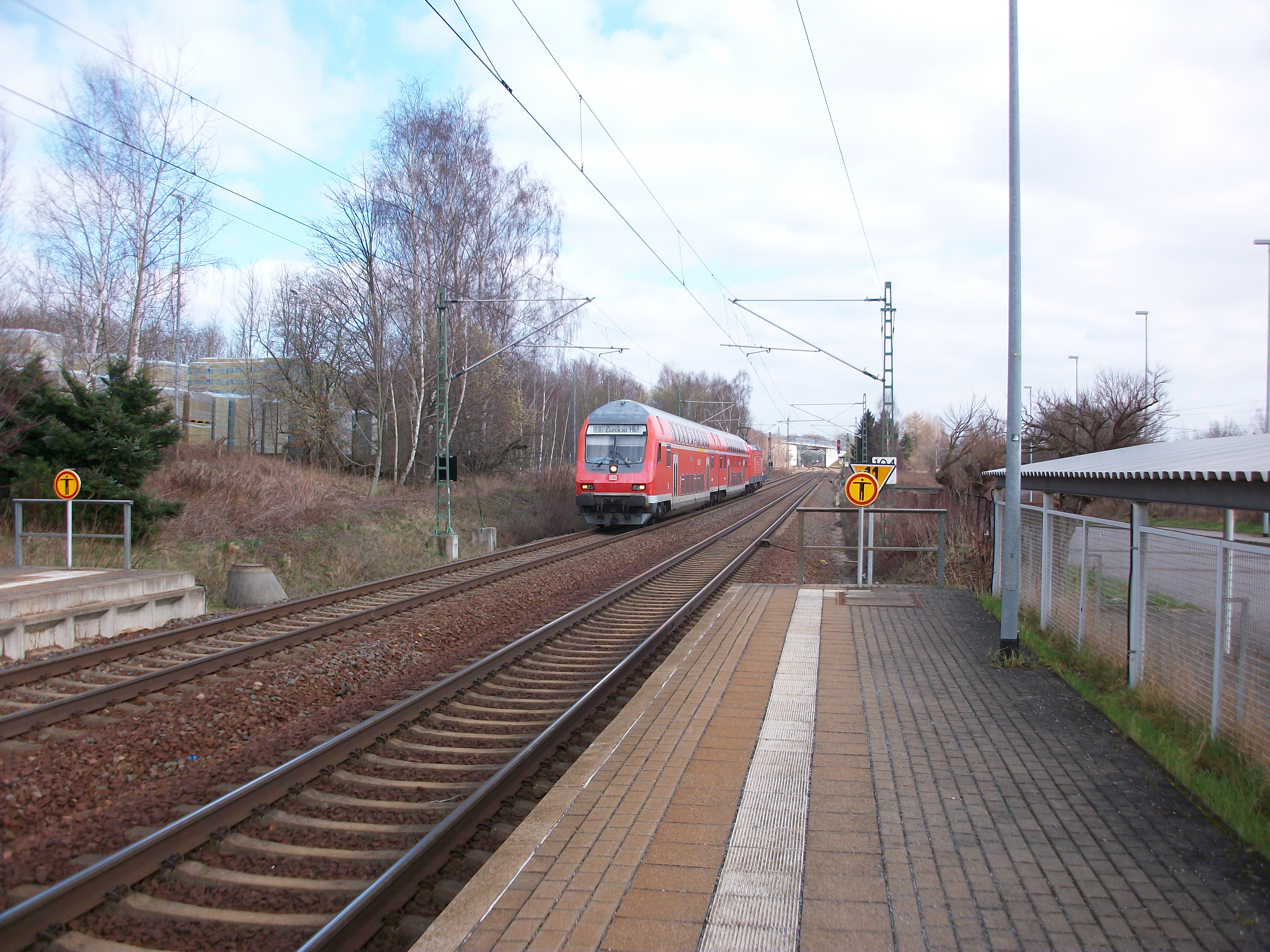
St. Egidien station with an approaching RB service to Zwickau (2016)

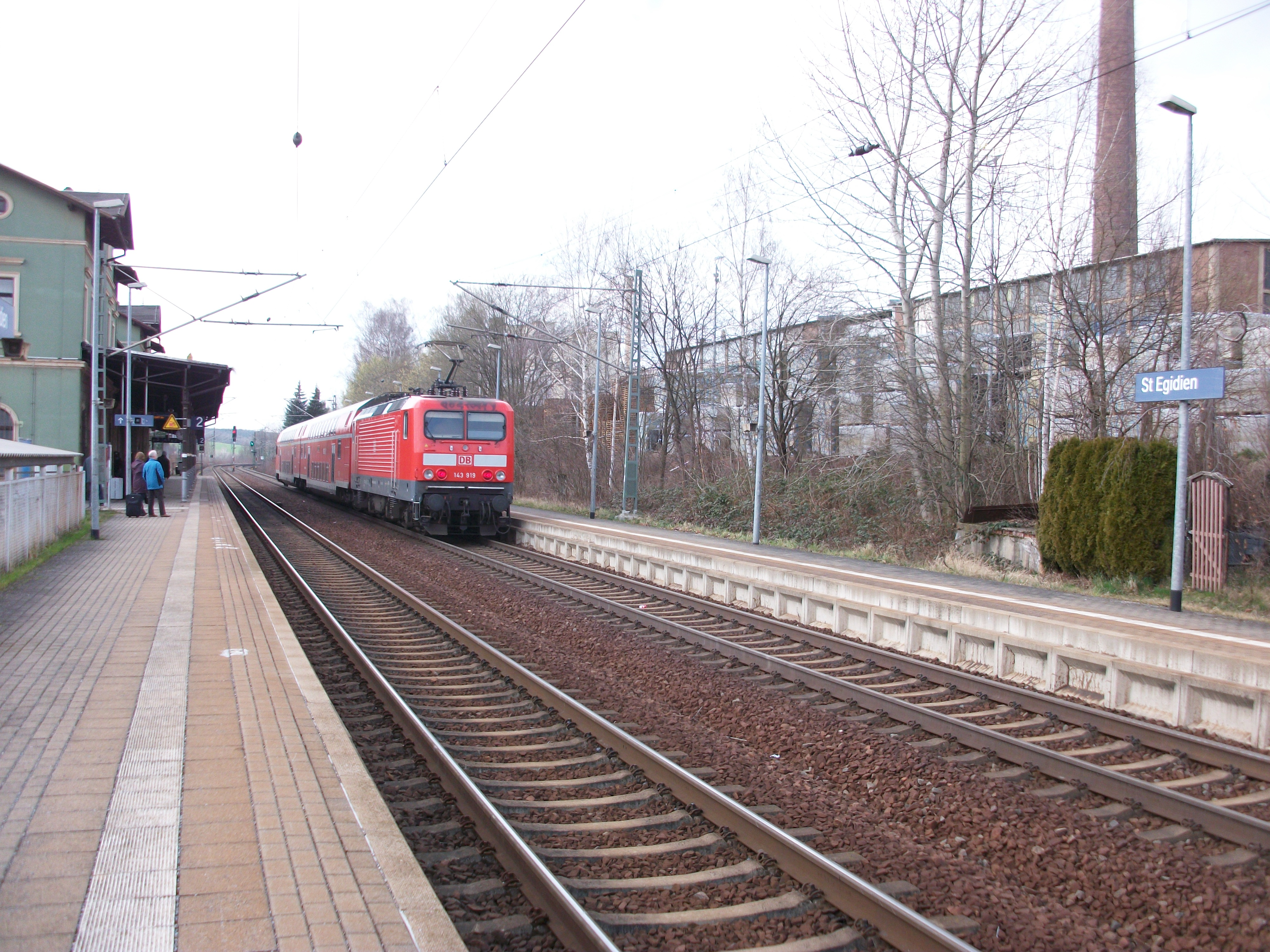
St. Egidien station with RB service to Zwickau (2016)

Glauchau (Sachs) (50°49′44″N 12°32′57″E)

Until 1875, Glauchau station was a through station. With the opening of the Glauchau–Wurzen railway, Glauchau also received a locomotive depot, which later became Bahnbetriebswerk Glauchau, which was an independent operating point until the end of 1993.

Glauchau-Schönbörnchen (50°49′18″N 12°30′06″E)

Glauchau-Schönbörnchen halt (until 1931: Schönbörnchen) has existed since 1 November 1885. Previously there had only been a junction with the line to Gößnitz. With the conversion of the station tracks to electronic interlocking, the station, which was temporarily classified as a station (Bahnhof), reverted to being a halt (Haltepunkt, that is it has no sets of points).

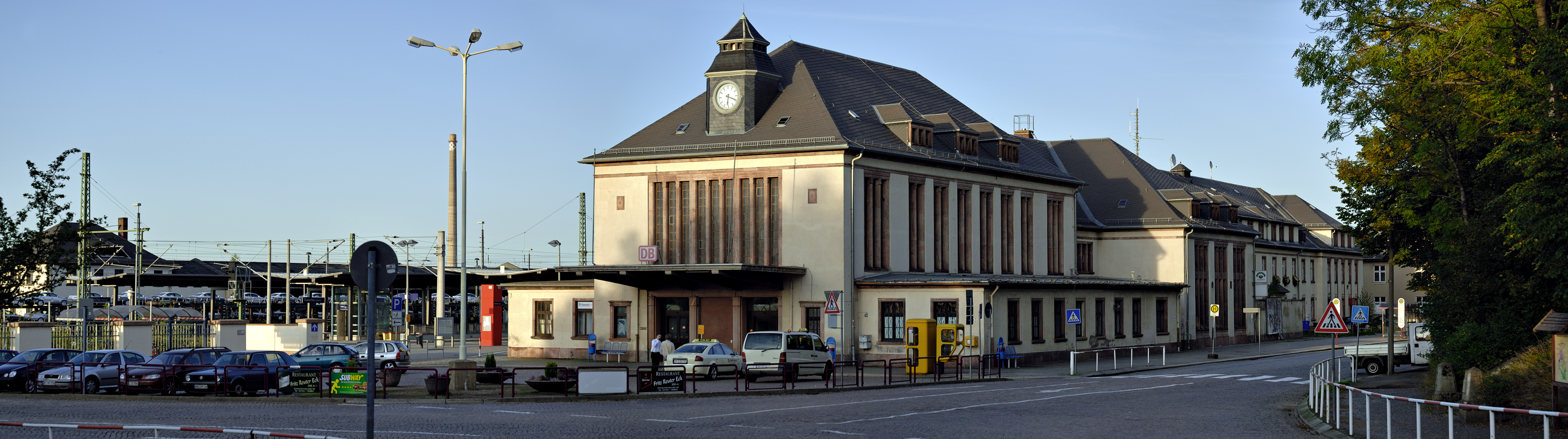
Glauchau station

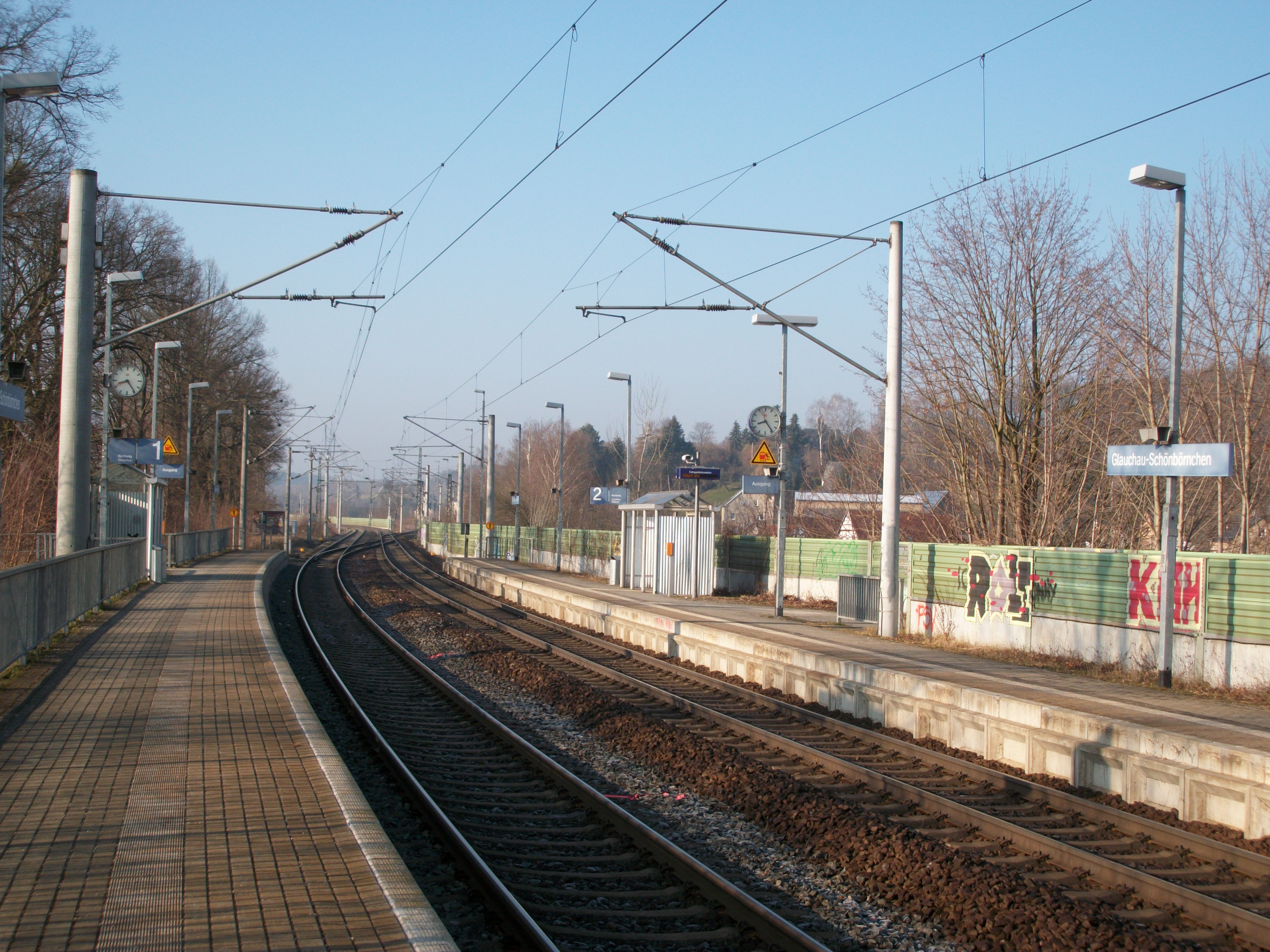
Glauchau-Schönbörnchen halt (2016)

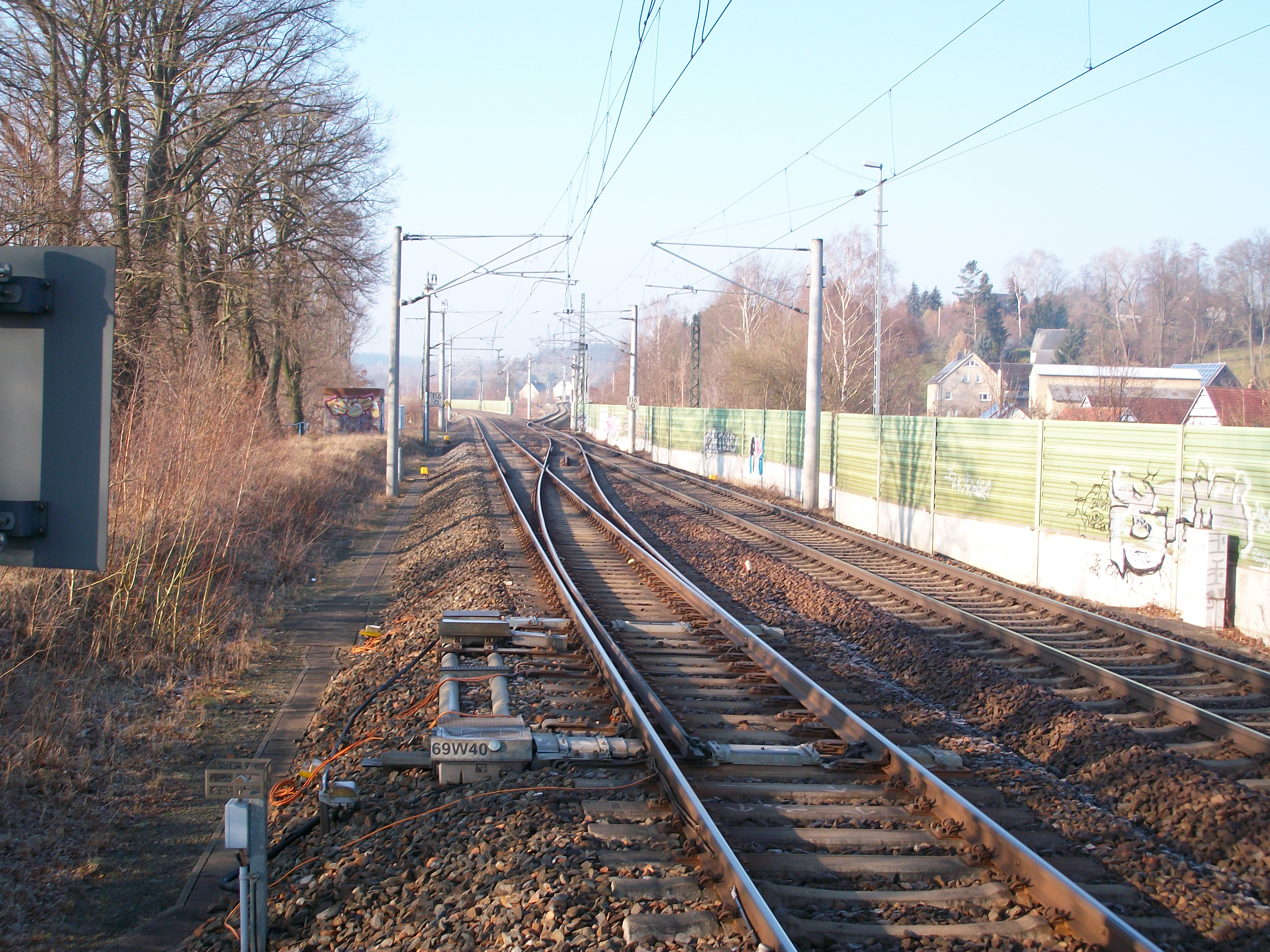
Glauchau-Schönbörnchen halt, junction to Meerane (2016)

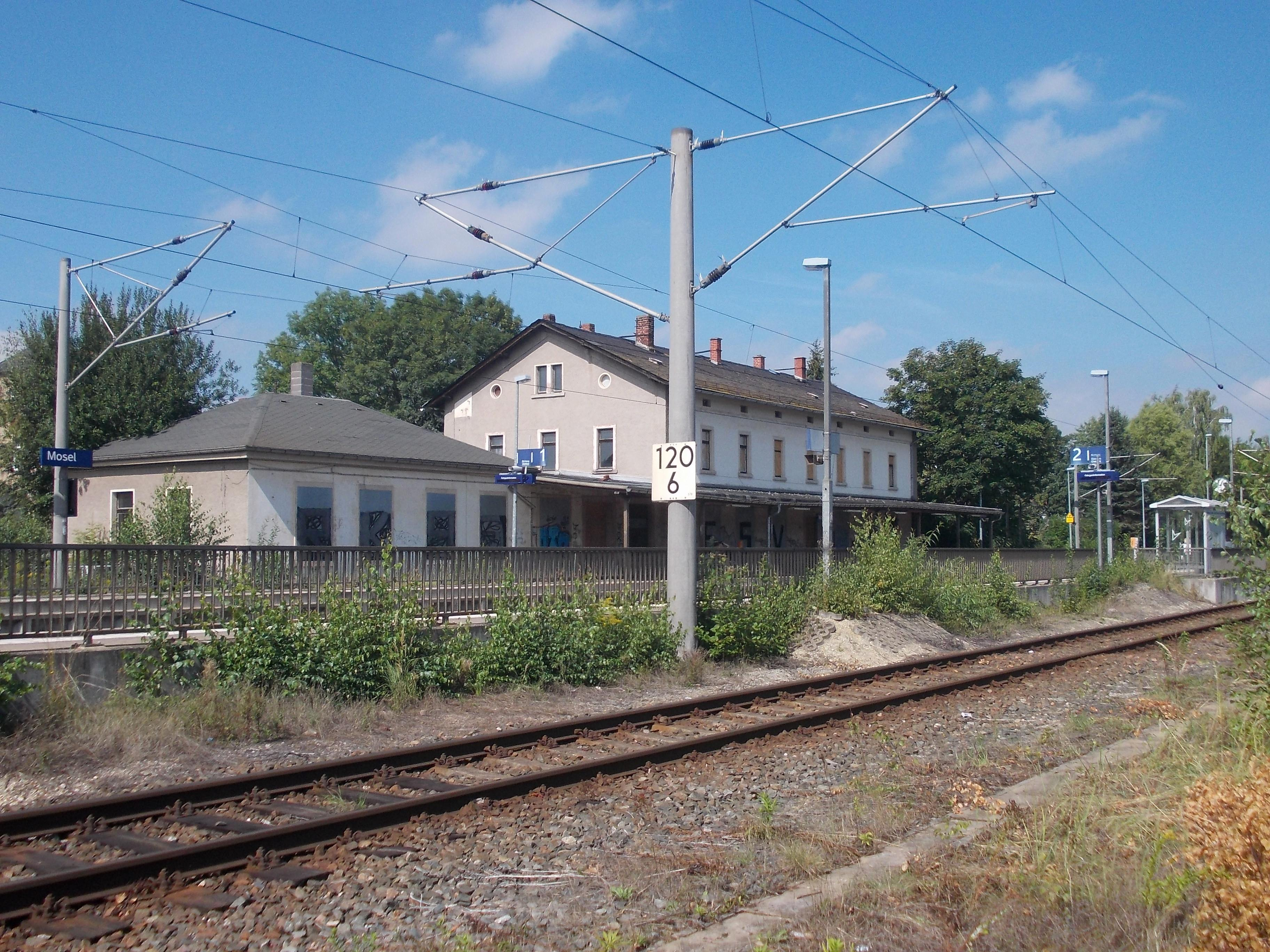
Mosel station

Mosel (50°47′01″N 12°28′53″E)

Mosel halt has existed since the opening of the line in 1858 and was reclassified as a station on 1 January 1875. With the opening of the 750 mm gauge Mosel–Ortmannsdorf railway, Mosel became a local railway junction in 1885; a previous concession for the construction of a railway through Mülsen by a private company had been cancelled before the beginning of the construction. In 1893, the freight only Zwickau–Crossen–Mosel railway was opened. The narrow gauge railway was closed and dismantled in 1951 and the industrial railway also lost its importance in the 1990s. In addition to the delivery of components to the nearby Volkswagen works, the busy connecting line to this plant also starts in Mosel.

Oberrothenbach (50°45′50″N 12°28′33″E)

Oberrothenbach halt was opened on 1 May 1886 under the administration of Mosel station. It consisted only of two side platforms, a passenger subway and a wooden waiting room built in 1895. The latter was not used from the end of the 1970s and was demolished in 1982.

Zwickau-Pölbitz (50°44′14″N 12°28′47″E)

Pölbitz halt was opened on 1 April 1895. That year, Pölbitz was incorporated into Zwickau. The halt was renamed Zwickau and from 1911 called Zwickau (Sa) Hp (Zwickau Saxony halt). In 1924, it was renamed Zwickau-Pölbitz. As a result of industrialisation, the district of Pölbitz had grown strongly, from then on the halt was used mainly by commuter traffic. During the elevation of the railway tracks in Zwickau, a massive entrance building was built in Pölbitz from 1923 to 1925. Since the halt is no longer staffed, the building is empty.

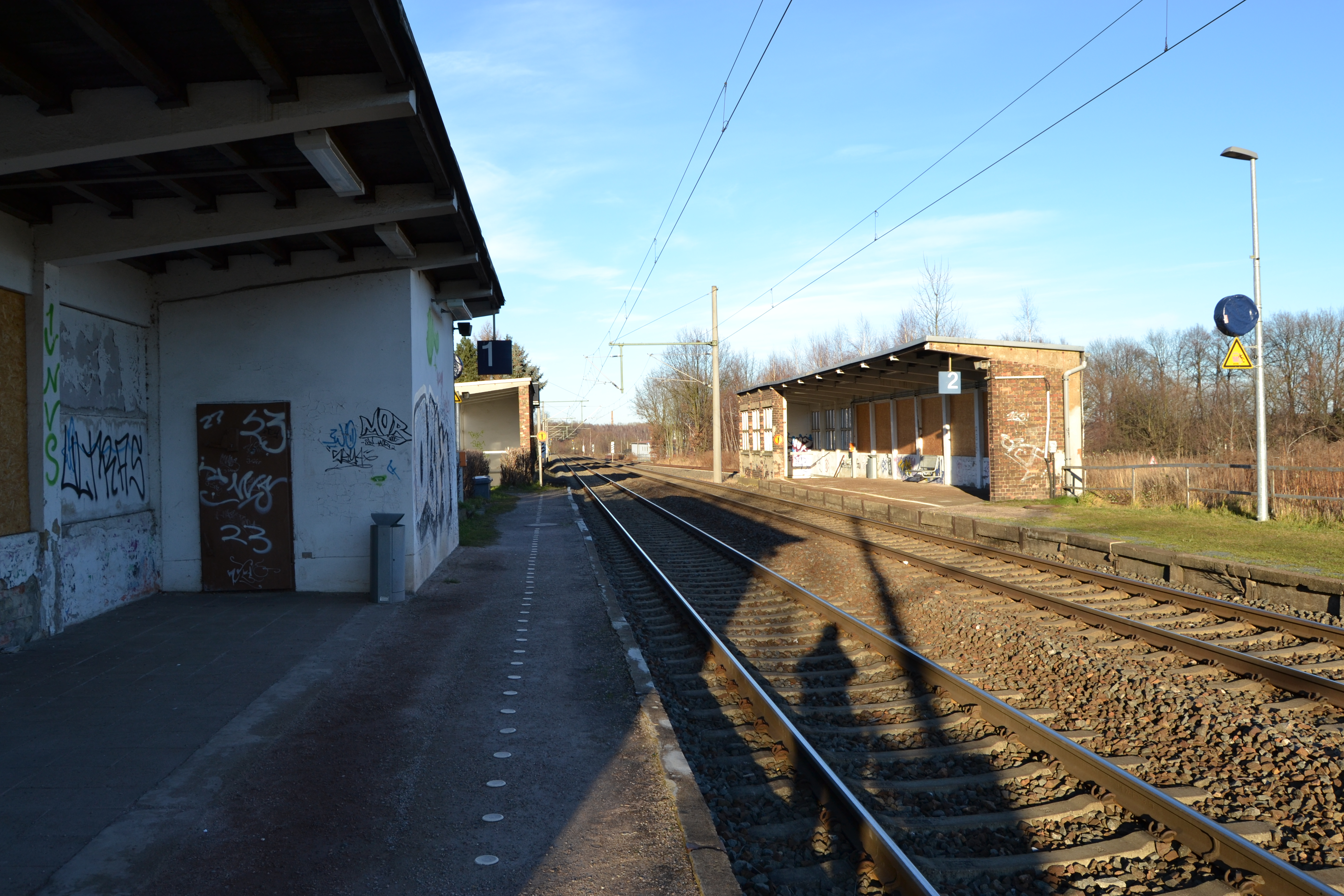
Oberrothenbach halt

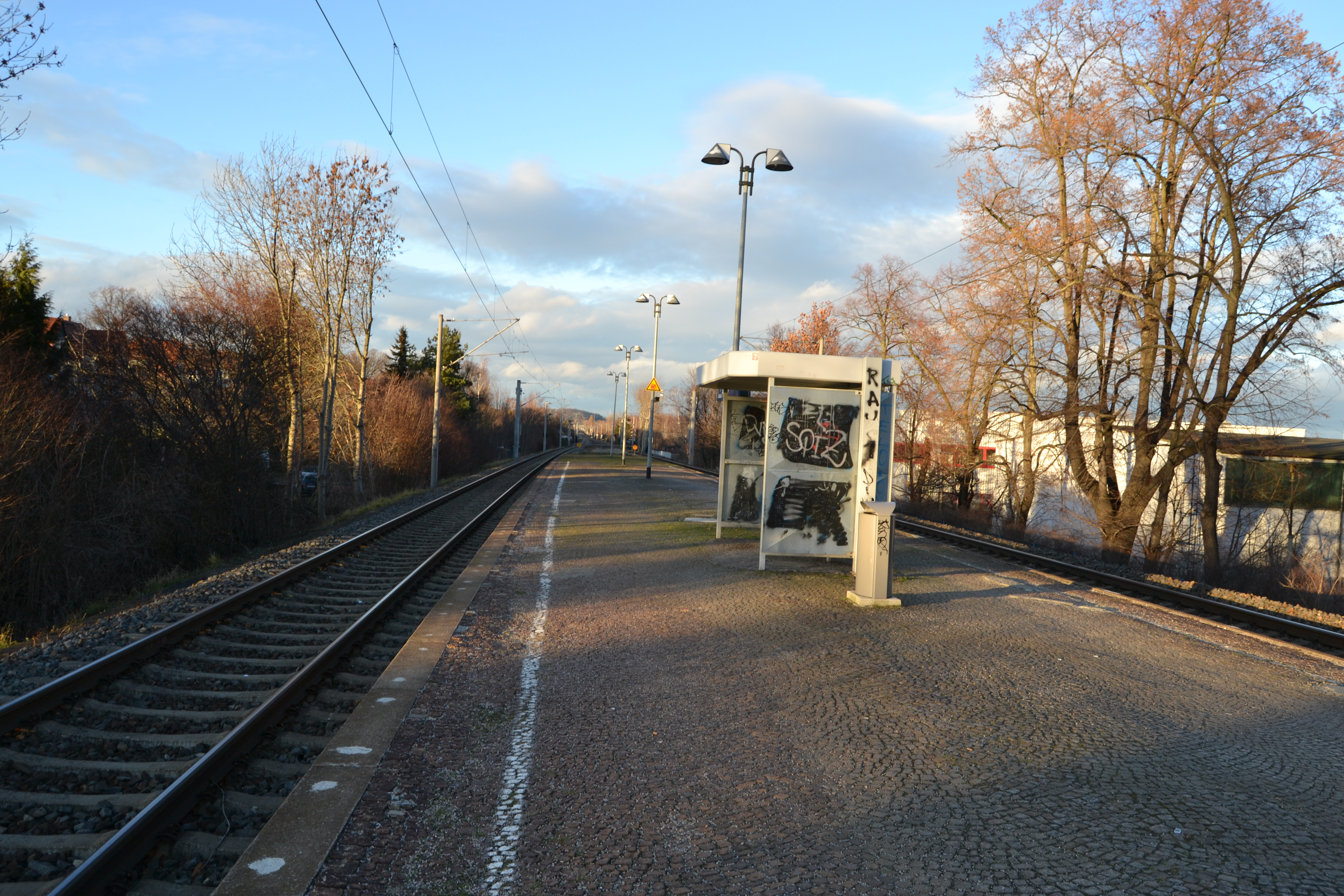
Zwickau-Pölbitz halt

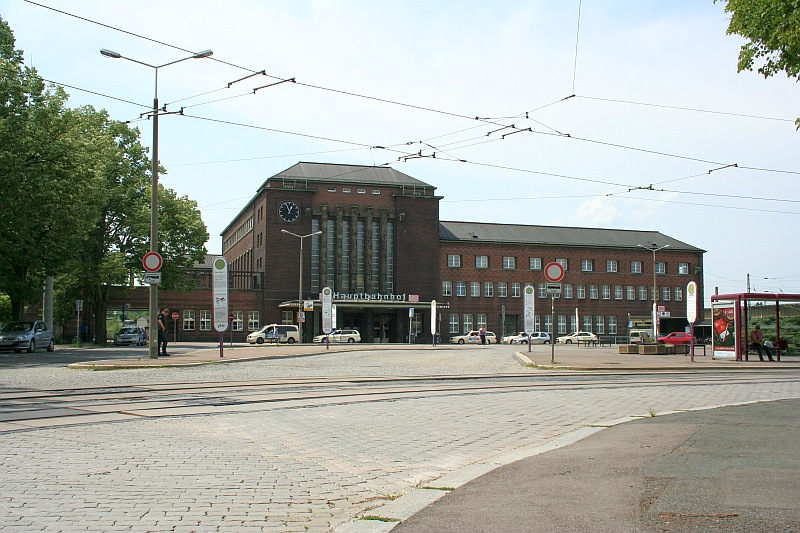
The entrance building of Zwickau Hauptbahnhof, which was opened in 1936

Zwickau (Sachs) Hbf (50°42′52″N 12°28′29″E)

The first Zwickau station was opened in 1845, when a branch line was opened to the Werdau wye. In the 1860s, the station became an important railway junction when the lines from Chemnitz and Schwarzenberg were handed over to traffic.

The Zwickau–Falkenstein railway, opened in 1875, also begins at the Hauptbahnhof, even though initially the Zwickau-Lengenfeld-Falkensteiner Eisenbahn-Gesellschaft opened its station to the southeast of today's Hauptbahnhof. Only two years later a new track alignment was completed and the now nationalised line no longer approached the Hauptbahnhof from the west, instead it ran from the east.

RAW „7. Oktober“ (50°42′24″N 12°26′29″E)

RAW “7. Oktober” halt, which was not open to the public, only served the railway establishments of the marshalling yard and the workshop and was not listed in the timetable. No trains have stopped at the halt since 1997/98 and the infrastructure was dismantled in 2006.

Lichtentanne (Sachs) (50°41′57″N 12°25′10″E)

Lichtentanne (Sachs) station was opened on 1 April 1885. It has had the following names:

- until 1907: Lichtentanne
- until 1911: Lichtentanne i Sachsen
- until 1933: Lichtentanne (Sa)
- since 1933: Lichtentanne (Sachs)

The former entrance building is no longer in use and is located at the edge of today's halt.

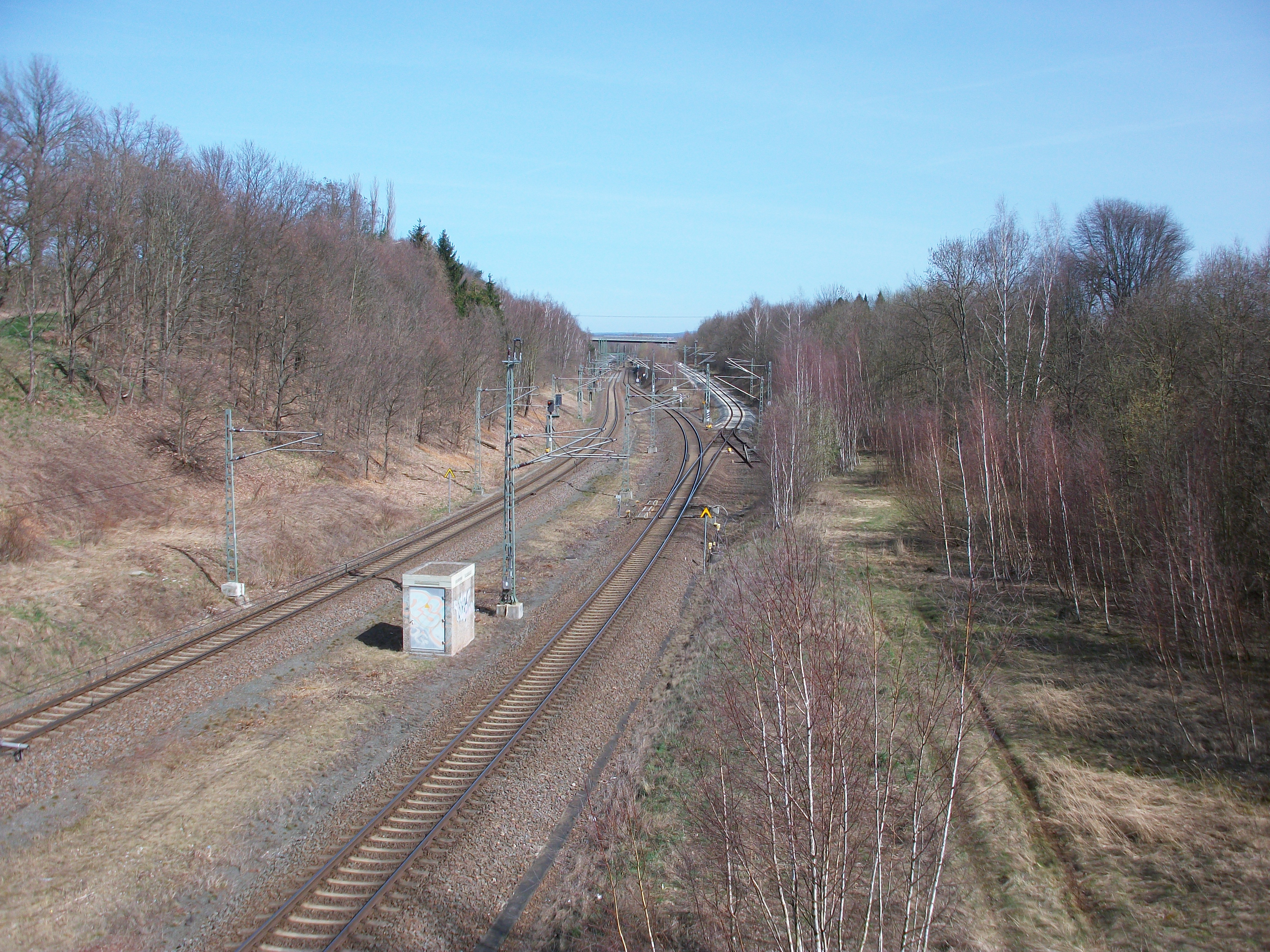
Lichtentanne station, approach track from Zwickau (2016)

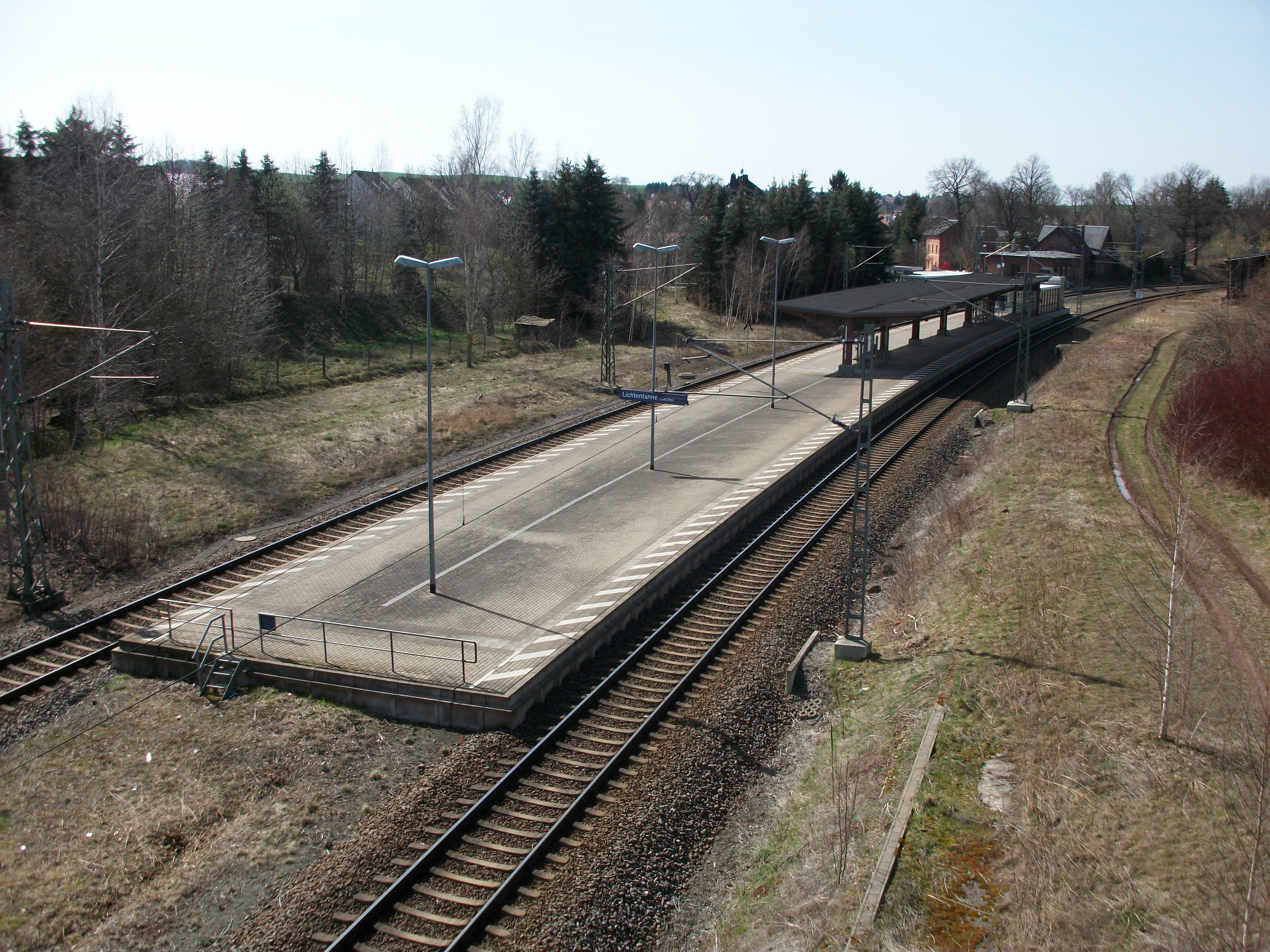
Lichtentanne station from above (2016)

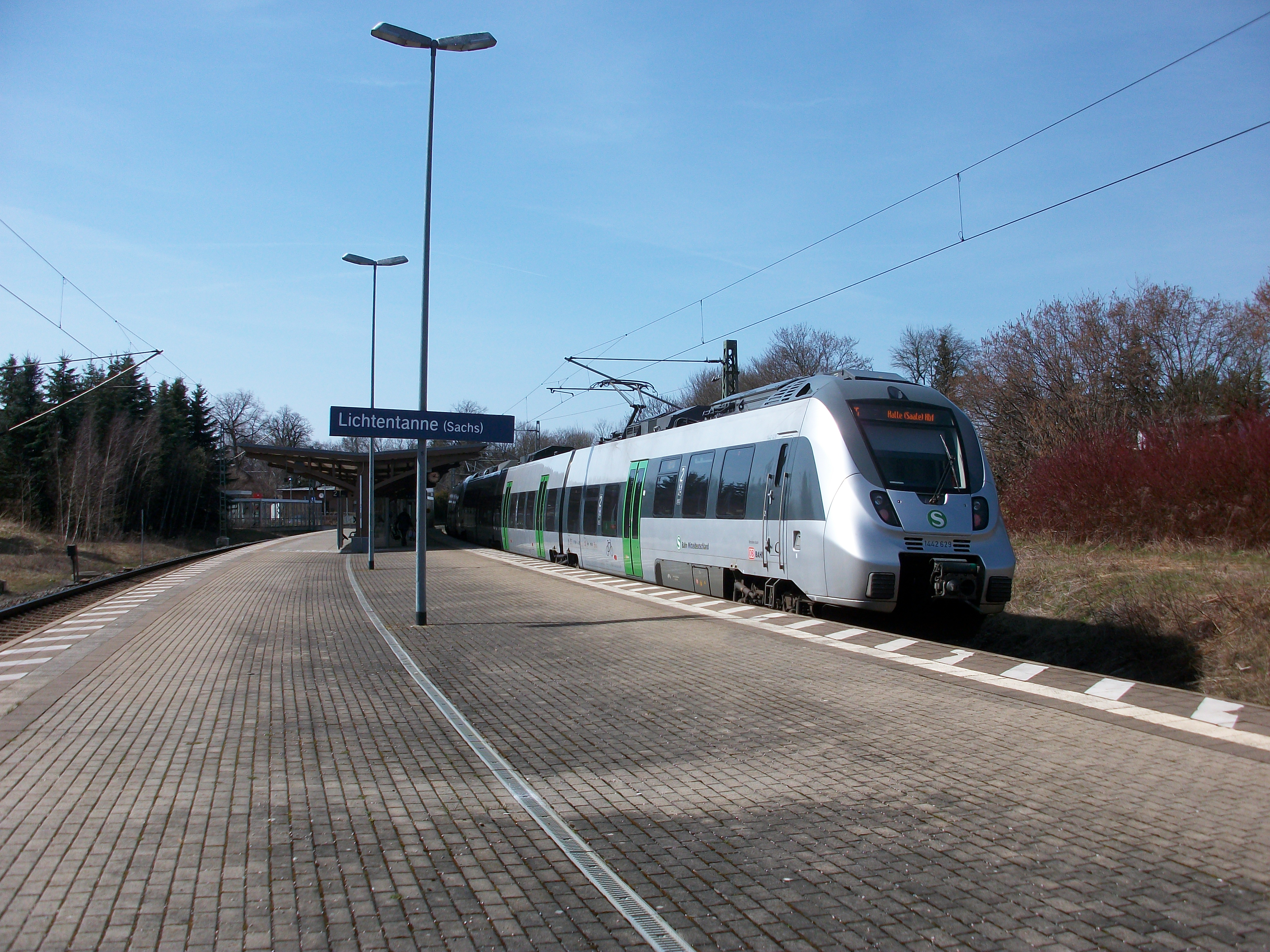
S-Bahn service in Lichtentanne station (2016)

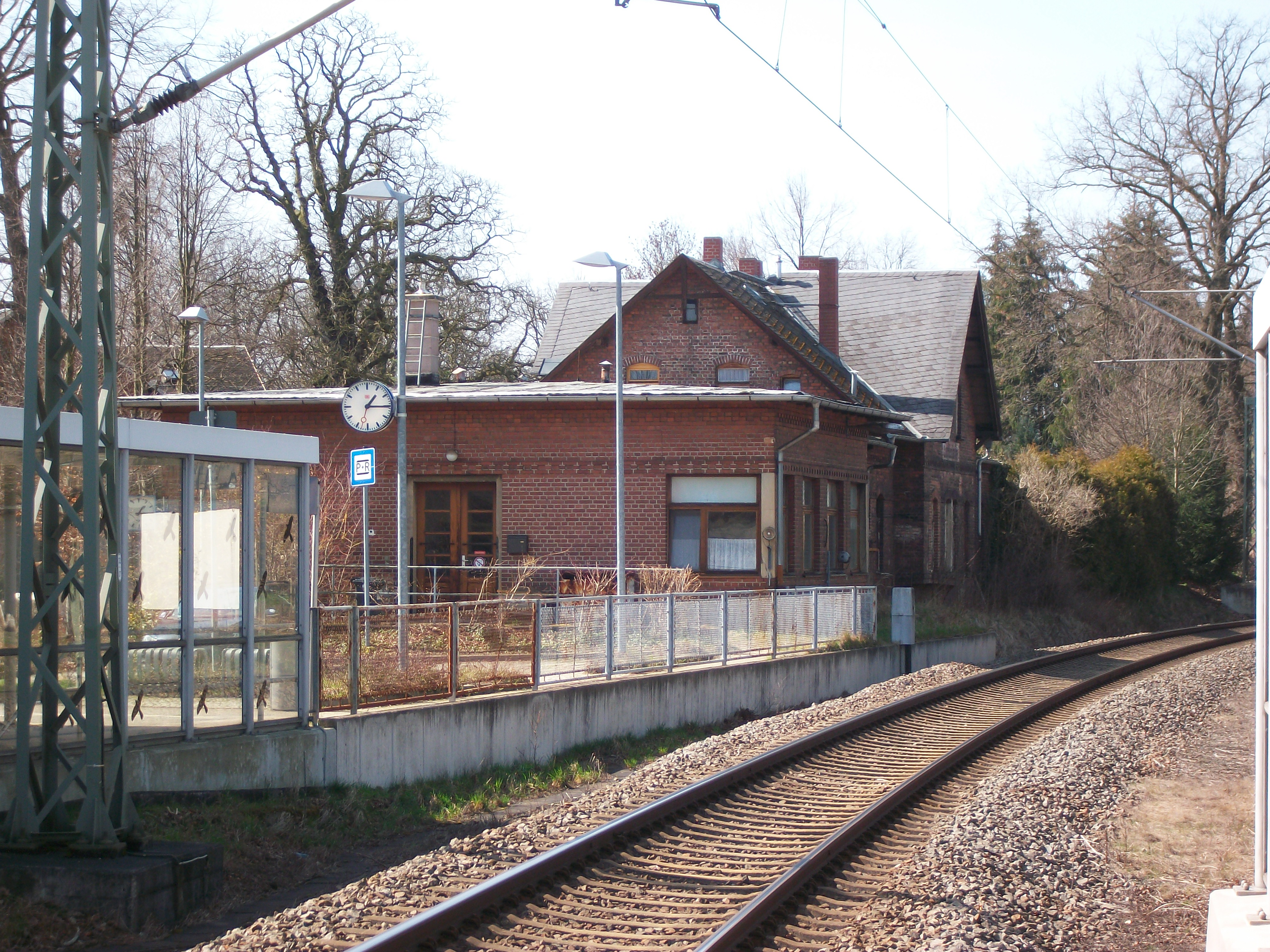
Lichtentanne station, old entrance building (2016)

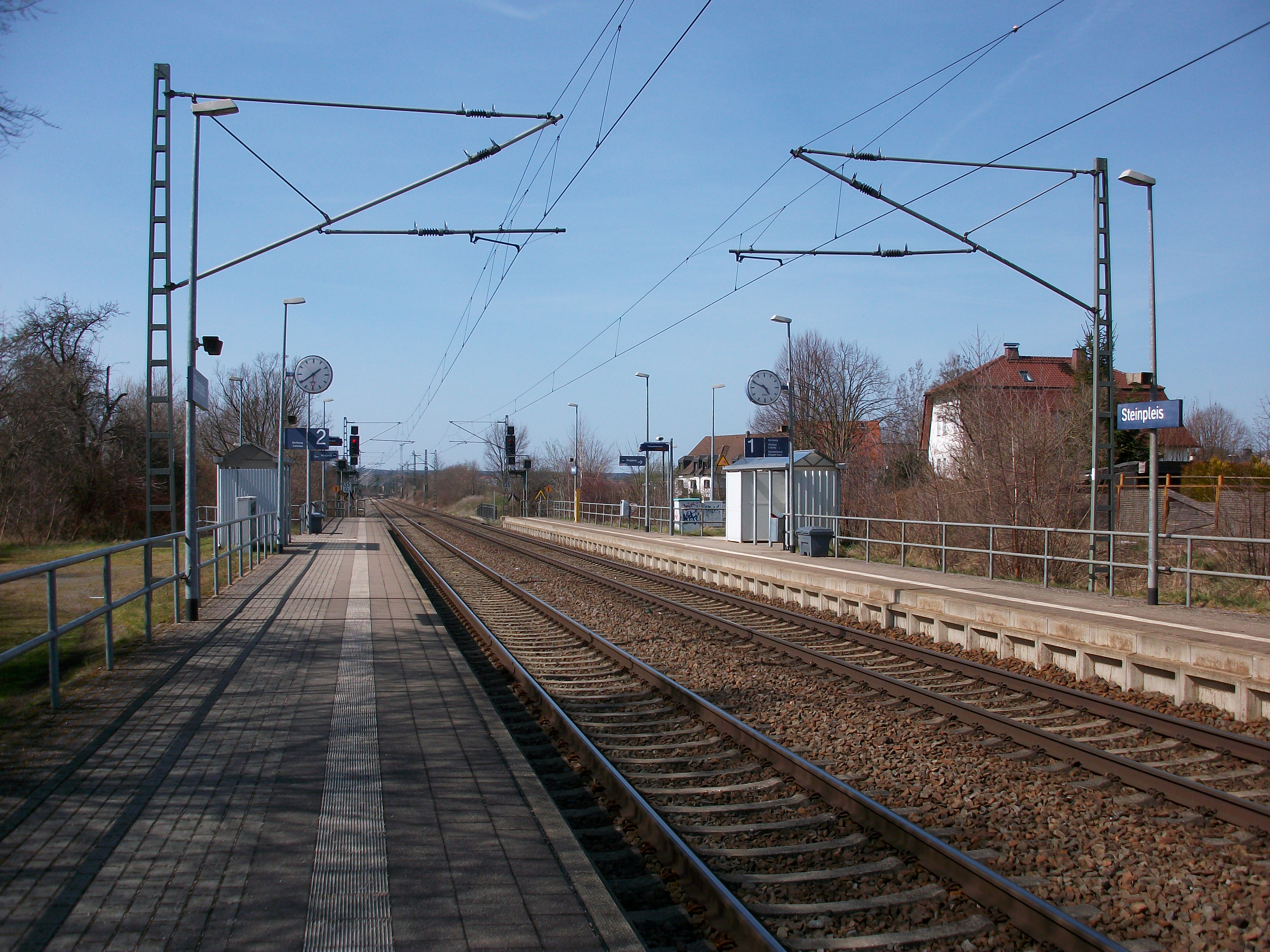
Steinpleis halt (2016)

Steinpleis (50°42′32″N 12°23′39″E)

Steinpleis halt was opened on 1 November 1911. It is located south of the village and is the last stop before Werdau wye.

Werdau wye junction (50°42′42″N 12°22′44″E)

With the completion of the railway line from Leipzig to Werdau (Leipzig–Hof railway) on 6 September 1845, the 8.10 km-long branch to Zwickau was also put into operation. With the further commissioning of the line towards Reichenbach on 31 May 1846, the later wye (Bogendreieck) went into operation as a simple branch line. Construction of the connecting curve began on 25 June 1855 and construction of new main line tracks towards Zwickau began on 15 November 1855. The two new main tracks were opened on 15 November 1858. On 1 January 1856, the twin-track Zwickau–Neumark connecting curve was put into operation at the former Werdau junction, which was now referred to as Bogendreieck Werdau.

As a result of its connection of the Dresden–Werdau and Leipzig–Hof railways, the Werdau wye has a significance that extends beyond Saxony. It is part of the Saxon-Franconian trunk line (Sachsen-Franken-Magistrale) and is included in the plans for the Mid-Germany Railway (Mitte-Deutschland-Verbindung).

=== Engineering infrastructure ===
Felskeller tunnel'

Felskeller tunnel was near the first Dresden-Plauen station. The 56-metre-long (184 ft) tunnel had very little cover until 1894/95, when it was removed.

Edle Krone tunnel (50°56′52″N 13°34′57″E)

After the removal of the roofs of the other two tunnels, the 122-metre-long (400 ft) Edle Krone tunnel was the last remaining tunnel on the line. During the electrification of the line in the 1960s, replacing it with a cutting was considered. In the end, the tunnel profile was expanded to create the necessary clearance for the installation of the overhead contact lines.

== Traffic ==
At the timetable change on 30 September 1973, a "dense suburban service" was added on the Dresden–Tharandt section. Since May 1992 these services have been officially marketed as the Dresden S-Bahn. The line to Tharandt was initially designated as S5, but it has been designated as S3 since May 1995. Since December 2007, this line has been extended to Freimberg during working day peaks in the peak direction.

As part of the so-called Saxon-Franconian trunk line, Interregio-Express and InterCity services formerly ran on the Dresden–Werdau line at two or four-hour intervals, but since December 2006, the Franken-Sachsen-Express, running on the Dresden–Hof–Nuremberg has only had the quality of a regional service. These regional express trains operated hourly or two-hourly, depending on the timetable year. In December 2014 this service was replaced by an hourly, electrically-operated Regional-Express service on the Dresden–Hof route.

In addition, numerous Regionalbahn services, particularly between Dresden and Zwickau and between Chemnitz and Flöha (and continuing towards Pockau-Lengefeld and Annaberg-Buchholz).

Since 15 December 2013, the Werdau wye–Zwickau Hbf section has been served by lines S5 and S5X of the S-Bahn Mitteldeutschland.
