= List of railway stations in Chemnitz =

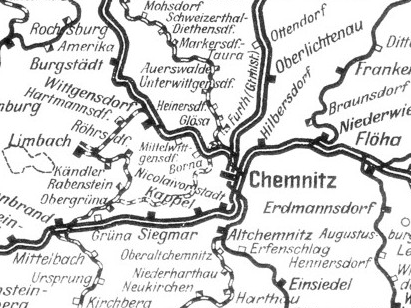
Railway network around Chemnitz in 1902.

The List of railway stations in Chemnitz covers all current, former or planned stations, halts and loading points in the current area of Chemnitz.

== Legend ==
The columns used in the table list the information explained below:

- Name: Name of the station according to the infrastructure register of DB Netz, former stations are sorted by their last name. Divergent names of the station operators (e.g. DB Station&Service) are listed small below.
- Type: Type of the station, former types are listed in italics with the year of the change, if known. Bf – Bahnhof (railway station), Bft – Bahnhofsteil (part of a station), Hp – Haltepunkt (halt), Anst – Anschlussstelle (industrial siding), Awanst – Ausweichanschlussstelle (refuge siding), Ldst – Ladestelle (loading point) (status: 2019)
- Position: Position of the station stating the mileage and the Saxon railway line abbreviation. CA – Chemnitz–Adorf railway, CO – Küchwald–Obergrüna railway, COB – Chemnitz-Altendorf–Chemnitz Beyerstraße railway, DW – Dresden–Werdau railway, DWCh – Chemnitz-Hilbersdorf–Chemnitz Hbf railway, KC – Neukieritzsch–Chemnitz railway, KCCh – Küchwald–Chemnitz-Hilbersdorf railway, LW – Limbach–Wittgensdorf railway, LWd – Limbach–Wüstenbrand railway, NW – Neuoelsnitz–Wüstenbrand railway, RC – Riesa–Chemnitz railway, RCCh – Abzw Chemnitz-Furth–Chemnitz-Hilbersdorf railway, WbC – Wechselburg–Küchwald railway, WbCF – Chemnitz-Glösa–Chemnitz-Furth railway, ZC – Zwönitz–Chemnitz Süd railway
- Code: Abbreviation of the station according to the Deutsche Bahn station codes.
- Platforms: Current or last number of tracks with platforms of the station. Stations without platforms were never intended for passenger traffic.
- Former names: Listing of station's former names and year of renaming; originally planned names below in italics.
- Opening: Date of station opening, possibly with distinction between freight and passenger traffic.
- Closure: Date of station closure, possibly with distinction between freight and passenger traffic.
- Image: Photo of the station.
- Grey highlighted stations are closed or planned.

== List ==
Name	Type	Position	Code	Platforms	Former names	Opening	Closure	Image
Chemnitz-Altendorf	Awanst until ? Bf	km 4.561 CO km 0.000 COB	DCA	—	until 1911 Chemnitz-Altendorf Güterbf until 1953 Chemnitz-Altendorf until 1990 Karl-Marx-Stadt-Altendorf	17 December 1903	28 May 2000	Station view (2016)
Bahnbetriebswerk/ Kosmonautenzentrum Hp	Hp	km 1.825 PEC		1	until ? Bahnbetriebswerk Hp	1998		
Chemnitz Beyerstraße	Awanst until ? Ldst	km 0.755 COB	—	—	until 1911 Beyerstraße Ladestelle	17 December 1903	? (assigned to Chemnitz-Altendorf station in 1937)	Location of the abandoned station (2016)
Chemnitz-Borna Hp	Hp	km 57.144 KC	DCBH	2	until 1903 Borna bei Chemnitz until 1911 Borna bei Chemnitz Haltepunkt until 1913 Borna b. Chemnitz Hp until 1953 Chemnitz-Borna Hp until 1990 Karl-Marx-Stadt-Borna Hp	15 July 1901		Platforms (2015)
Chemnitz-Borna Ldst	Ldst later Anst	km 1.85 CO	DCBO	—	until 1911 Borna bei Chemnitz Ladestelle until 1913 Borna b. Chemnitz Ldst until 1953 Chemnitz-Borna Ldst until 1990 Karl-Marx-Stadt-Borna Ldst	17 December 1903	25 June 1966	Goods shed (2016)
Chemnitz-Erfenschlag	Hp until 1992 Hp and Anst until 1933 Bf until 1908 Ldst	km 7.440 CA	DCE	1	until 1908 Erfenschlag Ladestelle until 1950 Erfenschlag until 1953 Chemnitz-Erfenschlag until 1990 Karl-Marx-Stadt-Erfenschlag	freight: 1 November 1905 passenger: 1 May 1908	freight: 15 March 1967	Platform (2016)
Chemnitz-Erfenschlag Ost	Hp	km 8.63 CA	DCEO	1	originally planned Chemnitz Kurt-Franke-Straße	29 January 2022		
Chemnitz Friedrichstraße	Hp	km 30.840 ZC	DC F	1		30 June 2006		Platform (2016)
Karl-Marx-Stadt-Furth	Bf until 1933 Ldst (today Anst of HKW Chemnitz-Nord)	km 1.358 WbCF	—	—	until 1911 Furth b. Chemnitz Ladestelle until 1913 Furth b. Chemnitz until 1953 Chemnitz-Furth	1 July 1902	1 June 1962	Station view (2016)
Chemnitz-Glösa	Bf	km 21.708 WbC km 0.000 WbCF	DCG	3	until 1950 Glösa until 1953 Chemnitz-Glösa until 1990 Karl-Marx-Stadt-Glösa	freight: 1 September 1902 passenger: 1 September 1902	freight: 1997 passenger: 24 May 1998	Station building (2016)
Chemnitz-Harthau	Hp until 1995 Hp and Anst until 1933 Bf	km 31.445 ZC	DCHA	1	until 1911 Harthau i. Erzgeb until 1933 Harthau b. Chemnitz until 1950 Harthau (b Chemnitz) until 1953 Chemnitz-Harthau until 1990 Karl-Marx-Stadt-Harthau	freight: 1 October 1895 passenger: 1 October 1895	freight: 31 January 1969	Platform (2009)
Chemnitz Hbf	Bf	km 79.717 DW km −0.118 CA km 61.731 KC km 65.784 RC	DC	14	until 1904 Chemnitz until 1911 Chemnitz Hauptbahnhof until 1953 Chemnitz Hbf until 1990 Karl-Marx-Stadt Hbf	freight: 1 September 1852 passenger: 1 September 1852	freight: 1996	Station building (2009)
Außenbf Chemnitz Hbf	Bft	km 2.200 DWCh		—	until 1990 Außenbf Karl-Marx-Stadt Hbf	presumably 1909		
Karl-Marx-Stadt-Heinersdorf	Hp	km 20.045 WbC	—	1	until 1904 Heinersdorf bei Chemnitz until 1951 Heinersdorf-Draisdorf until 1953 Chemnitz-Heinersdorf	1 September 1902	18 July 1977	Location of the razed halt (2016)
Chemnitz-Hilbersdorf	Bf until 1902 Ldst	km 76.619 DW km 2.472 RCCh	DCH	—	until 1904 Hilbersdorf until 1953 Chemnitz-Hilbersdorf until 1990 Karl-Marx-Stadt-Hilbersdorf	1 January 1899	1997	
Chemnitz-Hilbersdorf Hp; Chemnitz-Hilbersdorf	Hp	km 0.491 DWCh	DCHP	2	until 1904 Hilbersdorf until 1953 Chemnitz-Hilbersdorf until 1990 Karl-Marx-Stadt-Hilbersdorf	15 August 1893		Station building (2014)
Chemnitz-Hilbersdorf Museumsbahnsteig	Hp	km 75.65 DW		1		?		Platform (2015)
Chemnitz-Kappel	Bf	km 83.480 DW	DCK	—	until 1882 Chemnitz Kohlenbahnhof until 1904 Kappel i. Sachsen until 1911 Chemnitz-Kappel (Güterbf) until 1953 Chemnitz-Kappel until 1990 Karl-Marx-Stadt-Kappel	1 June 1880	1997	
Chemnitz-Kappel Umschlagbf	Bft	≈ km 83.8 DW	DCKC	—	?	2 December 1968	1998	Container terminal (1982)
Chemnitz Kinderwaldstätte	Hp	km 59.778 RC	DCKI	2	until 1934 Kinderwaldstätte Chemnitz until 1953 Chemnitz Kinderwaldstätte until 1990 Karl-Marx-Stadt Kinderwaldstätte	1 October 1911		Platforms (2016)
Chemnitz Küchwald	Bf	km 58.554 KC km 0.000 KCCh km 0.000 CO km 23.795 WbC	DKW	1	until ? Küchwald Zweigstelle until 1928 Küchwald until ? Vorbf Küchwald until 2018 Küchwald	freight: 2 June 1902 passenger: 5 December 2018		Station view (2016)
Bahnhof Küchwaldwiese	Bf	km 0.0 PEC km 2.3 PEC	DCPEK	2	until 1979 Pionierbahnhof Neues Leben until 1990 Pionierbahnhof Freundschaft	1954		Station building (2015)
Karl-Marx-Stadt Markersdorfer Straße	Hp	km 34.275 ZC	—	1	until 1905 Oberaltchemnitz until 1953 Altchemnitz	1 October 1895	15 September 1977	Location of the razed halt (2016)
Chemnitz Mitte	Hp until 1905 Bf until 1900 Hp	km 82.848 DW	DCM	2	until 1904 Nicolaivorstadt Chemnitz until 1905 Chemnitz Nicolaibahnhof until 1953 Chemnitz Nicolaivorstadt until 1990 Karl-Marx-Stadt Mitte	passenger: 9 January 1860	17 March 2021	Station building (2016)
Chemnitz Mitte	Hp	km 82.58 DW		2		22 March 2021		
Chemnitz-Rabenstein	Ldst until 1950 Hp and Anst until 1933 Bf	km 6.89 LWd	—	1	until 1939 Rabenstein until 1950 Rabenstein (Sachs)	freight: 1 December 1897 passenger: 1 December 1897	freight: 1953 passenger: 30 December 1950	Location of the razed station (2016)
Chemnitz-Reichenhain	Hp	km 6.060 CA	DCRE	2	until 1905 Erfenschlag until 1908 Erfenschlag Hp until 1953 Chemnitz-Reichenhain originally planned Chemnitz Wasserwerk until 1990 Karl-Marx-Stadt-Reichenhain	1 October 1877		Platform (2016)
Chemnitz Riemenschneiderstraße	Hp	km 32.433 ZC	DCHAR	1		15 December 2002		Platform (2016)
Chemnitz-Rottluff	Anst until ? Ldst	km 6.192 CO	DCRL	—	until 1911 Rottluff Ladestelle until 1926 Rottluff until 1953 Chemnitz-Rottluff until 1990 Karl-Marx-Stadt-Rottluff	17 December 1903	1 January 1998	Location of the razed station (2016)
Chemnitz-Schönau	Hp	km 85.593 DW	DCC	2	until 1950 Wanderer-Werke until 1953 Chemnitz Wanderer-Werke until 1990 Karl-Marx-Stadt-Schönau	26 November 1940		Platforms (2014)
Chemnitz-Siegmar	Bf	km 87.987 DW	DCSI	2	until 1936 Siegmar until 1950 Siegmar-Schönau until 1953 Chemnitz-Siegmar until 1990 Karl-Marx-Stadt-Siegmar	freight: 15 November 1858 passenger: 15 November 1858	freight: 1969	Station building (2009)
Chemnitz Stadtpark	Hp	km 34.708 ZC	DCST	1	until 1976 Karl-Marx-Stadt Scheffelstraße until 1990 Karl-Marx-Stadt Stadtpark	27 December 1972	10 June 2001	Platform (2016)
Chemnitz Süd	Bf	km 1.990 CA km 37.963 ZC	DCS	2	until 1905 Altchemnitz until 1911 Chemnitz Südbahnhof until 1953 Chemnitz Süd until 1990 Karl-Marx-Stadt Süd	freight: 15 November 1875 passenger: 15. November 1875		Station building (2011)
Chemnitz Süd Hp; Chemnitz Süd	Hp	km 81.825 DW	DCD	2	until 1911 Chemnitz Südbahnhof until 1953 Chemnitz Süd until 1990 Karl-Marx-Stadt Süd	1 October 1908		Platform (2014)
Technikmuseum Seilablaufanlage	Hp	≈ km 76.7 DW		1		September 2014		Platform (2020)
Tennisplätze Hp	Hp	km 1.14 PEC	DCPET	1		1992		Platform (2015)
platform of „Wilhelm Pieck“ repair shop	Hp	Raw „Wilhelm Pieck“		1		?	?	
Chemnitz Zwönitzbrücke	Bf	km 33.230 ZC	DCZW	2	until 1905 Niederharthau until 1953 Oberaltchemnitz until 1990 Karl-Marx-Stadt Zwönitzbrücke	freight: 1 October 1895 passenger: 1 October 1895	freight: 31 January 1969 passenger: 10 June 2001	Platform (on the left, 2016)
Einsiedel	Bf	km 10.379 CA	DED	2	until 1940 Einsiedel until 1953 Einsiedel (b Chemnitz)	freight: 15 November 1875 passenger: 15 November 1875	freight: 1 April 1972	Station building and platform (2016)
Einsiedel August-Bebel-Platz	Hp	km 11.10 CA	DEDP	1		29 January 2022		
Einsiedel Brauerei	Hp	km 11.376 CA	DEDB	1		25 May 2006	?	Location of the razed halt (2016)
Einsiedel Brauerei	Hp	km 11.4 CA	DEDB	1		29 January 2022		
Einsiedel Gymnasium	Hp	km 9.040 CA	DEDH	1		18 December 2003	2018	Platform (2016)
Einsiedel Gymnasium; Einsiedel Hp Gymnasium	Hp	km 9.395 CA	DEDH	1		29 January 2022		
Einsiedel Hp	Hp	km 8.91 CA	DEDH	1	until 1994 Einsiedel Betriebsberufsschule	30 September 1972	1 June 2003	
Grüna (Sachs); Grüna (Sachs) Hp	Hp	km 91.240 DW	DGN	2	until 1910 Grüna until 1911 Grüna (Sachsen) Hp until 1933 Grüna (Sa.) Hp	15 November 1858		Platforms (2016)
Grüna (Sachs) ob Bf	Ldst until 1963 Bf	km 9.81 LWd	—	1	until 1910 Obergrüna until 1911 Grüna (Sachsen) ob Bf until 1933 Grüna (Sa.) ob Bf	freight: 1 December 1897 passenger: 1 December 1897	freight: 20 March 1968 passenger: 30 December 1950	Station building (2016)
Klaffenbach Hp	Hp	km 29.540 ZC	DNK K	1		15 December 2002		Platform (2016)
Mittelbach	Hp	km 10.083 NW	DMIT	1		1 May 1896	11 August 1990	Location of the razed halt (2016)
Neukirchen-Klaffenbach	Bf	km 28.810 ZC	DNK	2	until 1903 Neukirchen i. Erzgeb	freight: 1 October 1895 passenger: 1 October 1895	freight: 2000	Station building (2016)
Niederrabenstein	Anst until ? Ldst	km 9.051 CO	—	—	until 1911 Niederrabenstein Ladestelle	17 December 1903	20 February 1968	Location of the razed station (2016)
Röhrsdorf	Ldst until 1950 Hp and Anst until 1933 Bf	km 3.17 LWd	—	1	until 1911 Röhrsdorf bei Chemnitz until 1933 Röhrsdorf b. Chemnitz until 1953 Röhrsdorf (b Chemnitz)	freight: 1 December 1897 passenger: 1 December 1897	freight: 1 February 1962 passenger: 30 December 1950	Location of the razed station (2016)
Wittgensdorf Mitte	Hp	km 54.343 KC	DWIM	2	until 1898 Bahrmühle until 1927 Mittelwittgensdorf	8 April 1872		Station building and platform (2016)
Wittgensdorf ob Bf	Bf	km 51.589 KC km 6.680 LW	DWIO	2	until 1927 Wittgensdorf	freight: 8 April 1872 passenger: 8 April 1872	freight: 1995	Station building and platform (2015)
Wittgensdorf unt Bf	Hp until 1967 Hp and Anst until ? Bf	km 18.710 WbC	DWIU	1	until 1927 Unterwittgensdorf	freight: 1 September 1902 passenger: 1 September 1902	freight: 13 September 1965 passenger: 24 May 1998	Station building (2016)

== See also ==
- List of railway stations in Saxony
