= Küchwald =

Küchwald stands for:

- a park and forest in Chemnitz, see Küchwald-Park
- a freight station in Chemnitz, see Küchwald railway station
- the Parkeisenbahn Chemnitz, also called "Parkeisenbahn Küchwald"
- a station of the Parkeisenbahn, actually Küchwaldwiese
