= DKW (disambiguation) =

DKW was a German car and motorcycle marque, now Audi.

DKW may also refer to:

- Chemnitz Küchwald station, railway station in Chemnitz, Germany
- Dvoretzky–Kiefer–Wolfowitz inequality, statistical inequality
