= Chemnitz Küchwald/Abzw Chemnitz-Furth–Chemnitz-Hilbersdorf railway =

Former freight railway lines in Saxony, Germany

Chemnitz Küchwald–Chemnitz-Hilbersdorf
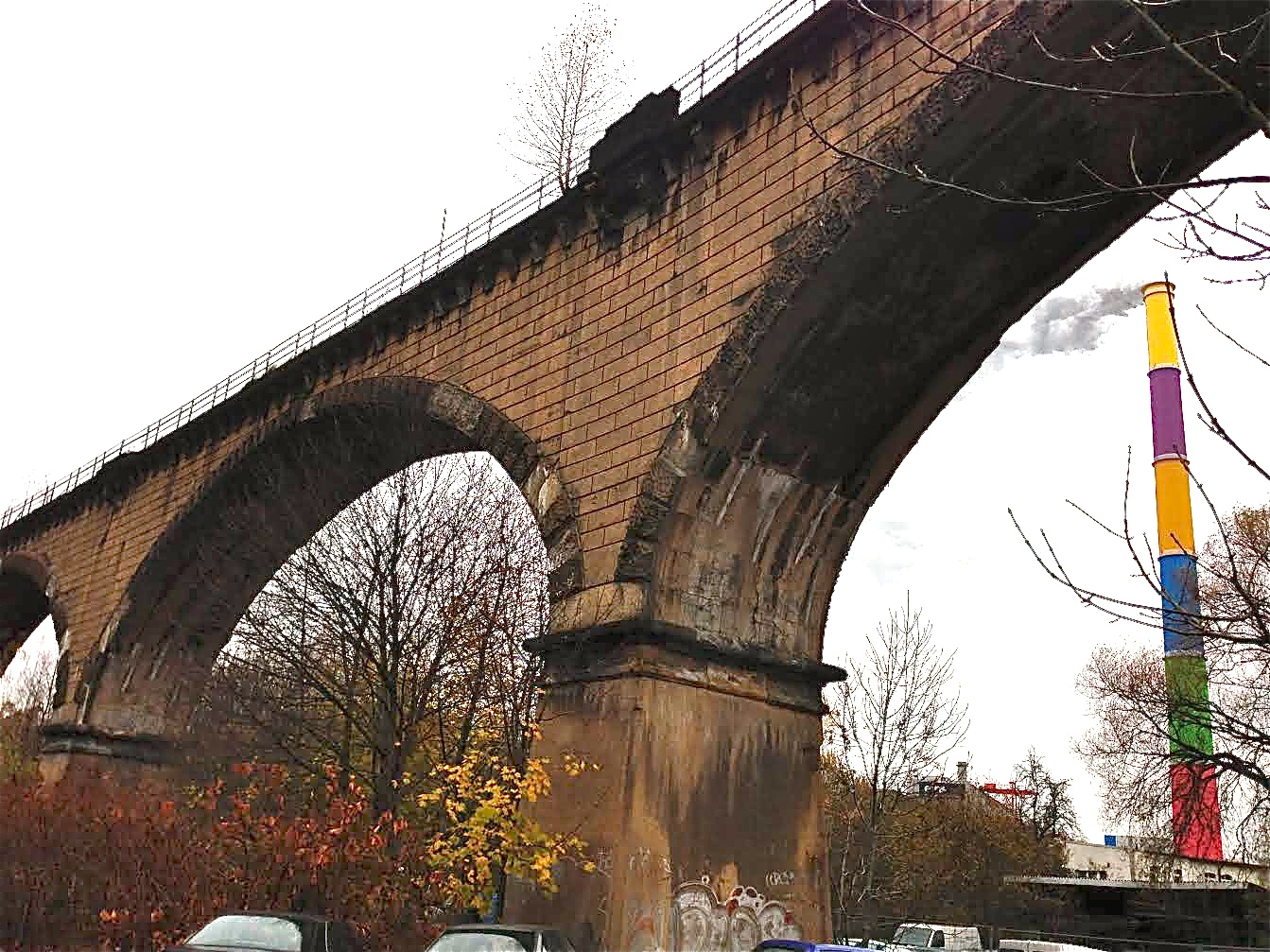
- The former railway viaduct of KCCh line across Chemnitz river in 2013, then already being unused for 14 years

Overview
- Line number: 6263; Saxon KCCh
- Locale: Chemnitz, Saxony, Germany

Technical
- Line length: 1.578 km
- Number of tracks: 1
- Track gauge: 1,435 mm (standard gauge)

Abzw Chemnitz-Furth–Chemnitz-Hilbersdorf

Overview
- Line number: 6262; Saxon RCCh
- Locale: Chemnitz, Saxony, Germany

Technical
- Line length: 2.6 km
- Number of tracks: 1 (2 June 1902 to 1945: 2)
- Track gauge: 1,435 mm (standard gauge)
- Electrification: 15 kV/16.7 Hz AC overhead catenary

The Chemnitz Küchwald/Abzw Chemnitz-Furth–Chemnitz-Hilbersdorf railway used to be two short freight lines on which freight trains from Geithain and Leipzig, from Wechselburg and from Obergrüna (KCCh branching off at Chemnitz Küchwald) as well as from Riesa and Döbeln (RCCh branching off at Chemnitz-Furth) could bypass Chemnitz main station and get directly to Chemnitz-Hilbersdorf goods station.

== History ==
Both lines were opened on 2 June 1902 along with the Chemnitz-Hilbersdorf goods station. The RCCh line was double-tracked between Abzw Chemnitz-Furth and Chemnitz-Hilbersdorf Stw 5 from 1902 until 1945.

The Hilbersdorf goods station was closed on 1 January 1999, so that traffic on both lines was discontinued on 31 August 1999. The tracks were dismantled some years later (e.g. 2002 the junctions in Furth). In spring 2009, the Raw-Bridge was demolished; the Chemnitz valley viaduct does still exist today.

== Route ==
The KCCh line left Chemnitz Küchwald railway station (until December 2018 Küchwald freight yard) across the Chemnitz valley viaduct and united, after it crossed the disused tunnel to the formerly planned mail station, with the RCCh line, which came from Abzw Chemnitz-Furth on the Riesa–Chemnitz railway and did also cross the "post track tunnel" and some bridges before. The united line continued to the Werkstättenviadukt ("Workshops viaduct", also called "Raw-Bridge") and merged at signal box 5 into the Chemnitz-Hilbersdorf station.
