= Chemnitz Küchwald station =

Railway station in Chemnitz, Germany

Chemnitz Küchwald
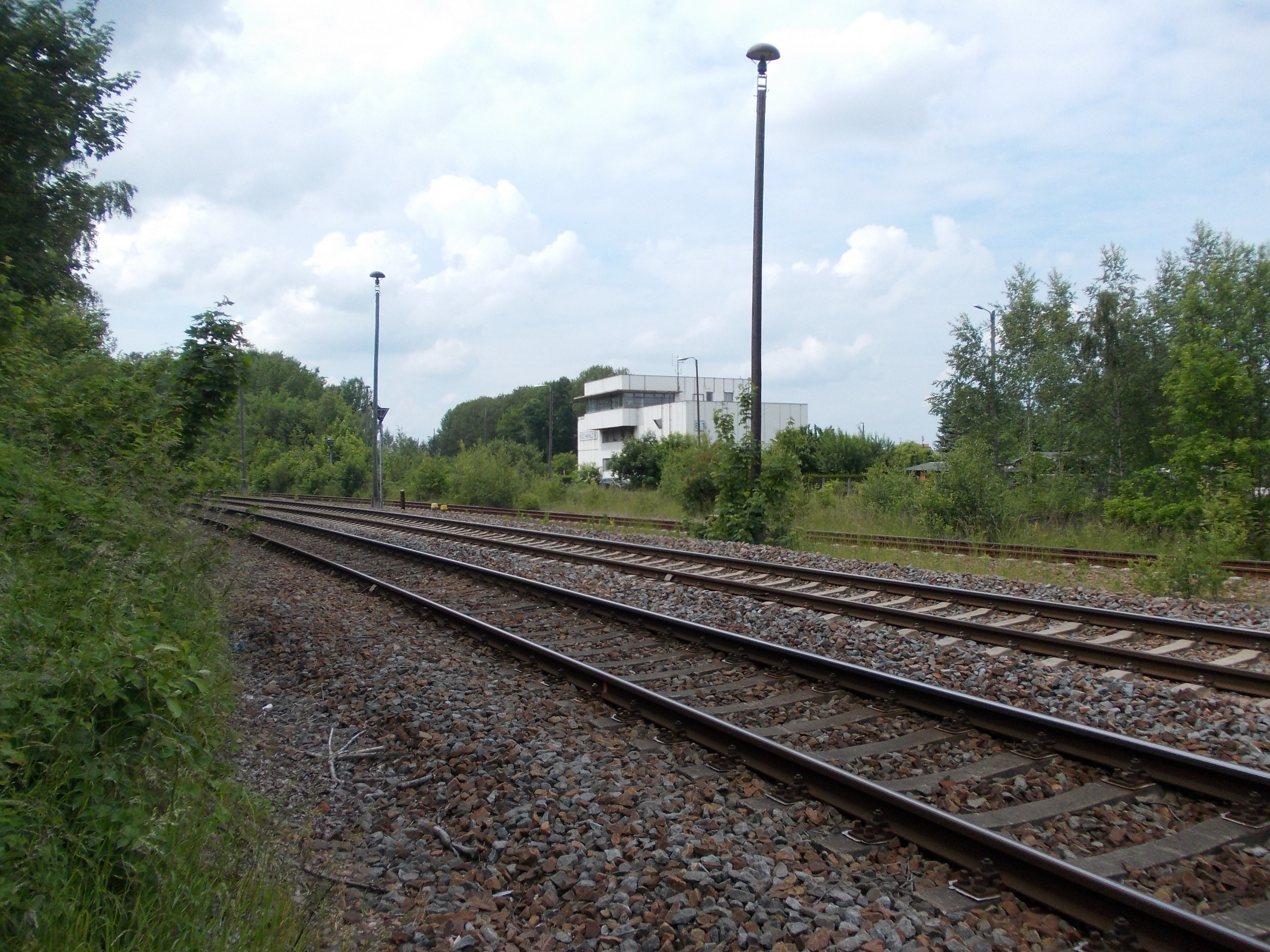
- Neukieritzsch–Chemnitz railway with station in background

General information
- Location: Chemnitz-Furth, Saxony; Germany
- Coordinates: 50.855684°N 12.912379°E
- Owner: Deutsche Bahn
- Operator: DB Netz; DB Station&Service
- Lines: Neukieritzsch–Chemnitz (km 58.570); Wechselburg–Küchwald (km 23.796); formerly Küchwald–Obergrüna (km 0.00); frm. Küchwald–C-Hilbersdorf (km 0.00)
- Platforms: 1
- Tracks: about 18
- Train operators: DB Cargo, Heavy Haul Power International, Havelländische Eisenbahn, AHG Industry, Mitteldeutsche Eisenbahn, City-Bahn Chemnitz

Other information
- Station code: n/a
- DS100 code: DKW
- IBNR: 8017050
- Category: 6
- Website: http://bahnland-sachsen.de.tl/G.ue.terbahnhof-K.ue.chwald.htm, https://www.sachsenschiene.net/bahn/sta/sta0451.htm

History
- Opened: 2 June 1902

Services
Preceding station	City-Bahn Chemnitz	Following station
Chemnitz Hbf towards Aue (Sachs)	C13	Chemnitz-Borna Hp towards Burgstädt
Location

Chemnitz Küchwald station (until December 2018 Küchwald) is located in the district of Furth in Chemnitz, Saxony, Germany on the Neukieritzsch–Chemnitz railway. It is an important station to supply the Chemnitz Nord co-generation power station with fuels.

== History ==
The station was opened in 1902. Here the Wechselburg–Küchwald railway, the Küchwald–Obergrüna railway and the line to Hilbersdorf marshalling yard branched off. The line to Obergrüna was closed in 2004, the line to Wechselburg in 2002.

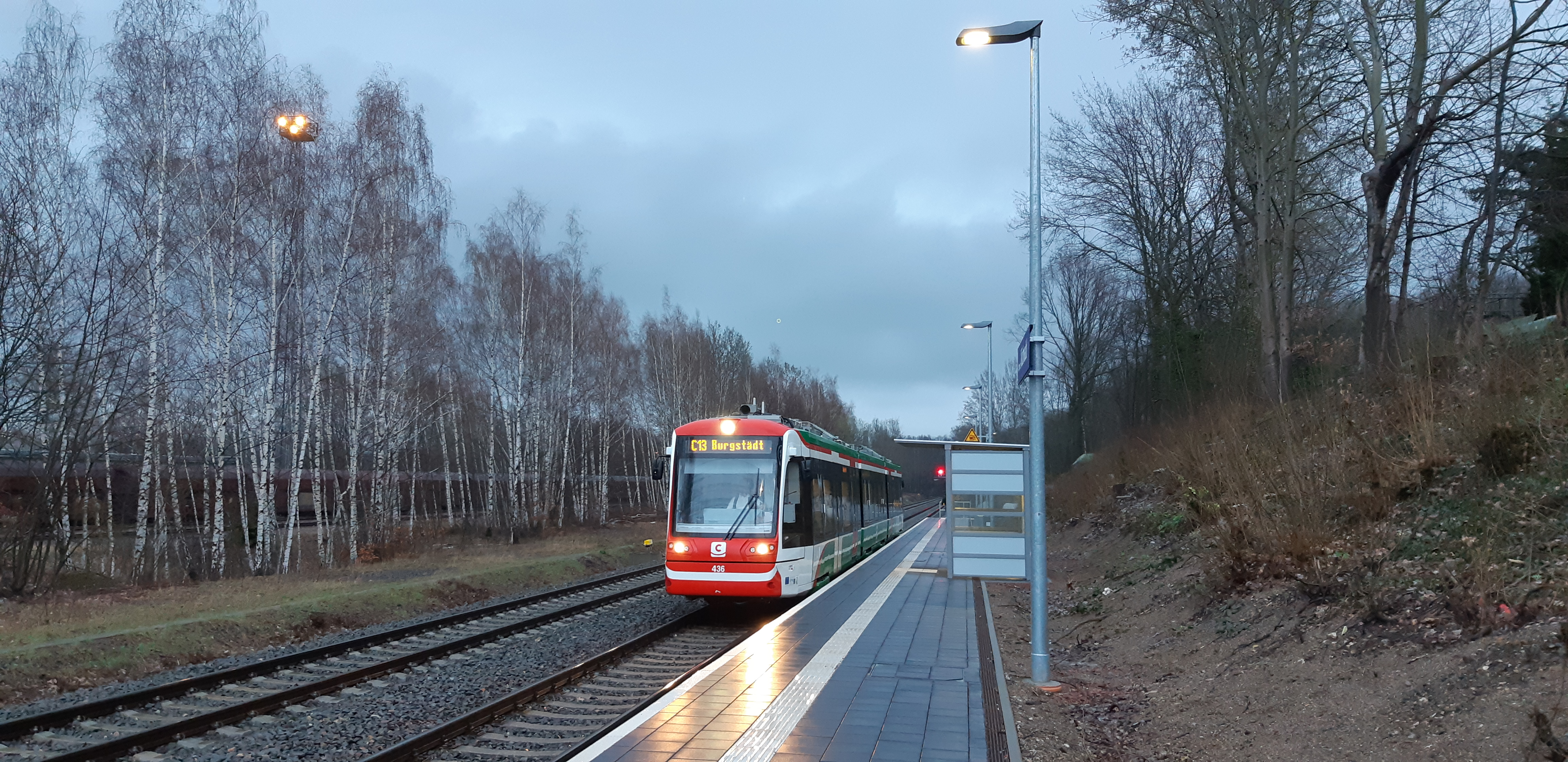
Stadler Citylink of City-Bahn Chemnitz towards Burgstädt at the newly opened platform in late March 2019

The station has always been passed by passenger trains as there were no platforms until late 2018. A platform for passenger transport was commissioned an 5 December 2018. The platform is located on the right and used for passenger trains in both directions.

== Operation ==
The station is destination for coal, lime, mineral oil and empty gypsum trains. After their arrival they will be separated and shunted to the station of the power plant in Furth by shunters of DB Class V60, DR Class V60 and DR Class V 23.
