= Neukieritzsch–Chemnitz railway =

Railway line in Germany

Neukieritzsch–Chemnitz Hbf
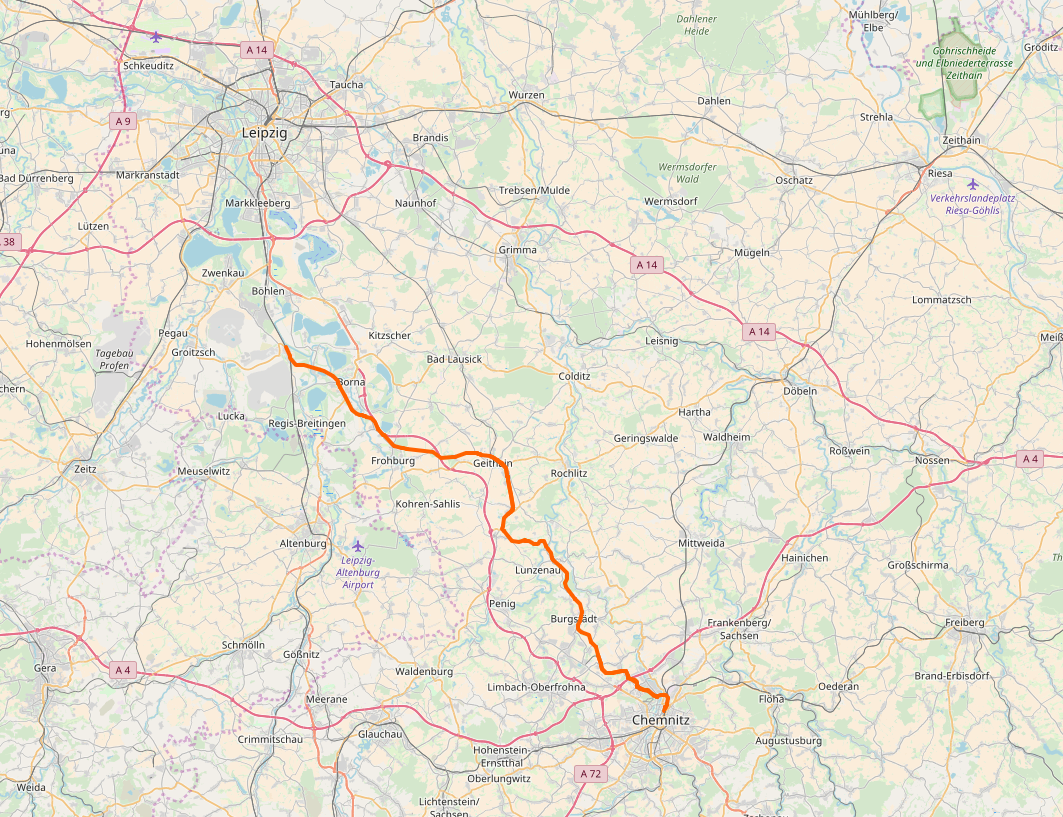

Overview
- Line number: 6385
- Locale: Saxony, Germany

Service
- Route number: 527, 525

Technical
- Line length: 61.32 km (38.10 mi)
- Number of tracks: 2: Neukieritzsch–Borna; Geithain–Narsdorf; Wittgensdorf ob Bf–Küchwald
- Track gauge: 1,435 mm (4 ft 8 1/2 in) standard gauge
- Minimum radius: 300 m (980 ft)
- Electrification: 15 kV/16.7 Hz AC overhead catenary (Neukieritzsch–Geithain)
- Operating speed: 160 km/h (99.4 mph)
- Maximum incline: 1.0%

The Neukieritzsch–Chemnitz railway is a line in the German state of Saxony. It branches in Neukieritzsch from the Leipzig–Hof railway and runs via Borna and Geithain to Chemnitz Main station. It is part of a long-distance connection between Leipzig and Chemnitz. The route is electrified between Neukieritzsch and Geithain.

== History ==
As early as 1860 a railway committee had been established to promote a direct link between Leipzig and Chemnitz. Initial plans called for an alignment from Kieritzsch (now Neukieritzsch) on the Saxon-Bavarian Railway (German: Sächsisch-Bayerischen Eisenbahn) to Mittweida on the Riesa–Chemnitz line. Above all, the city of Borna vehemently demanded a rail connection. As these plans were rejected by the Saxon government, the town of Borna proposed the construction of the Kieritzsch–Borna route at its own expense in 1864. This was authorised, although the management of operations was reserved for the state. In October 1865, construction began and was completed on 14 January 1867, having been delayed by the War of 1866.

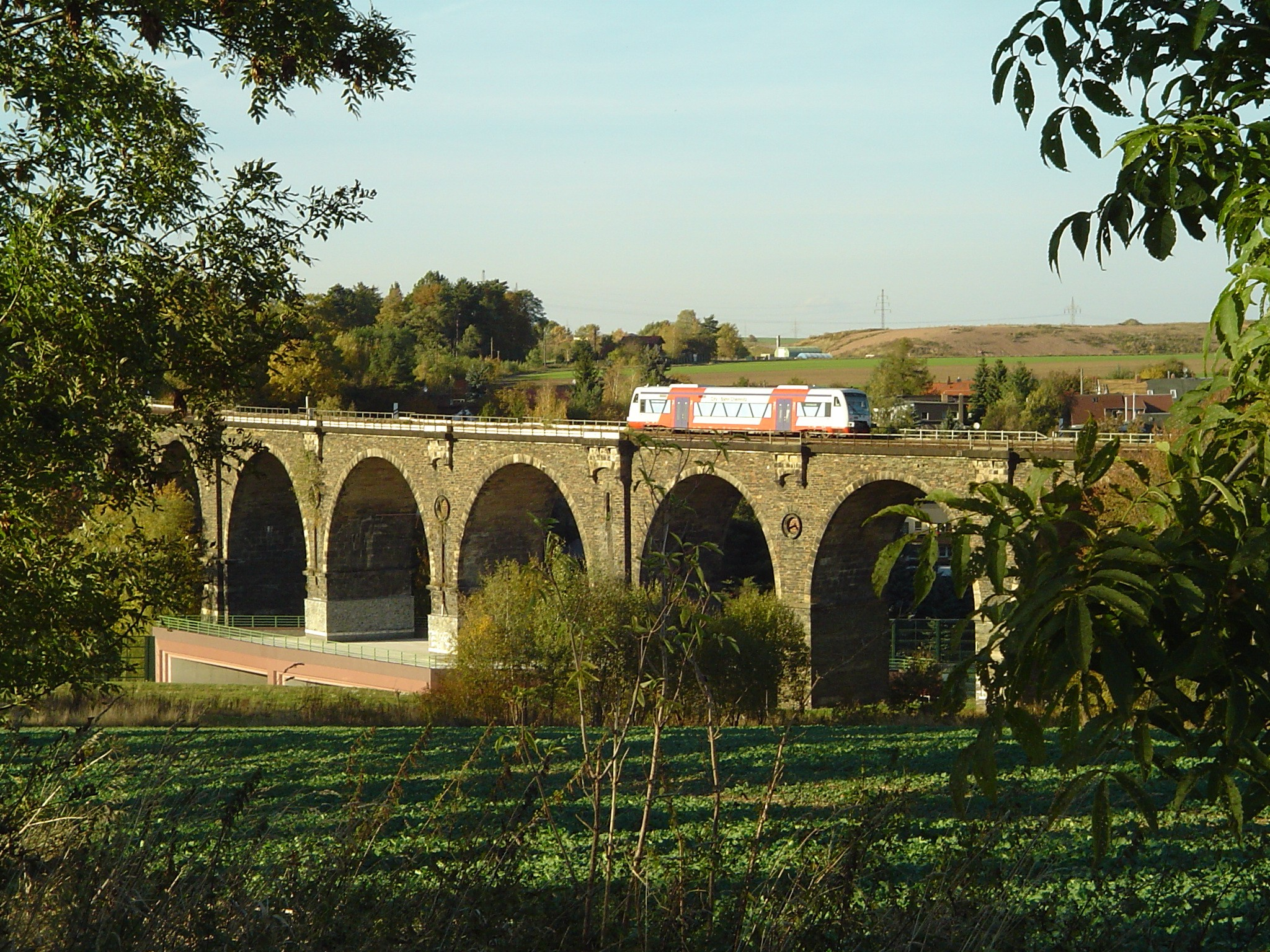
Bahrebachmühle Viaduct with a RS1 unit of City-Bahn Chemnitz over the A 4 in 2006

The Saxon government favoured further construction towards Chemnitz to be carried out with private finance, but there was no candidate who was willing to provide the necessary funds for the expensive construction of the proposed line. Ultimately, the Saxon parliament decided to build the line at the expense of the state. There was still a long controversy surrounding the planned route. For a long time the favourite was a direct connection from Leipzig to Geithain. Ultimately, it was decided for reasons of cost to take the route from Borna via Geithain and Burgstädt to Chemnitz. Branch lines would also be built to Limbach, Penig and Rochlitz.

In the spring of 1869, work began on the track. The creation of several large viaducts was necessary in Göhren, Burgstädt and Chemnitz. On 8 April 1872, operations started on the new line. It was opened together with the branch lines to Limbach, Penig and Rochlitz. The Kieritzsch–Borna city railway passed into state ownership on 1 October 1870, so that there was now a continuous state railway between Leipzig and Chemnitz.

=== Since 1945 ===
In 1945, the second track was completely dismantled for war reparations to the Soviet Union, but the sections between Neukieritzsch and Borna and between Wittgensdorf and Chemnitz-Küchwald were later rebuilt. On 15 January 1962, Deutsche Reichsbahn inaugurated electric traction between Neukieritzsch and Borna.

With the renovation and upgrading of the Chemnitz–Leipzig line (including the Leipzig–Geithain line via Bad Lausick) the second track was re-established between Geithain and Narsdorf on 11 December 2005. Services at Cossen station were abandoned at the same time.

Since the completion of the work, RE 6 (Chemnitz-Leipzig-Express) services, connecting Chemnitz and Leipzig, have run on the line at hourly intervals. The RE 6 services take only 26 minutes from Geithain to Chemnitz, compared to 39 minutes before 2005. The upgrade of the line also prepared it for the operation of tilting trains, although using tilting technology alone would only reduce running time by three and a half minutes. An additional crossing loop increases the reduction in running time to seven minutes. The tilting technology was used to shorten travel times between 10 December 2006 and 22 October 2009. The trains left Leipzig at 33 minutes past the hour and arrived there at 27 minutes past. After the occurrence of a malfunction on a class 612 set, the tilt system had to be taken out of service on all vehicles of the class for a time. A replacement timetable was introduced with longer travel times between Chemnitz and Leipzig, which remained in force until the end of 2015. Since then the trains have departed Leipzig at 26 minutes past and arrived at 33 minutes past the hour. Until 2011, DB also operated the RE 28 service as a round trip on the Leipzig–Chemnitz–Cranzahl route on Saturdays and Sundays.

The section from Borna to Geithain was electrified in the summer of 2010, so the former MRB 2/70 local service operating from Leipzig via Borna to Geithain could be replaced with the opening in December 2013 of the Leipzig City Tunnel, which can only be operated with electric trains, by S-Bahn-Linie S4 of the network of the S-Bahn Mitteldeutschland. A new electronic interlocking was installed in Frohburg at a total cost of €8 million. From 15 December 2013 used the line S4 of the new network of the S-Bahn Mitteldeutschland The section between Neukieritzsch and Geithain has been operated as line S3 since 13 December 2015. The Geithain–Chemnitz section has been operated by Transdev Regio Ost with locomotive-hauled carriages under the brand name of Mitteldeutsche Regiobahn since the timetable change in December 2015. In addition to this, the Burgstädt–Chemnitz section has been operated by City-Bahn Chemnitz under the Chemnitz Model with diesel multiple units as line C13 since December 2015.

== Outlook ==
In 2008 and 2009, a study was established by the TU Dresden to investigate how the line could be upgraded to carry long-distance traffic in addition to the existing local passenger services. The result of the study was that the line had to be continuously (or nearly continuously) upgraded to two tracks and electrified throughout to allow the operation of fast trains (such as electrical ICE Ts). At the beginning of 2009, the then Saxon transport minister Thomas Jurk, announced funding for the preliminary planning of the upgrade of the line.

At the end of January 2012, representatives of the Saxon State Ministry of Economic Affairs, Labour and Transport proposed the closure of the gap in the electrification between Geithain and Chemnitz. Under this proposal, the preliminary planning would have been completed by 2013. Construction would have begun in 2015/16, with a construction period of three years. This would have allowed Chemnitz to be connected to the S-Bahn Mitteldeutschland network. The cost of closing this approximately 36 km-long electrification gap was estimated at more than €100 million. A completion of the second track of the route from Neukieritzsch via Borna to Chemnitz was planned as a further stage.

At the beginning of January 2013, representatives of the state of Saxony and Deutsche Bahn AG signed a contract for the preliminary selection of options for the upgrade and electrification of the Chemnitz–Leipzig line. This would involve the investigation of a route upgrade via Bad Lausick as well as via Borna. As a result of the preliminary investigation, the route via Bad Lausick (and thus including the Leipzig–Geithain railway) was selected as the preferred option. The main advantages of this option were a travel time of 50 minutes and convenient connections for passengers to the other long-distance lines in Leipzig Hauptbahnhof. In July 2013, the State of Saxony and Deutsche Bahn signed a planning agreement for the further upgrade and the electrification of the Leipzig–Chemnitz railway. The Free State of Saxony provided funding of around €2.4 million for this purpose. The preliminary planning was completed in the summer of 2014 and presented to the public in August 2014. On the Neukieritzsch–Chemnitz line there would be, in addition to the completion of electrification, adaptions to the track layouts in the stations of Geithain, Narsdorf, Burgstädt and Chemnitz-Küchwald. According to media reports, commissioning is expected at the earliest after eight years. The State of Saxony intends to commission the other projects in a timely manner and to finance them on a pro rata basis. The project was nominated for the Federal Transport Plan (Bundesverkehrswegeplan) 2030.

== Route description ==
=== Course ===
The line runs parallel to federal road 176 as far as Borna and from Neukirchen to Niedergräfenhain it follows federal road 72. The catenary ends in Geithain station and only the bay platform for trains to and from Neukieritzsch is electrified. After Geithain, the line reaches the central Saxon loess hill country (Mittelsächsisches Lösshügelland) and meets the closed Rochlitz–Penig railway in Narsdorf. After passing the village of Göhren it crosses the Zwickau Mulde together with the Glauchau–Wurzen railway (Mulde Valley Railway—Muldentalbahn) on the Göhren Viaduct. Near Stein the line comes within 600 metres of the valley of the Chemnitz and the closed Wechselburg–Küchwald railway (Chemnitz Valley Railway—Chemnitztalbahn). An extended urban viaduct reaches Burgstädt station, which is located on the eastern edge of the town. After the former junction with the closed line from Limbach-Oberfrohna, the highest point of the line is reached at the station of Wittgensdorf ob Bf (upper station). From there it runs with a maximum gradient of 1:100 in the floodplain of the Chemnitz, where it crosses autobahn 4 on the Bahrebachmühlen Viaduct (Bahrebachmühlenviadukt). After crossing the industrial railway from Grüna, it meets the track to Küchwald freight yard at exactly the same point as the closed Wechselburg–Küchwald railway, which ran largely parallel towards Wechselburg. After a long right turn, the line converges with the tracks from Riesa and from Dresden on the approaches to Chemnitz Hauptbahnhof.

=== Stations ===
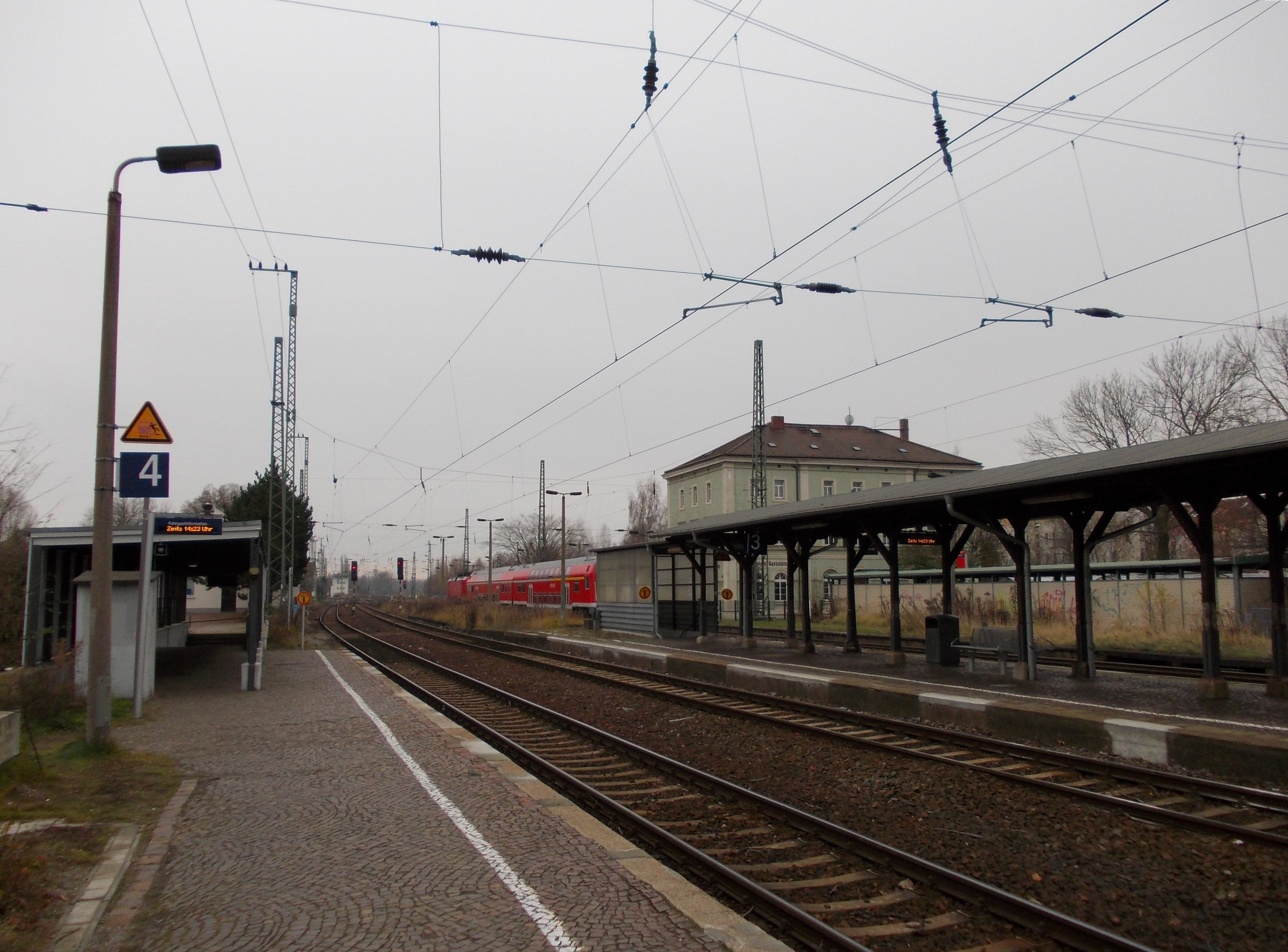
Neukieritzsch station

Neukieritzsch (51°09′02″N 12°24′46″E)

Neukieritzsch station (only Kieritzsch until 3 October 1936) was opened in 1842 together with the Leipzig–Altenburg section of the Leipzig–Hof railway, although the first tracks had been laid in 1841. A railway settlement developed in its immediate vicinity, since the village of Kieritzsch that the station was named after was about 3 km away. The new settlement was eventually named Neukieritzsch (New Kieritzsch). The station was in the vicinity of Kahnsdorf and Pürsten, but both villages rejected the naming of the station after their community. Already at the opening of the station, maintenance facilities were available in Kieritzsch and as a result of the opening of the lines to Borna and to Pegau (opened in 1909), the station developed into a small railway junction during the following decades.

A dense network of factories developed around the station as a result of brown coal (lignite) mining. After 1945, traffic continued to increase, especially freight traffic, so the station had to be extensively expanded. Meanwhile, the station has been dismantled except for a few tracks.

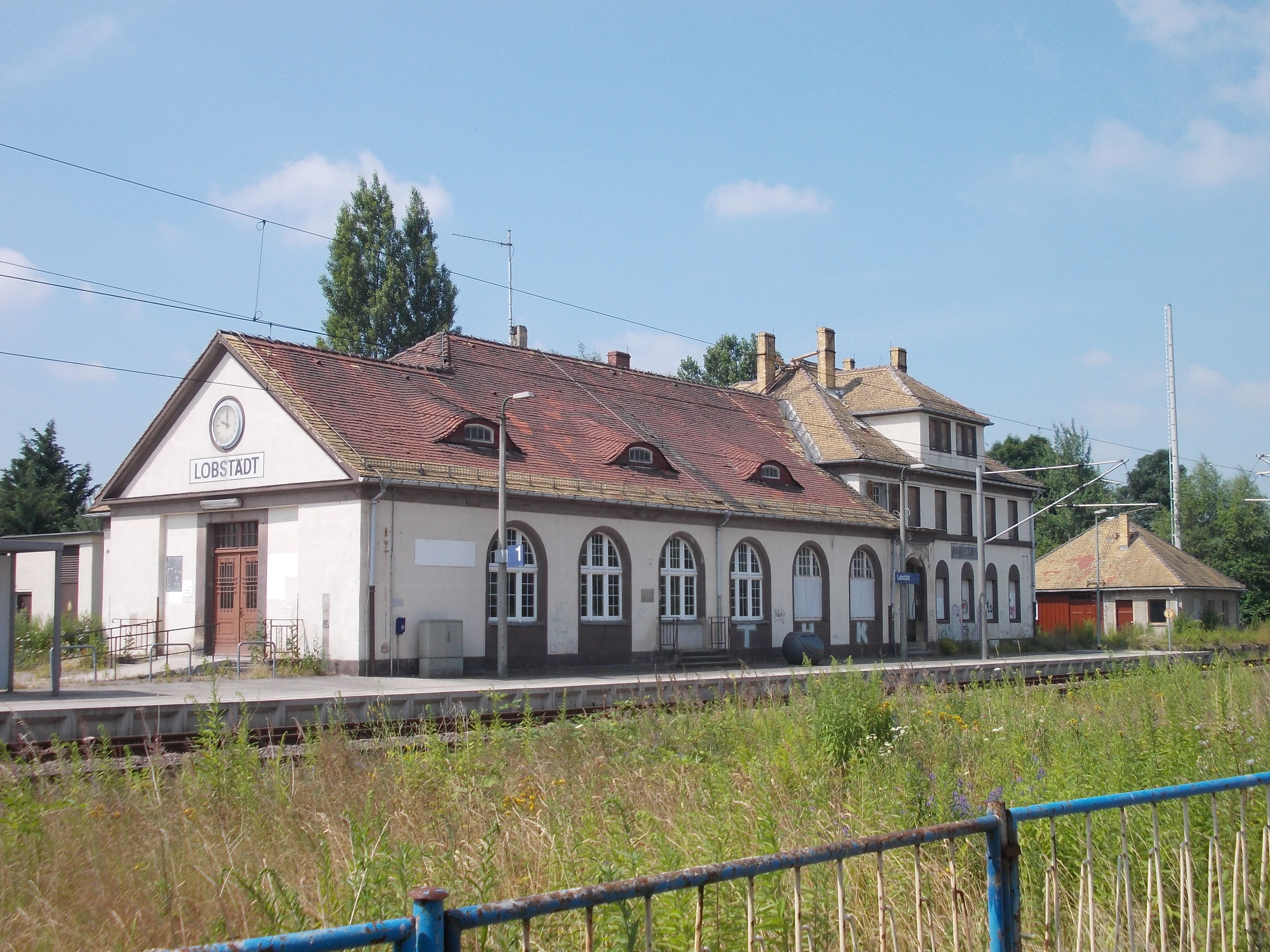
Lobstädt station

Lobstädt (51°08′09″N 12°26′57″E)

The station was originally opened as a halt (Haltestelle) of Lobstädt on the private Kieritzsch–Borna railway, but was later expanded several times. It was reclassified as a station on 1 May 1905. The station gained greater importance as a result of the brown coal mining, as there were several briquette factories in Lobstädt.

Already in the 1980s, the volume of traffic had declined somewhat, but a major slump occurred in the 1990s, when all the briquette factories were closed. On 9 September 1999, Lobstädt was therefore reclassified as a halt.

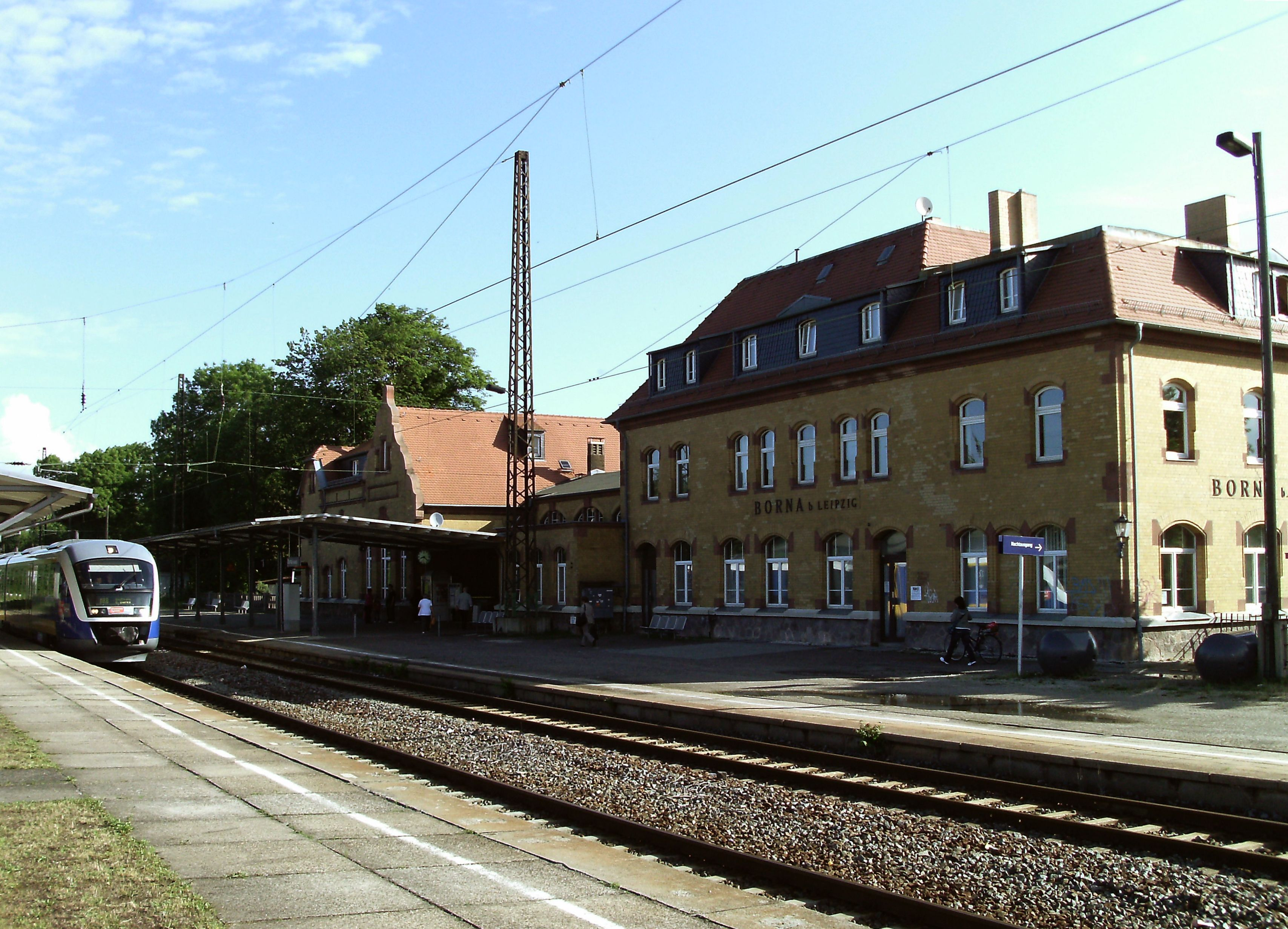
New Borna station, 2012

Borna (b Leipzig) (51°07′01″N 12°29′12″E)

Borna (b Leipzig) station was built as the terminus of the private railway near the town centre. The importance of the station increased as a result of brown coal mining as well as the extension of the line to Chemnitz. Soon further development at the site (which was near the crossroads of the current federal road 93 and federal road 176) became impossible. Therefore, a completely new station was built in 1903/04 southwest of the old site on the outskirts. This station was put into operation on 1 October and from then on the old station served as a siding for freight traffic. In addition to connecting tracks to various brown coal mines, the new station had a locomotive yard with a two-storey Heizhaus (a roundhouse where locomotives were heated). From then on different shunting locomotives were stationed there.

In the following decades, the station continued to grow. The last major construction work took place in the 1930s with the construction of the Borna–Großbothen railway, which branched off at Neukirchen-Wyhra station, although the trains ran from and to Borna. After the end of the Second World War, the station again experienced an increase in traffic, since hardly any foreign fuel was still available. In the 1960s, Borna's production of briquettes reached its climax, with more than ten full trains of briquettes or raw brown coal being moved every day. Following the electrification of the Leipzig–Borna section, locomotives were changed at the station.

A rapid decline of traffic at Borna station started after 1989/90 and all the briquette factories in the surrounding area closed in the first half of the 1990s, so freight transport collapsed almost completely. Today, there is no longer any freight traffic and the track infrastructure has also been greatly reduced. Only the entrance building has been renovated.

The station had five different names during its existence, as follows:

- until 30 September 1901: Borna
- until 30 June 1911: Borna bei Leipzig
- until 21 December 1933: Borna b Leipzig
- since 22 December 1933: Borna (b Leipzig)

The last three names all mean "Borna near Leipzig". DB Station&Service has operated the station since 28 May 2000 as Borna (Leipzig), although it has not been officially renamed.

Petergrube (51°05′55″N 12°30′11″E)

The halt of Petergrube was opened on 1 December 1950. The station was created primarily for commuter traffic to the brown coal mining area. The settlement had no name, but Plateka (now part of Borna) lies directly north-east of the halt.

Neukirchen-Wyhra (51°05′16″N 12°32′01″E)

The station was opened on 1 May 1902 as the halt of Neukirchen-Wyhra; this followed a long campaign by the affected communities. The station gained some importance in 1937 with the opening of the Borna–Großbothen railway, which branched off here. It was reclassified as a station, but the trains to and from Grossbothen already started in Borna. As the brown coal mining south of Leipzig also included the area south of Borna, a dense network of industrial railways was built. Several sidings branched off at Neukirchen-Wyhra station. It has since been reclassified as a halt. The entrance building from the 1930s, which replaced the original station, still exists but is used for other purposes.

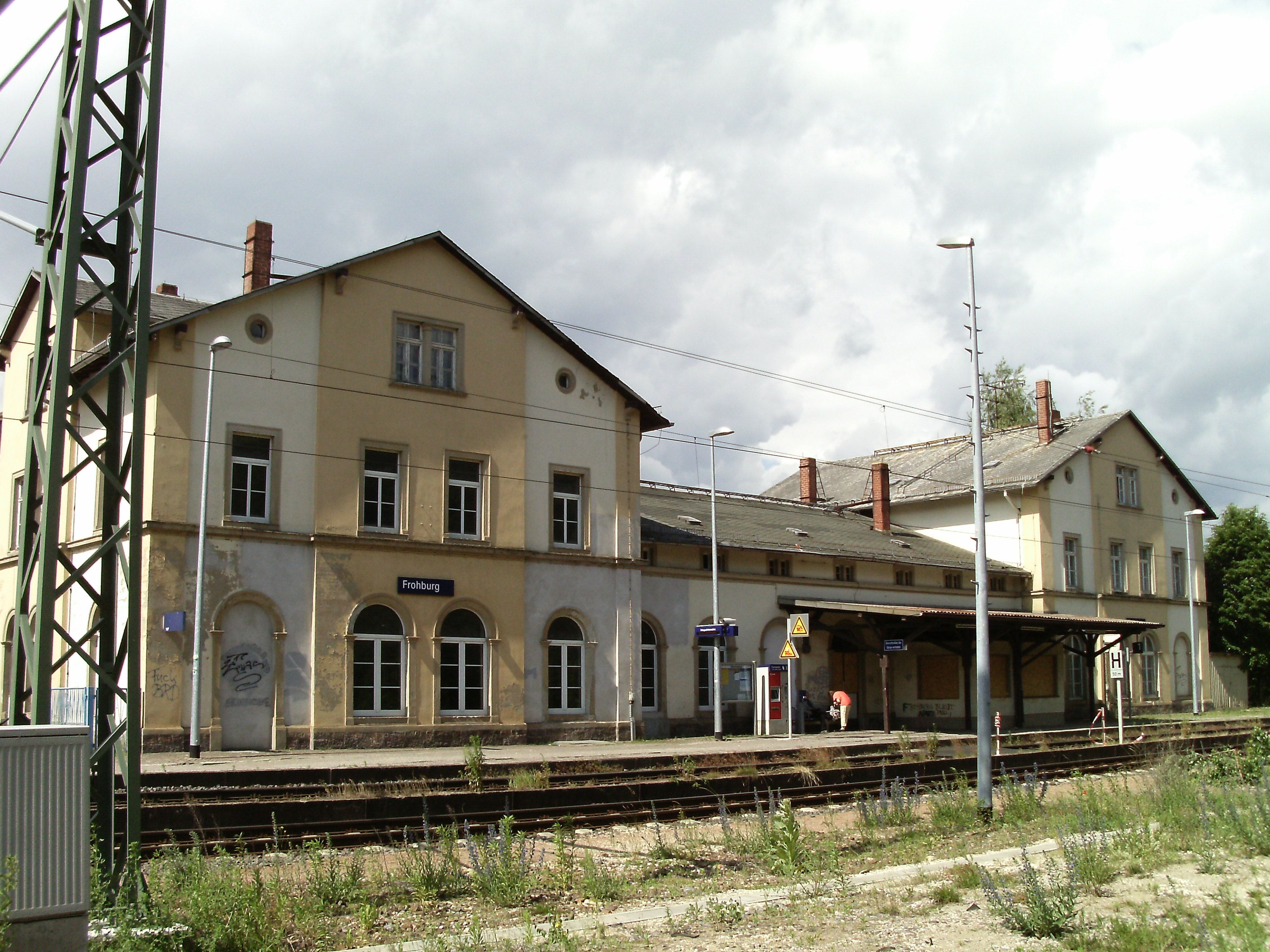
Entrance building of Frohburg station

Frohburg (51°04′09″N 12°33′33″E)

Until the opening of the Frohburg–Kohren-Sahlis railway in 1906, Frohburg station was quite insignificant. A new section of the station was built south of the existing facilities for the line to Kohren. The entrance building consists of a central building, which is joined by two two-and-a-half-story side wings. A freight shed, locomotive maintenance depot, two signal boxes and a workshop were built.

After the traffic on the line to Kohren-Sahlis was discontinued in 1967, the importance of the station declined again. The station has been gradually rebuilt with two tracks and a short section of the line to Kohren-Sahlis is still used as a siding.

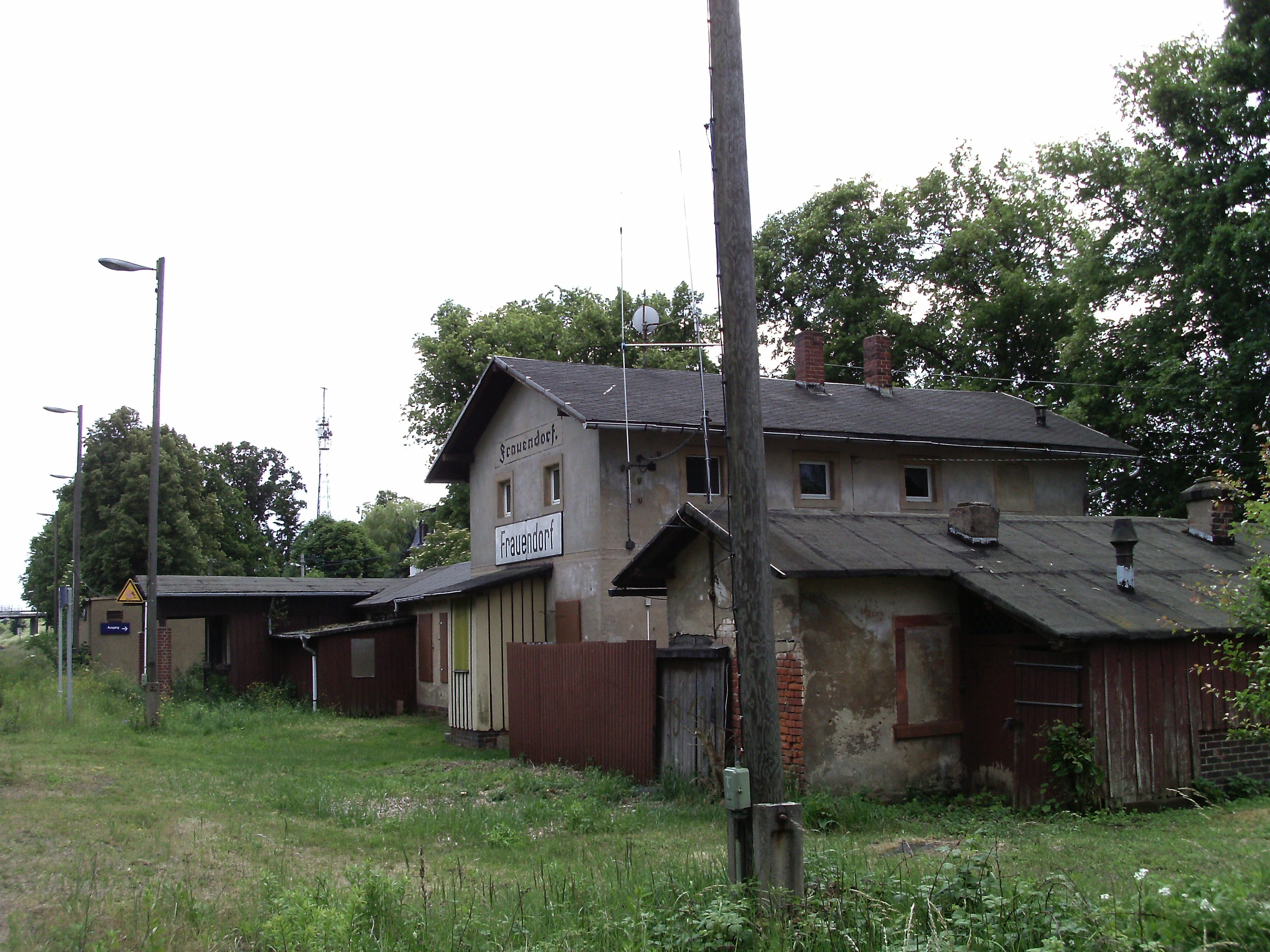
Empfangsgebäude des Bahnhofs Frauendorf, 2012

Frauendorf (Sachs) (51°03′42″N 12°36′59″E)

At the opening of the line there was no other station between Frohburg and Geithain, but the surrounding villages soon requested a station and the Haltepunkt (literally "halt point") of Frauendorf was opened on 1 June 1876. It was reclassified as a Haltestelle ("halt place") in 1878, which meant that goods traffic could also be handled. The station was reclassified as a station on 1 May 1905, when it already consisted of two main tracks with two platforms and two other tracks for freight operations with a loading road, freight sheds and a combination head and side ramp. In addition, Frauendorf also served as a station where trains running between Frohburg and Geithain could cross, which was necessary after traffic increased.

After 1990, the station was reclassified as a halt and then completely abandoned in 2004.

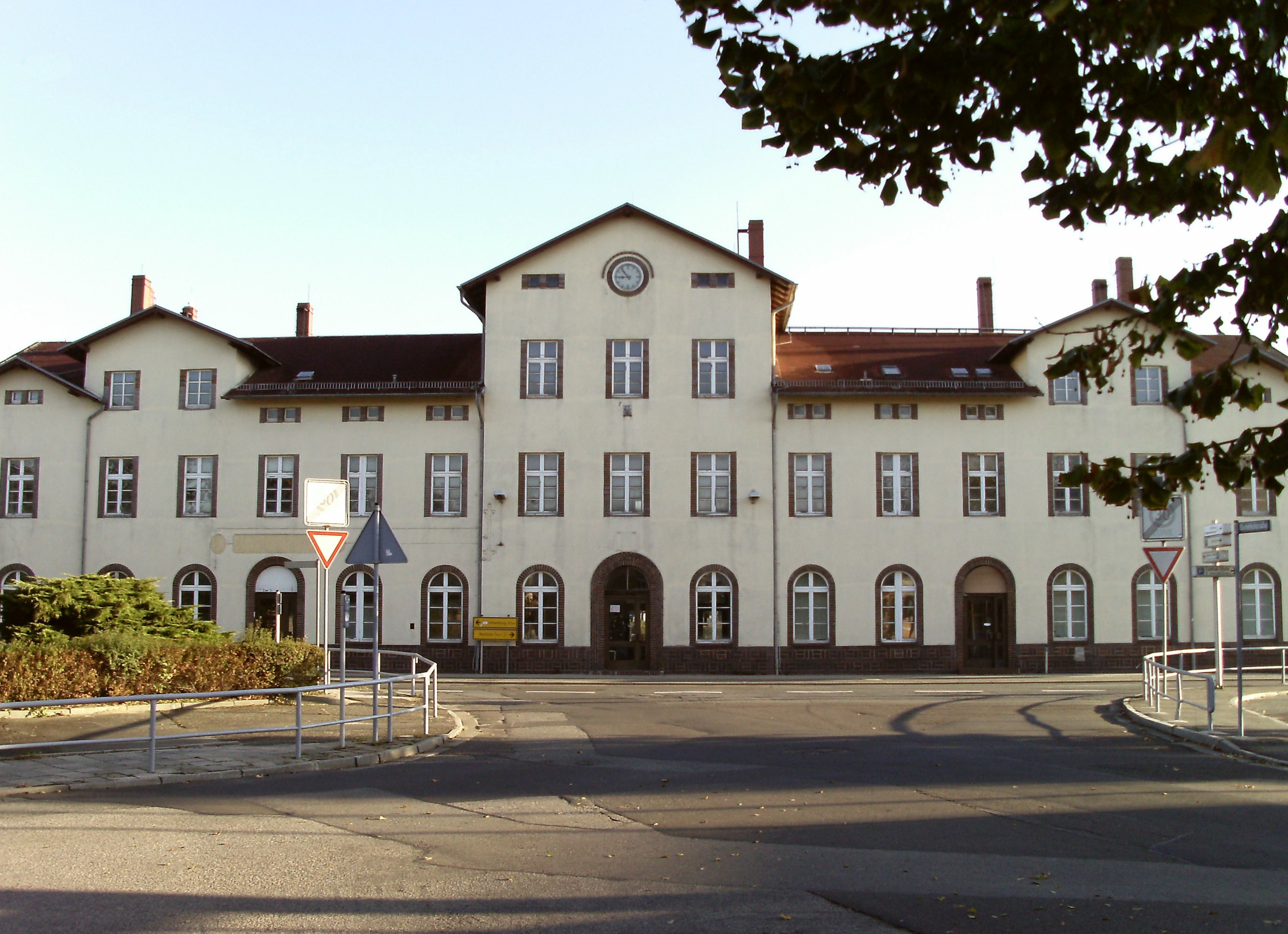
Entrance building of Geithain station, 2011

Geithain (51°03′30″N 12°41′50″E)

Originally, only an intermediate station, Geithain station was completely rebuilt for the commissioning of the Leipzig–Geithain railway in 1887. A locomotive shed was also built. Geithain became more important for freight transport, as large quantities of building material from the nearby brick works and quarries were loaded in the station from the end of the 19th century.

The station acquired its present appearance from 2002 onwards when large parts of it were reconstructed during the upgrade of the Leipzig–Chemnitz line.

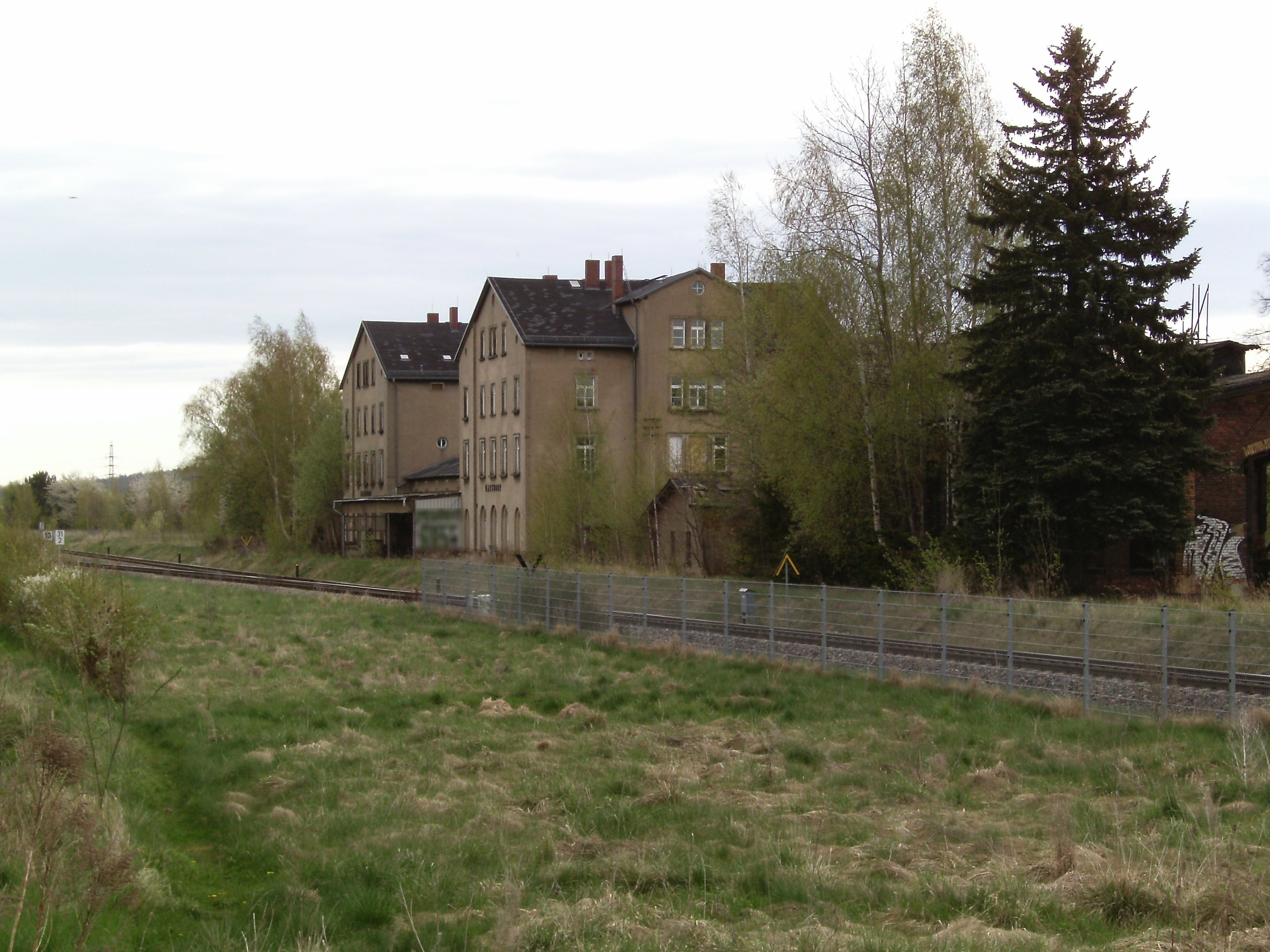
Narsdorf station

Narsdorf (51°00′38″N 12°43′00″E)

Originally, it had been proposed that a station be built in the Obergräfenhain area, but its citizens objected to this. The construction of a railway was also largely opposed in Narsdorf. As a result, Narsdorf station, which was opened on 8 April 1872, was built on the border between Narsdorf and Dölitzsch. Since the branch lines to Rochlitz and Penig branched off here, Narsdorf had a greater operational significance from the outset. Also the trains of the Altenburg–Langenleuba-Oberhain railway, which opened in 1901, operated to and from Narsdorf.

The importance of the station fell greatly as a result of the economic changes following the political changes of 1989/90. All traffic on the branch lines from Narsdorf stopped in 2000. Almost all the tracks have been dismantled and Narsdorf has become a simple halt. The entrance building, the former Heizhaus (roundhouse) and other buildings for freight transport are now empty and increasingly decaying.

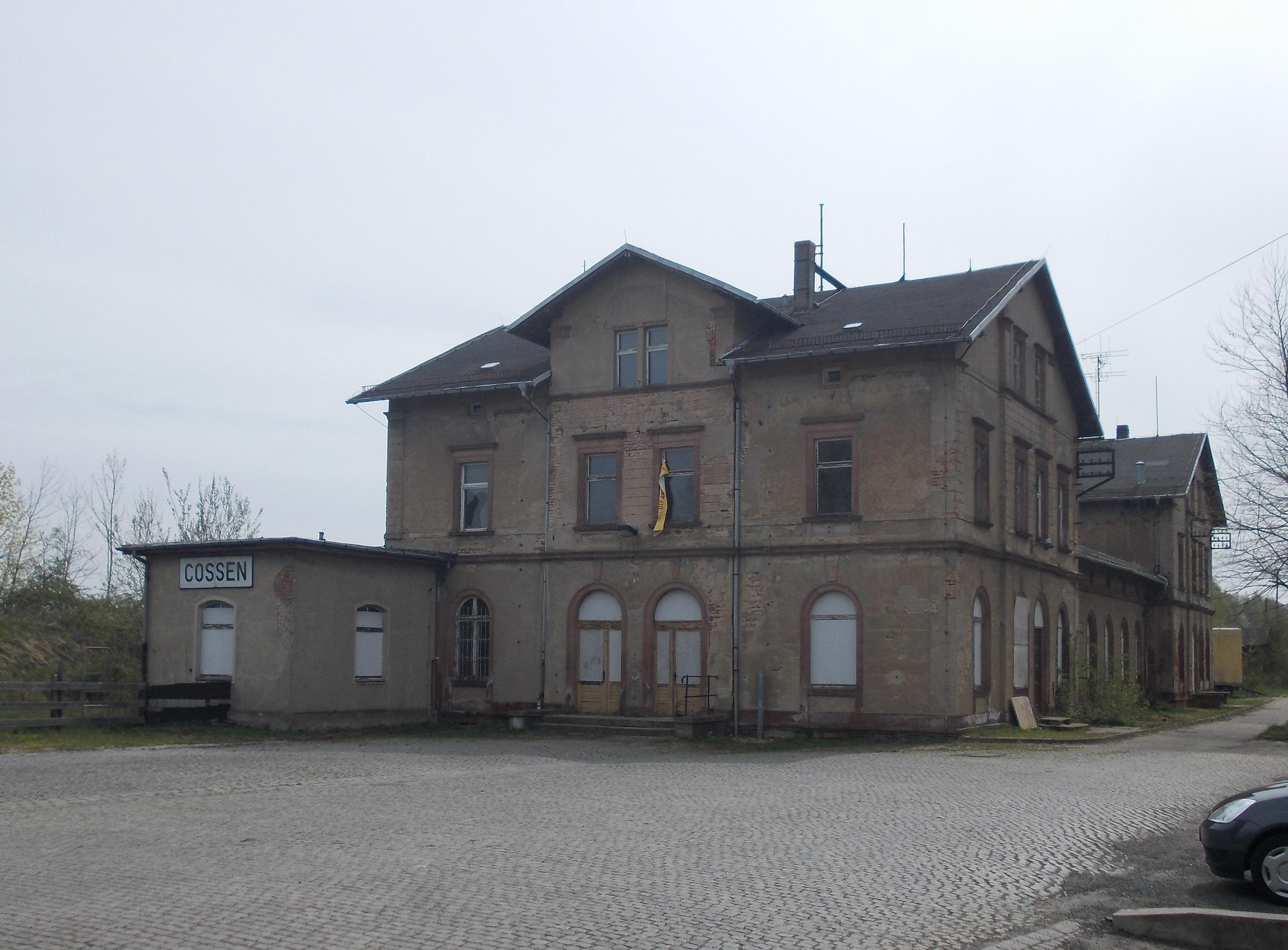
Cossen station

Cossen (50°58′08″N 12°46′47″E)

Cossen station had an entrance building, a workshop, a tool shed, a station residence and two signal boxes. There was no freight shed, although the station was important for freight traffic. Instead, there was a loading ramp and a loading road. Sand was transported from a number of sandpits in the surrounding area to the railway by Feldbahn and cableway. For a time the Bahnmeisterei (track maintenance supervisor's office) of Chemnitz had an outpost here, along with a small rail vehicle.

Today there are only two tracks in the station which serve freight trains transferring to and from Küchwald, as passenger services at the station ended on 4 April 2005. The buildings that remain are now largely empty.

Burgstädt (50°54′56″N 12°48′45″E)

The entrance building of Burgstädt station was at first identical with those in Cossen and Frohburg; Limbach station also had a similar building. In 1910, the building received an extension, the design of which led to a court case. From the beginning, the station was one of the most important intermediate stations on the line. For example, approximately half a million people were handled every year around 1900. Burgstädt has also been a stop for express trains since 1912. The station also had considerable importance in freight transport. In addition to several sidings, there were a freight shed, two loading roads and two loading ramps (a head ramp and a side ramp). A small locomotive had been available for shunting from the 1930s, which also used to transfer freight to and from the stations of Cossen and Wittgensdorf ob Bf. This locomotive was withdrawn from the station in the summer of 1991.

A bus station was built on the station forecourt in 2003, before the entrance building, which had existed since its opening, was demolished. The track infrastructure has also been significantly reduced and only the main track and a bay platform track still exist from the originally eight tracks. Both are equipped with a platform, as the trains of the City-Bahn terminate in Burgstädt.

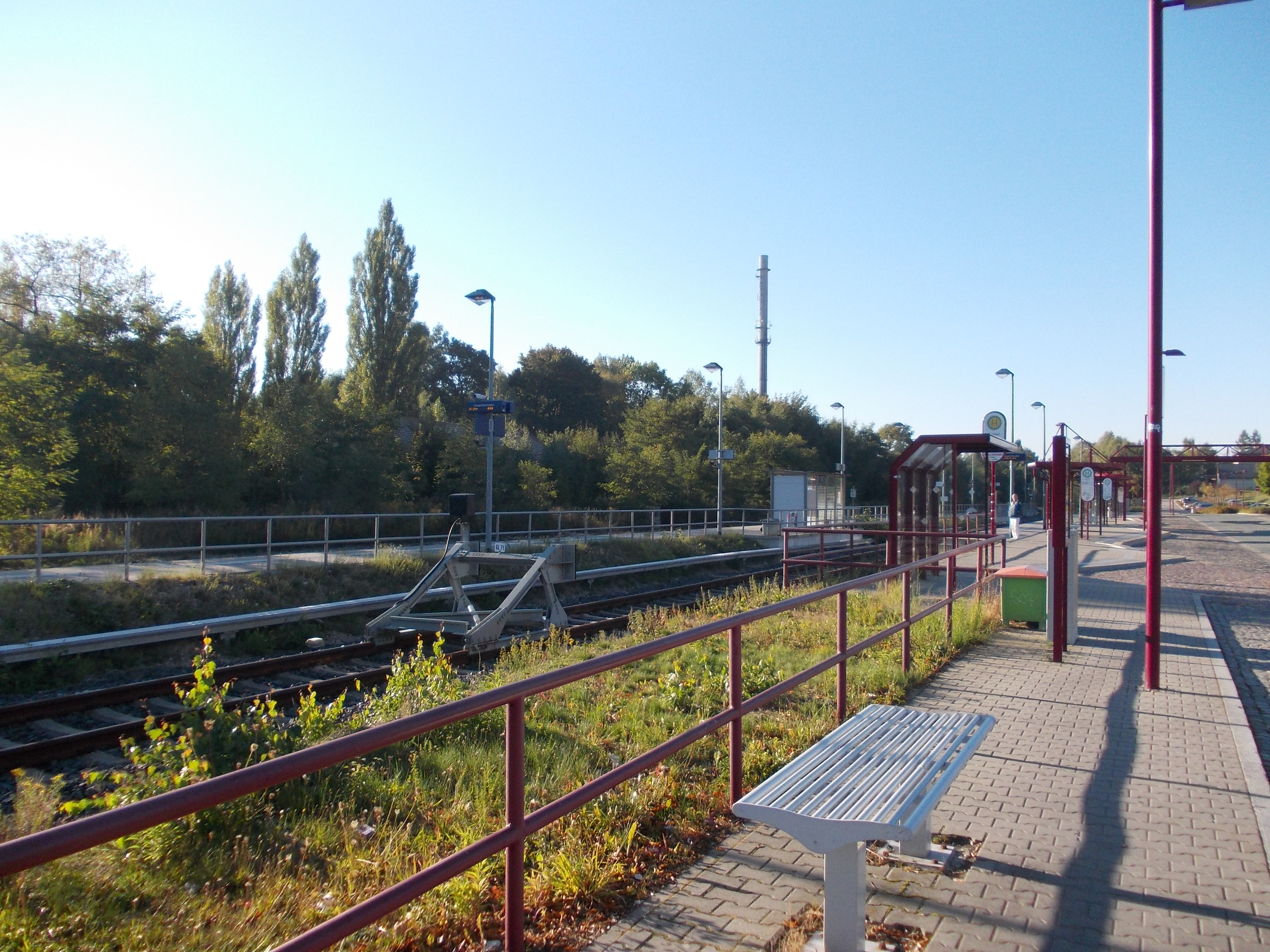
Burgstädt station

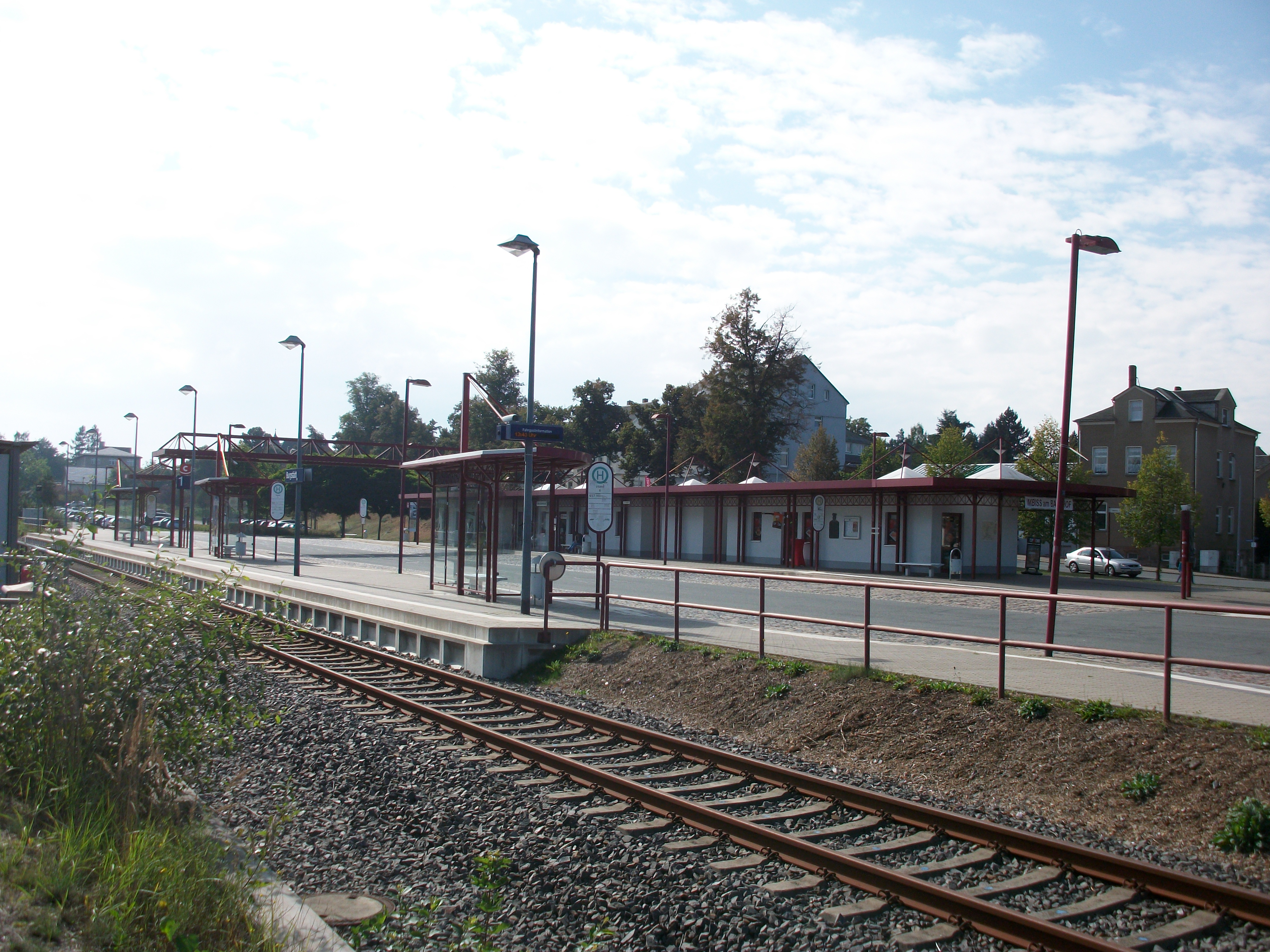
Burgstädt railway and bus stations (2016)

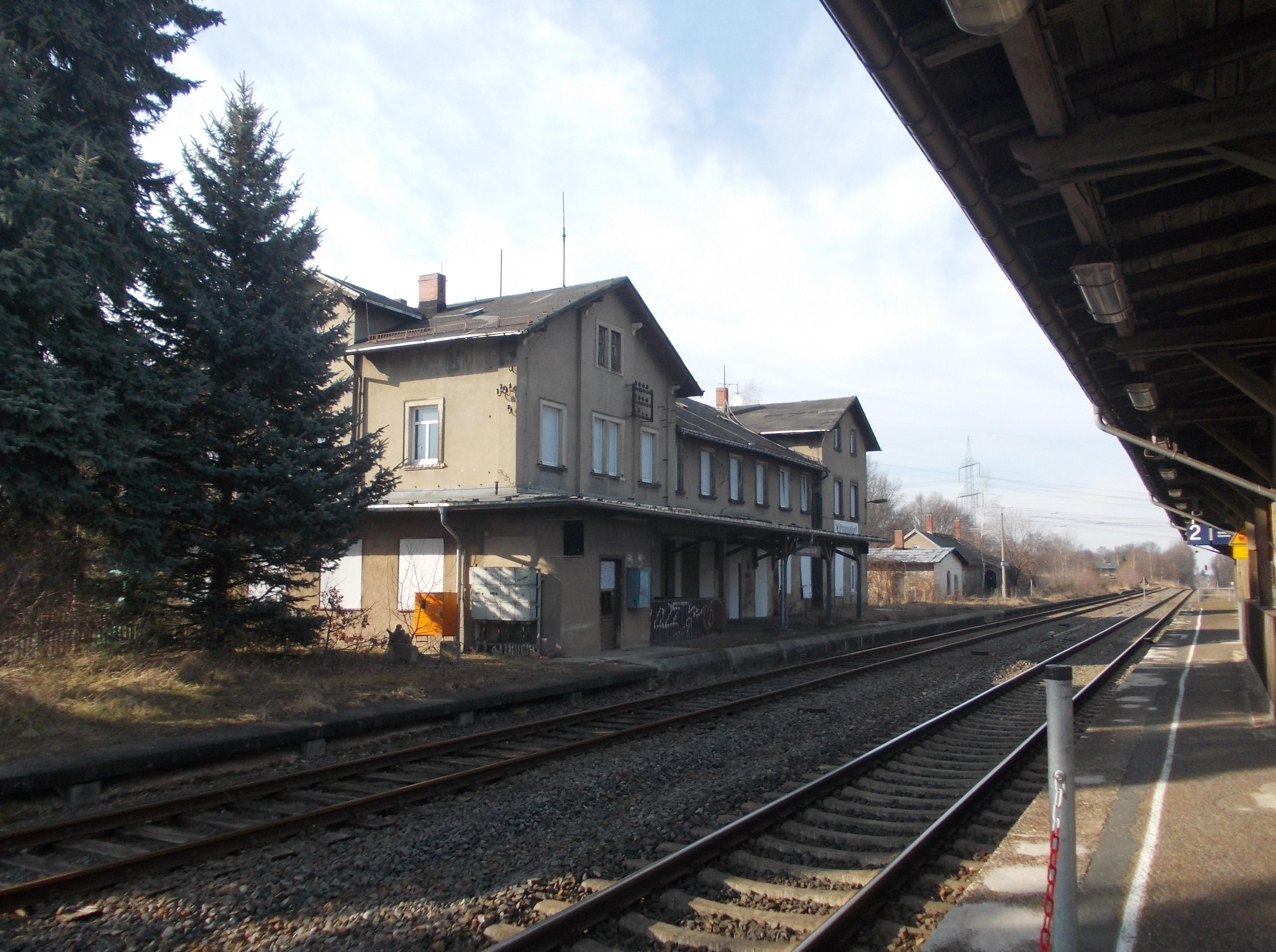
Wittgensdorf ob Bf

Wittgensdorf ob Bf (50°53′00″N 12°50′28″E)

Wittgensdorf ob Bf (short for oberer Bahnhof, meaning "upper station") was opened on 8 April 1872 as Wittgensdorf. The branch line to Limbach has branched off since the opening of the station, making Wittgensdorf an important site for rail operations. In the beginning, freight traffic was important because it was the closest station for many factories in the Chemnitz valley. After the opening of the Wechselburg–Küchwald railway in 1902, freight transport fell considerably, since the municipality of Wittgensdorf now had a second station on that line with Unterwittgensdorf (low Wittgensdorf), which was better located for the factories. In 1927, the two stations were renamed with Wittgensdorf renamed as Wittgensdorf ob Bf and Unterwittgensdorf renamed as Wittgensdorf unt Bf (short for unterer Bahnhof, meaning "lower station").

Traffic on the line to Limbach-Oberfrohna was discontinued in 2001. Nevertheless, the station has significant operational importance, since a section of the former line to a tank depot in Hartmannsdorf bei Chemnitz is regularly served. Since 2005, this line has been operated as a siding of the station.

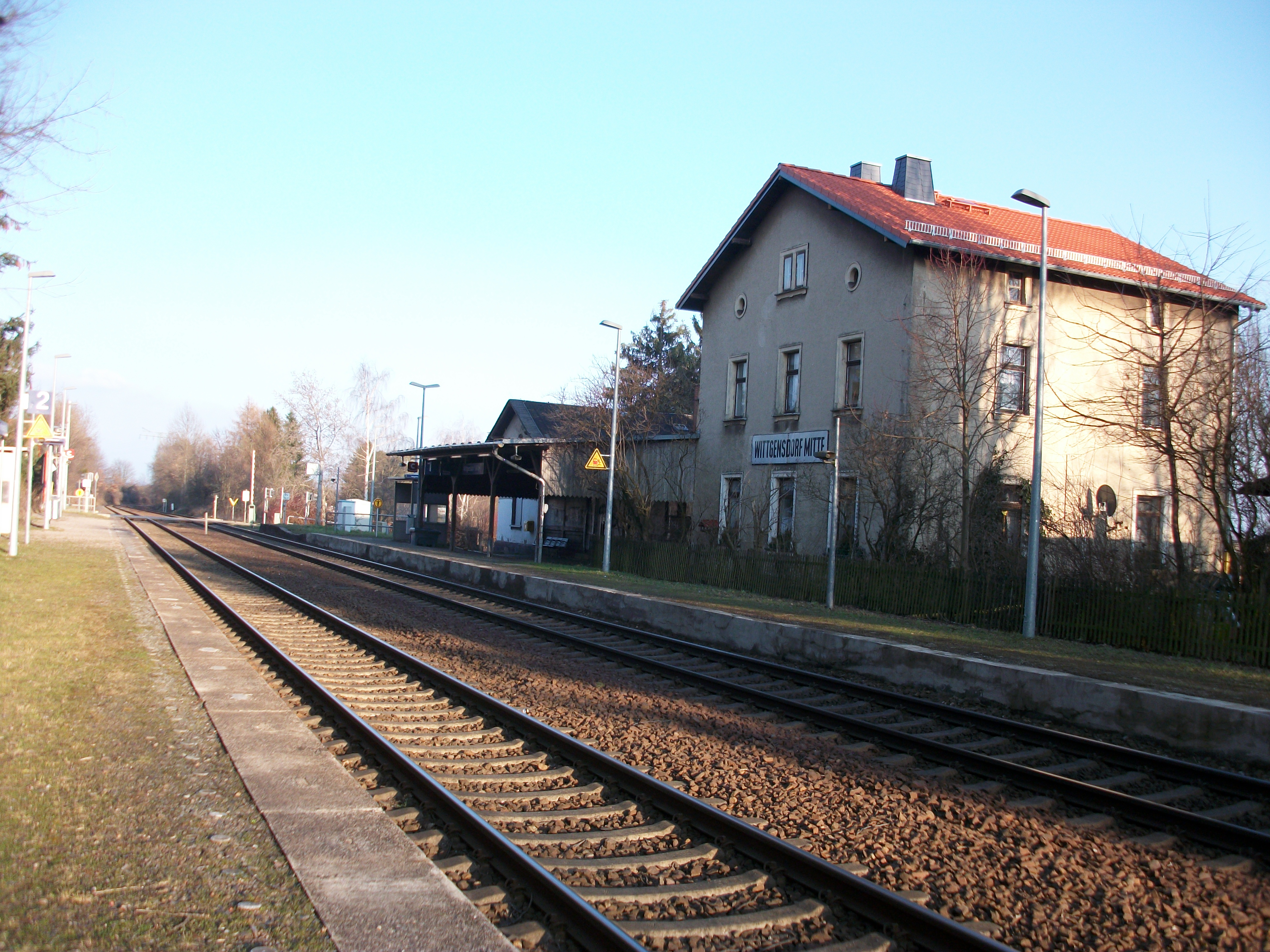
Wittgensdorf Mitte station (2016)

Wittgensdorf Mitte (50°52′27″N 12°52′10″E)

The halt of Wittgensdorf Mitte consists only of two platforms. The platform for services to Chemnitz is next to a small solid entrance building with an attached wooden waiting room, but on the opposite platform there is only a wooden waiting room. The station has had three different names during its period of operations, as follows:

- until 30 April 1898: Haltepunkt Bahrmühle
- until 1 October 1927: Haltepunkt Mittelwittgensdorf
- since 2 October 1927: Haltepunkt Wittgensdorf Mitte

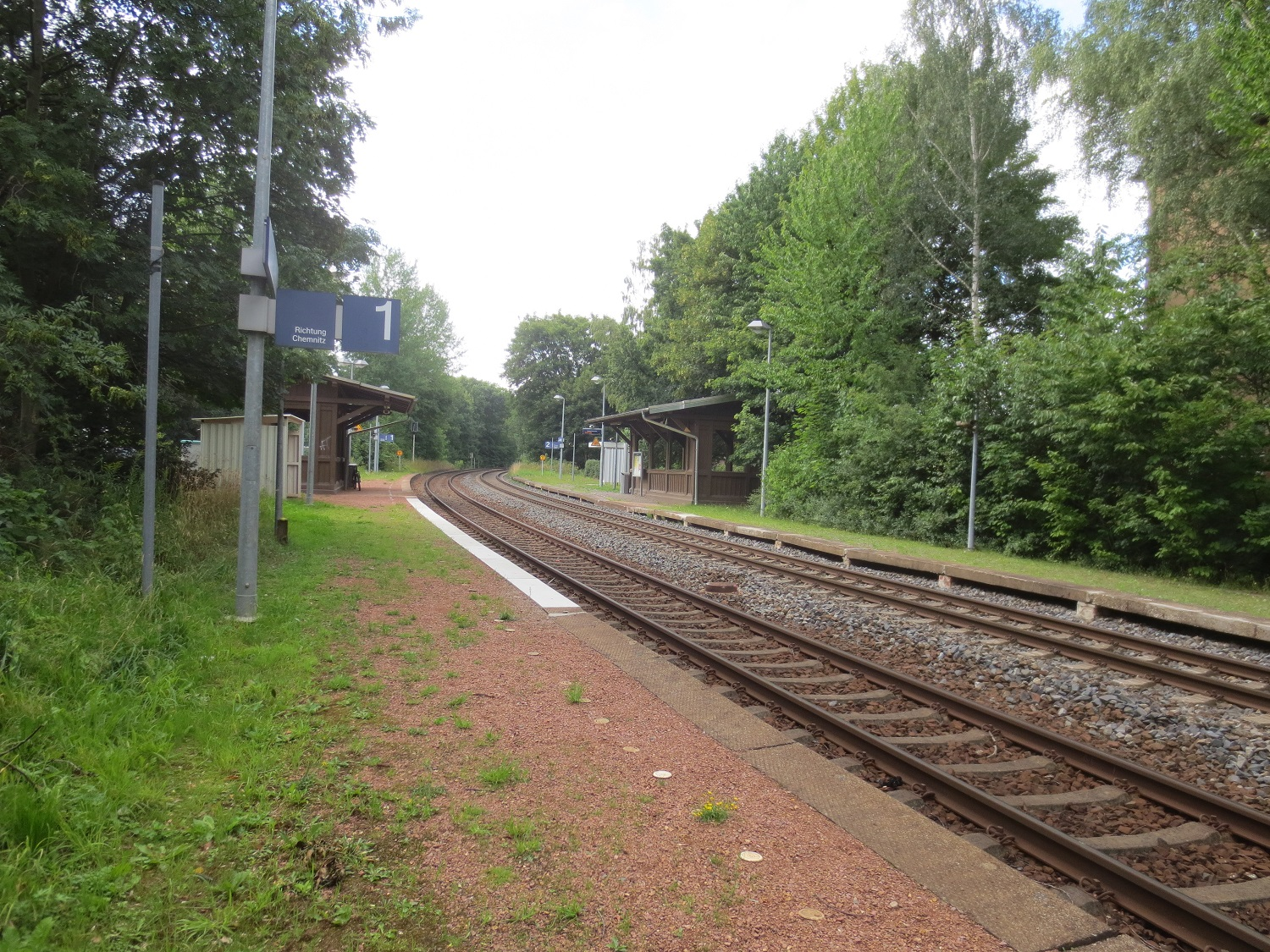
The halt of Chemnitz-Borna

Chemnitz-Borna Hp (50°51′35″N 12°53′40″E)

The halt was opened on 15 July 1901. It is now only served by the City-Bahn Chemnitz. It is located on Sandstraße in Chemnitz-Borna. Chemnitz-Borna Ldst station on the Küchwald–Obergrüna railway, which was located a few hundred metres southwest of the halt of Chemnitz-Borna in the street of Abendleite, was used for freight traffic between 1903 and 2004. The halt has had four different names during its operating period, as follows:

- until 30 June 1911: Borna bei Chemnitz Haltepunkt
- until 25 July 1913: Borna b Chemnitz Hp
- until 9 May 1953: Chemnitz-Borna Hp
- until 29 May 1990: Karl-Marx-Stadt-Borna Hp
- since 30 May 1990: Chemnitz-Borna Hp

Küchwald (50°51′20″N 12°54′45″E)

In the 1880s, the existing stations in Chemnitz could no longer cope with the rapidly growing freight traffic. In addition to the urgent need for a railway connection to the numerous factories in the north of the city, an efficient marshalling yard was also needed. It was planned to build a marshalling yard on the grounds of the current Küchwald freight yard. There was sufficient land available for its construction, but the station would have been located off the main Dresden–Zwickau–Reichenbach traffic axis. A new location was chosen, the rising area south of the rail workshops. The Kieritzsch–Chemnitz line and the Riesa–Chemnitz lines both received direct links to the new marshalling yard at Hilbersdorf station. Küchwald Zweigstelle (Küchwald junction) was built at the end of this connecting line and the Küchwald freight yard was opened together with the marshalling yard and the connecting railway in 1902. The trains on the Wechselburg–Küchwald railway, which opened in 1902, also used the tracks of the Kieritzsch-Chemnitz railway from here to the Hauptbahnhof.

Soon the yard was extended, since the Küchwald–Obergrüna industrial railway opened in 1903 had its starting point here and other factories were established in the vicinity. Küchwald also took over part of the train marshalling.

Traffic has declined sharply since 1990. The line through the Chemnitz valley was closed in 2002 and the line to Grüna was closed in 2004. Only the line to HKW Chemnitz-Nord power station is still served from here.

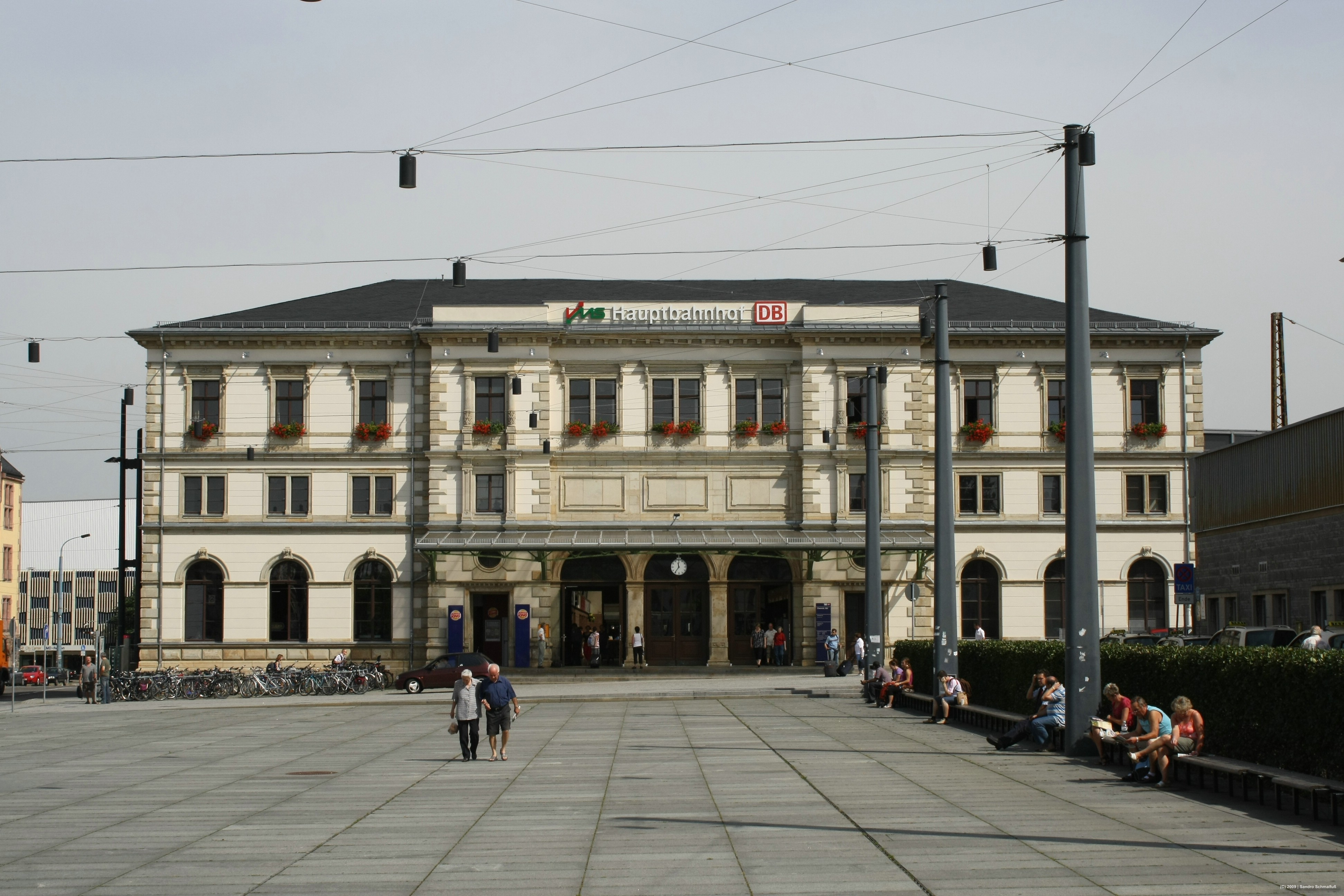
Chemnitz Hauptbahnhof (2009)

The establishment of an external platform on the right-hand track for suburban rail services is planned with commissioning at the earliest at the 2017/2018 timetable change, according to information from the beginning of 2016.

Chemnitz Hbf (50°50′28″N 12°55′53″E)

The current Chemnitz Hauptbahnhof was founded in 1852 as the terminus of the Riesa–Chemnitz railway. With the construction of the Chemnitz–Zwickau (1858), the Chemnitz–Annaberg (1866), the Borna–Chemnitz and the Chemnitz–Adorf (1875) lines, it became one of the most important Saxon railway junctions. In addition to passenger traffic, the station was also important for freight operations and until the end of the 1870s, the station was the only one in Chemnitz that handled freight. Since the 1990s, its importance has been greatly diminished by the general drop in traffic, the loss of long-distance traffic and some line closures. Freight operations are no longer taking place. The large Chemnitz Hbf locomotive depot, which was later integrated with the Chemnitz-Hilbersdorf locomotive depot, still exists as the Chemnitz locomotive depot.

=== Engineering works ===
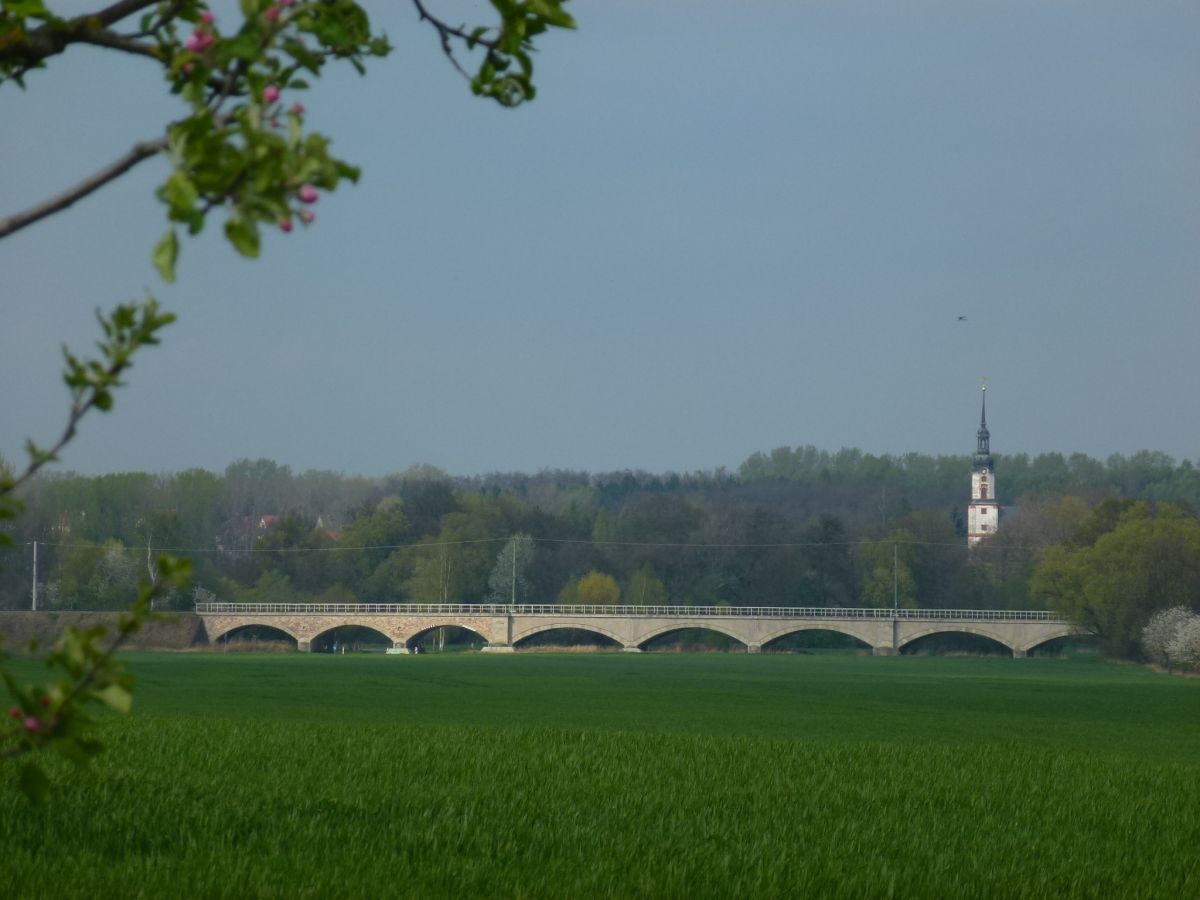
Wyhra Valley Viaduct

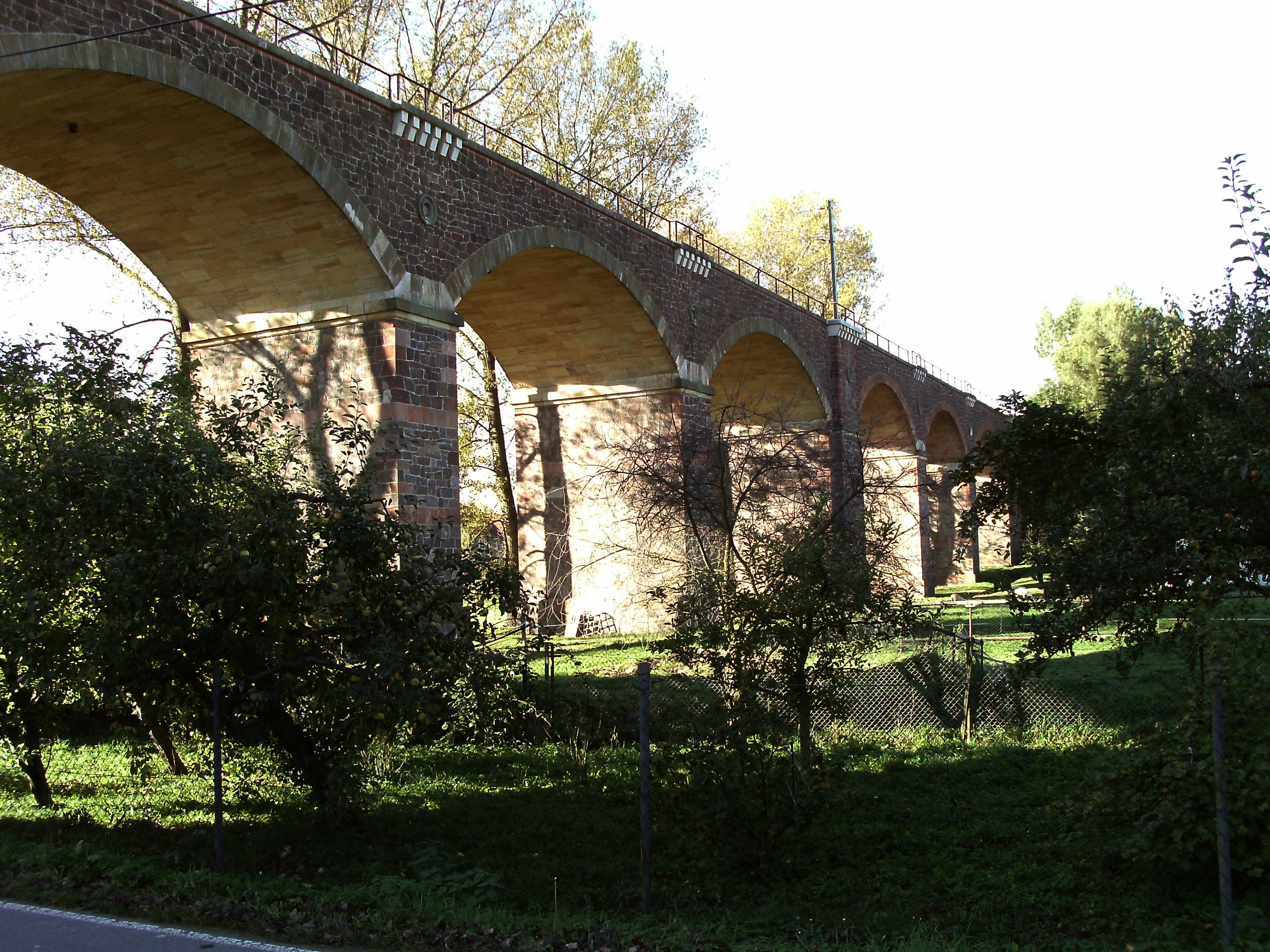
Niedergräfenhain Viaduct

All large bridge structures were prepared from the outset for doubling of the track.

Wyhra Valley Viaduct (51°05′45″N 12°30′47″E)

The 198 metre-long Wyhra Valley Viaduct at line-kilometre 10.48 crosses the Wyhra river. The eight-metre-high twelve-span viaduct was built between September 1869 and August 1870 and cost about 70,000 Thalers.

Niedergräfenhain Viaduct (51°03′35″N 12°38′30″E)

Like Geithain Viaduct, Niedergräfenhain Viaduct would not have been necessary except that the Geithain citizens demanded the rerouting of the line. It was built for around 150,000 Thalers from July 1869 to November 1871. The 200 metre-long structure crossed the valley over twelve spans.

Geithain Viaduct (51°03′44″N 12°40′31″E)

Geithain Viaduct was built from July 1869 to September 1871. During construction of the 75,000-metre-high bridge, the wet ground proved to be a problem and the bridge piers therefore had extra deep foundations. The maximum height of the structure is 17 metres and it is 110 metres long.

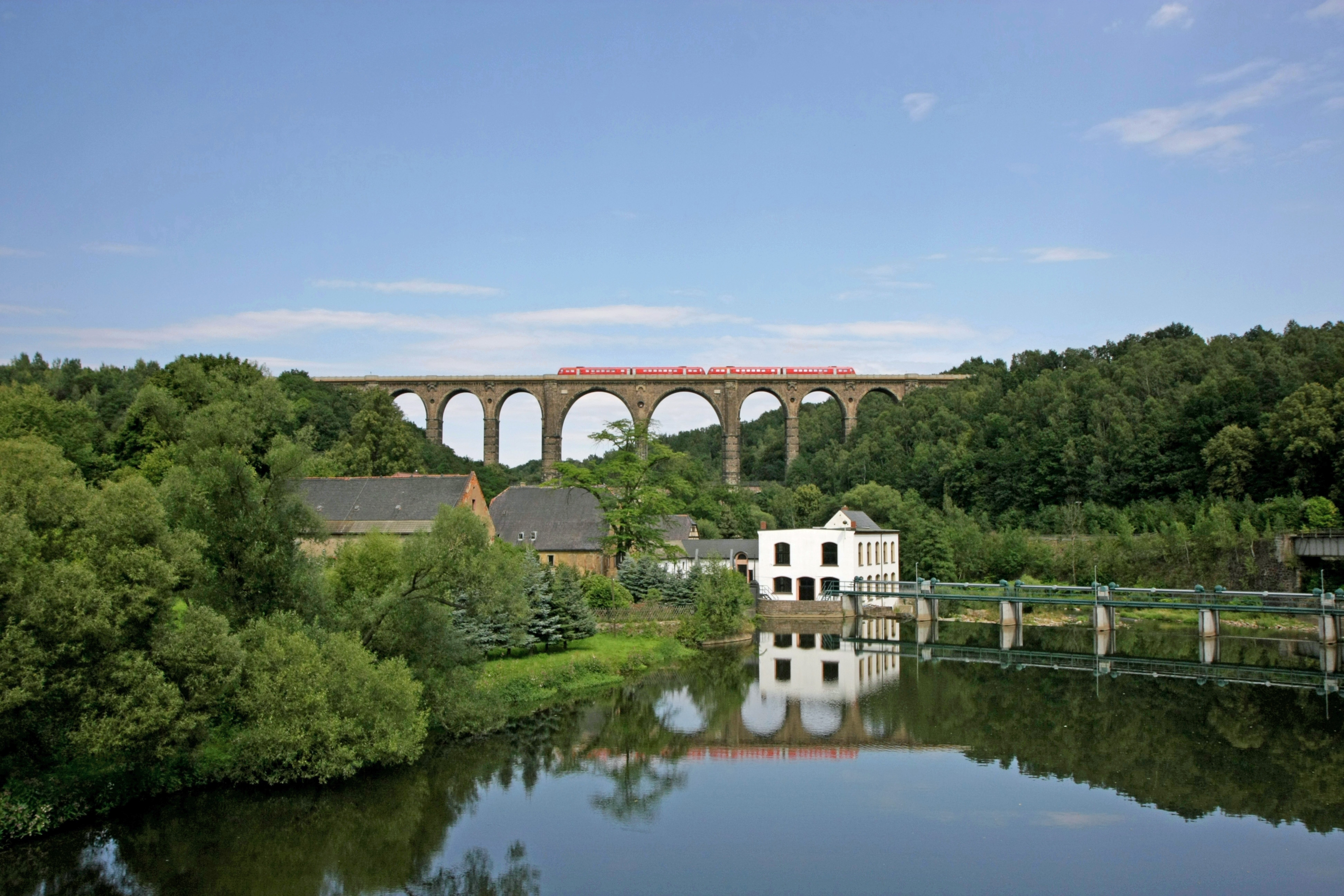
Göhren Viaduct over the Zwickauer Mulde

Göhren Viaduct (50°58′53″N 12°46′09″E)

Göhren Viaduct with 412 m-long was built of granite by around 5,000 workers from 1869 to 1871. The 68 metre-high structure, built as a cost of 1.2 million Thalers, bridges the Zwickauer Mulde, the Cossen–Wechselburg state road and the Glauchau–Wurzen railway. In addition to the large bridge spans crossing the deep Mulden valley, there were nine smaller spans towards Chemnitz. The latter had become so dilapidated by the 1980s, that they were filled in the mid-1980s and since then the viaduct has only been 263 metres-long. The remaining viaduct was fundamentally renovated from 1997 to 2001 for about 20 million Marks.

Cossen Viaduct (50°58′30″N 12°46′28″E)

The 162 m-long Cossen Viaduct had six arches with a clearance of 17 metres. The structure, which cost about 69,000 Thalers, had become so dilapidated by the 1960s that, in 1968, five of the six spans were walled up and then filled in. Because an industrial road ran through the sixth span, the structure was significantly reduced in size.

Burgstädt Urban Viaduct (50°55′10″N 12°48′54″E)

The 427 metre-long Burgstädt Urban Viaduct is the longest engineering structure on the line. It was built in 1869/70 for around 90,000 Thalers to avoid the need to build an embankment. It crosses a valley with 34 9.9 metre-long spans, which have a maximum height of 7.5 metres. From the 1960s, there were plans to modify the viaduct fundamentally because of financial shortages. Similar to Cossen Viaduct, all openings would have been filled up except for the necessary road crossings. The viaduct has been renovated instead.

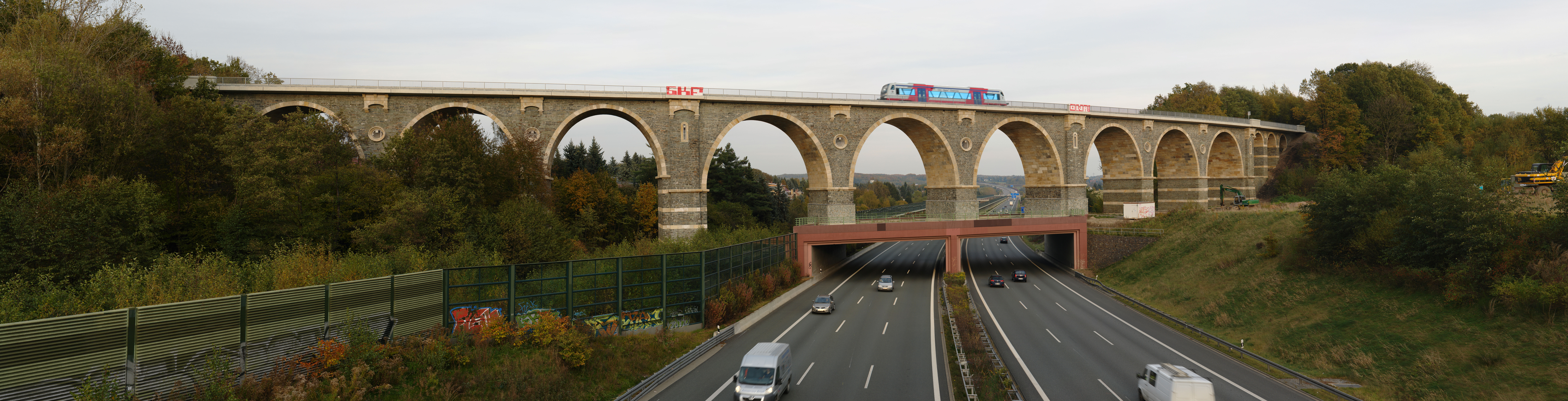
The reconstructed viaduct over the Bahrebach in 2010

Bahrebach Valley Viaduct (50°52′04″N 12°52′54″E)

The Bahrebach Valley Viaduct cost around 310,000 Thalers. The 230 metre-long bridge, lying on a curve, crosses the Bahrebach and, since the 1930s, today's Autobahn 4. Since the space between the bridge piers was not wide enough for the widening of the originally four-lane motorway, the viaduct was extensively rebuilt from 1999 to 2003.

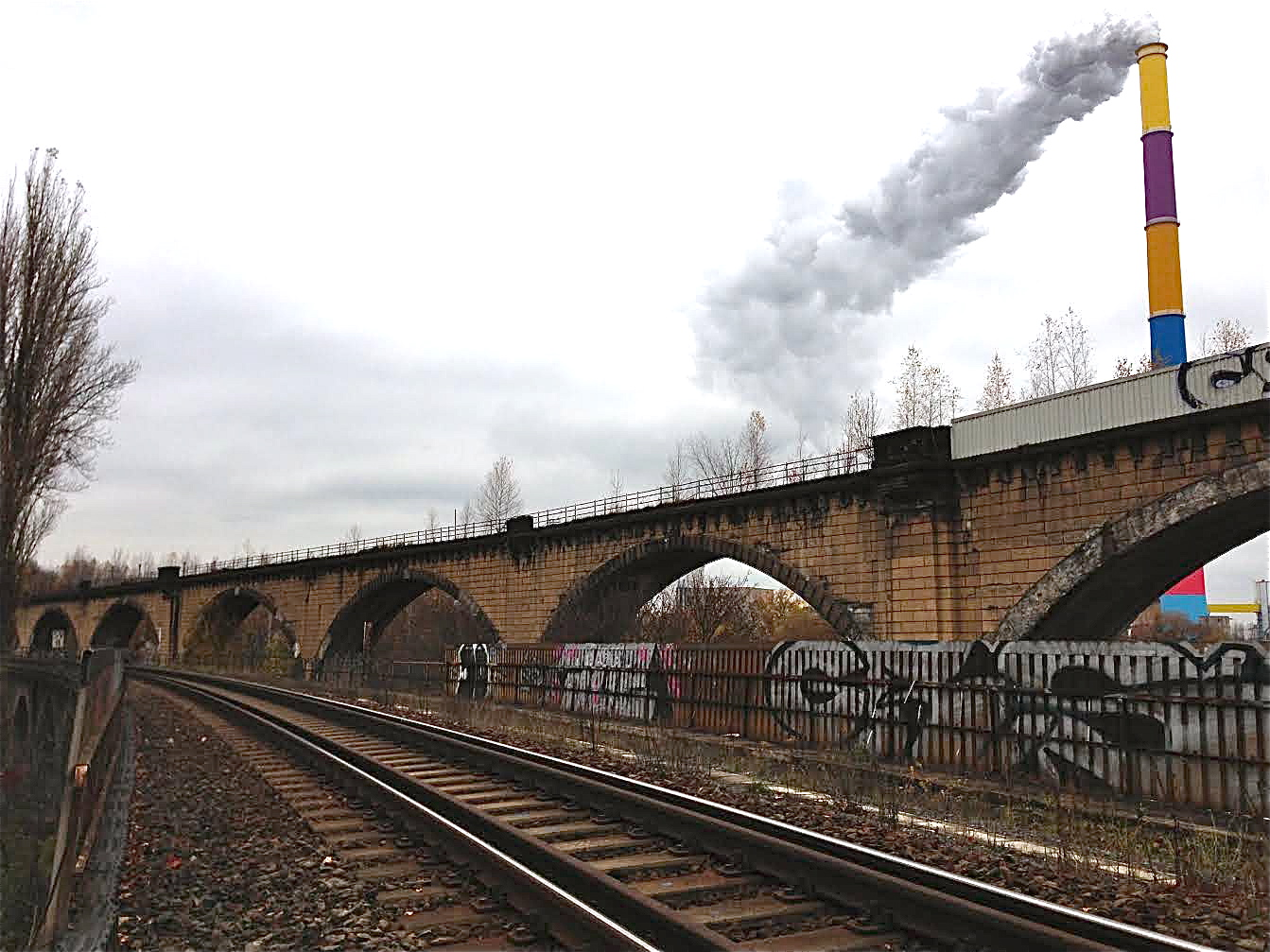
Chemnitz Valley Viaduct

Chemnitz Valley Viaduct (50°51′13″N 12°55′39″E)

The Chemnitz Valley Viaduct, which cost about 160,000 Thalers, was built from July 1869 to June 1871. It consists of a 180-metre-long multi-part steel-supported section, followed by a 118-metre-long brick section, with a total length of 308 metres. It crosses the Chemnitz river on six steel trusses, each 25.5 metres-long. The bridge consisted of nine brick arch spans, with the one at the crossing of federal road 107 having an opening of 11.7 metres and the other eight spans having openings with a width of 9.8 metres. This section lies on a slight curve.

Due to the noise of the steel section during train crossings, it was also popularly given the name of Klapperbrücke (rattling bridge). This bridge section was renovated in 2003 for €1.5 million.
