= Parkeisenbahn Chemnitz =

Narrow-gauge children's railway in Chemnitz, Germany

Coordinates: 50.8475°N 12.9097°E

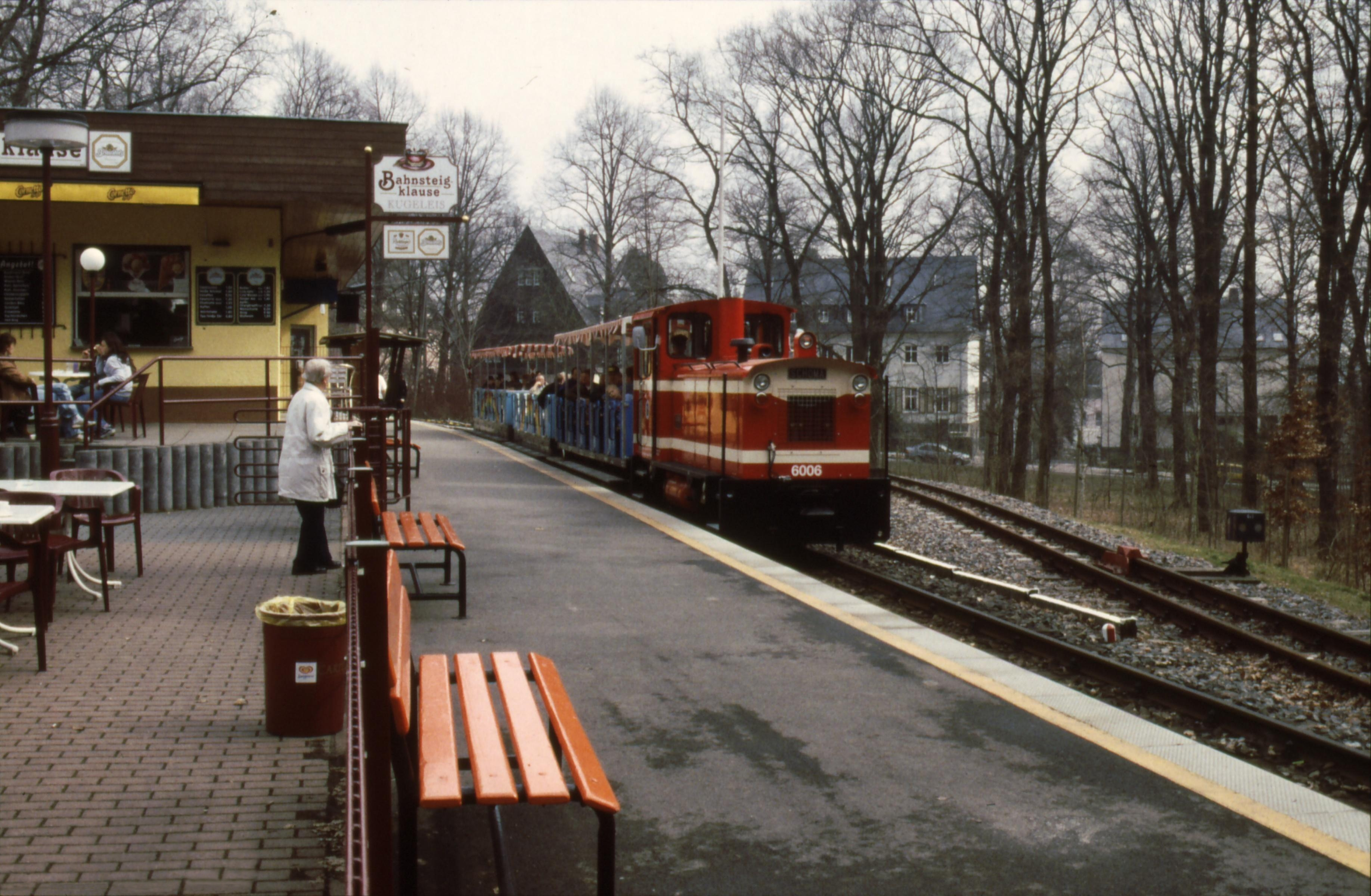
- Engine 6006 in Bahnhof Küchwaldwiese (2003)

Overview
- Locale: Küchwald, Chemnitz-Schloßchemnitz, Chemnitz, Saxony, Germany
- Termini: Küchwaldwiese

Service
- Route number: 12248

Technical
- Line length: 2.3 km (1.4 mi)
- Number of tracks: 1
- Track gauge: 600 mm
- Operating speed: 15 km/h

The Parkeisenbahn Chemnitz (PEC) is a narrow gauge children's railway in Chemnitz, Saxony, Germany. It is 2.3 kilometres long and has one station, two stops, one depot and one block post. Until 1990 it was operated as a Pioniereisenbahn. The Parkeisenbahn has six diesel locomotives, two steam locomotives, nine passenger wagons and some other vehicles. It has the route number 12248.

With the exception of the engine driver and the station master, all jobs around the railway are done by children and teenagers.
