= Chemnitz-Hilbersdorf station =

Railway halt and former yard in Chemnitz, Germany

Chemnitz Hilbersdorf
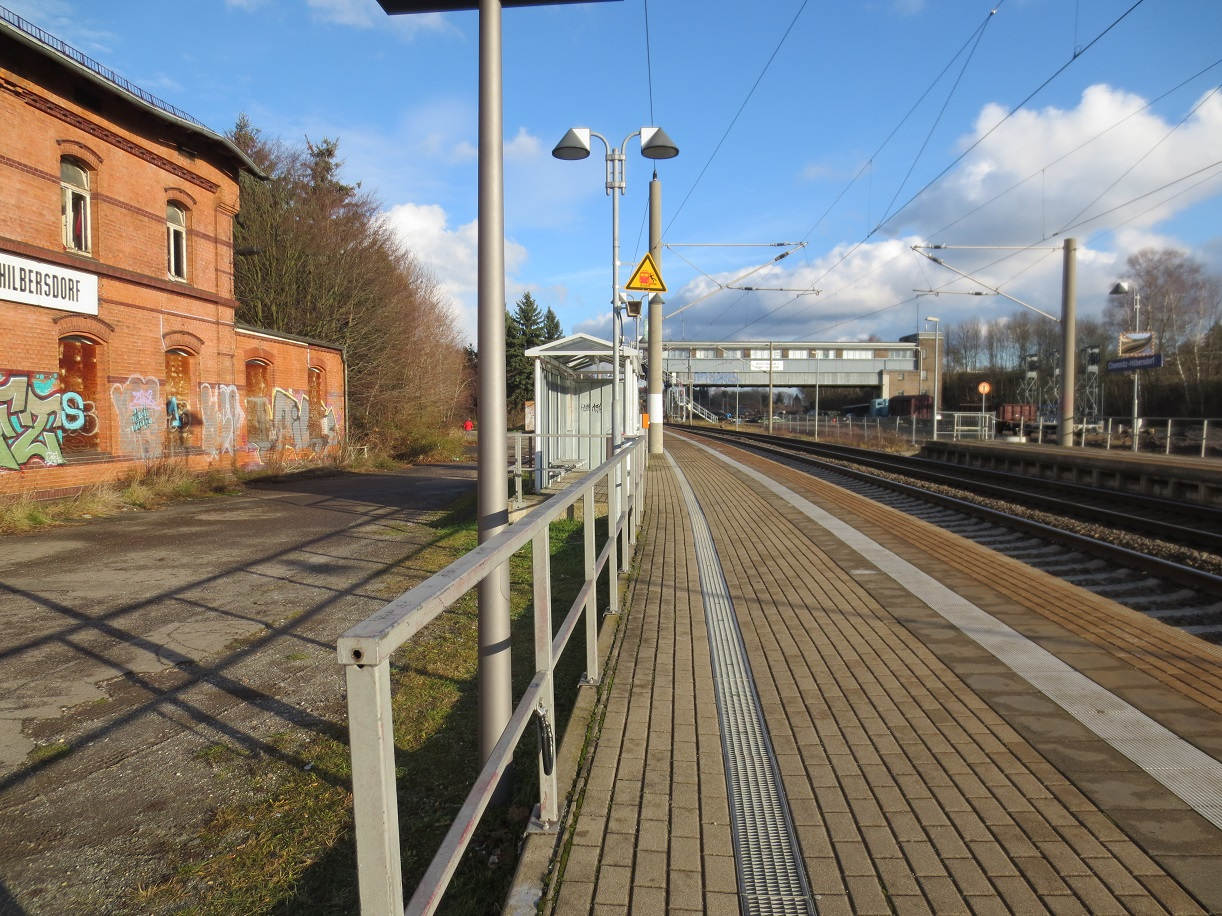
- Chemnitz-Hilbersdorf Haltepunkt

General information
- Location: Ebersdorfer Str. 2, Chemnitz, Saxony; Germany
- Coordinates: 50°51′42″N 12°57′12″E
- Line: Dresden–Werdau
- Platforms: 2

Construction
- Accessible: No

Other information
- Station code: 1050
- DS100 code: DCHP
- IBNR: 8013450
- Category: 6
- Website: www.bahnhof.de

History
- Opened: 15 August 1893
- Former names: Hilbersdorf; Chemnitz-Hilbersdorf; Karl-Marx-Stadt-Hilbersdorf

Services
Preceding station	Mitteldeutsche Regiobahn	Following station
Chemnitz Hbf towards Zwickau Hbf	RB 30	Niederwiesa towards Dresden Hbf
Preceding station	City-Bahn Chemnitz	Following station
Chemnitz Hbf towards Chemnitz Technopark	C15	Niederwiesa towards Hainichen
Location

Chemnitz-Hilbersdorf

General information
- Location: Chemnitz-Hilbersdorf, Saxony, Germany
- System: Rail yard
- Lines: Dresden–Werdau (DW); Küchwald/Abzw Chemnitz-Furth–Chemnitz-Hilbersdorf (KCCh/RCCh)
- Platforms: -

Other information
- Station code: -
- DS100 code: DCH
- Website: Bahnland-Sachsen.de.tlSachsenschiene.de

History
- Opened: 1899
- Closed: 1997
- Former names: Hilbersdorf, Chemnitz-Hilbersdorf, Karl-Marx-Stadt-Hilbersdorf
Location

Chemnitz-Hilbersdorf is the name of a former freight yard and a halt on the Dresden–Werdau railway in the city of Chemnitz in the German state of Saxony. The halt is today served by Regionalbahn services on the Dresden–Zwickau route (RB 30) as well as by local trains of City-Bahn Chemnitz to Hainichen and central Chemnitz (C15). Both lines run hourly, together they offer a service approximately every 30 minutes in each direction.

The formerly much more important Chemnitz-Hilbersdorf freight yard has been closed and largely dismantled. It was the largest marshalling yard of the Dresden railway division (Reichsbahndirektion Dresden) after Dresden-Friedrichstadt station. The Chemnitz-Hilbersdorf locomotive depot (Bahnbetriebswerk) has also been disbanded. Today it houses the Saxon Railway Museum. The Saxon Railway Museum and the Museum of Technology Rope Shunting System are also named "Schauplatz Eisenbahn Chemnitz Hilbersdorf".

== Name ==
The station had three different names during its existence:

- until 30 April 1904: Hilbersdorf
- until 9 May 1953: Chemnitz-Hilbersdorf
- until 29 May 1990: Karl-Marx-Stadt-Hilbersdorf
- since 30 May 1990: Chemnitz-Hilbersdorf

== History ==
At the opening of the line there was no station in Hilbersdorf, although the municipality, which was independent until 1904, had long sought access to the railway. A "halt point" (Haltepunkt) was not established until 15 August 1893. It was reclassified upwards as a "halt place" (Haltestelle) on 1 January 1899. From then on, it could also handle goods. Originally the station was located in the area of the later marshalling yard; when the marshalling yard was built, the station was moved to its current location closer to Ebersdorf. It was reclassified as a station (Bahnhof) on 2 June 1906.

Freight operations stopped in 1999 and the station has been downgraded to a halt. Apart from two outer platforms, the railway's facilities are no longer used. The entrance building, the waiting room at the second platform as well as the freight sheds still exist, but they are no longer used and have decayed.
