= HKW Chemnitz-Nord =

Building in Chemnitz, Saxony, Germany

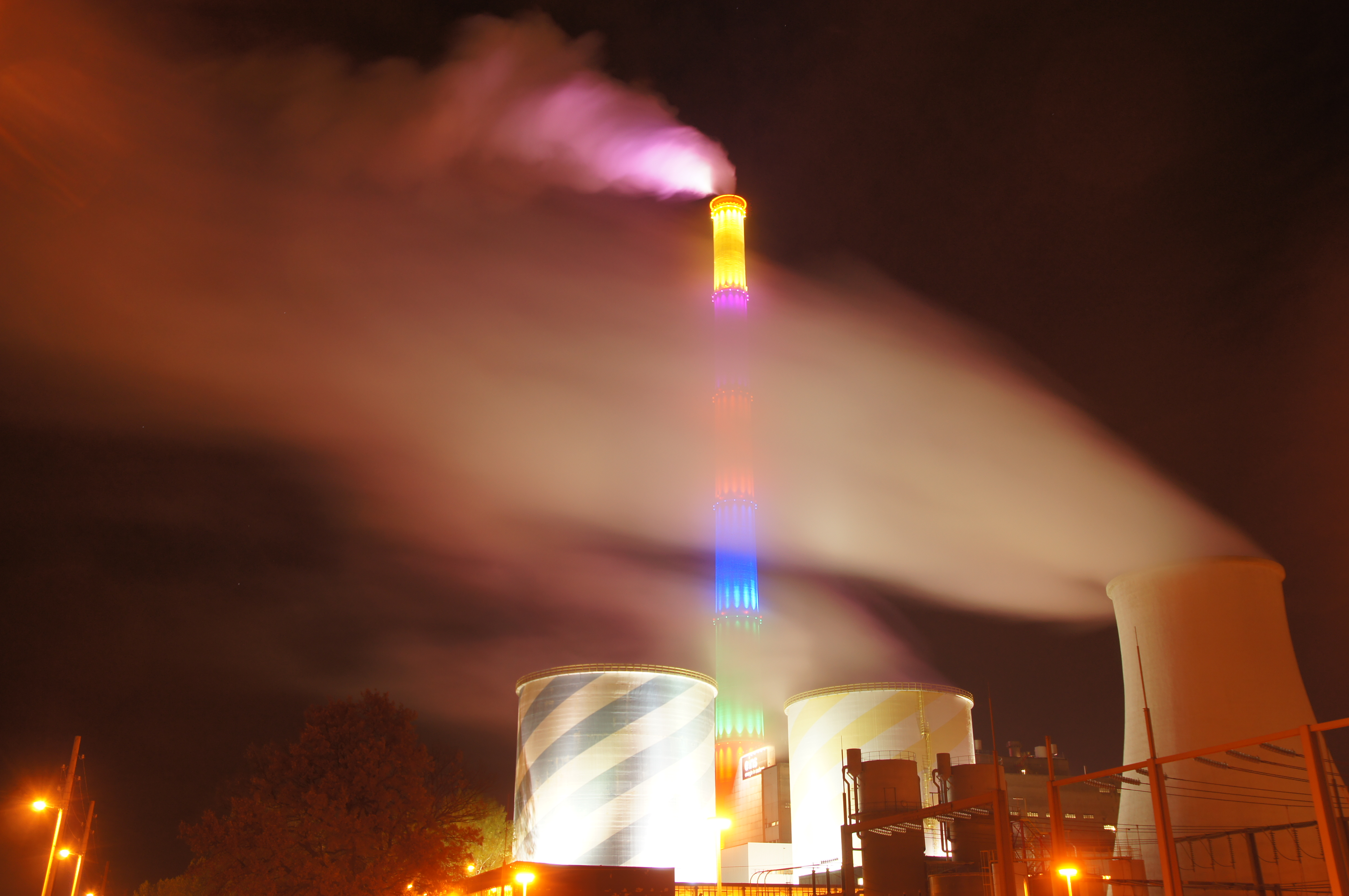
Heizkraftwerk at night

HKW Chemnitz-Nord (abbreviation for Heizkraftwerk Chemnitz) is a lignite-fired power station in the northern parts of Chemnitz with a power capacity of 120 megawatts. It has a 301.8-metre-tall (990 ft) chimney. In 2013 the chimney was painted in pastel colours by Daniel Buren.

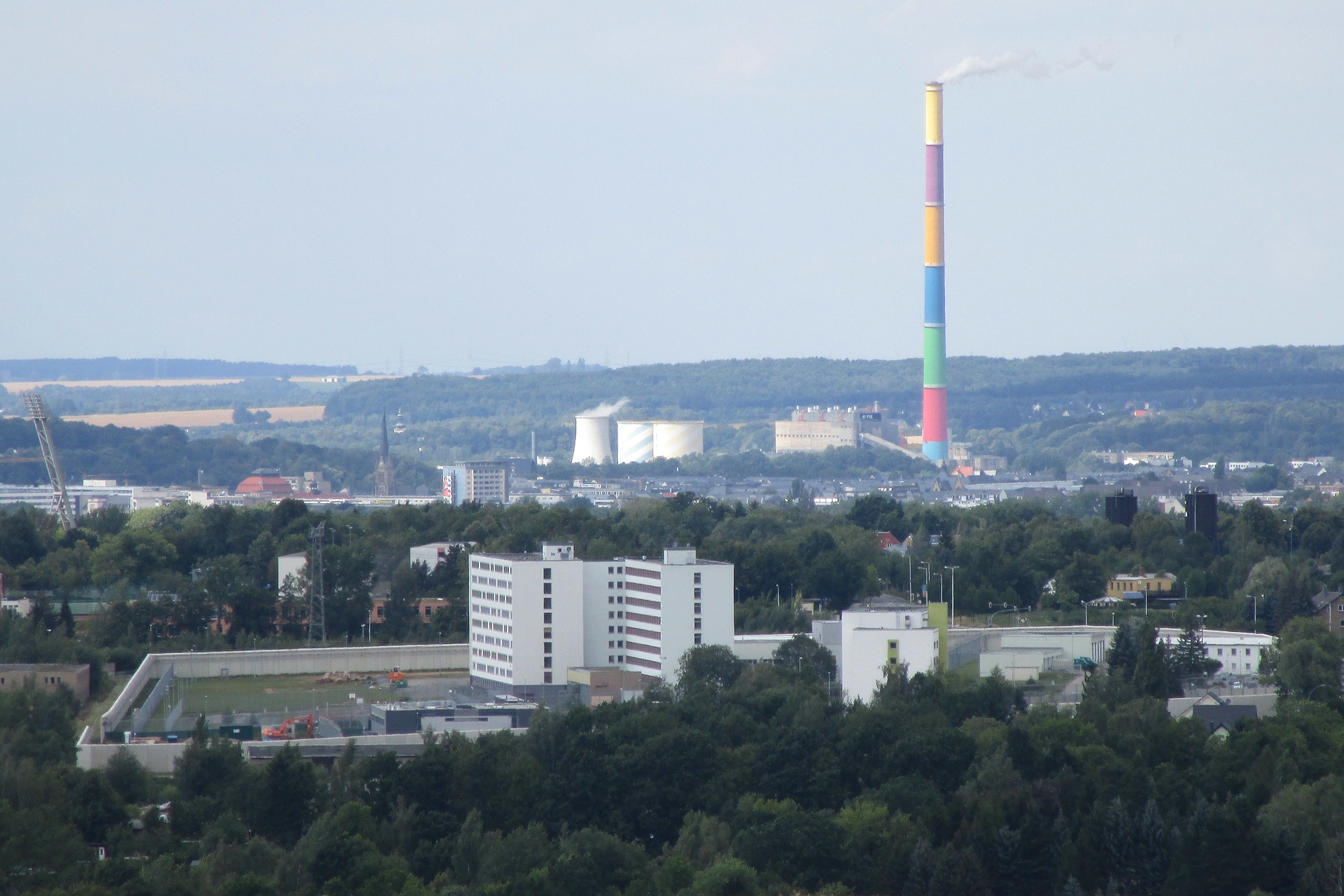
Painted chimney.
