= List of railway stations in Saxony =

This list contains only those stations operated by the DB Station&Service for passenger services. Passenger stations operated by private railways, other privately run stations like container, harbour or logistic stations and DB marshalling yards are not included. The current ranking of stations run by the DB for passenger services in Saxony is as follows:

Station No.	Location	Category
017	Adorf (Vogtl)	5
0179	Arnsdorf (b Dresden)	5
0301	Bad Lausick	5
0335	Bad Schandau	3
0432	Bautzen	4
0599	Beucha	6
0671	Bischofswerda	5
0749	Böhlen (b Leipzig)	6
0750	Böhlen Werke	5
0788	Borna (b Leipzig)	5
0797	Borsdorf (Sachs)	5
	Chemnitz-Borna Hp	6
1040	Chemnitz Hbf	2
1050	Chemnitz-Hilbersdorf Hp	6
	Chemnitz Kinderwaldstätte	6
	Chemnitz Küchwald	6
	Chemnitz Mitte	6
	Chemnitz-Schönau	6
	Chemnitz-Siegmar	6
1044	Chemnitz Süd	5
	Chemnitz Süd Hp	5
1076	Coswig (b Dresden)	3
1084	Crimmitschau	6
1155	Delitzsch oberer Bahnhof	6
1156	Delitzsch unterer Bahnhof	4
1236	Döbeln Hbf	5
8016	Dresden Airport	5
8092	Dresden Bischofsplatz	5
1346	Dresden-Cotta (DCT)	6
8091	Dresden Freiberger Straße	5
1348	Dresden-Friedrichstadt	5
1342	Dresden Grenzstraße	6
1343	Dresden Hbf	1
1344	Dresden Industriegelände	5
1345	Dresden Mitte	4
1347	Dresden-Dobritz	5
1351	Dresden-Klotzsche	4
1352	Dresden-Neustadt	2
1353	Dresden-Niedersedlitz Hp (DHD)	5
1354	Dresden-Pieschen	6
1355	Dresden-Plauen	6
1356	Dresden-Reick	5
1358	Dresden-Strehlen	5
1359	Dresden-Trachau	6
1360	Dresden-Zschachwitz	5
1512	Eilenburg	4
	Eilenburg Ost	5
1513	Eilenburg Ost Bk Hp	5
1758	Falkenstein (Vogtl)	5
1816	Flöha	4
1847	Frankenstein (Sachs)	6
1891	Freiberg (Sachs)	4
1911	Freital-Deuben	4
1912	Freital-Hainsberg	5
1913	Freital-Hainsberg West	6
1914	Freital-Potschappel	5
2048	Geithain	4
2142	Glauchau (Sachs)	3
2143	Glauchau-Schönbörnchen	6
2194	Görlitz	3
2275	Grimma ob Bf	5
2333	Großdeuben	6
2203	Goßdorf-Kohlmühle	7
2340	Großenhain Cottb Bf	5
2435	Gutenfürst	7
2636	Heidenau	4
2637	Heidenau Süd	5
2638	Heidenau-Großsedlitz	5
2714	Herlasgrün	6
2862	Hohenstein-Ernstthal	5
2931	Hoyerswerda	5
2932	Hoyerswerda-Neustadt	
3097	Kamenz	6
3271	Klingenberg-Colmnitz	6
3348	Königsbrück	7
3356	Königstein (Sächs Schweiz) Hp	5
3475	Kurort Rathen (Kr Pirna)	6
3521	Langebrück (Sachs)	5
0146	Leipzig-Anger-Crottendorf	6
1070	Leipzig Coppiplatz	6
6091	Leipzig Allee-Center	5
8018	Leipzig-Engelsdorf Bstg	5
8015	Leipzig/Halle Flughafen	3
3386	Leipzig Grünauer Allee	6
3631	Leipzig Hbf	1
7848	Leipzig Messe	3
	Leipzig Messe Hp	3
4114	Leipzig Miltitzer Allee	6
8275	Leipzig Nord	6
3633	Leipzig Ost	6
8098	Leipzig Wilhelm-Leuschner-Platz	5
5816	Leipzig-Sellerhausen	5
3636	Leipzig-Connewitz	5
3637	Leipzig-Gohlis	4
3113	Leipzig Karlsruher Straße	6
3642	Leipzig-Leutzsch	5
3731	Leipzig-Lindenau	6
3643	Leipzig-Möckern	4
8094	Leipzig-Olbrichtstraße	6
3644	Leipzig-Paunsdorf	5
3645	Leipzig-Plagwitz	5
8096	Leipzig-Slevogtstraße	6
3646	Leipzig-Stötteritz	5
3632	Leipzig Völkerschlachtdenkmal	6
3649	Leipzig-Wahren	5
3751	Löbau (Sachs)	4
3961	Markkleeberg	5
2017	Markkleeberg-Gaschwitz	5
3964	Markkleeberg-Großstädteln	6
4022	Meerane	6
4036	Meißen	5
8277	Meißen Altstadt	5
4037	Meißen-Triebischtal	6
4140	Mittweida	5
4185	Mosel	6
4482	Niederau	6
4403	Neukieritzsch	4
4438	Neusörnewitz	6
4539	Niederwiesa	5
4705	Obervogelgesang (Kr Pirna)	6
4728	Oederan	5
4733	Oelsnitz (Vogtl)	6
4783	Oschatz	5
4943	Pirna	4
4955	Plauen (Vogtl) ob Bf	3
5037	Priestewitz	6
5080	Rackwitz (b Leipzig)	6
5083	Radeberg	4
5084	Radebeul Ost	5
5085	Radebeul-Kötzschenbroda	5
5087	Radebeul-Weintraube	6
5088	Radebeul-Zitzschewig	5
5187	Reichenbach (Vogtl) ob Bf	4
5276	Riesa	3
5574	Schkeuditz	5
8095	Schkeuditz West	6
5936	St Egidien	5
5952	Stadt Wehlen (Sachs)	5
6191	Tharandt	4
6228	Torgau	5
8114	Weinböhla Hp	6
6624	Weischlitz	6
6678	Werdau	4
6950	Wurzen	4
6952	Wüstenbrand	6
7032	Zittau	4
7056	Zschortau	6
7068	Zwickau (Sachs) Hbf	3

All other stations operated by the Deutsche Bahn for passenger services belong to the lowest class 6; other stations are not categorised.

== See also ==
- List of railway stations in Chemnitz
- German railway station categories
- Railway station types in Germany
