= Herlasgrün station =

Railway halt in Pöhl, Germany

Herlasgrün
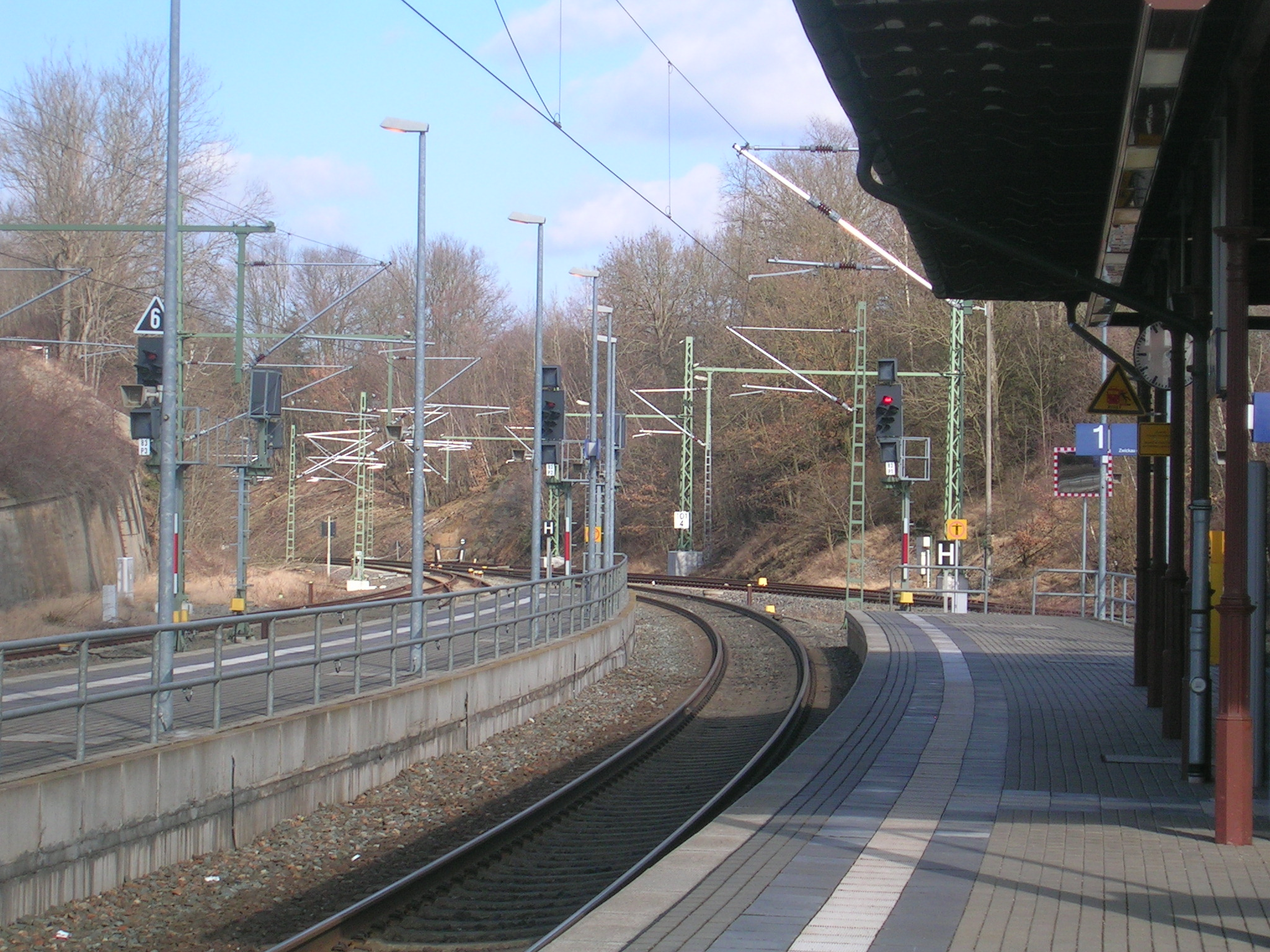
- Herlasgrün station view towards Reichenbach from platform

General information
- Location: Bahnhofstr. 5, Herlasgrün, Saxony; Germany
- Coordinates: 50°34′16″N 12°14′08″E
- Lines: Leipzig–Hof (km 101.554); Herlasgrün–Oelsnitz (km 0.218)
- Platforms: 3

Construction
- Accessible: Yes, except platform 2

Other information
- Station code: 2714
- DS100 code: DHN
- IBNR: 8010166
- Category: 6
- Website: www.bahnhof.de

History
- Opened: 15 July 1851
Location

Herlasgrün station Is a local railway junction in the Pöhl district of Herlasgrün in Vogtland in the German state of Saxony. It is situated on the Leipzig–Hof and the Herlasgrün–Oelsnitz railways.

== History ==
The station was opened on 15 July 1851 along with the Reichenbach–Plauen section of the Leipzig–Hof railway. Originally the station had five tracks: the entrance building and goods facilities with freight sheds, loading ramps and loading roads. With the construction of the Voigtland State Railway (Voigtländische Staatseisenbahn, Herlasgrün–Cheb) starting in 1863, the station infrastructure was extended by two tracks only, since Herlasgrün would remain a relatively insignificant station. Passenger services towards the Elster Mountains starting or terminating in Reichenbach commenced with the opening of the Herlasgrün–Cheb (Eger in German) line on 1 November 1865.

With the construction of the Plauen–Oelsnitz connection, which opened in 1874, Herlasgrün station was significantly expanded as the Oelsnitz–Cheb section was operated in conjunction with the new line. Separate trains were now operated on the Herlasgrün–Falkenstein section. In addition to a new entrance building in the "wedge" between the branching lines, numerous new tracks and a small locomotive depot were built. The old entrance building was used as a residence. In the following decades the station was extended several times, until a larger station upgrade took place in the 1890s. The existing connecting curve between the two railway lines was also established.

Up to 1989/90 individual tracks were removed; large-scale dismantling only started at the end of the 1990s. The only new construction was a platform on the connection curve; today only three tracks still operate on the Leipzig–Hof railway. The station has also lost its former importance as a stop for express trains.

=== Herlasgrün locomotive depot ===
The Herlasgrün locomotive depot, constructed in 1874, consisted of an 11.6-m turntable, a two-storey roundhouse where locomotives were heated (Heizhaus) and a coal shed.

The locomotive depot was disbanded around 1900 with the expansion of the Falkenstein locomotive depot (Bahnbetriebswerk Falkenstein). Most recently, class H III locomotives were stationed here. The locomotive shed was demolished in the 1900s; the turntable remained until the early 1970s.

=== Services ===
The following services stop at the station:

Line	Route	Frequency (min)
RB 2	(Cheb (Eger) – Bad Brambach – Adorf (Vogtl) –) Plauen (Vogtl) ob Bf – Herlasgrün – Werdau – Zwickau (Sachs) Hbf – Zwickau (Zentrum)	60
RB 5	Mehltheuer – Plauen ob Bf – Herlasgrün – Auerbach – Falkenstein – Zwotental – Klingenthal – Kraslice – Sokolov	60
