= Plauen–Cheb line =

Mainline railway in Saxony, Germany and the Czech Republic

Overview
- Line number: 6270

Service
- Route number: DB 544; ČD 147

Technical
- Line length: 73.938 kilometres (45.943 mi)
- Track gauge: 1,435 mm (4 ft 8 1/2 in)
- Minimum radius: 182 m
- Electrification: 25 kV 50 Hz
- Operating speed: 100 km/h
- Maximum incline: 17 ‰

The Plauen–Cheb Line is a mainline railway in Saxony, Germany and the Czech Republic, which was originally built and operated by the Kgl. Sächsischen Staatseisenbahnen (Royal Saxon State Railways). It runs from Plauen im Vogtland through Weischlitz, Adorf und Bad Brambach over the national border to Cheb.

== History ==
=== Planning and construction ===
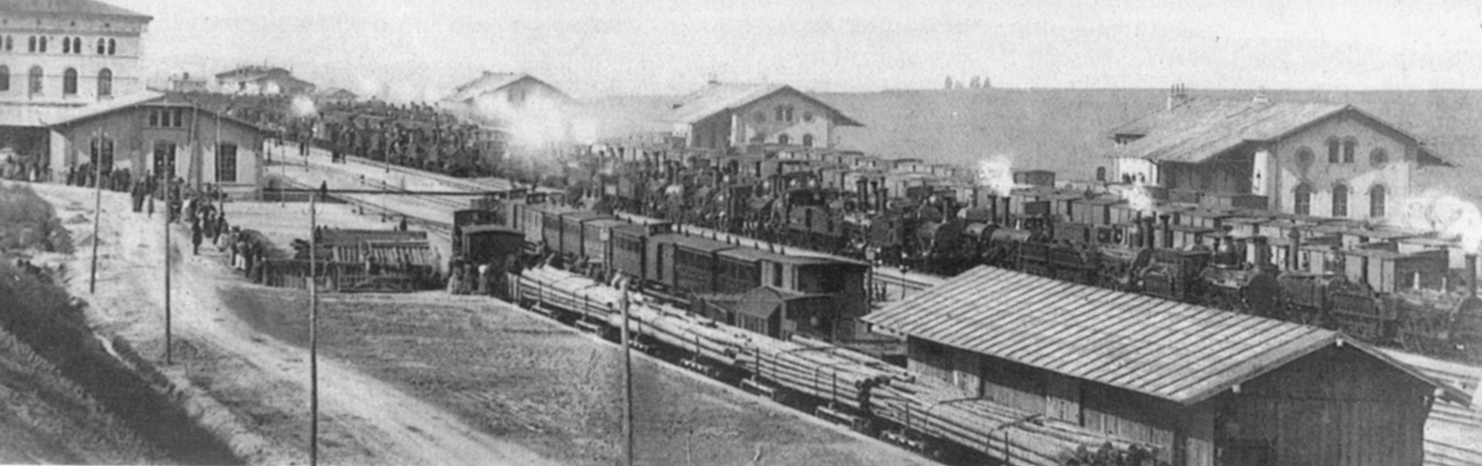
Locomotives of the Royal Saxon State Railways during the escape to Bohemia (Eger) during the Austro-Prussian_War 1866

The origins of the present mainline between Plauen–Cheb stem from the Vogtländischen Staatseisenbahn from Herlasgrün through Falkenstein/Vogtl. and Oelsnitz to Eger, which opened in November 1865. A direct track from Plauen to Bohemia was planned, and in October 1871 work started on the tracks from Plauen to Oelsnitz.

To overcome the height difference between the Saxon-Bavarian Railway and the floor of the White Elster valley a considerable amount of earth had to be moved. In Plauen a large arched viaduct was constructed over the Syra, and on 1 November 1874, the twin-tracked section was opened.

=== Operation ===
The section from Plauen–Eger developed into the most important route from central Germany and Thuringia to Bohemia.

The express trains from Dresden to Munich used the tracks as it was shorter than the route through Hof. After the First World War when Czechoslovakia was formed, the whole line remained in the control of the Royal Saxon State Railways and the subsequent Deutsche Reichsbahn.

=== During World War II ===
After the Anschluss or annexation of Sudetenland in Autumn 1938 the Vojtanov -Františkovy Lázně section became double track.

At the end of the Second World War, the line was the target of heavy American bombing. On 8 April 1945, the station at Cheb was severely bombed so that rail traffic was no longer possible. Photographs from May 1945 show the impact of the bomb explosions and the severely damaged locomotives. On 12 April 1945 the viaduct across Ohře in Cheb was damaged. Till the end of the war the Plauen Oberer Bahnhof station was attacked and almost totally destroyed.

=== Post War ===
At the end of the war on 9 July 1945, the section in the Czech Republic passed over to the Czechoslovak State Railways ČSD. No compensation was received, because it was part of war reparations. The tracks in the German section were given as war reparations to the Soviet Union, and the second track was removed. The viaduct across Ohře in Cheb was replaced with a temporary bridge which remained in place until 19 May 1951 when the bridge had been rebuilt.

Cross border goods traffic resumed in 1957, and passenger trains in the Czech section between Plesná and Cheb. From the start of the 1960s crossborder passenger trains resumed, then an express DR Class VT 18.16 Karlex from Berlin to Karlovy Vary. The goods traffic regained its importance, and the ČSD build a new border station at Vojtanov.

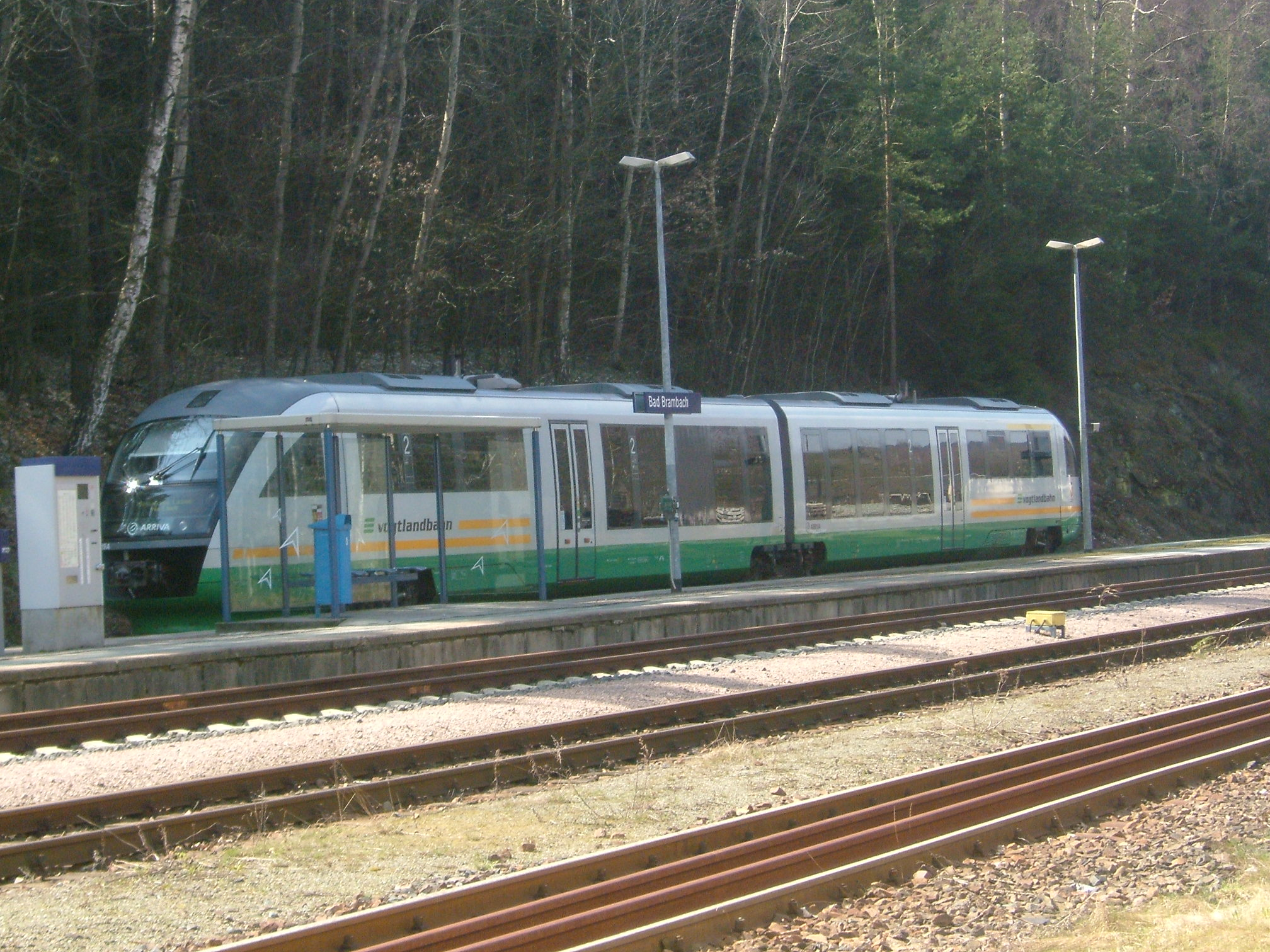
Siemens Desiro, VT19a, operated by the Vogtlandbahn in Bad Brambach station.

From the beginning of the 1980s the Czech section was electrified to the normal southern standard of 25 kV 50 Hz. The tracks between Vojtanov and Cheb went live 17 October 1983. The Deutsche Reichsbahn began to double the tracks in the 1970s, and the section Pirk–Adorf and Raun–Bad Brambach were completed by the end of the 1980s. Though the line is principally used by Regional Express trains there is still a need for some goods traffic. Since 1997 Vogtlandbahn has operated local trains from Zwickau–Bad Brambach, and from 2000 the trains have run over the Czech border to Cheb serving all the intermediate stations.

RegionalExpress-trains of the Deutsche Bahn ran from Leipzig to Bad Brambach, but on the introduction of the Karlex, in the mid-1990s there is no longer a need for this service.

=== Future developments ===
During the 1990s, restoring the second track through Bad Bambrach was discussed and in the long term this may happen. Similarly, it is possible that the line may be electrified- this was tied to the Leipzig City-Tunnel scheme.

== Description of the route ==
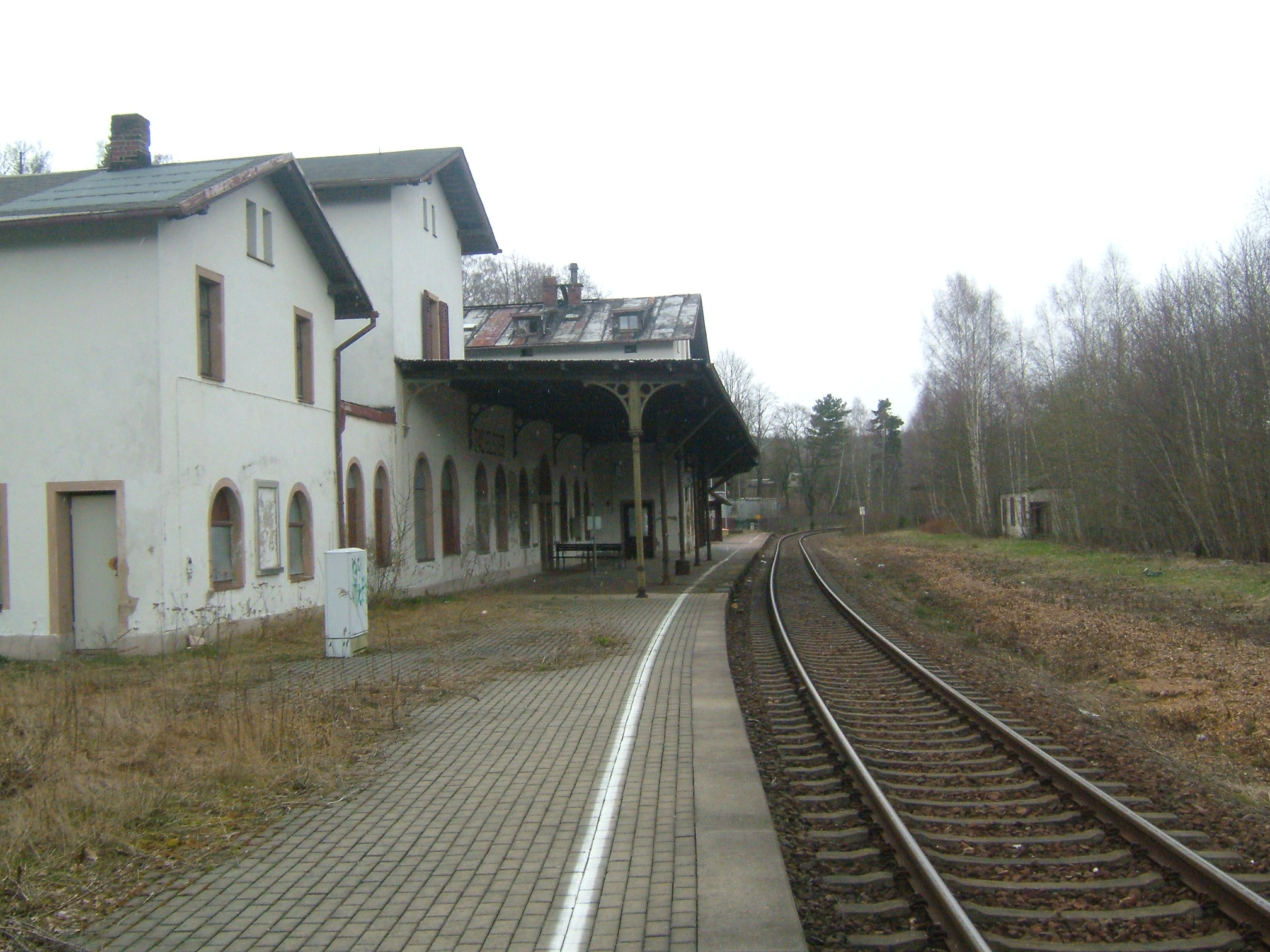
The single track at Bad Elster Halt

From the Oberer Bahnhof (upper station) in Plauen, the route uses the tracks of the Leipzig and Hof line and passes over the Syra Viaduct and reaches the halt on the site of the former Plauen West station. There are seven stations and halts in Plauen, that before July 2008 was not in the Vogtlandkreis. From Kürbitz the tracks run alongside the Elster Valley Railway as far as Weischlitz then follows the White Elster under the motorway bridge that carries the Bundesautobahn 72.

From Pirk station, the section becomes doubled tracked, it passes through Oelsnitz/Vogtl. and on to Adorf/Vogtl. where it joins the tracks of the Chemnitz-Aue-Adorf Line. At Bad Elster the track bed leaves the Elster valley and swings through a series of tight curves through the highlands of the Elster Mountains. Shortly before Bad Brambach the line passes in and out of the Czech territory.

Shortly after Bad Brambach station the tracks cross the Czech border again and reach the Czech station of Plesná, and again pass over to Germany on the south side of the Kapellenberg hills. On a constant gradient the line descends into the Czech border station of Vojtanov. From here, the section is electrified. Shortly after the station there is a junction with the lines from Aš which formed the Cheb–Oberkotzau Line.

More important is the station at the famous spa town of Františkovy Lázně, from here there is an express train to Prague and on into Slovakia.

Shortly before the final station in Cheb, the line passes over the imposing Ohře viaduct, one of the largest bridges built by the Royal Saxon State Railways.
