= Hoher Stein =

Hoher Stein may refer to:

- Hoher Stein (Fichtel Mountains), a rock formation in Bavaria, Germany
- Hoher Stein, a monument in Osterheide, Saxony, Germany
- Vysoký kámen (German: Hoher Stein), a hill in the Czech Republic
