= Herlasgrün–Oelsnitz railway =

Railway line in Germany

Herlasgrün–Oelsnitz (Vogtl) railway
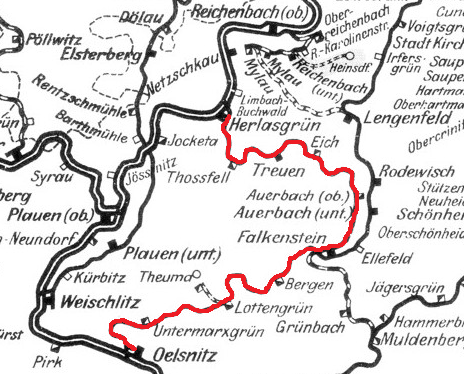
- Extract from Saxon rail map of 1902

Overview
- Line number: 6648
- Locale: Saxony, Germany

Service
- Route number: 539

Technical
- Line length: 47.075 km (29.251 mi)
- Track gauge: 1,435 mm (4 ft 8 1/2 in) standard gauge
- Minimum radius: 221 m (725 ft)
- Operating speed: 80 km/h (49.7 mph) (maximum)
- Maximum incline: 1.3%

The Herlasgrün–Oelsnitz railway is a branch line in the German states of Saxony, which was originally built as a section of the Voigtland State Railway from Herlasgrüner to Cheb. It starts at the junction station of Herlasgrüner on the Leipzig–Hof railway and runs via Auerbach to Falkenstein. The southern part of the line from Falkenstein via Bergen to Oelsnitz was closed in 1951.

== History ==
The Herlasgrün-Oelsnitz line was opened in 1865 as part of the Voigtland State Railway (German: Voigtländischen Staatseisenbahn) from Herlasgrün to Cheb (then a mainly German speaking city called Eger in the Kingdom of Bohemia, which formed part of the Austrian Empire). The track was opened on 1 November 1865.

In 1874, when a connecting line was opened from Plauen to Oelsnitz, traffic between Herlasgrüner and Oelsnitz via Falkenstein decreased dramatically, because now all through traffic ran on the shorter and faster line via Plauen. The former main line was reclassified as a secondary line on 15 October 1878.

Because of the low traffic volume, it was decided in 1951 to dismantle the Lottengrün–Oelsnitz section in favour of so-called priority projects. Arguing that the rail track was needed for the construction of the Berlin outer ring, the line was closed on 27 April 1951 and the track was dismantled a little later.

The section between Falkenstein and Lottengrün remained in operation until 1970 / 72 as part of the Falkenstein–Plauen line. On 26 September 1970, the line was closed for passenger traffic; freight traffic continued to serve the slate quarries in Theuma until the autumn of 1972.

In 1978, the track between the 24.6 km mark and Lottengrün station was dismantled. The remaining track from Falkenstein to the 24.6 km mark was still operated as a siding of the Wismut uranium mine. In subsequent years, this track was used for the parking of damaged wagons bound for the Zwickau repair shop. It is also used during the 1996 upgrading of the junction in Falkenstein.

In the mid-1990s, the remaining section of the line, which connected Reichenbach and Zwickau to Adorf and Klingenthal, was selected by the state of Saxony as a pilot project for the revitalisation of endangered branch lines. After an extensive renewal of the track in 1996 / 97 the line speed was raised to 80 km/h. Since 1997, the line has only been served by regional services operated by the private Vogtlandbahn company.

The disused Falkenstein–Oelsnitz section has been converted to a cycle route, which was opened in May 2011.
