= Werdau wye =

Coordinates: 50°42′42″N 12°22′44″E

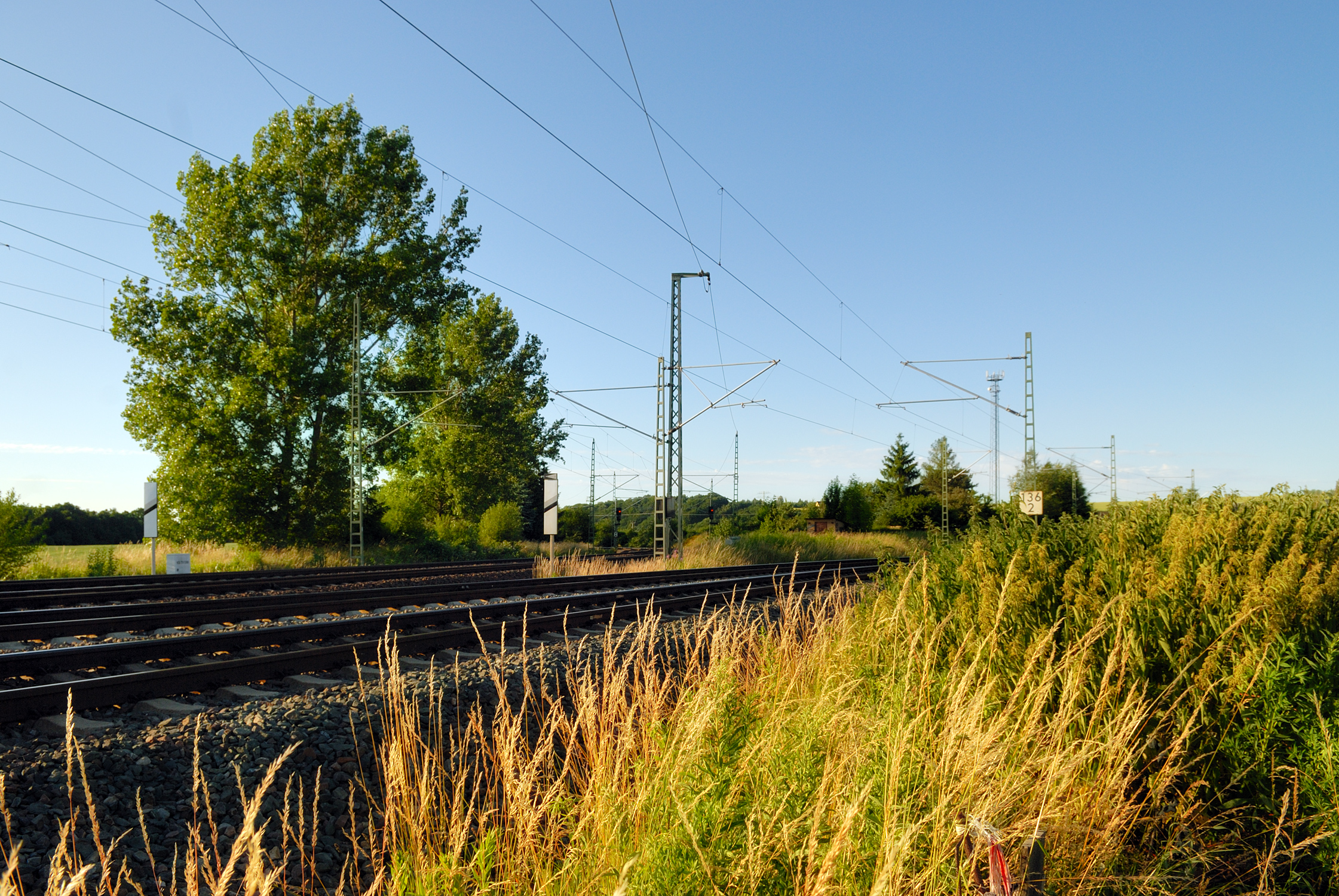
The Neumark separation, the tracks from Leipzig are to the left, the tracks from Dresden are to the right (2008)

Werdau wye junction (Abzweig Werdau Bogendreieck) is a wye junction near Werdau in west Saxony, Germany where the Dresden–Werdau railway meets the Leipzig–Hof railway (at line-kilometre 135.96).

There are gardens in the area of the wye, but no station. Passengers can change between trains in Werdau, Zwickau, Lichtentanne, Reichenbach in the Vogtland or Neumark.

== History ==
With the completion by the Sächsisch-Bayerische Eisenbahn-Compagnie (Saxon-Bavarian Railway Company, from 1847: Königlich Sächsische Staatseisenbahnen—Royal Saxon State Railways) of the railway from Leipzig to Werdau (Leipzig–Hof railway) on 6 September 1845, the 8.10 km-long branch to Zwickau was also opened. With the further commissioning of the line towards Reichenbach on 31 May 1846, a junction was opened that later developed into Werdau wye.

Three different connecting points had originally been considered for the connection to the Albertsbahn (Albert Railway), which opened in Dresden in 1855. The stations of Werdau and Gößnitz were considered important as connecting points for the coal traffic from the Lugau-Oelsnitz coal district. Werdau was ideally situated for direct trains to the south towards Hof, but Gößnitz was preferable for connecting to Leipzig. A third variant, Crimmitschau was also investigated as a connection point. Ultimately, a route to Zwickau and a connecting line branching off from Schönbörnchen near Glauchau was selected. Construction began on the connecting railway on 25 June 1855 and construction of the main line towards Zwickau began on 15 November 1855. The two new lines were opened on 15 November 1858. The double-tracked Zwickau–Neumark connecting curve had already been opened at the former Werdau junction on 1 January 1856.

More than ten years later, on 1 March 1869, the continuous connection from Dresden was completed with the closure of the gap between Freiberg and Flöha. Since then, the Werdau wye has had more than regional importance as a connecting point for rail transport between Silesia and Southern Germany.

At the beginning of October 1989 there were massive, violent attacks by the Volkspolizei (East German police) on people waving and cheering the trains carrying refugees from the West German Embassy in Prague to West Germany.

== Multi-regional importance ==
With its connection between the Dresden–Werdau and Leipzig–Hof railway lines, the Werdau wye has a significance that extends beyond Saxony. It is part of the Saxon-Franconian trunk line (Sachsen-Franken-Magistrale) and is included in the plans for the Mid-Germany Railway (Mitte-Deutschland-Verbindung).
