= Chemnitz Süd station =

Railway station and halt in Chemnitz, Germany

Chemnitz Süd
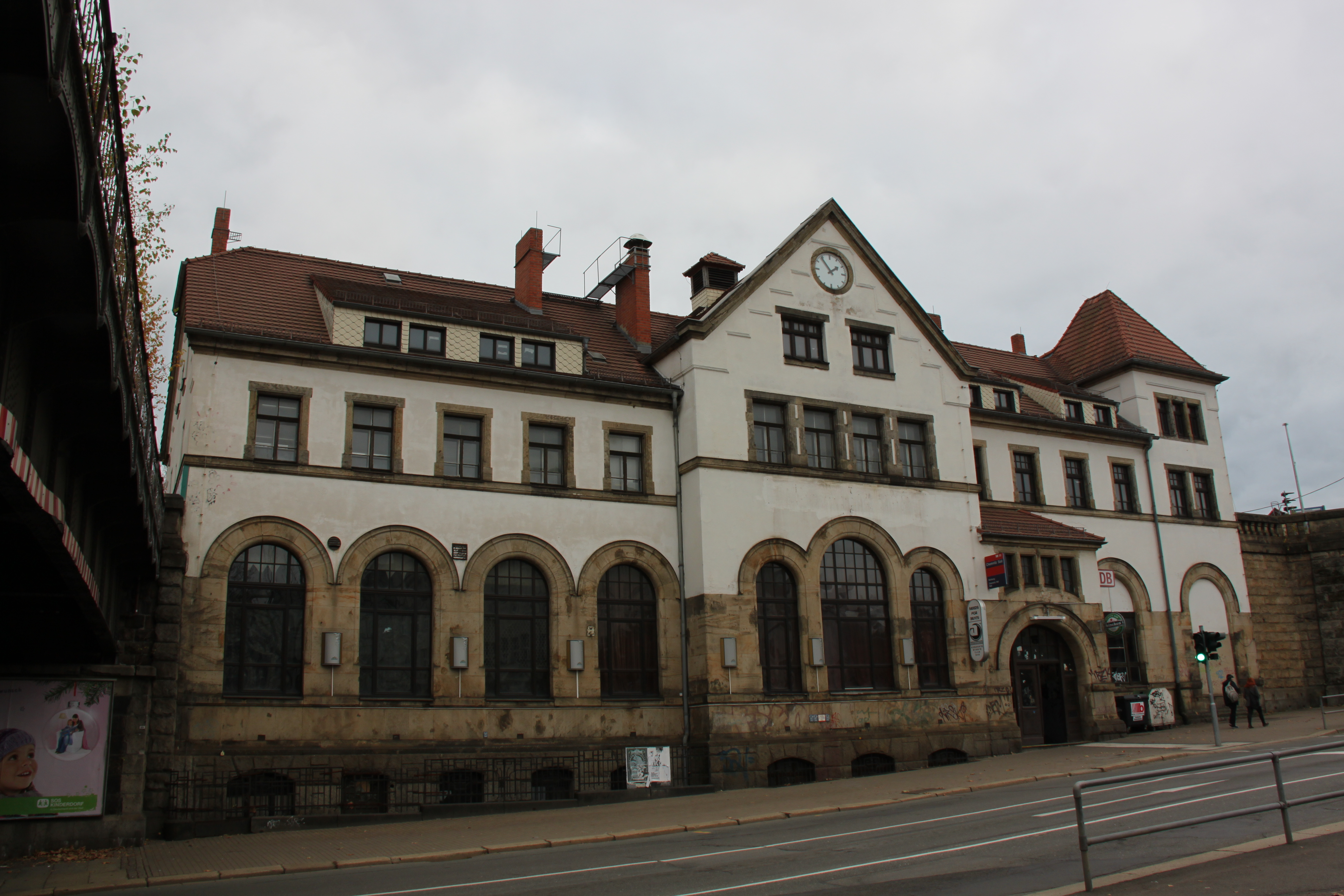
- Station building between Dresden–Werdau and Chemnitz–Adorf railway

General information
- Location: Reichenhainer Str. 1, Chemnitz, Saxony; Germany
- Coordinates: 50°49′25″N 12°55′37″E
- Lines: Chemnitz–Adorf (km 1.99); Zwönitz–Chemnitz Süd (km 37.96); Dresden–Werdau (km 81.83)
- Platforms: 4

Construction
- Accessible: Yes

Other information
- Station code: 1044
- DS100 code: DCS (station), DCD (halt)
- IBNR: 8010185
- Category: 5
- Website: www.bahnhof.de

History
- Opened: 1875

Services
Preceding station	Mitteldeutsche Regiobahn	Following station
Chemnitz Mitte towards Zwickau Hbf	RB 30	Chemnitz Hbf towards Dresden Hbf
Location

Chemnitz Süd (south) station is a station in the city of Chemnitz in the German state of Saxony. The station used to have a greater significance in freight transport in particular. It is located at the Dresden–Werdau railway as a halt and at the Chemnitz–Adorf railway as a railway station where the Zwönitz–Chemnitz Süd railway branches off.

== History ==
=== Name ===
The station had three different names during its existence:

- until 31 January 1905: Altchemnitz (old Chemnitz)
- from 1 February 1905: Chemnitz Süd
- from 1953: Karl-Marx-Stadt Süd (Chemnitz was called Karl-Marx-Stadt from 1953 to 1990)
- from 1990: Chemnitz Süd

=== Operations ===
The station was built with the Chemnitz–Adorf railway by the Chemnitz-Aue-Adorfer Eisenbahn-Gesellschaft (Chemnitz–Aue–Adorf Railway Company, CAAE) and opened in 1875. The station was not built during the building of the Chemnitz–Zwickau section of the Dresden–Werdau railway, which had been opened in 1858. Since the CAAE was not allowed to build its line to Chemnitz station — from 1 May 1904 called Chemnitz Hauptbahnhof — a separate station was built in Altchemnitz. A link line was built for freight transport, but passengers had to walk about 2 km to Chemnitz station on foot. It was only after the nationalisation of the CAAE in the summer of 1876 that passenger trains were able to run to Chemnitz station.

The Stollberg–Chemnitz section of the Zwönitz–Chemnitz Süd railway (also called the Würschnitztalbahn—Würschnitz Valley Railway), which opened on 1 October 1895, also connected with the station and the station's traffic increased significantly.

Since the numerous level crossings between the Chemnitz and Kappel stations were an ever-increasing obstacle to traffic, between 1903 and 1909 the route of the line was significantly changed and parts of the line was lowered or raised. In this context, the old passenger platforms near line-kilometre 2.47 of the Chemnitz-Adorf railway were removed and new passenger infrastructure was built near line-kilometre 1.99 (from Chemnitz Hbf). Since then, passenger trains on the Dresden-Werdau railway have also stopped in Chemnitz Süd. As part of the reconstruction work, a new entrance building was also built as a Keilbahnhof ("wedge station", that is in the wedge between the branching tracks).

Chemnitz South freight yard (Chemnitz Süd Gbf) was established as an operating point on 1 June 1920 with the separation of the freight facility from the Chemnitz Süd station because the station's rail traffic had continued to increase. In 1924, the freight infrastructure was once again extensively expanded. This resulted in the creation of a new freight shed with eight slanted terminal tracks called "teeth".

At the end of the Second World War, large sections of both the passenger and freight areas were destroyed in Allied air raids in 1945, including the goods sheds and the old entrance building. The new entrance building and the platforms were only slightly damaged.

After 40 years of operation, the two services were recombined in Karl-Marx-Stadt Süd station on 1 June 1960.

Due to the economic impact of Die Wende and the associated decline in traffic, the significance of the station decreased. Thus no rolling stock maintenance has been carried out since 1995 and the ticket office was closed in 1996. Numerous railway tracks were closed and later dismantled. The entrance building now serves as a concert and events venue. It was listed for auctioning in the spring of 2013.

The station also had some factory sidings, but have been closed.
