= Werdau station =

Railway halt in Werdau, Germany

Werdau
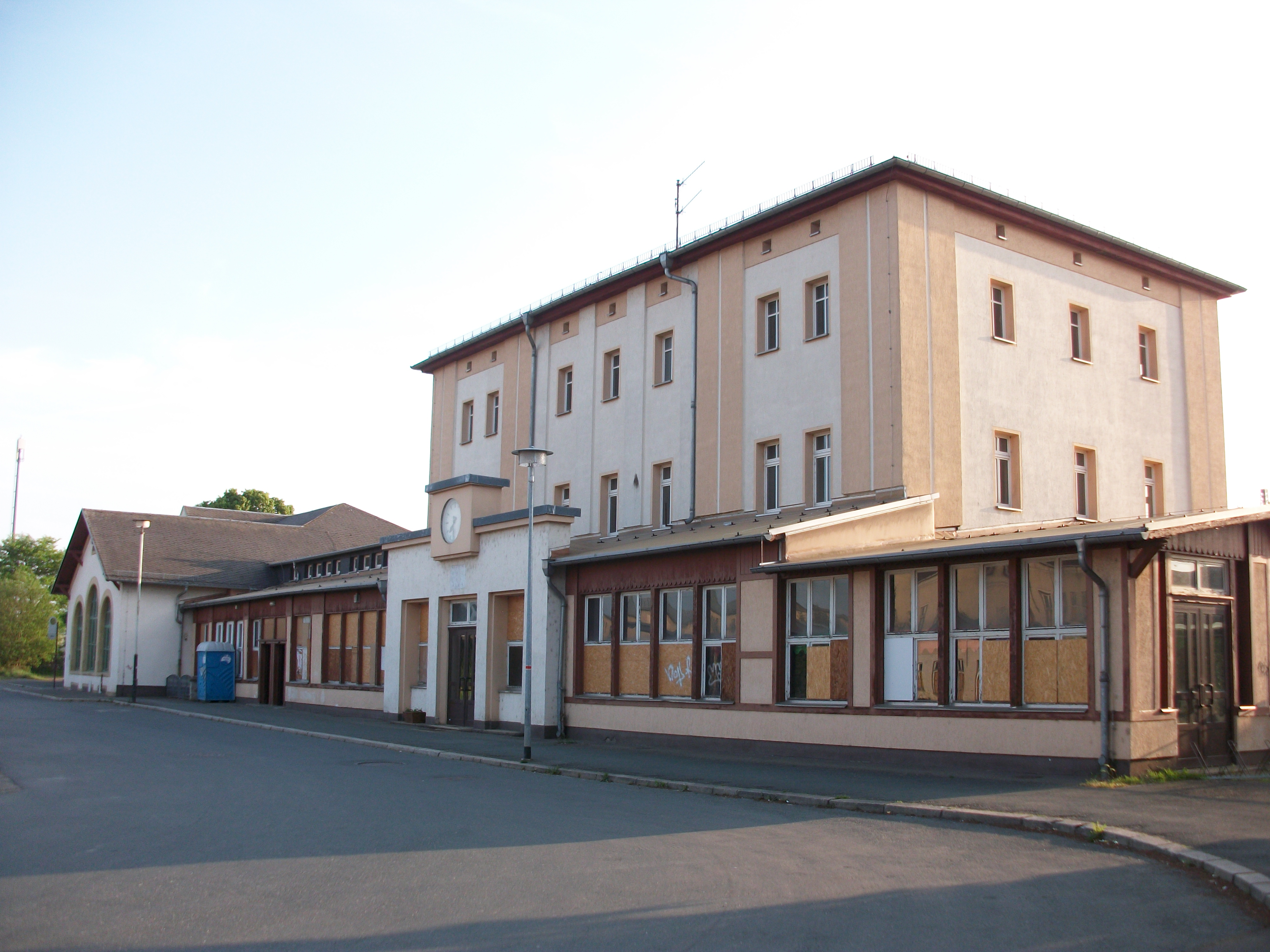
- Former entrance building, demolished in 2023

General information
- Location: Bahnhofstr. 1, Werdau, Saxony; Germany
- Coordinates: 50°43′32″N 12°22′02″E
- Lines: Leipzig–Hof (km 73.81); Werdau–Mehltheuer (km 0.0)
- Platforms: 4

Construction
- Accessible: Yes

Other information
- Station code: 6678
- DS100 code: DWR
- IBNR: 8010372
- Category: 4
- Fare zone: VMS: 61
- Website: www.bahnhof.de

History
- Opened: 6 September 1845

Services
Preceding station	Vogtlandbahn	Following station
Neumark (Sachs) towards Adorf (Vogtl) or Cheb	RB 2	Steinpleis towards Zwickau Zentrum
Preceding station	Mitteldeutschland S-Bahn	Following station
Werdau Nord towards Halle (Saale) Hbf	S 5	Steinpleis towards Zwickau Hbf
Markkleeberg-Großstädteln towards Halle (Saale) Hbf	S 5x	Steinpleis towards Zwickau Hbf
Location

Werdau station is a station on the Leipzig–Hof railway in Werdau in the German state of Saxony. Until 2000, the Werdau–Mehltheuer railway branched off here, but this section of the line is now closed.

== History ==
The station was opened in 1845. Traffic on the line south of the station ran over the wye junction towards Reichenbach im Vogtland, Hof, Munich and the Allgäu as well as towards Zwickau, Chemnitz and Dresden. It is one of the oldest railway stations in Saxony.

The branch line to Wünschendorf, also called the Thüringer Waldbahn (Thuringian Forest Railway), was opened in 1876. A new station building was opened in 1877 and it was extended in 1907. It has a stuccoed dining room, railway apartments, a luggage handling facility and a railway post office, as well as houses for the station staff.

Around 1900, the station was rebuilt and the route to Wünschendorf changed. Instead of connecting to the station from the south, it now entered from the north, connecting to the Leipzig–Hof railway at a flying junction with a track of the line to Wünschendorf built above the Plauen–Leipzig line.

Werdau became a rail junction, an important center with a locomotive depot (Bahnbetriebswerk) and a carriage works. There was also a locomotive shed. Werdau became a leading industrial city.

Passenger traffic to Wünschendorf was discontinued in 1999. Subsequently, some facilities were dismantled. The flying junction north of the station was removed, a road bypass was built without abridge over the path of the railway, so the line is now broken between Werdau West and Werdau.

An electronic interlocking was put into operation in 1999.

In 2014, the town council resolved that the historic station building, which was partly renovated up to 2003, should be demolished to build a public transport interchange, with construction costs totalling just over €3m. The heritage protection of the station was lifted in 2016. Many citizens have signed a petition to preserve the station. The civic association Wir in Werdau Süd e.V. ("We in Werdau South"), which stands for the preservation of Werdau station was founded in 2016.

The demolition of the station building was announced at the beginning of 2020. Preparatory measures for construction were carried out by the end of the year and the actual demolition and redesign of the area were planned for 2021. Funds amounting to a total of €3.5m were approved, of which the municipality contributed €600,000. The actual demolition of the entrance building took place in October 2023, after a citizens' initiative was able to temporarily stop the demolition in spring 2023.

In the 2023 timetable, services to Werdau were operated as lines S5 and S5X of the S-Bahn Mitteldeutschland (Halle (Saale) Hbf–Zwickau (Sachs) Hbf) and line RB2 was operated by the Vogtlandbahn (Zwickau (Sachs) Hbf–Cheb). The trains of the RB2 service reverse in Werdau to continue their journeys.

== Infrastructure ==
The tracks are accessed through the historic railway station. In 2000, direct railway access to platform 1, the Werdau–Mehltheuer railway platform, was removed and the other platforms (tracks 1–4, now only having access through the station hall) were modernised. Before modern development, access to the railway tracks was also possible directly from the street. New doors, windows, floors, false ceilings, a disabled toilet, a new heating system, a new ticket vending machines as well as a renovated retail area in the former luggage storage area were built up to 2000.

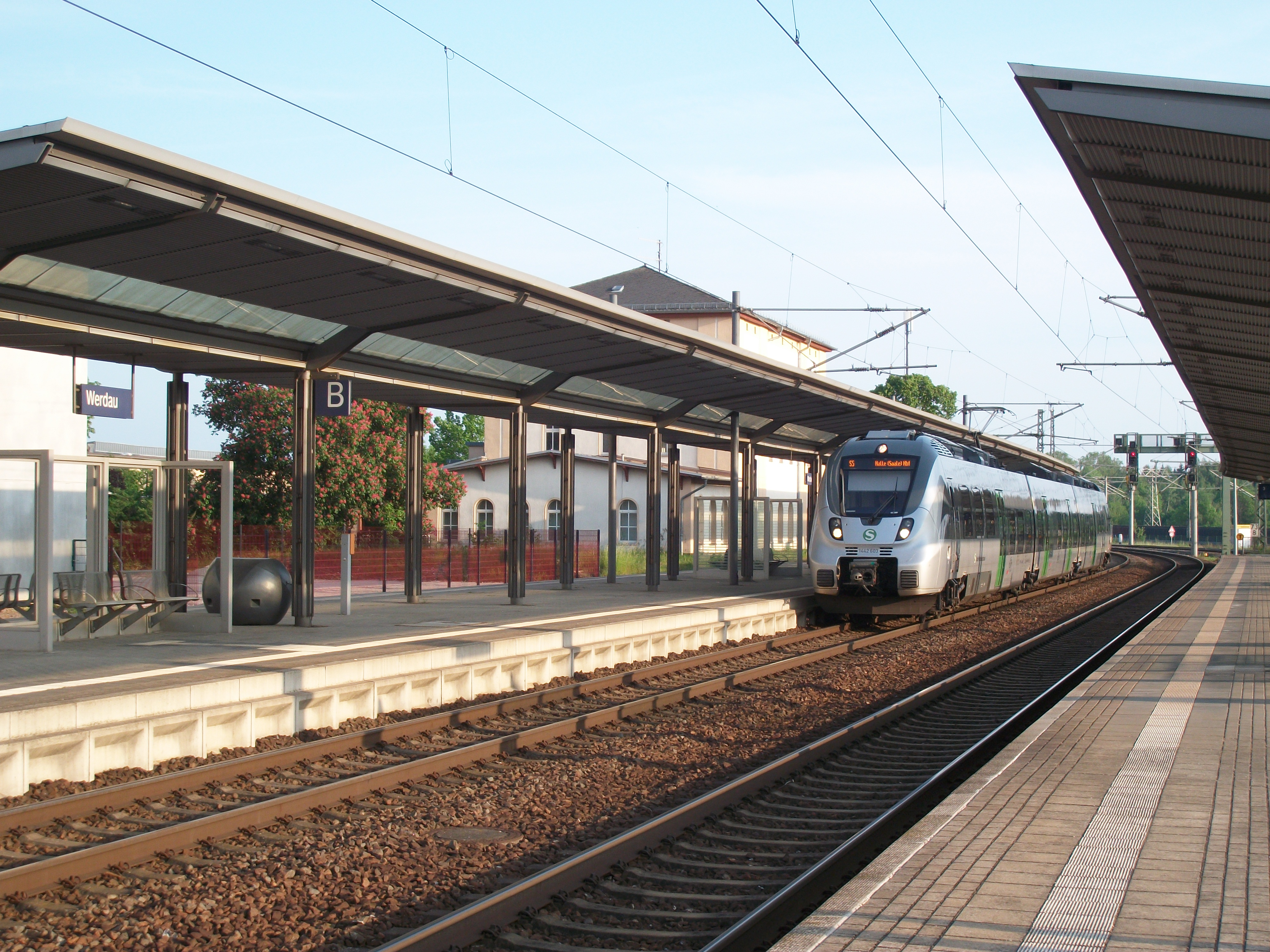
Platforms (2016)

== Connections ==
Werdau has bus stops in front of the historic station building. Daily, three or four buses stop next to the footpath in front of the station entrance. Buses can also stop in front of the former dining room. There are also several large covered bus stops, as well as a covered taxis area just in front of the historic station.

There are about 50 parking spaces at the station building. State road 289 is to the west of the station, but it is not directly accessible.

=== Services ===
Line	Route	Frequency (min)	Operator
RB 2	(Cheb (Eger) – Františkovy Lázně (Franzensbad) – Bad Brambach – Bad Elster – Adorf (Vogtl) –) Plauen (Vogtl) ob Bf – Werdau – Zwickau (Sachs) Hbf – Zwickau (Zentrum)	60	Die Länderbahn
S 5	Halle – Flughafen Leipzig/Halle – Leipzig – Leipzig-Connewitz – Böhlen – Altenburg – Lehndorf – Gößnitz – Crimmitschau – Werdau – Zwickau	60	DB Regio Südost
S 5X	Halle – Flughafen Leipzig/Halle – Leipzig – Leipzig-Connewitz – Altenburg – Gößnitz – Crimmitschau – Werdau – Zwickau	60	DB Regio Südost
