= Voigtland State Railway =

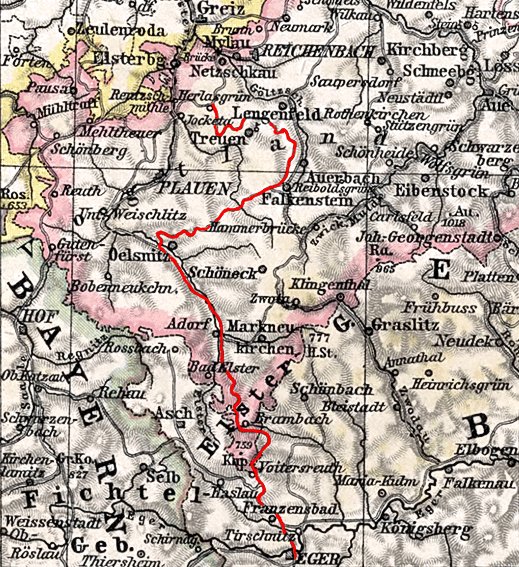
Map of the Voigtland State Railway (1905)

The Voigtland State Railway (German: Voigtländische Staatseisenbahn, abbreviated as Voigtl. Sts. E. B.) was originally one of the lines of the Royal Saxon State Railways that was built in Vogtland, now in the German state of Saxony and the Czech Republic. The line began from the junction station of Herlasgrün on the Saxon-Bavarian Railway and ran via Falkenstein, Oelsnitz and Bad Elster to Cheb (then a mainly German speaking city called Eger in the Kingdom of Bohemia, which formed part of the Austrian Empire). Only the Herlasgrün–Falkenstein and Oelsnitz–Cheb sections are still operating.

== History ==
During the construction of the Saxon-Bavarian Railway, a route running further south in Vogtland through Lengenfeld and Auerbach was discussed. In 1856 proposals were developed for a branch line of the Saxon-Bavarian Railway towards Bohemia. In November 1856, a railway committee of Oelsnitz proposed a railway link through the Elster valley from Gera via Plauen, Adorf, Elster and Asch to Eger. A committee established in Auerbach, however, later proposed the variation as built from Herlasgrün.

In the autumn of 1858 the engineering work began on a railway from Plauen, which were interrupted during the Franco-Austrian War of 1859. Only when it was known in Saxony that another project, the Hof–Eger line was being developed in Bavaria, did interest return to the project. Now, however, the link from Herlasgrün via Auerbach and Falkenstein was favoured. On 21 June 1861, the Saxon parliament approved construction of the Voigtland State Railway via Auerbach.

Shortly afterwards, surveying began on the new line. Major problems were experienced on the route through the Bohemian area, where the communities of Fleißen and Wildstein opposed the construction of the line. The necessary land was so overpriced that the route eventually chosen ran south of the Kapellenberg (mountain) returning to Saxony for a while.

Later the town of Eger withdrew its financial commitment for the construction of the line. To minimise the cost it was ultimately decided to build a common route with the Hof–Eger line in Bohemia.

On 1 June 1863, construction began on the line with pre-construction work. On 25 November 1863, the foundation stone was laid for the Eger Viaduct. Finally, in June 1864 about 9,000 workers were employed on the project.

For the construction and operation of the section of the railway located in the territory of the Austrian Empire between Voithersreuth (Vojtanov) and Eger and financed by the Royal Saxon Government, a treaty was signed between Austria and Saxony in Vienna on 30 November 1864 (which was ratified four weeks later), providing for a connecting with the Bohemian railway network. The treaty provided for the connection of the Voithersreuth–Cheb line with the Waldsassen-Eger line built by the Bavarian Eastern Railway Company.

On 1 November 1865, the line opened at the same time as the Hof–Eger line. The cost of the construction of the Voigtland State Railway was later given as a total of 6.1 million Vereinsthalers.

Especially in Plauen and Oelsnitz there were demands for more from a direct line from Plauen, as had been agreed in 1856. The Plauen city council on several occasions made petitions to the Saxon government for the construction of this line. On 7 May 1868, the Plauen–Oelsnitz line was approved by the parliament of Saxony. On 1 November 1874 the line was opened.
