= Kaltenbach (White Elster) =

River of Saxony, Germany

Location
- Country: Germany
- States: Saxony

Physical characteristics
- Mouth
  - location: White Elster
  - coordinates: 50.5450°N 12.1686°E

Basin features
- Progression: White Elster→ Saale→ Elbe→ North Sea

The Kaltenbach is a river of Saxony, Germany. It is a left tributary of the White Elster, which it joins near Pöhl.

== See also ==
- List of rivers of Saxony
