= Chemnitz–Adorf railway =

Railway line in Saxony, Germany

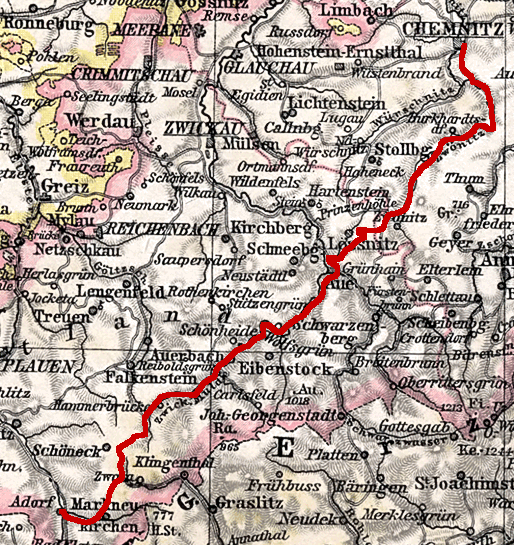

Overview
- Line number: 6645/6663; Saxon CA

Service
- Route number: 524, 539

Technical
- Line length: 114.59 km (71.20 mi)
- Track gauge: 1,435 mm (4 ft 8 1/2 in)
- Minimum radius: 193 m (633 ft)
- Operating speed: 80 km/h (50 mph)
- Maximum incline: 25 ‰

The Chemnitz–Adorf railway is a branch line in Saxony, Germany that was built and operated by the Chemnitz-Aue-Adorfer Eisenbahn-Gesellschaft (CAAE). The 115 km long line originally ran from Chemnitz in a southwesterly direction along the valley of the River Zwönitz to Aue. From Aue the line ran along the Zwickauer Mulde to Muldenberg and up to Schöneck and through Markneukirchen to Adorf in Vogtland.

The line was cut in two by the construction of the Eibenstock dam reservoir in 1975. The two truncated end sections are still in use, with the Vogtlandbahn railway company operating over the south western section from Adorf to Muldenburg, and the City-Bahn Chemnitz railway company operating the Chemnitz to Aue section under the name Zwönitz Valley Railway (German: Zwönitztalbahn).

== History ==
=== Background and Construction ===
In July 1872 the Chemnitz-Aue-Adorfer Eisenbahn-Gesellschaft gained the concession to build and operate a railway line from Chemnitz through Aue und Schöneck to Adorf in Vogtland. The Sächsische Eisenbahnbaugesellschaft were given the contract to construct the line, but there were financial difficulties so suddenly, in 1874, the contract was taken back in house. The topology of the line presented challenges but the work was completed by 15 November 1875. The Zwickauer Mulde valley section between Aue–Eibenstock–Schöneck/Vogtl. was ready for opening on 7 September 1875. On 24 December 1875 the complementary line, the 8 km long Zweigbahn from Zwotental to the Czech border at Klingenthal was opened. Here it joined to the Falkenau–Graslitz(–Border) line of the Buschtiehrader Eisenbahn. But even in the first year of operation, the takings were below expectation and the company sold the line on 15 July 1876 to the Saxony government. This was the end of the CAAE and their planned extension to Hof in Bavaria.

=== Operations ===
The Royal Saxon State Railways ran the line under the name CA (taking the letters from Chemnitz and Adorf). A planned extension was never implemented. Due to the unfavourable topology of the line, with long climbs and tight corners in the region of Lössnitz and Schöneck, made it unsuitable for heavy goods trains. The short section between Aue und Zwönitz was known as the Sächsischer Semmering, the line climbed 255 m.

In 1920 the Chemnitz-Aue-Adorfer railway passed to the newly formed Deutsche Reichsbahn. After World War II regional express trains ran from Dresden and Chemnitz to Adorf. On 1 March 1967 the former mainline was reclassified as a branch line.

=== Extensions ===
From 1899 to 1970 a goods line ran from Zwönitz to Stollberg to bring the coal from the Oelsnitzer Revier in the Ore Mountains. The track was removed on closure.

In 1900, it was extended through Beierfeld und Elterlein to Scheibenberg. This line fell to the Soviet Union as a war reparation and was closed and removed in 1945.

The district capital of Auerbach was connected to the line in 1891/92 by means of a short connection from Falkenstein/Vogtl. and Muldenberg. On 15 November 1892 the line was opened and it is still in use today by the Vogtlandbahn as part of the Zwickau–Kraslice route.

Only a short connecting line was needed from the CA-Linie to the town Eibenstock which was opened in 1905 and ran until 5 October 1975. This was the most precipitous line in Saxony with a gradient of 1:20 or 50 ‰.

A further extension was from Siebenbrunn to Erlbach, this gave a direct connection to Markneukirchen. Traffic ran to Markneukirchen from 20 September 1910, and to Erlbach from 1 October 1911. The line closed 1 June 1975.

=== Contraction ===
In 1975 the section between Wolfsgrün und Schönheide was permanently cut by the successful construction of the Talsperre Eibenstock reservoir. The last train between Adorf and Karl-Marx-Stadt (Chemnitz) was on 27 September 1975, as was the last train on the short stretch to Eibenstock ob. Bf. Passenger trains continued between Karl-Marx-Stadt and Blauenthal, and also between Schönheide Ost und Adorf. The service between Schönheide Ost and Schönheide Süd finished 1 January 1979. The section to Muldenberg closed on 23 May 1982. Goods traffic continued to Schönheide ost until 1995. The passenger service from Aue to Blauenthal was also withdrawn in 1995.

=== Reorganisation ===
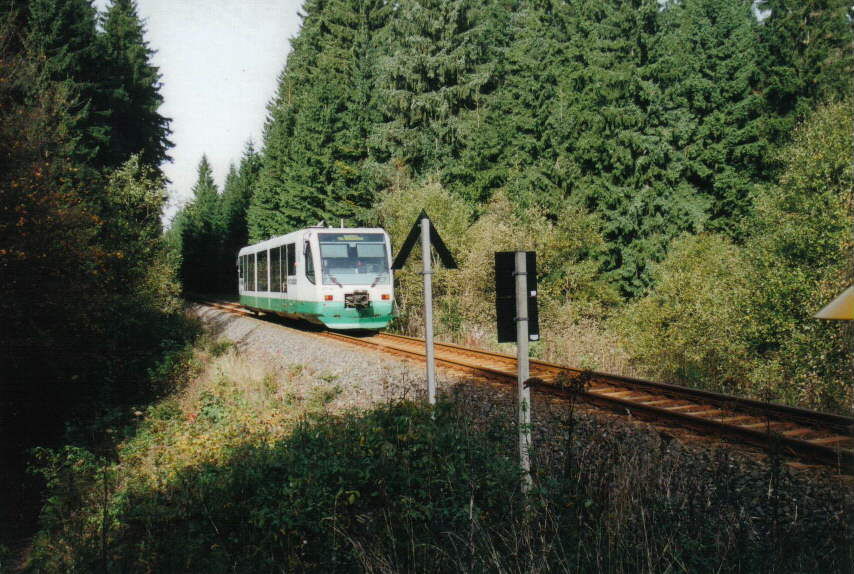
Vogtlandbahn RegioSprinter near Schöneck

The Vogtlandbahn has been running trains on this section from Muldenberg to Adorf since 1997. As part of regeneration project for derelict lines in 1996, the tracks were rebuilt to 80 km/h standard. This section is used by VB5 Hof- Plauen - Falkenstein - Adorf, using Duewag RegioSprinter train sets.

Then in 2002 the section from Chemnitz to Aue was opened by the DB Erzgebirgsbahn, and in 2003 this section was upgraded to 80 km/h standard. And since 2005 whole section is now back in service. Construction work remains (May 2008) particularly at the level crossings. This section is now known as the Zwönitztalbahn. Chemnitz is a centre for a train-tram experiment. Here the low floored trains run on tram lines through the city, both using the 1,435 mm (4 ft 8 1/2 in) standard gauge and adapting to the two power systems.

=== Further Usage ===
On 6 October 2007 a 2.8 kilometer stretch of the track between Schönheide Süd and Rautenkranz was brought back in service. The Westsächsische Eisenbahn (FHWE) railway preservation group has created a museum railway running the Wernesgrüner Schienen-Express.

== Description of the line ==
The Chemnitz-Aue-Adorfer railway leaves Chemnitz Hauptbahnhof with the tracks of the Dresden–Werdau line towards the west. In Chemnitzer Südbahnhof the track branches south. After a junction with the line to Stollberg, the line follows the Zwönitztal, and this section is known as the Zwönitztalbahn. At the former Zwönitz station the tracks cross the watershed of the Zwickauer Mulde. The tracks follow the Lößnitztal downwards into Aue. Aue was one of the biggest and most notable stations on the former CA line. Today the station mainly used by Erzgebirgsbahn passenger trains. There is no goods traffic. Aue is a terminus for the Zwickau–Johanngeorgenstadt line.

The next section, from Aue to Muldenberg, has been closed since 1995. After the Aue station the tracks make an arc around the town centre and lead down the Muldetal. Shortly before Bockau is one of the two tunnels on the line. The tracks have been removed and the track bed is part of a cycle way between Aue and Eibenstock. The track bed continues through Wolfsgrün station to Eibenstock. The Talsperre Eibenstock reservoir cuts the line, and floods the former Eibenstock unterer Bahnhof, which was the starting point of the steep line to the Eibenstock oberen Bahnhof. The second tunnel on the line is also beneath the reservoir. From Schönheide Ost station the track bed resumes.

In Muldenberg the tracks take Vogtlandbahn running from Falkenstein and ascend to Schöneck on the crest of the Ore Mountains. It steeply descends to Zwotental where the branch to Klingenthal and Kraslice joins. Descending further the track reaches Adorf in Elster valley where it meets the Plauen-Cheb line which was originally the Herlasgrün-Eger line of the Vogtländische Staatseisenbahn.
