= Mosel station =

Railway station in Zwickau, Germany

Mosel
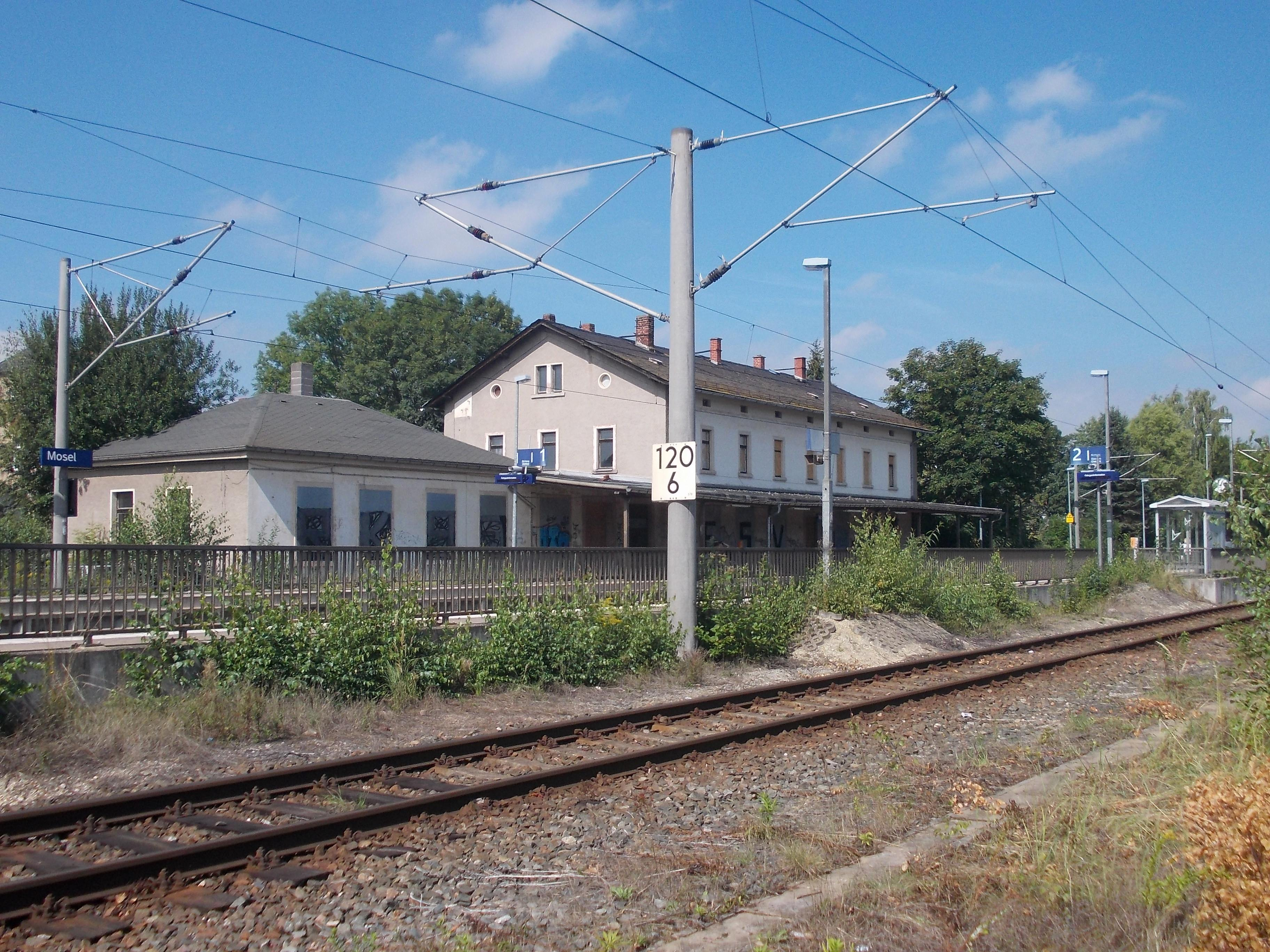
- Entrance building, track side (2015)

General information
- Location: Glauchauer Str. 18, Mosel, Zwickau, Saxony; Germany
- Coordinates: 50°47′01″N 12°28′52″E
- Lines: Dresden–Werdau railway (km 120.54); Zwickau–Crossen–Mosel (km 8.00); former Mosel–Ortmannsdorf (km 0.00)
- Platforms: 2

Construction
- Accessible: Platform 1 only

Other information
- Station code: 4185
- DS100 code: DML
- IBNR: 8012388
- Category: 6
- Website: www.bahnhof.de

History
- Opened: 15 November 1858
Location

Mosel station is a station on the Dresden–Werdau railway and the former 750 mm gauge Mosel–Ortmannsdorf railway in the village of Mosel, part of Zwickau in the German state of Saxony.

== History ==
The station was opened in 1858 with the Chemnitz–Glauchau–Zwickau section of the Dresden–Werdau railway. It was originally classified as a Haltepunkt (halt) and was reclassified as a station in 1875. With the construction of the narrow-gauge Mosel–Ortmannsdorf railway, which was opened in 1885, Mosel became an interchange station. The facilities were extensively expanded for this purpose. In addition to an enlargement of the entrance building, a roundhouse where locomotives were heated (Heizhaus), a new freight shed and other buildings were built. Since 1893, the Zwickau–Crossen–Mosel railway, a freight-only line, has entered the station.

There was a gated level crossing at the station until 1900. Then an underpass was built because of the great increase in traffic on the Dresden–Werdau railway; this still exists today.

In 1951, the narrow-gauge railway was dismantled, but the buildings of the narrow-gauge line remained for some time. The coal-loading facility, for example, was demolished only in 1982. Since 1991, the industrial railway, which now only connects to a drive shaft factory and a Volkswagen works, has been integrated into the eastern part of the station since the 1980s. The remaining part of the industrial railway was converted into a shunting track on 30 April 1999.
