= Vysoký kámen =

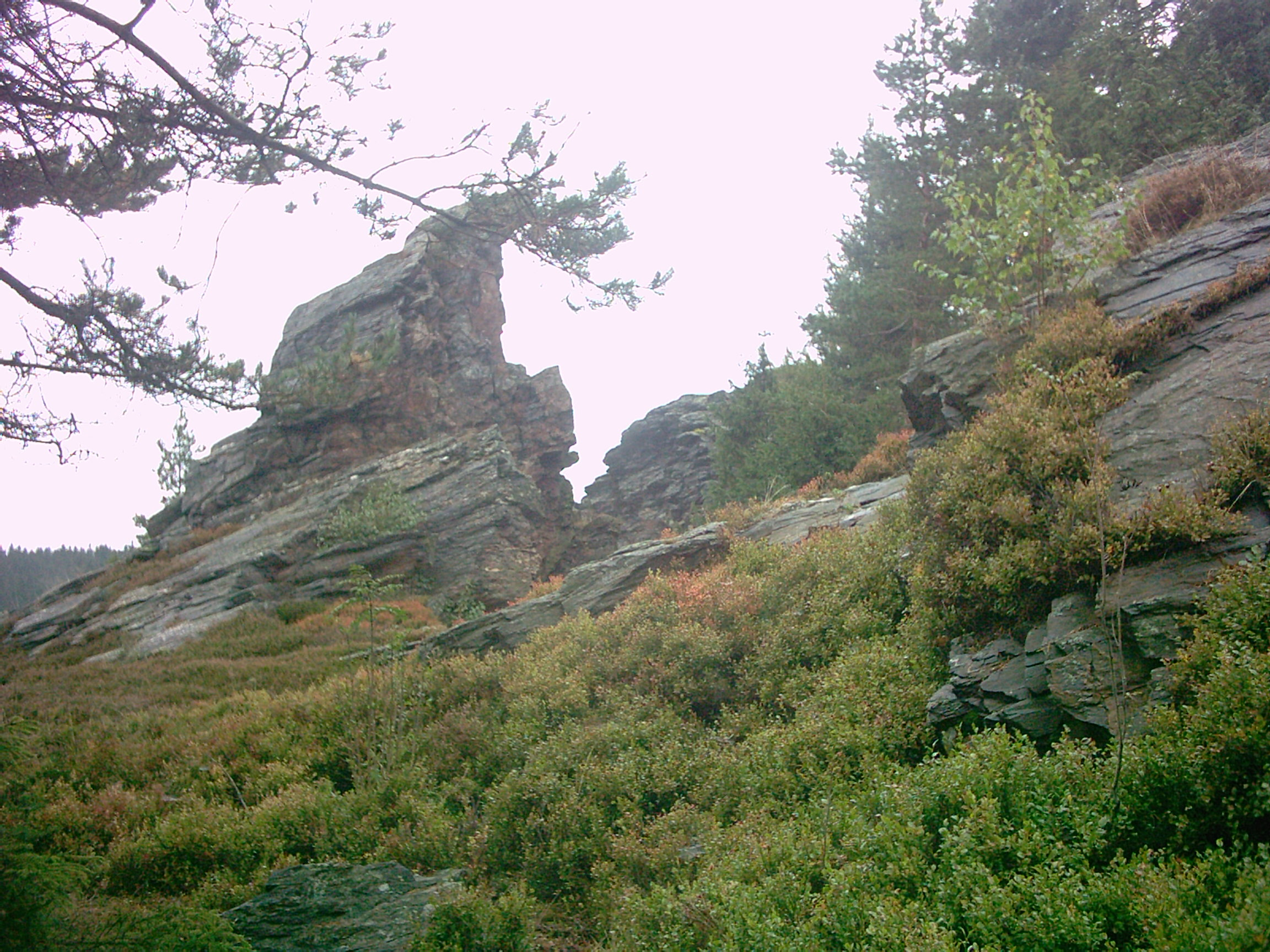

Highest point
- Elevation: 780 m (2,560 ft)
- Coordinates: 50°18′5″N 12°24′27″E

Geography
- Location: Kraslice, Czech Republic
- Parent range: Elster Mountains

Vysoký kámen is a hill and a nature monument in the territory of Kraslice in the Karlovy Vary Region of the Czech Republic. It lies in the Elster Mountains (part of the Fichtel Mountains), 1 km from the Czech–German border.

The ridge of rocks at the summit resemble a ruined castle. It is the western rocks that are used by climbers. They are ideal for beginners, with some low difficulty routes. It is also in the west that one finds the highest point, which rises to 780 m. It can be reached by means of a bridge and steel steps- forming a popular panorama point.

The ridge continues in a wall like formation, terminating at the eastern end with the Felsturm Zobák (Schnabel) and the monumental Felsen Vêtrná skála (Windfelsen). Near these precipitous formations is a Felsenmeer, a sea of free standing boulders that are in parts united with clay. The rocks are Quartz on a bed of slate. Vysoký kámen is protected as a nature monument since 1907. Even so, since then it has been threatened by quarrying four times.

At the end of World War II, countless fleeing German soldiers used Vysoký kámen as their exit route from German Sudetenland, which was reclassified as Czechoslovakia, back into Saxony. They passed through the thick forest from Eubabrunn and Erlbach over the border, avoiding the borderposts of the US Army of Occupation, and thus avoiding imprisonment.

The former restaurant Wirtshaus am Hohen Stein, a well loved daytrip destination was destroyed in 1945 but the 8 m deep well that is hidden in the woods still remains. Vysoký kámen can be reached from Eubabrunn on the Czech side.
