= Adorf (Vogtl) station =

Railway station in Saxony, Germany

Adorf (Vogtl)
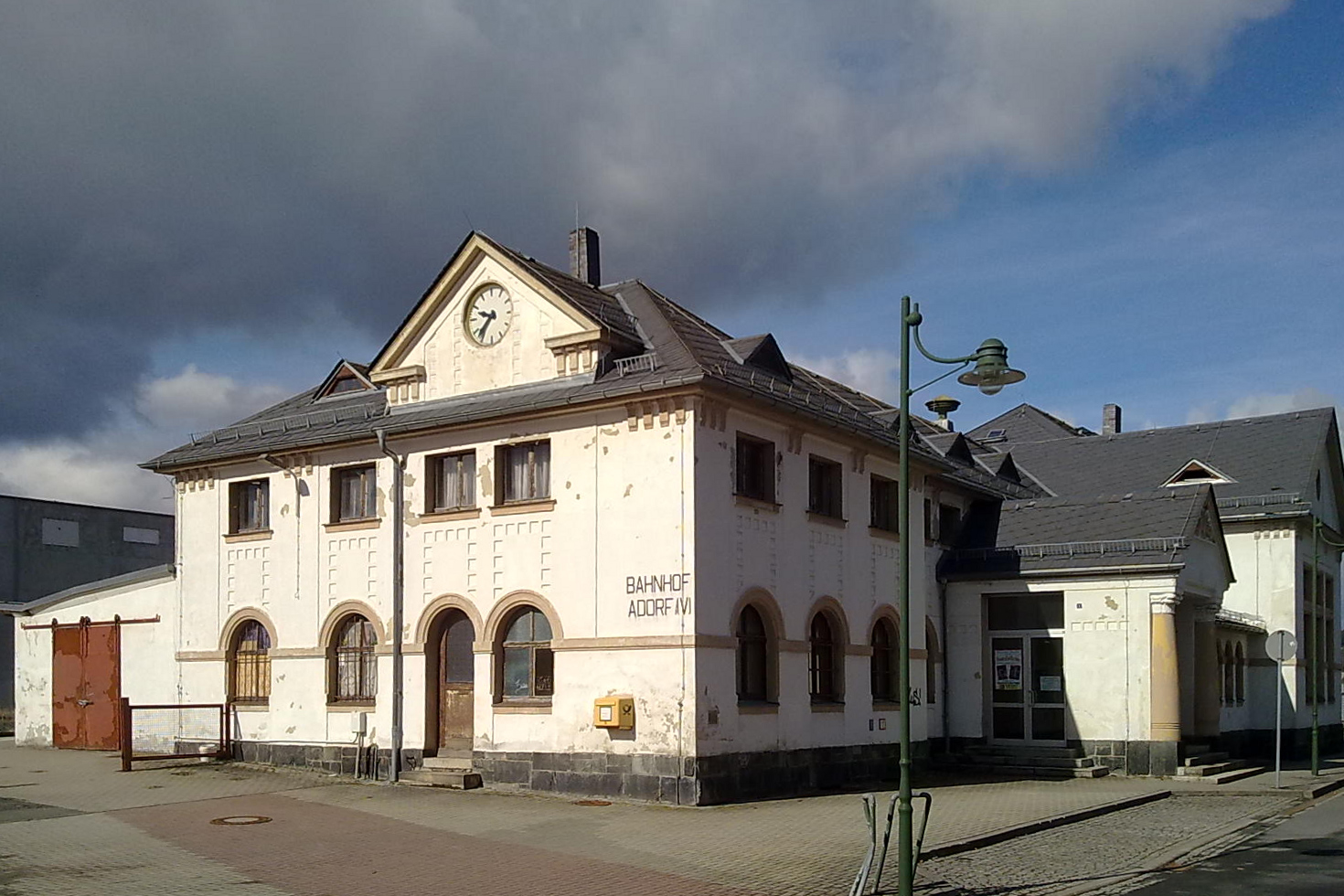
- Entrance building, street side

General information
- Location: Bahnhofstr. 5, Adorf, Saxony; Germany
- Coordinates: 50°19′28″N 12°15′38″E
- Lines: Plauen–Cheb (km 33.14); Chemnitz–Adorf (km 114.24)
- Platforms: 4

Construction
- Accessible: No

Other information
- Station code: 17
- DS100 code: DAD
- IBNR: 8010001
- Category: 5
- Website: www.bahnhof.de

History
- Opened: 1 November 1865
- Former names: Adorf; Adorf i. V.; Adorf (Vogtl)
Location

Adorf (Vogtl) station is the station of Adorf in the German state of Saxony. It is a railway junction with only local significance. Only the Plauen–Cheb railway is still operated by scheduled trains, the railway towards Chemnitz has not yet been closed, but only serves diverted trains. It no longer has scheduled passenger services. The railway towards Aš and the Siebenbrunn–Erlbach railway, trains on which used to pass through to Adorf, are now both closed.

== History ==
=== Name ===
The station had three different names in its history, as follows:

- until 30 April 1909: Adorf
- until 30. June 1911: Adorf i. V.
- since 1 July 1911: Adorf (Vogtl)

=== Operations ===
On 1 November 1865, Adorf received a railway connection with the opening of the line from Herlasgrün via Oelsnitz and Adorf to Eger (now Cheb) by the Voigtland State Railway (Voigtländische Staatseisenbahn). The newly opened through station most closely resembled Falkenstein station, but as early as 1871, Adorf station had to be extended because of the double-tracking of the Plauen–Eger line to Adorf for the first time.

The through station became a junction station with the opening of the whole Chemnitz–Adorf railway by the Chemnitz-Aue-Adorf Railway Company (Chemnitz-Aue-Adorfer Eisenbahn-Gesellschaft, CAAE) on 15 November 1875, but the line of the CAAE ended at a separate terminus, which was only connected to the state railways by way of a connection through sets of points. The tracks of the CAAE ended at a turntable in front of the entrance building. After the nationalisation of the CAAE in 1876, Adorf station was again expanded. In 1880, Adorf then received its own Heizhaus (a roundhouse where locomotives were heated).

Due to the position of the turntable at the end of the railway line from Aue, there were occasional accidents; a locomotive even ran through the gable wall of the entrance building on 6 January 1900.

Little was changed by the extension of the Asch–Roßbach railway by the Imperial Royal Austrian State Railways to Adorf in 1905. Previously, a contract had been concluded with the railway company under which the State Railways were given two former freight tracks and were allowed to use the remaining tracks of the Royal Saxon State Railways (Königlich Sächsische Staatseisenbahnen) for payment and to build a water crane and a waiting room. The extension from Roßbach was opened in 1906.

Extensive reconstruction of the station began as part of the double-tracking of the Adorf–Siebenbrunn section, since the Siebenbrunn–Markneukirchen railway was planned to run from there. For this reason, a railway construction office (Eisenbahn-Neubauamt) was established in Adorf from 1905 to 1912. Important parts of the reconstruction were:

- Raising of the southern end of the station by three and a half metres to eliminate a level crossing
- Demolition of the previous locomotive maintenance facility and construction of a new facility at Kaltenbach (line-kilometre 31.86 of the Plauen–Eger railway)
- Extension of the freight yard and the establishment of a marshalling yard
- Construction of two island platforms, making a total of six platforms
- Construction of a new entrance building
- Construction of two new signal boxes, both of which could be operated remotely.

In 1912, the station area was a 1.6 kilometres long and had 45 sets of points, eight double sets of points and a crossing loop. As early as 1909, a siding branched off from the station; this operated until 1967.

The station survived the Second World War largely undamaged, only suffering from low-flying strafing, which caused little damage. After the war, the second track of the railway was dismantled for reparations and many rail connections within the station became superfluous and were dismantled. The traffic to Roßbach, which was interrupted at the end of the Second World War, was not resumed, and the route to Roßbach between 1946 and 1951 was also dismantled. The second track of the Plauen–Cheb line was not rebuilt until 1979.

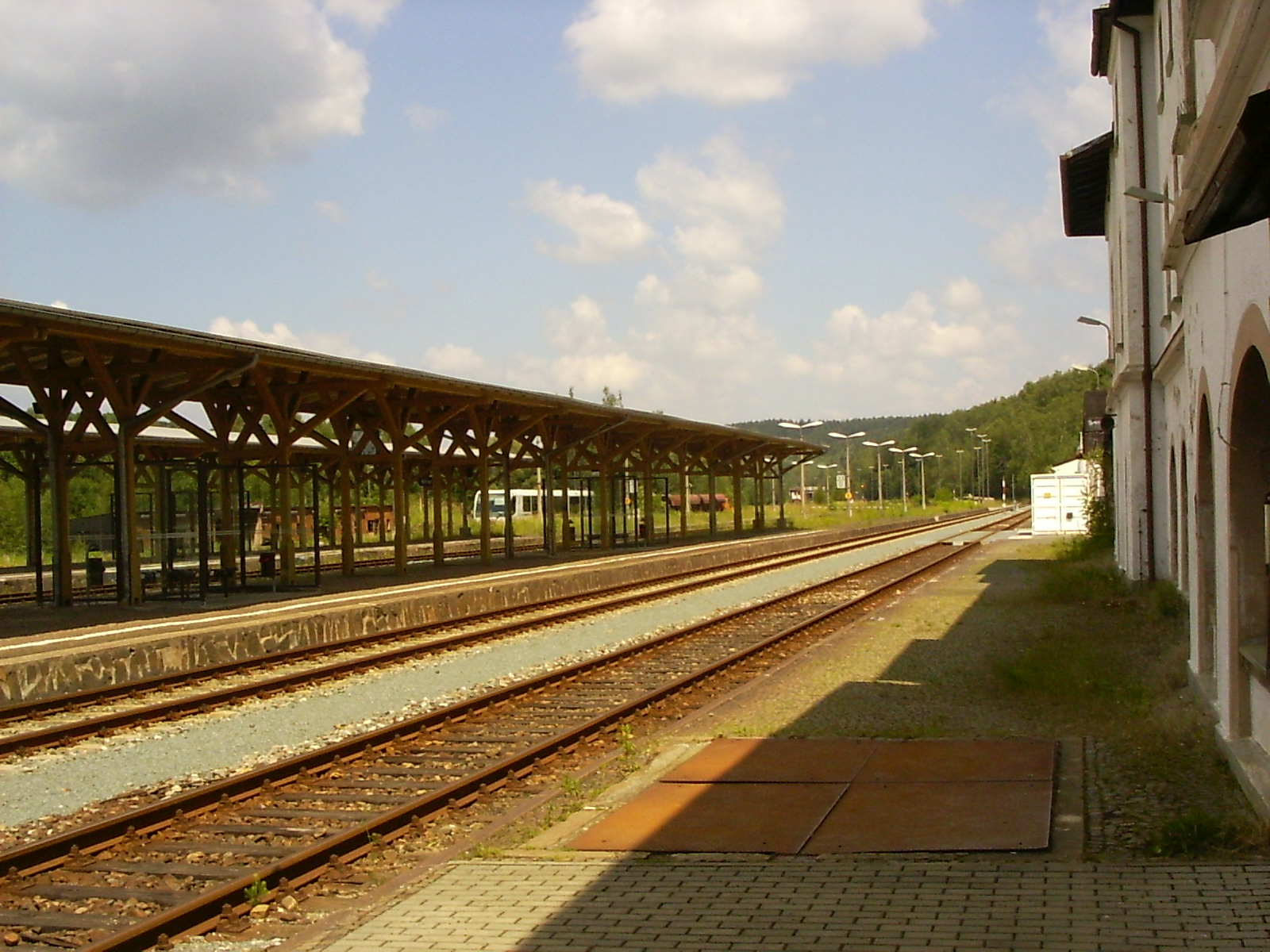
Island platform (looking towards Plauen)

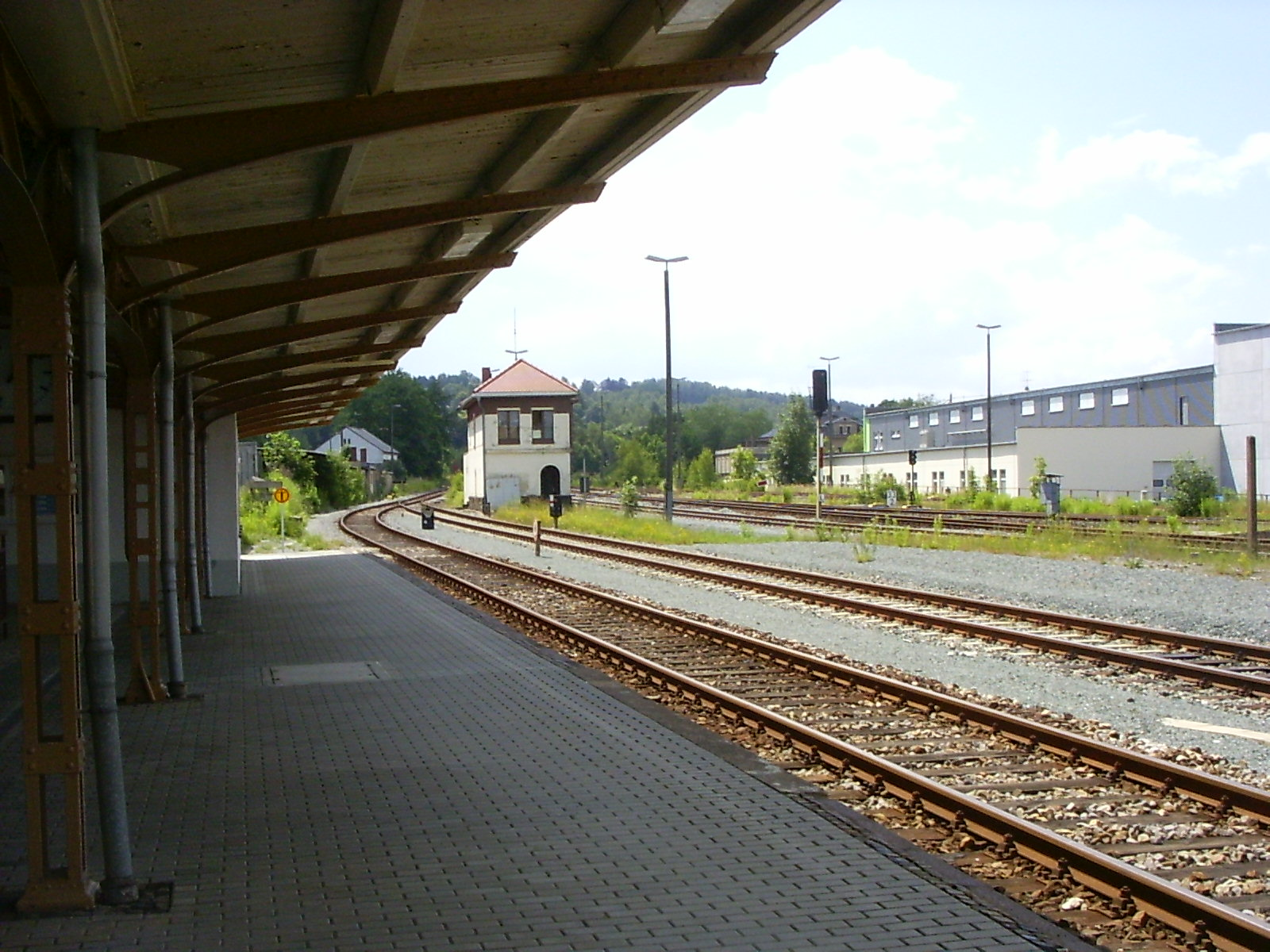
Signal box in Adorf station

In 1990, the station consisted of 54 sets of points, two simple crossovers and a crossing loop.

The entrance building, which had been abandoned during the last two decades, was demolished in November 2012.

=== Adorf locomotive depot ===
The Adorf locomotive depot (Bahnbetriebswerk Adorf) developed from the Adorf locomotive yard (Lokstation Adorf), after the construction of a six-storey Heizhaus from 1877 to 1880. Previously, the Haltestelle Adorf (Adorf halt) of the CAAE had a two-stall Heizhaus.

After the nationalisation of the CAAE, there were plans for the construction of a Heizhaus at Adorf station, but these were rejected for cost reasons. Four years later a Heizhaus was erected in the immediate vicinity of the entrance building. Because of the cramped conditions, it had to be long and narrow, with space for only a total of six locomotives on its two tracks; a water crane, a workshop and a coal shed were also built. Since the facilities were close to the town, there were numerous complaints from the population about the smoke pollution.

Since the facilities could not be extended due to lack of space, during the rebuilding of the station between 1905 and 1912, new facilities were built from March 1906 outside the station area on the Kaltenbach near line-kilometre 31.86 of the Plauen–Eger railway (located towards Plauen/Roßbach from Adorf station). The works, which were finished in June 1909, included a fifteen-stall half roundhouse with a 20-m turntable and an administrative building.

From 1928 to 1933 the depot facilities were again enlarged. Two new sheds were built, the workshop was expanded and maintenance facilities—the construction of an axle lowering facility, improvement of the sanitary facilities, construction of a coal crane—were built for the staff.

The locomotive depot was dissolved in 1948/49 because of a plan to extend the scheduled route for the daily circulation of locomotives, but the plan was not realised. Adorf station was abolished on 30 June 1969 as an independent depot and subordinated to Reichenbach locomotive depot as a motive-power depot.

The locomotive depot was converted on 30 November 1992 into a depot for passenger vehicles only, but it was finally closed in 1997. Currently, the Vogtländische Eisenbahnverein Adorf uses the facilities and some museum vehicles (including 86 607 and an ELNA 1) are based there.

==== Locomotive use ====
At first locomotives of classes H VII, H IIIb T, H V T and IV T were stationed in Adorf. Before the First World War, classes V V, I V, XI HV, XI H, XI HV, XII H2 (later class 38.2–3) and XI HT (class 94.19–21) were added to these. After the First World War, class XIII H (class 58.4) locomotives were used for freight operations.

Locomotives of the Royal Saxon State Railways were used almost exclusively until the end of the 1920s, but afterwards other locomotives were operated occasionally. However, the Saxon State Railways locomotives remained in use at least until 1965. Class 75.5 locomotives were used at Adolf only for a short time; as a substitute for one received at the end of the 1920s, it received several brand new class 86 locomotives. The class 38.2–3 was supplemented by class 38.10–40 locomotives, which could be used in the same way. Numerous locomotives of class 58.10–21 with the same design as class 58.4 were introduced in the Vogtland.

Some class 50 locomotives were stationed in Adorf in the Second World War, but before the end of the war they had been replaced by class 52. Classes 38.2–3, 52, 58, 75.5, 86 and 94.19–21 locomotives were available in the locomotive depot at the end of the war. In addition, there were individual locomotives of classes 53, 54.15–17, 91 and 56.34–35, but they were retired soon after the end of the war or handed over to other departments. The tender locomotives were also retired and were replaced by more tender locomotives of classes 75.5 and 86.

With the advent of uranium mining, Adorf once again received class 58.4 locomotives, which from then on also hauled express trains—including the Karlex—as well as heavy freight trains. In addition, class 50 locomotives were introduced in the mid-1950s.

The first time diesel locomotives, belonging to class V 200, were stationed in Adorf in 1968 and the change of traction to diesel was completed in 1971. After that only diesel vehicles were used until the closure of the locomotive depot.

In addition to class V 60 locomotives, class V 180 and 130/131/132 locomotives were also based in Adorf.

== Sources ==
- Rettig, Wilfried (2001). Die Eisenbahnen im Vogtland [The Railways in Vogtland] (in German). Vol. 1: Entwicklung, Hauptstrecken, Fahrzeuge, Bahnbetriebswerke und Hochbauten. Freiburg: EK-Verlag. ISBN 3-88255-686-2.
- Rettig, Wilfried (2007). Plauen/V–Cheb (Eger) – Die Bahnlinie PE in der Euregio-Egrensis (in German). Fraureuth: Verlag Jacobi. ISBN 978-3-937228-01-3.
- Kühne, Klaus-Jürgen (2011). Bahnbetriebswerke der DDR — 1949–1993 (in German). Stuttgart: transpress-Verlag. ISBN 978-3-613-71401-4.
