= Elster Mountains =

Mountain range in Germany and the Czech Republic

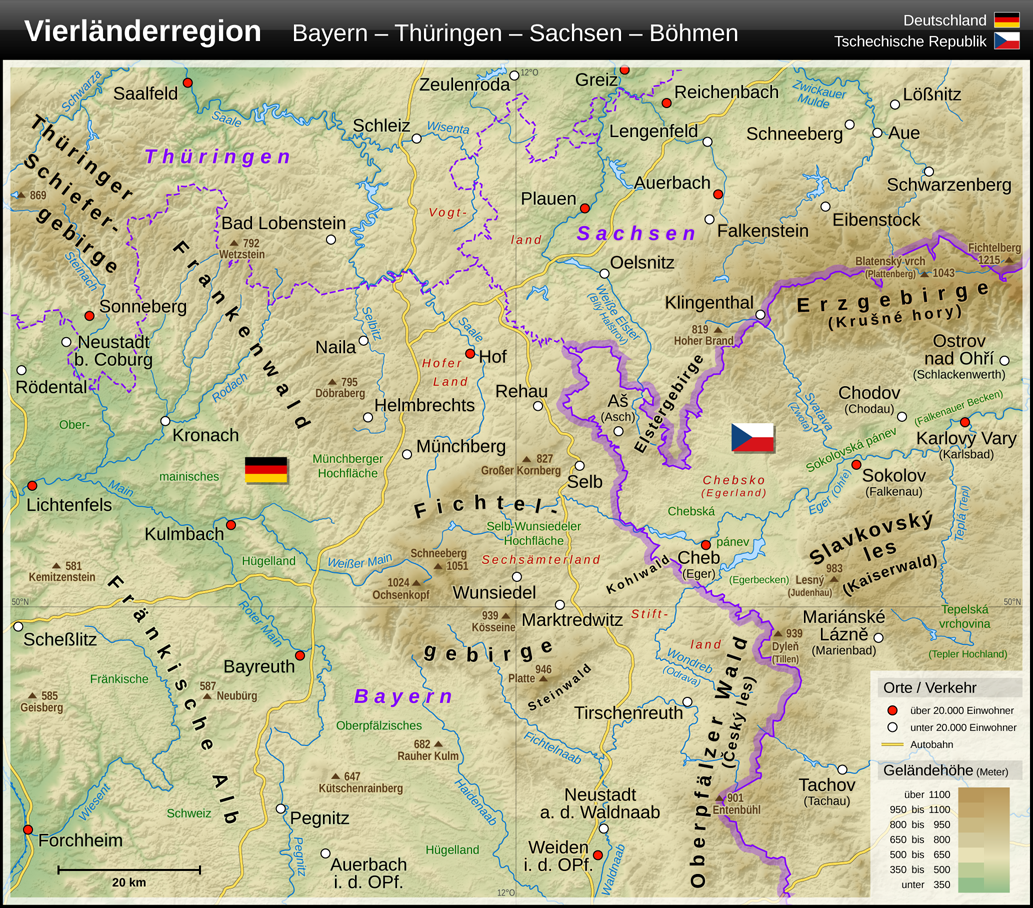
- The Elster Mountains on the German-Czech border

Highest point
- Peak: Hoher Brand
- Elevation: 805 m (2,641 ft)

Geography
- State(s): Germany (Saxony), Czech Republic
- Range coordinates: 50°11′18″N 12°18′01″E
- Parent range: Fichtel Mountains

The Elster Mountains (German: Elstergebirge, Czech: Halštrovské hory) is a small mountain range within the Fichtel Mountains in Germany and the Czech Republic. They lie in a region known as Vogtland, and take their name from the river Elster, or more precisely the White Elster which has its source in these hills, near the Czech town of Aš.

The valley of the Svatava marks the northeastern border between the Elster Mountains and the Ore Mountains. The highest points Hoher Brand with an elevation of 805 m, Vysoký kámen at 773 m, Háj u Aše at 758 m and the Kapellenberg at 757 m. The Elster Mountains have many mineral-rich springs on which the spa towns of Bad Brambach and Bad Elster in Vogtlandkreis were founded; and the Czech spa of Františkovy Lázně was founded.

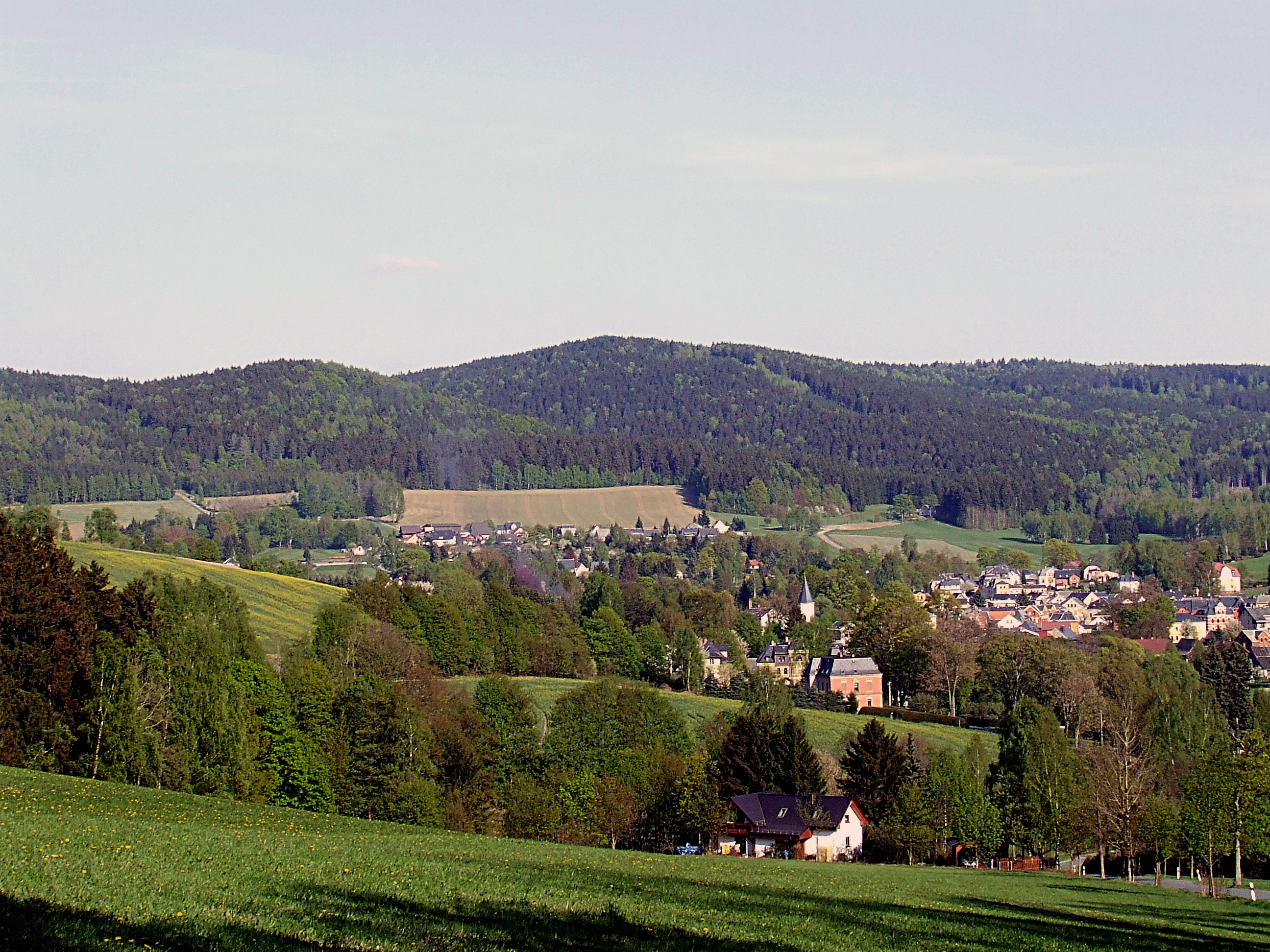
Cone-shaped hills near Erlbach

== See also ==
- List of regions of Saxony
