= Reichenbach (Vogtland) Oberer Bahnhof =

Railway station in Reichenbach im Vogtland, Germany

Reichenbach (Vogtland) Ob Bf
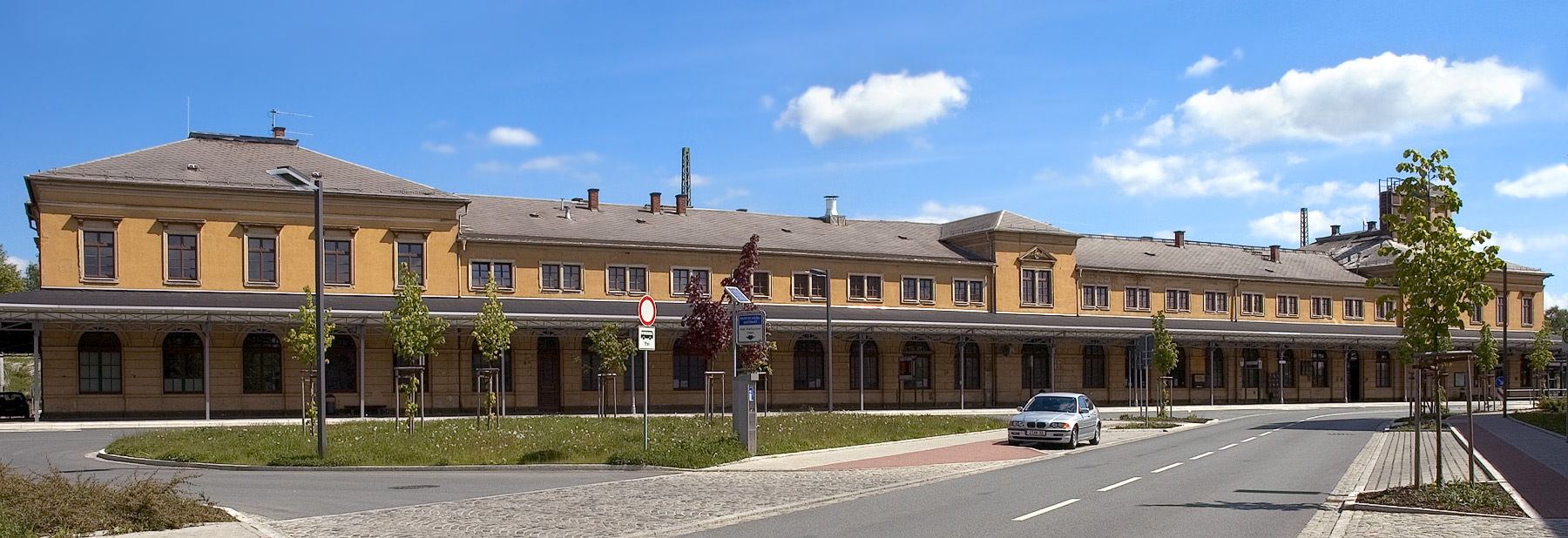
- Regional public transport interchange at station, street side

General information
- Location: Bahnhofstr. 10, Reichenbach im Vogtland, Saxony; Germany
- Coordinates: 50°37′40″N 12°17′31″E
- Owner: Deutsche Bahn
- Operator: DB Station&Service
- Lines: Leipzig – Hof (km 90.961); former Reichenbach (Vogtl) ob Bf – Göltzsch Viaduct (km 0)
- Platforms: 5

Construction
- Accessible: Yes

Other information
- Station code: 5187
- DS100 code: DRC
- IBNR: 8012739
- Category: 4
- Website: www.bahnhof.de

History
- Opened: 31 May 1846

Services
| Preceding station | Mitteldeutsche Regiobahn | Following station |
|---|---|---|
| Plauen (Vogtl) ob Bf towards Hof Hbf | RE 3 | Zwickau Hbf towards Dresden Hbf |
| Preceding station | Vogtlandbahn | Following station |
| Netzschkau towards Adorf (Vogtl) or Cheb | RB 2 | Neumark (Sachs) towards Zwickau Zentrum |
Location
- Location within Saxony Location within Germany Location within Europe

Reichenbach (Vogtland) Oberer Bahnhof (Upper station) is the main railway station of Reichenbach im Vogtland in the German state of Saxony. It is the only remaining station in Reichenbach, which once had three stations, and is located on the Saxon-Franconian trunk line between Nuremberg and Dresden. It is also the last major station before the junction with the main line to Leipzig from the direction of Nuremberg and Plauen. Together with Plauen station, it used to be one of two DB Fernverkehr stations in Vogtland.

Regional services stopping at the station are operated by DB Regio Regional-Express services and Vogtlandbahn. Regional and city buses also stop at the station. The station is located in the transport district of the Verkehrsverbund Vogtland ("Vogtland transport association", VVV).

== History ==
The first station in Reichenbach was built in 1845. The former station building is situated on a disused railway line about 300 metres to the west of the current station (halfway to the now abandoned train depot). The current station was built in about 1848 when the Saxon-Bavarian Railway Company extended its line from Leipzig, which had previously terminated in Reichenbach, to Plauen and Hof, following the completion of the Göltzsch Viaduct (the largest brick bridge in the world) and the Elster Viaduct.

Originally the current Reichenbach station was identical with the "Upper station" in Plauen, which was destroyed in the Second World War and then rebuilt to a different plan. Both stations were “island stations” (Inselbahnhöfe), with the main station building built between the tracks, with three tracks on each side of the island. The island platforms (tracks 1/2 and 5/6) were accessed by subways from the main building, along with tracks 3 and 4. A third pedestrian underpass linked the street of Am Bahnhof ("at station") and Fedor-Flinzer-Straße (street), running under railway tracks 1–3 to the large waiting hall in the main station building. For vehicles and pedestrians from the city centre there was a large tunnel (also running under tracks 1 to 3) carrying Bahnhofstraße ("station street") to Bahnhofsvorplatz ("station square"), which was between the tracks.

=== Branch lines ===
In 1895, a secondary line was opened from Reichenbach to Göltzsch Viaduct and a connecting line was opened to Lengenfeld in 1905. This line started at an additional platform at Reichenbach station (track 7), located at the end of platform track 4. The new line had two other stations in Reichenbach: Oberreichenbach ("upper Reichenbach")—later Reichenbach Ost (east)—and Reichenbach (Vogtland) Unterer Bahnhof ("Lower station"), which connected with passenger services on the narrow gauge Rollbock Railway to Upper Heindorf from 1902 to 1957. At the same time as the lower station was opened, the name of the main Reichenbach station was changed to Reichenbach (Vogtland) Oberer Bahnhof.

=== Demolition and reconstruction (since 1963) ===
Since the closure in 1957 of the branch lines starting in Reichenbach, the upper station has been the only station left in Reichenbach for passenger traffic, but it has not been renamed. With the end of branch lines, track 7 (the platform for the secondary line) was demolished, leaving only the original six tracks. From 1963 to 2001 the station hardly changed.

In 2001, the station (but not the station building) was completely rebuilt. First a new island platform (platform tracks 7 and 8) was built in the same style as the original platforms next to platform 6. The existing underpass to platform 5/6 was extended to the new platform. The platforms of tracks 4 to 6 were completely renovated and provided with new information displays, seating and lifts. In addition, two new sidings and bypass for freight traffic were built. Then tracks 1 and 2 and the associated underpasses and pedestrian and road tunnels were demolished. On the cleared space a link was built in 2006 between Fedor-Flinzer Straße and Bahnhofstraße, including a roundabout and the station forecourt was provided with parking and redesigned taxi stands. A new bus station was built next to the station. The remaining platform tracks were renumbered 1 to 5.

== Regional transport ==
The following services called at the station in 2022:

| Line | Route | Frequency (min) |
|---|---|---|
| RE 3 | Dresden – Freiberg (Sachs) – Chemnitz – Glauchau (Sachs) – Zwickau (Sachs) – Reichenbach (Vogtl) – Hof (Saale) | 60 |
| RB 2 | Zwickau Stadthalle – Zwickau (Sachs) – Werdau – Reichenbach (Vogtl) – Plauen (Vogtl) – Adorf (Vogtl) – Bad Brambach (– Cheb) | 60 (Zwickau–Adorf); 120 (Adorf–Bad Brambach) |
