= Kapellenberg (Vogtland) =

Mountain in Germany

Coordinates: 50°11′18″N 12°18′01″E

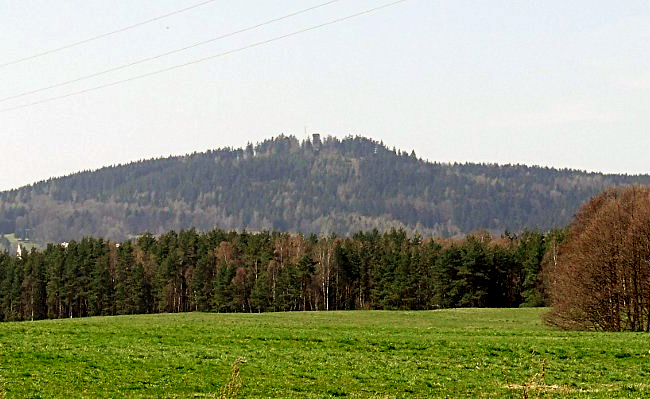
- Kapellenberg near Schönberg

Highest point
- Elevation: 759 m (2,490 ft)

Geography
- Location: Saxony, Germany

The Kapellenberg is a mountain of Saxony, southeastern Germany. It is the highest peak of the german part of the Elster Mountains. It is located in the south Saxon Vogtlandkreis, near Schönberg, in close proximity to the Czech border.
