= Vojtanov =

- Municipality
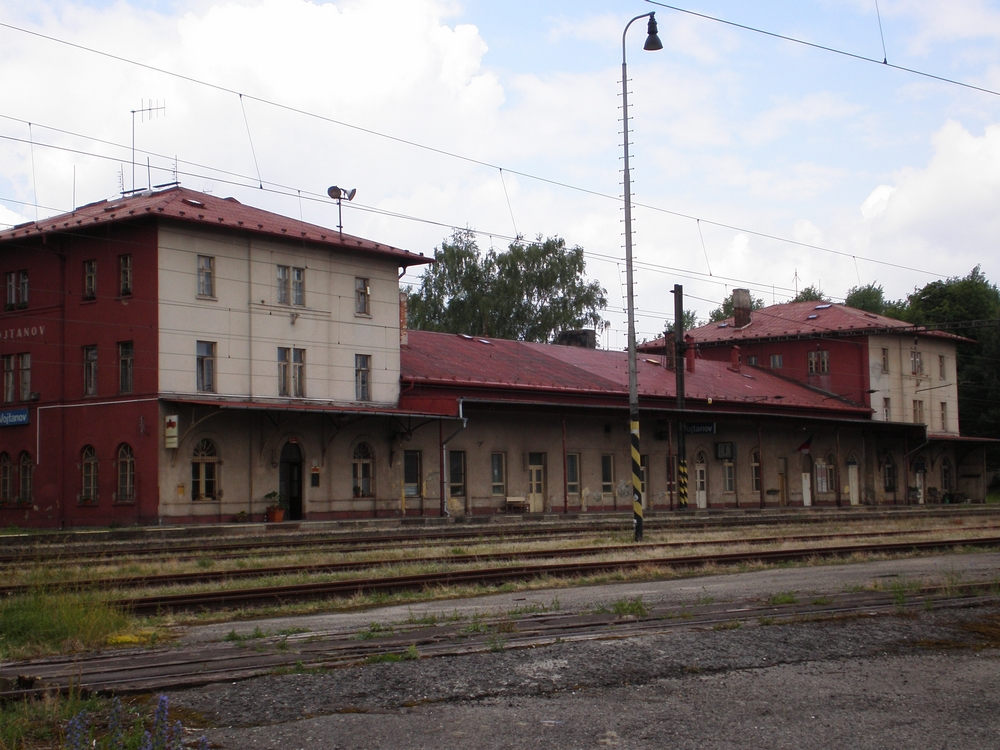
- Train station

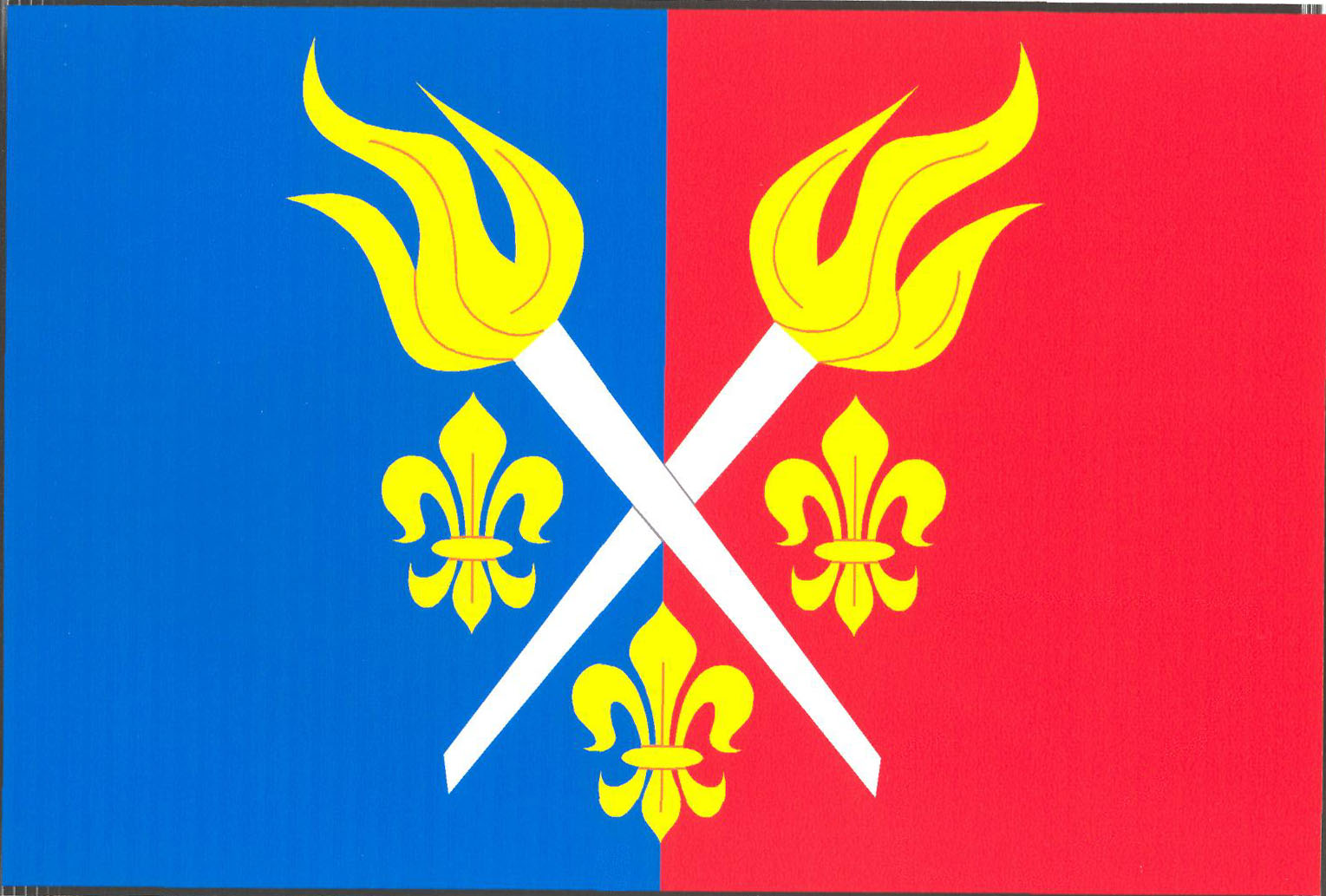
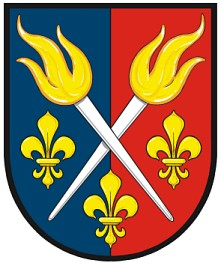
- Flag Coat of arms

- Location in the Czech Republic
- Coordinates: 50°10′6″N 12°19′3″E
- Country: Czech Republic
- Region: Karlovy Vary
- District: Cheb
- First mentioned: 1299

Area
  - Total: 10.19 km^{2} (3.93 sq mi)
- Elevation: 518 m (1,699 ft)

Population (2026-01-01)
  - Total: 248
  - Density: 24.3/km^{2} (63.0/sq mi)
- Time zone: UTC+1 (CET)
  - Summer (DST): UTC+2 (CEST)
- Postal codes: 350 02, 351 34
- Website: www.vojtanov.cz

Vojtanov (German: Voitersreuth) is a municipality and village in Cheb District in the Karlovy Vary Region of the Czech Republic. It has about 200 inhabitants.

== Administrative division ==
Vojtanov consists of four municipal parts (in brackets population according to the 2021 census):

- Vojtanov (192)
- Antonínova Výšina (6)
- Mýtinka (14)
- Zelený Háj (9)

== Demographics ==
Historical population
Year	Pop.	±%
1869	684	—
1880	820	+19.9%
1890	701	−14.5%
1900	647	−7.7%
1910	770	+19.0%
1921	757	−1.7%
1930	745	−1.6%
1950	266	−64.3%
1961	329	+23.7%
1970	282	−14.3%
1980	235	−16.7%
1991	170	−27.7%
2001	192	+12.9%
2011	203	+5.7%
2021	221	+8.9%
Source: Censuses
