= Plauen (Vogtland) Oberer Bahnhof =

Railway station in Plauen, Germany

Plauen (Vogtl) ob Bf
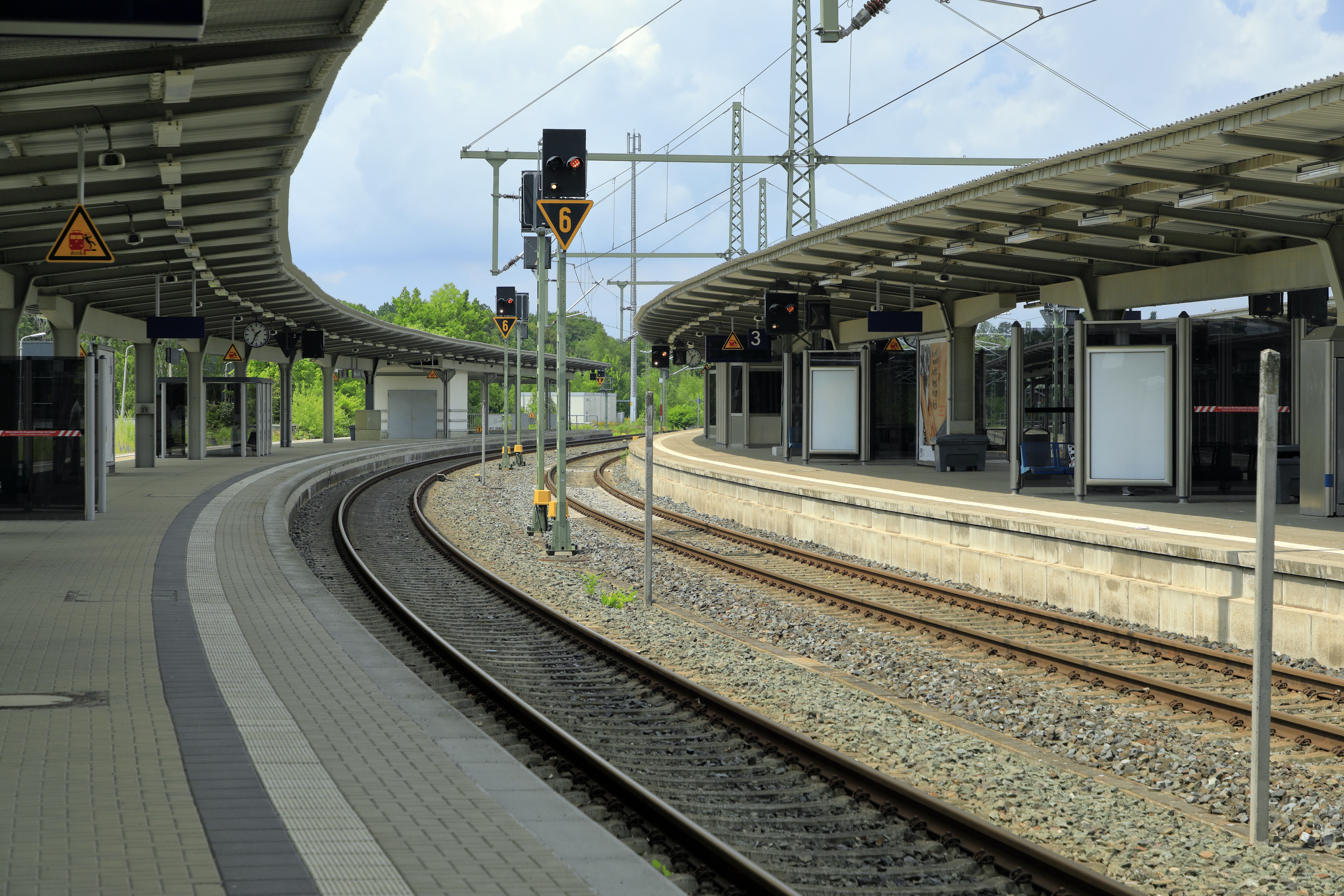
- 2023

General information
- Location: Rathenauplatz 2, 08525 Plauen; Plauen, Saxony; Germany
- Coordinates: 50°30′19″N 12°07′48″E
- Owner: Deutsche Bahn
- Operator: DB Station&Service
- Lines: Leipzig–Hof railway; Plauen–Cheb railway
- Platforms: 3
- Tracks: 6

Construction
- Accessible: Yes
- Architectural style: Functionalism

Other information
- Station code: 4955
- DS100 code: DP
- IBNR: 8010275
- Category: 3
- Website: www.bahnhof.de

History
- Opened: 1848

Passengers
- 1,400 per day

Services
| Preceding station | Mitteldeutsche Regiobahn | Following station |
|---|---|---|
| Hof Hbf Terminus | RE 3 | Reichenbach (Vogtl) ob Bf towards Dresden Hbf |
| Preceding station | Vogtlandbahn | Following station |
| Plauen (Vogtl) West towards Adorf (Vogtl) or Cheb | RB 2 | Jößnitz towards Zwickau Zentrum |
| Syrau towards Hof Hbf | RB 2 | Jößnitz towards Zwickau Zentrum |
| Syrau towards Mehltheuer | RB 5 | Jößnitz towards Karlovy Vary |
Location

Plauen (Vogtland) Oberer Bahnhof (Upper station) is the main station of Plauen in the German state of Saxony on the Leipzig–Hof line. It is the main hub of rail traffic in Vogtland. This station is maintained and operated by DB Station&Service.

== History ==
Plauen station was opened in 1848. For three years from that time it was a terminus with a stagecoach connection to Plauen city and to Reichenbach station. In 1851 the continuous Leipzig–Reichenbach–Plauen–Hof line was completed. In 1874, the Oelsnitz–Cheb line was extended to Plauen. The following year the station was renamed as Plauen (Vogtland) Oberer Bahnhof, following the opening of the Elster Valley Railway with its own station, Plauen (Vogtland) Unterer Bahnhof (lower station).

In the Second World War, the historic station building was completely destroyed by bombing. In late 2006, the station’s mechanical interlocking was closed and the train dispatcher was removed, when the station track was integrated into the Leipzig electronic interlocking.

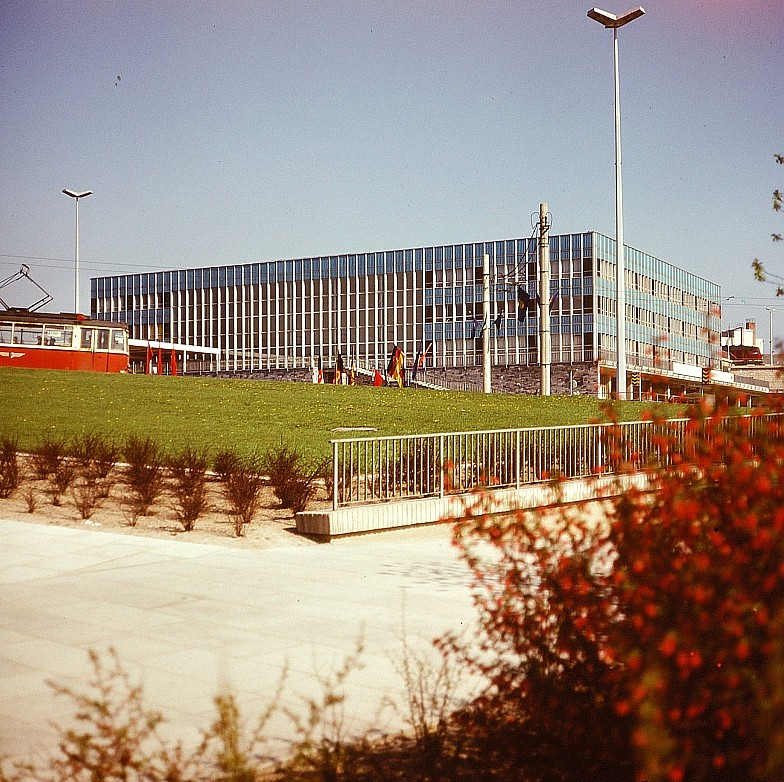
Station building in 1975

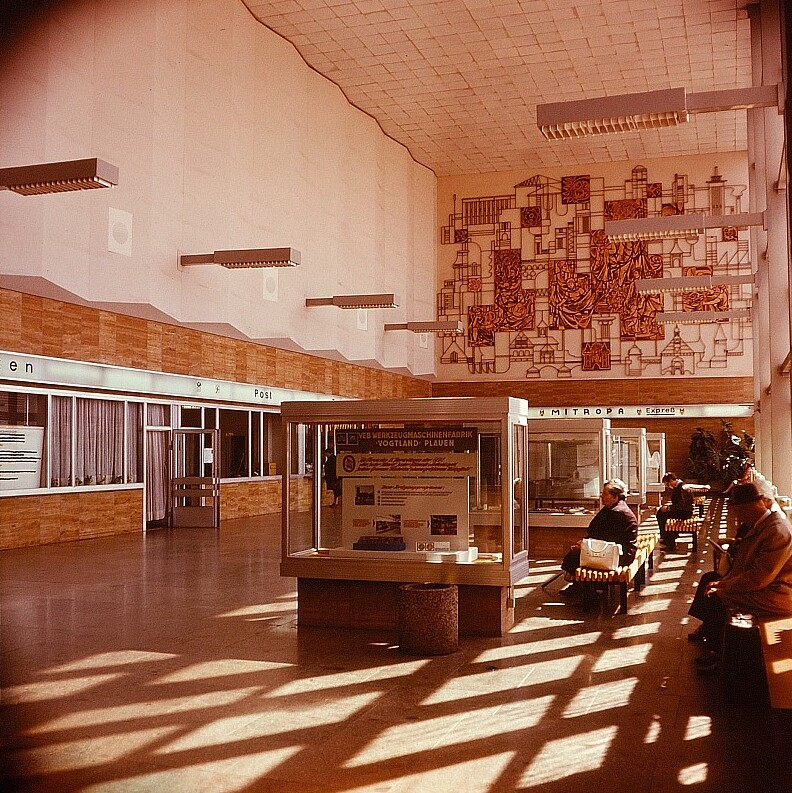
Entrance hall in 1975

== Operations ==
The station has six platforms and a goods yard, as well as a loading facility for timber.

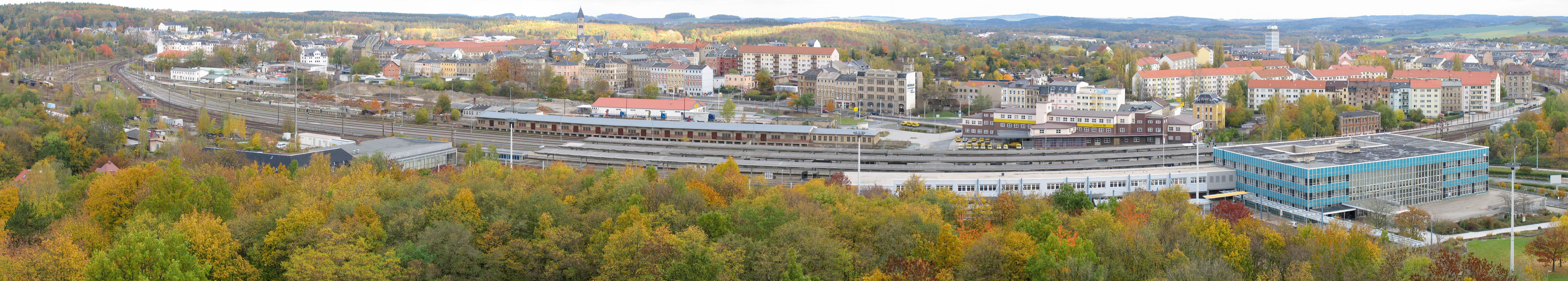
The upper station seen from Bärensteinturm

== Connections ==
=== Railway services ===
With Regional-Express services, there are daily direct connections to several major cities. Vogtlandbahn directly connects Plauen with almost all stations of the Vogtland district and other cities in Bavaria, Thuringia and Bohemian Vogtland. From June 2005 Vogtlandbahn operated the Vogtland-Express, the only direct service to Berlin, although as a rail service are now been suspended. Due to its function as a transport hub, the station is operated by Deutsche Bahn, which classifies it as a category 3 station.

=== Local transport ===
The station is connected by buses and lines 1, 5 and 6 of Plauen tramways, which pass in front of the station. In addition, there is a taxi stand in front of the main station entrance.

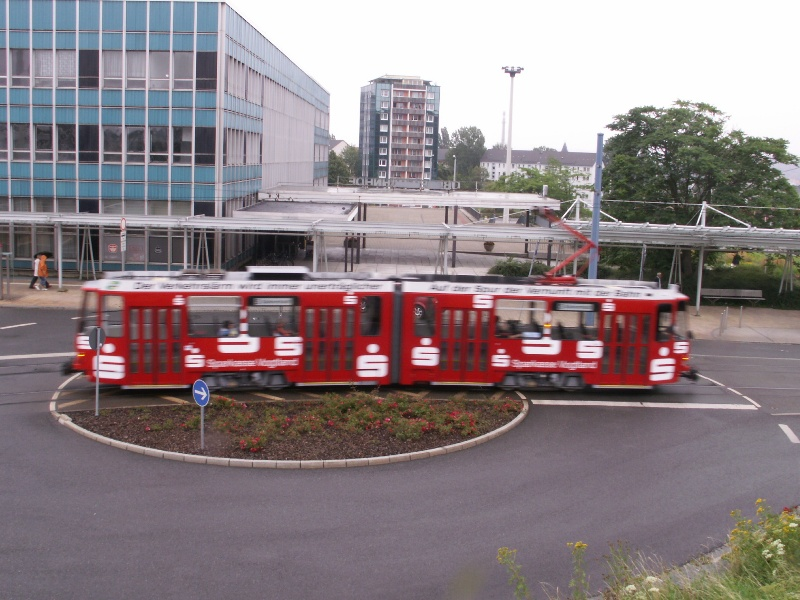
Plauen tramways stop in front of the station building
