= Erlbach, Saxony =

Erlbach
- Ortsteil of Markneukirchen
- Coat of arms
- Interactive map of Erlbach
- Location within Germany Location within Saxony
- Coordinates: 50°18′50″N 12°22′3″E
- Country: Germany
- State: Saxony
- District: Vogtlandkreis
- Town: Markneukirchen

Area
  - Total: 21.72 km^{2} (8.39 sq mi)
- Elevation: 515–560 m (1,690–1,837 ft)

Population (2013)
  - Total: 1,680
  - Density: 77.3/km^{2} (200/sq mi)
- Time zone: UTC+01:00 (CET)
  - Summer (DST): UTC+02:00 (CEST)
- Postal codes: 08258
- Dialling codes: 037422
- Vehicle registration: V, OVL
- Website: www.erlbach-vogtland.de

Erlbach is a village and a former municipality in the Vogtlandkreis district, in Saxony, Germany. Since 1 January 2014, it is part of the town Markneukirchen.

The village was considered a Luftkurort until 2022, which is a certification for resort locations in Germany.
