= Zwickau Hauptbahnhof =

Railway station in Zwickau, Germany

Zwickau (Sachs) Hbf
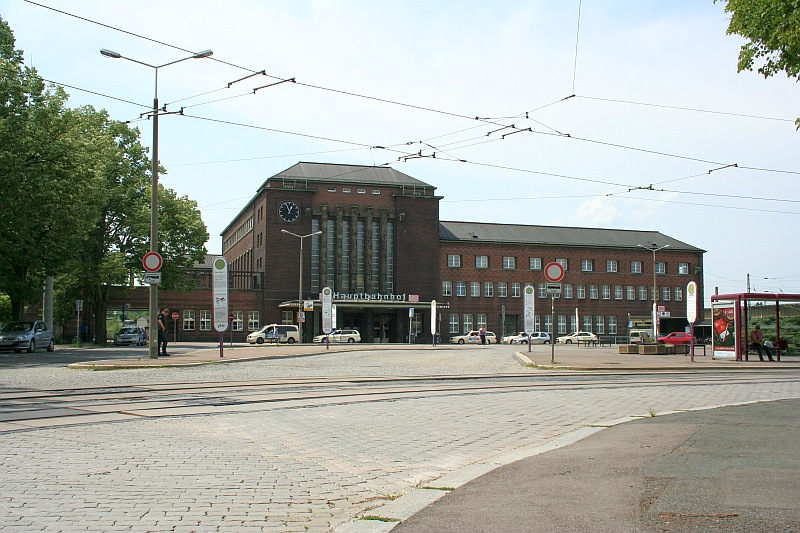
- The station building

General information
- Location: Am Bahnhof 1, Zwickau, Saxony; Germany
- Coordinates: 50°42′54″N 12°28′37″E
- Lines: Dresden–Werdau (128.35 km); Zwickau–Falkenstein (-2.110 km); Schwarzenberg–Zwickau (37.97 km)
- Platforms: 8

Construction
- Accessible: Yes
- Architect: Otto Falk (1933)

Other information
- Station code: 7068
- DS100 code: DZW
- IBNR: 8010397
- Category: 3
- Fare zone: VMS: 16
- Website: www.bahnhof.de

History
- Opened: 18 September 1845
Location
- Location within Saxony Location within Germany Location within Europe

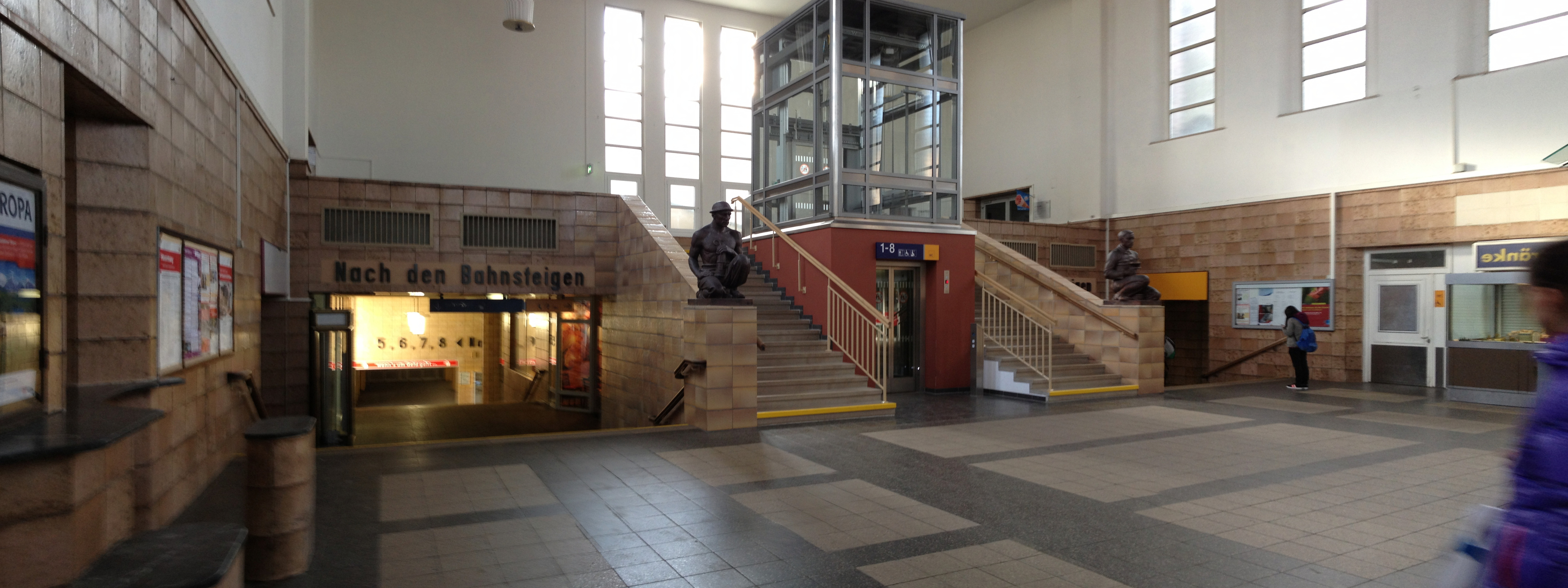
Entrance hall with communist-era statues (2014).

Zwickau Hauptbahnhof is the main railway station of Zwickau in the German state of Saxony.

== History ==
On 18 September 1845 Zwickau was connected by a branch line to the Leipzig–Reichenbach railway line. This was followed on 11 May 1858 by the line to Schwarzenberg, on 15 November 1858 by the line to Chemnitz and on 29 November 1875 by the line to Falkenstein.

The first station building was a wooden structure built in 1845. This soon no longer met increasing requirements and had to be replaced by a new building, which was completed in 1858.

The current station building was designed by Deutsche Reichsbahn architect Otto Falk, built from 1933 to 1936 and opened on 17 December 1936.

== Location ==
The station is separated from the inner city and the Neumarkt interchange. After lines 7 of the Zwickau tramway network and bus lines 16 and 19 of the Zwickau Municipal Transport Authority (Städtische Verkehrsbetriebe Zwickau) were closed, bus line 10 is main bus line connecting the station with the city centre. In the near future Zwickau Municipal Transport Authority plans to reopen the tram to connect the station, by using new tracks and rebuilding station square. In addition, many regional bus services begin at the station, which are mainly operated by the West Saxony Regional Transport Authority (Regionalverkehrsbetriebe Westsachsen).

== Zwickau model ==
A special feature is the Zwickau model of tram-train operations. BOStrab-compliant RegioSprinters of the Vogtlandbahn run over tram tracks to the Zwickau central (Zentrum) tram stop. Tram-trains run from the Zwickau–Schwarzenberg line at street level to the Stadthalle tram stop. The metre-gauge line has a third rail fitted to allow standard gauge vehicles to continue to the Zentrum tram stop. The RegioSprinters are diesel-powered as most of the Vogtlandbahn network is not electrified and the vehicles are slightly narrower than normal because the tram line does not have sufficient clearance for full-width standard gauge vehicles.

== Rail services ==
The following services operate through Zwickau:

Preceding station	Mitteldeutsche Regiobahn	Following station
Reichenbach (Vogtl) ob Bf towards Hof Hbf	RE 3	Glauchau (Sachs) towards Dresden Hbf
Terminus	RB 30	Zwickau-Pölbitz towards Dresden Hbf
Preceding station	Vogtlandbahn	Following station
Zwickau Stadthalle towards Zwickau Zentrum	RB 1	Stenn towards Kraslice
Lichtentanne towards Adorf (Vogtl) or Cheb	RB 2	Zwickau Stadthalle towards Zwickau Zentrum
Preceding station	Erzgebirgsbahn	Following station
Terminus	RB 95	Zwickau-Schedewitz towards Georgenstadt
Preceding station	Mitteldeutschland S-Bahn	Following station
Lichtentanne towards Halle (Saale) Hbf	S 5	Terminus
Werdau towards Halle (Saale) Hbf	S 5x	Terminus

== See also ==
- Rail transport in Germany
- Railway stations in Germany
