= Pöhl =

- Municipality
- Location of Pöhl within Vogtlandkreis district
- Interactive map of Pöhl
- Location within Germany Location within Saxony
- Coordinates: 50°34′N 12°9′E
- Country: Germany
- State: Saxony
- District: Vogtlandkreis
- Subdivisions: 5

Government
  - Mayor (2020–27): Erik Jung

Area
  - Total: 36.64 km^{2} (14.15 sq mi)
- Elevation: 427 m (1,401 ft)

Population (2025-12-31)
  - Total: 2,320
  - Density: 63.3/km^{2} (164/sq mi)
- Time zone: UTC+01:00 (CET)
  - Summer (DST): UTC+02:00 (CEST)
- Dialling codes: 037439
- Vehicle registration: V, AE, OVL, PL, RC
- Website: www.poehl.de

Pöhl (German pronunciation: [pøːl]) is a municipality in the Vogtlandkreis district, in Kurze Str., Saxony, Germany.
