= Gotha Ost station =

Railway station in Gotha, Germany

Gotha Ost
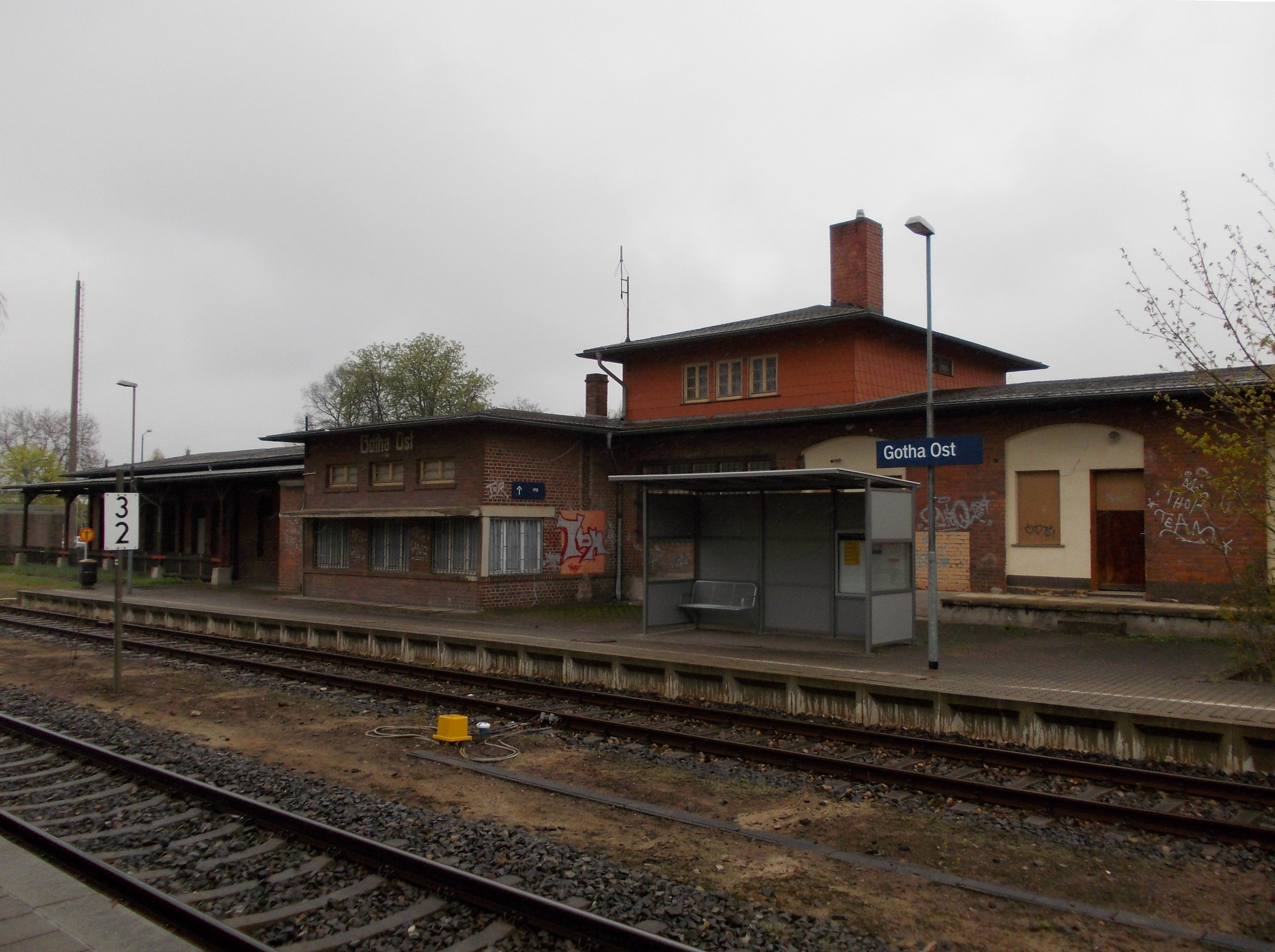
- 2013

General information
- Location: Kindleber Straße 97; 99867 Gotha; Thuringia; Germany
- Coordinates: 50.9618°N 10.7206°E
- System: Bf
- Owner: Deutsche Bahn
- Operator: DB Station&Service
- Lines: Gotha–Leinefelde railway (KBS 604)
- Platforms: 2 side platforms
- Tracks: 2
- Train operators: DB Regio Südost
- Connections: RB 53; 2 3; 810 890 891 892

Construction
- Parking: yes
- Cycle facilities: no
- Accessible: yes

Other information
- Station code: 2210
- DS100 code: UGOS
- IBNR: 8011678
- Category: 6
- Fare zone: VMT
- Website: www.bahnhof.de

Services
Preceding station	DB Regio Südost	Following station
Bufleben towards Bad Langensalza	RB 53	Gotha Terminus
Location
- Location within Thuringia Location within Germany Location within Europe

Gotha Ost station (German: Bahnhof Gotha Ost) is a railway station in the municipality of Gotha, located in the Gotha district in Thuringia, Germany.

== Notable places nearby ==
- Gotha East Airfield
