= Leinefelde–Treysa railway =

Railway line in Germany

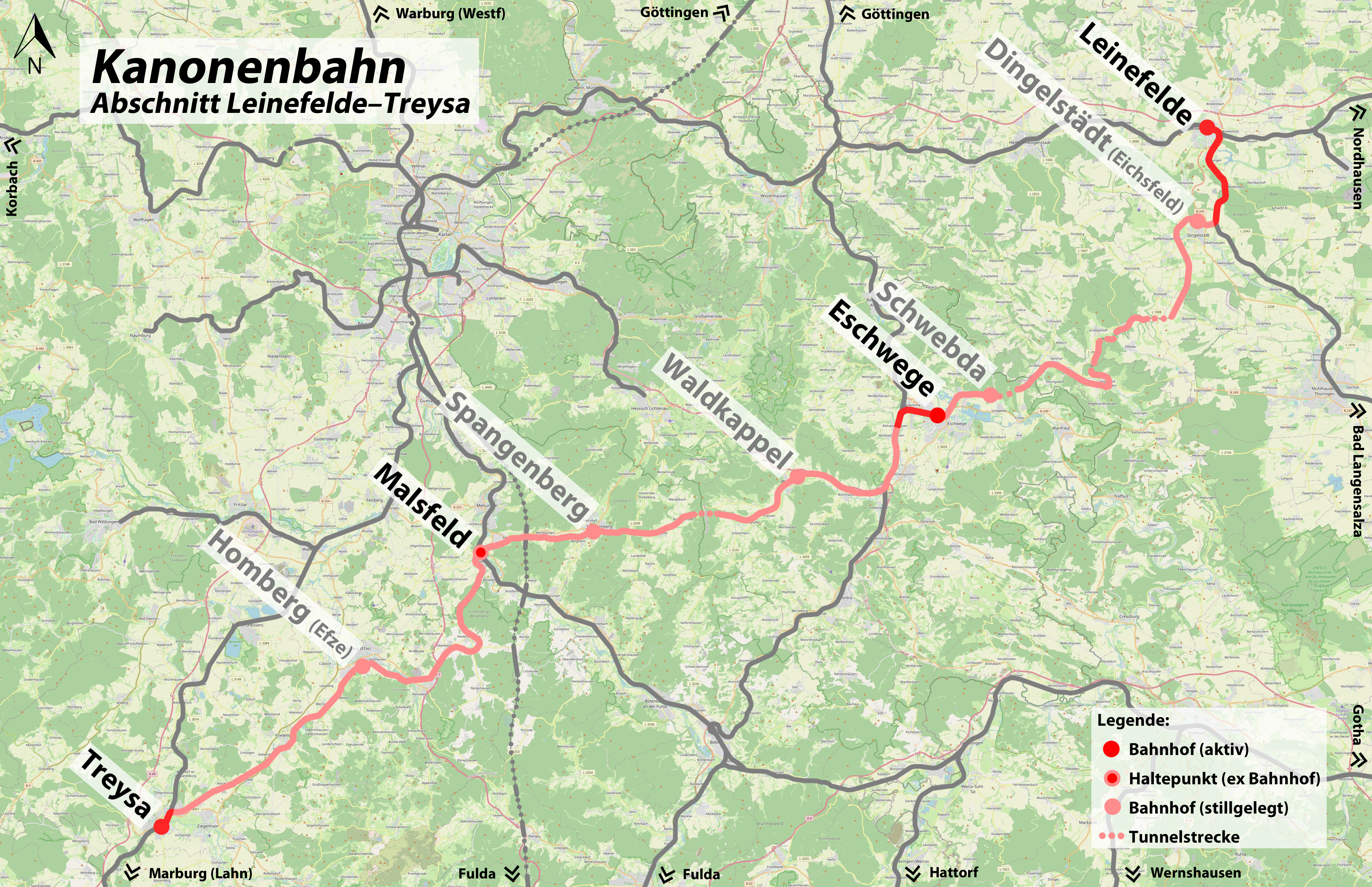

Overview
- Line number: 6710
- Locale: Thuringia, Hesse, Germany

Service
- Route number: 613 Bebra–Göttingen – Eschwege line; formerly 522 Waldkappel–Eschwege; formerly 525 Treysa–Waldkappel

Technical
- Line length: 130.0 km (80.8 mi)
- Track gauge: 1,435 mm (4 ft 8 1/2 in) standard gauge

The Leinefelde–Treysa line is a former railway line in the German states of Thuringia and Hesse, connecting the towns of Leinefelde, Eschwege, Spangenberg, Malsfeld, Homberg (Efze) and Treysa with one another. It was mostly opened in sections between 1875 and 1880 as part of the Cannons Railway (German: Kanonenbahn), a military strategic railway.

== History ==
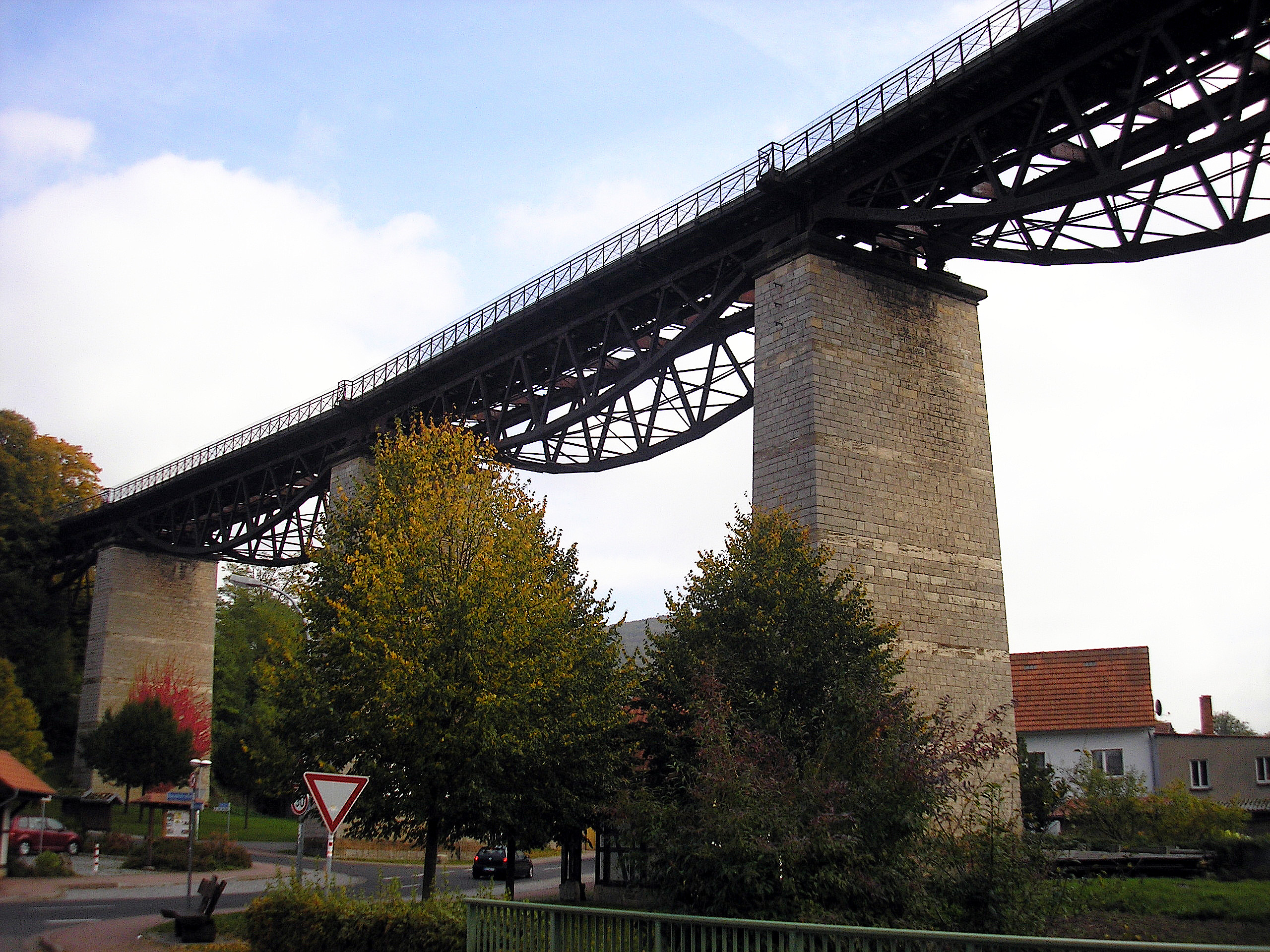
Lengenfeld viaduct

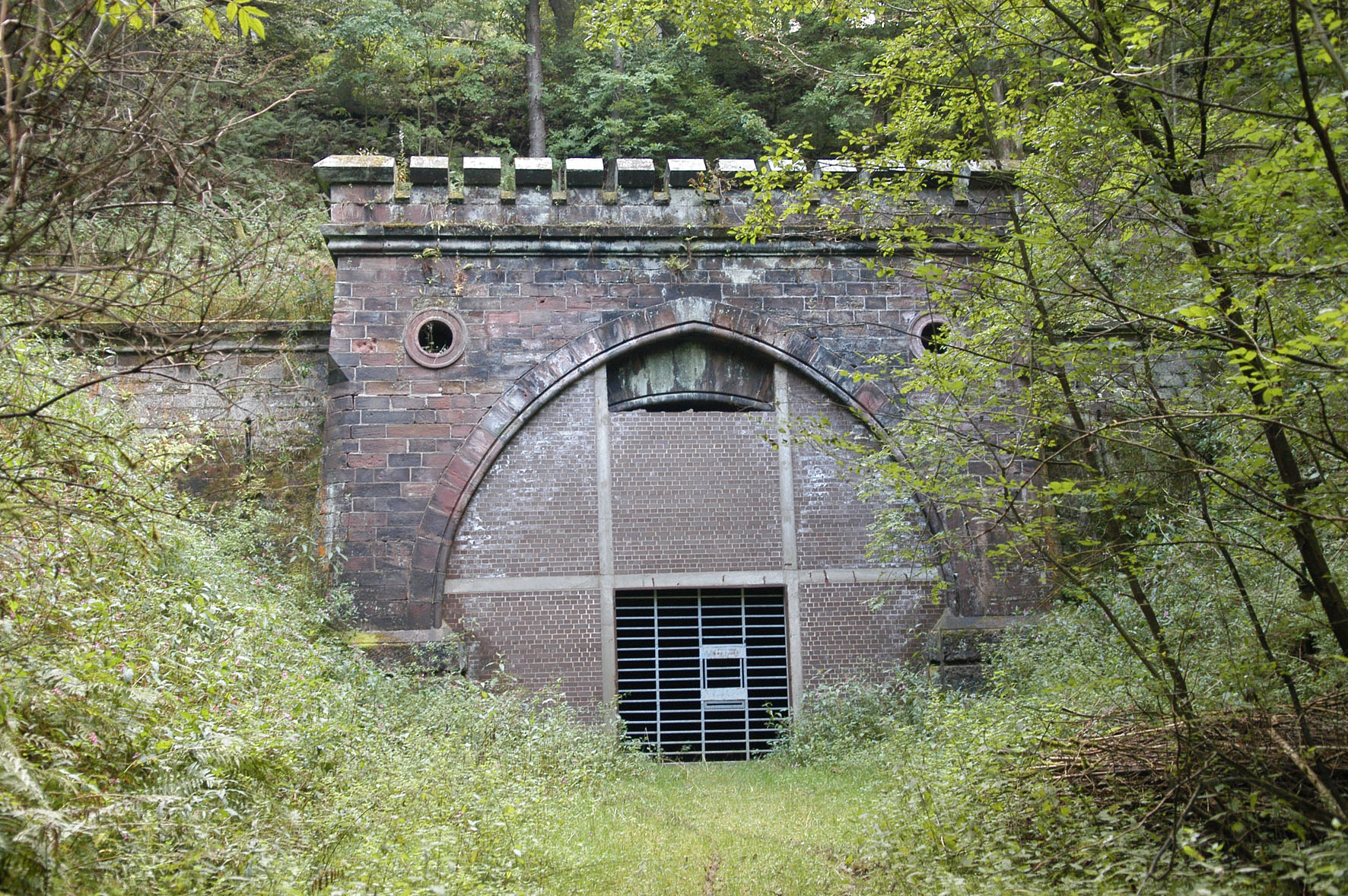
East portal of Bischofferod Tunnel

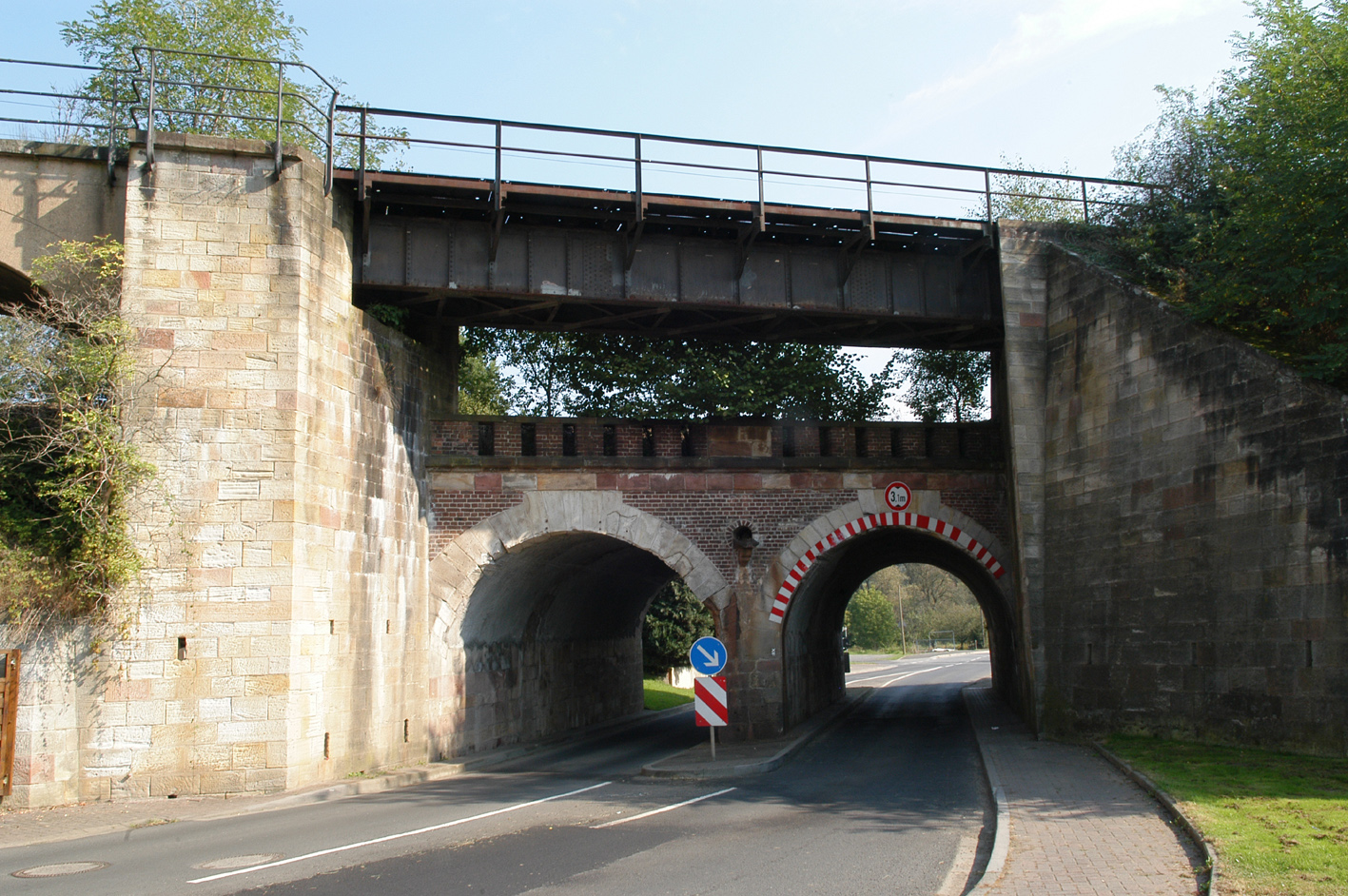
Intersection of Frederick William Northern Railway (high level) and Cannons Railway (mid level) at Malsfeld

The Leinefelde–Silberhausen section was opened on 3 October 1870 as part of the Gotha–Leinefelde railway, which was built as part of a Hanover–Göttingen–Gotha–south Germany link and as result ran from the eastern end of Leinefelde station. Thus, trains on the Cannons Railway, when it was opened, had to change direction at the station.

On 31 October 1875, the section between Eschwege and Eschwege West (then called Niederhone) was opened together with the Bebra–Eschwege-West line. The Niederhone–Treysa section followed on 15 May 1879. On 15 May 1880 this was followed by the opening of the Silberhausen–Eschwege section.

Overall, the track had a complicated route with many bridges and tunnels, in order to provide a maximum grade of 1:50 so that heavy military trains could run on the line. At the beginning of the 20th century, a second track was built for the same reason. But contrary to all planning, military trains used the rather poor grades of the Leinefelde–Kassel line. Thus, the planned strategic line was never used for this purpose, except for some diverted trains in World War II.

In the 1920s, the second track was removed and the line was downgraded to a single-track branch line because it had only achieved regional significance.

During the Second World War the line received no major damage, except for the Frieda viaduct, which was demolished in the last days of the war in 1945. The line was closed soon after at the nearby inner German border between Geismar and Schwebda and the viaduct was not rebuilt.

In Hesse, the line was gradually abandoned from the mid-1970s. First, on 26 May 1974 passenger services closed between Malsfeld and Waldkappel and freight traffic closed between Spangenberg and Waldkappel. Passenger traffic closed between Treysa and Malsfeld on 30 May 1981. The same day, the last train ran on the line between Eschwege and Schwebda (along with the branch to Wanfried, the remaining part of the Schwebda–Wartha line). At On 31 May 1985 the last passenger train ran between Eschwege West and Waldkappel (along with the line to Kassel, the Kassel–Waldkappel railway, now partly reopened as part of RegioTram Kassel). Next day Eschwege-West–Eschwege services closed.

The transport of freight was abandoned between Eschwege and Schwebda on 1 October 1994 and between Eschwege and Eschwege West on 15 December 2002. The carriage of freight and passengers between Homberg and Oberbeisheim ended in 1981. Services closed between Malsfeld and Oberbeisheim on 31 December 1988. On 31 May 1986 freight services ended between Pfieffe and Spangenberg on 1 September 1994 freight services closed from Malsfeld. At that time, the southern curve at Malsfeld was used for operations at this time as the northern curve had been shut down earlier. Daily freight service ran between Homberg and Treysa until 25 June 2002. Freight trains could operate between Eschwege West and Waldkappel until 31 December 1991.

In Thuringia, Geismar was served by passenger services until 31 December 1992. Freight operations were closed west of Dingelstädt in 1970. Passenger services operated to Küllstedt until 28 May 1994, when they were cut back to Dingelstädt. On 2 August 1996 passenger services were abandoned west of Silberhausen; freight services had been abandoned at the beginning of the year.

== Current situation ==
The structures of the closed sections of the Cannons Railway are intended to be preserved.

The section between Leinefelde and the former junction station of Silberhausen continues in operation as part of the Gotha–Leinefelde line. There is however no track connection to the Cannons Railway towards Eschwege anymore.

The Eschwege–Eschwege-West section has been reactivated and electrified for regional services operated by the Hessische Landesbahn (Hessian State Railway). The reopening took place on 12 December 2009. After the completion of renovation work, Eschwege West station was abandoned and replaced by two new stations at Eschwege-Niederhone and Eschwege town. The line is served by line R 7 (Göttingen–Eichenberg–Eschwege–Bebra), operated by cantus Verkehrsgesellschaft. It runs via Niederhone and Eschwege, where trains have to reverse.

Since 24 July 2010, a section of the old line (58.9 to 60.8 km marks) between Bischhausen and Waldkappel is used as a cycle track, which is used to illustrate the signalling system. This includes a level crossing where the users of the “railway” (cyclists) have priority over the road. This is unique in Germany.

The towns of Schwalmstadt and Homberg, the community of Frielendorf and the Schwalm-Eder district favour the reopening of the Homberg (Efze)–Treysa section.
