= Döllstädt station =

Railway station in Döllstädt, Germany

Döllstädt

General information
- Location: Bahnhofstraße 19; 99100 Döllstädt; Thuringia; Germany
- Coordinates: 51.0850°N 10.8130°E
- System: Bf
- Owner: Deutsche Bahn
- Operator: DB Station&Service
- Lines: Bad Langensalza–Kühnhausen railway (KBS 603)
- Platforms: 2 side platforms
- Tracks: 2
- Train operators: DB Regio Südost
- Connections: 812 813 892 735b

Construction
- Parking: yes
- Cycle facilities: no
- Accessible: yes

Other information
- Station code: 1257
- DS100 code: UDST
- IBNR: 8010081
- Category: 7
- Fare zone: VMT
- Website: www.bahnhof.de

Services
Preceding station	DB Regio Südost	Following station
Bad Langensalza towards Kassel-Wilhelmshöhe	RE 2	Erfurt Hbf Terminus
Gräfentonna towards Leinefelde	RB 52	Dachwig towards Erfurt Hbf
Location
- Location within Thuringia Location within Germany Location within Europe

Döllstädt station (German: Bahnhof Döllstädt) is a railway station in the municipality of Döllstädt, located in the Gotha district in Thuringia, Germany.
