= Mühlhausen (Thür) station =

Railway station in Mühlhausen/Thüringen, Germany

Mühlhausen (Thür)
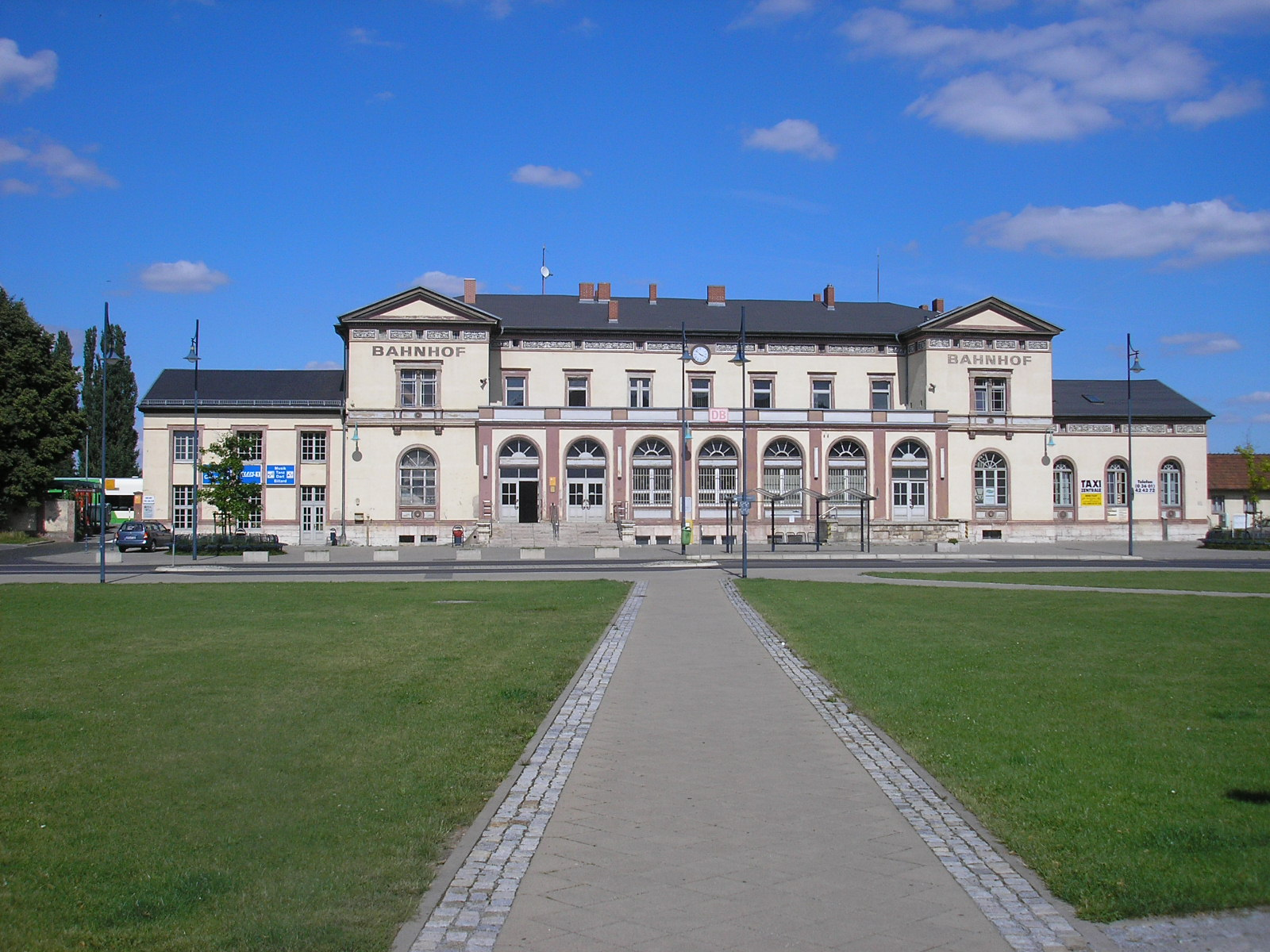
- Entrance building (street side)

General information
- Location: Mühlhausen, Thuringia; Germany
- Coordinates: 51°12′32″N 10°28′26″E
- Owner: Deutsche Bahn
- Operator: DB Station&Service
- Lines: former Ebeleben–Mühlhausen (25.60 km); Gotha–Leinefelde (39.9 km); former Mühlhausen–Treffurt (0.0 km)
- Platforms: 3

Construction
- Accessible: Yes

Other information
- Station code: 4207
- DS100 code: UMH
- Category: 4
- Website: www.bahnhof.de

History
- Opened: 1870

Passengers
- ca. 1500

Services
| Preceding station | DB Regio Südost | Following station |
|---|---|---|
| Leinefelde towards Göttingen | RE 1 | Bad Langensalza towards Glauchau (Sachs) |
| Dachrieden towards Kassel-Wilhelmshöhe | RE 2 | Bad Langensalza towards Erfurt Hbf |
| Ammern towards Leinefelde | RB 52 | Seebach (Mühlhausen) towards Erfurt Hbf |
Location
- Location within Thuringia Location within Germany Location within Europe

Mühlhausen (Thür) station is a passenger station in the Unstrut-Hainich district and the only station in Mühlhausen in the German state of Thuringia. It is located east of the centre of Mühlhausen in the valley of the Unstrut.

== History ==
Mühlhausen was connected to a railway the first time in 1870 with the opening of the Gotha–Leinefelde line of the Thuringian Railway Company (German: Thüringische Eisenbahn-Gesellschaft). A junction station was added to the existing through station in 1897 for the opening of the light railway to Ebeleben by the Mühlhausen-Ebeleben Railway Company (Eisenbahn-Gesellschaft Mühlhausen-Ebeleben, MEE). The Mühlhausen Tramway opened its first line from the station forecourt in 1898. The station was rebuilt with the opening of the line to Treffurt in 1911 and the MEE station was integrated with the former Thuringian Railway Company station, by then part of the Prussian state railways.

In 1969 the tramway was shut down and in the same year freight transport also ended on the last remaining remnant of the line to Treffurt, which was partly closed after the Second World War due to the establishment of the Inner German border Treffurt. Freight services to Ebeleben were closed in 1994 and passenger services ended on 31 May 1997 so that Mühlhausen's period as a junction station came to an end after 100 years.

Since 2000, the station has had no major freight traffic and many of the former freight tracks have been removed.

== Operations ==
In the 2025 timetable Mühlhausen (Thür) station was served by the following lines:

| Line | Route | Frequency (mins) |
|---|---|---|
| RE 1 | Göttingen – Leinefelde – Mühlhausen – Gotha – Erfurt – Gera – Glauchau (Sachs) | 120 |
| RE 2 | Kassel-Wilhelmshöhe – Leinefelde – Mühlhausen – Erfurt | 120 |
| RB 52 | Leinefelde – Mühlhausen – Bad Langensalza – Erfurt | 120 |
