= Leinefelde station =

Railway station in Leinefelde-Worbis, Germany

Leinefelde
- Entrance building

General information
- Location: Conrad-Hentrich-Platz 1, Leinefelde, Leinefelde-Worbis, Thuringia; Germany
- Coordinates: 51°23′20″N 10°19′44″E
- Owner: Deutsche Bahn
- Operator: DB Netz; DB Station&Service
- Lines: Halle–Kassel (km 139.4); Gotha–Leinefelde (km 67.10); Leinefelde–Wulften (km 0.0) (closed); Leinefelde–Treysa (km 0.0) (closed)
- Platforms: 5

Construction
- Accessible: Yes

Other information
- Station code: 3625
- DS100 code: UL
- IBNR: 8010203
- Category: 3
- Website: www.bahnhof.de

History
- Opened: 9 July 1867

Services
Preceding station	Abellio Rail Mitteldeutschland	Following station
Terminus	RE 8	Sollstedt towards Halle (Saale) Hbf
Heilbad Heiligenstadt towards Kassel-Wilhelmshöhe	RE 9	Bleicherode Ost towards Halle (Saale) Hbf
Preceding station	DB Regio Südost	Following station
Heilbad Heiligenstadt towards Göttingen	RE 1	Mühlhausen towards Glauchau (Sachs)
Heilbad Heiligenstadt towards Kassel-Wilhelmshöhe	RE 2	Silberhausen towards Erfurt Hbf
Location
- Location within Thuringia Location within Germany Location within Europe

Leinefelde station is a major railway junction in the German state of Thuringia and is the most important station in Eichsfeld. It is located in the town of Leinefelde in the Thuringian municipality of Leinefelde-Worbis in the Eichsfeld district. The Halle–Kassel and Gotha–Leinefelde railways meet there and in the past the now closed Leinefelde–Wulften and Leinefelde–Treysa railways also connected with the station. The latter route was part of the Kanonenbahn (Cannons Railway) between Berlin and Metz.

== History ==
With the construction of the großen Rheinstraße (Great Rhine Road), the current federal highway 80, between Cologne and Berlin in 1826 and the Reichsstraße (National Road), the current federal highway 247, from Mühlhausen to Duderstadt in 1834, Leinefelde began to develop into a road hub.

With the construction of the Halle–Nordhausen–Leinefelde–Eichenberg–Kassel/Göttingen railway in 1867, Leinefelde was also connected by rail. The Nordhausen–Eichenberg section of the line was officially opened on 9 July 1867. When a few years later the Gotha–Leinefelde railway was opened, the station became a railway junction and it was redesignated as the Zentralbahnhof des Eichsfeldes (Central station of Eichsfeld).

The Kanonenbahn between Berlin and Metz, which runs through Leinefelde, was completed by the opening of the rail connection from Leinefelde to Eschwege in 1880.

From 1897, Leinefelde was also the starting point of the Leinefelde–Wulften railway, connecting Leinefelde via Breitenbach, Worbis and Wintzingerode and Duderstadt with the South Harz Railway (Südharzstrecke). The line was interrupted between Teistungen and Duderstadt from 1945 by the establishment of the inner German border. Operations on the line were gradually reduced until traffic ended on the last part of the line in 2001 and it finally dismantled by 2005.

The Kanonenbahn was also interrupted by the establishment of the inner German border between Schwebda (Hesse) and Geismar (Thuringia), which greatly reduced the importance of the Hessian section of the line. Passenger services were gradually reduced until they were discontinued in 1994 and a little later this part of the line was closed.

A second track was added to the Halle–Hann. Münden railway and it was electrified up to 1994 as part of German Unity Transport Project No. 6 (Verkehrsprojekt Deutsche Einheit Nr. 6). An electronic interlocking was established in Leinefelde station as one of the first in Thuringia, controlling the Heilbad Heiligenstadt–Gernrode and Leinefelde–Bad Langensalza sections.

== Platforms ==
The platform are fully accessible by lifts.

Tracks	Length in m	Height in cm
1	306	55
2	324	55
3	306	55
6	215	55
10	181	34

== Rail services ==
From the 2009/2010 timetable change on 13 December 2009 until the timetable change on 2014/2015, there were services on Friday of the Kyffhäuser Intercity service from Frankfurt am Main via Kassel-Wilhelmshöhe and Halle (Saale) to Leipzig, which also stopped in Leinefelde. The return service from Leipzig to Frankfurt ran on Sundays. This weekly service was the only long-distance service on the line.

In the 2017 timetable, Leinefelde station is served by the following services:

Line	Route	Interval (min)	Operator
RE 1	Göttingen – Leinefelde – Gotha – Erfurt – Jena-Göschwitz – Gera – Gößnitz – Glauchau	120	DB Regio Südost
RE 2	Kassel-Wilhelmshöhe – Eichenberg – Leinefelde – Mühlhausen – Bad Langensalza – Erfurt	120	DB Regio Südost
RE 8	Leinefelde – Nordhausen – Sangerhausen – Halle – Bitterfeld (– Dessau)	120	Abellio
RE 9	Kassel-Wilhelmshöhe – Eichenberg – Leinefelde – Nordhausen – Sangerhausen – Halle – Bitterfeld	120	Abellio
RB 52	Leinefelde – Mühlhausen – Bad Langensalza – Erfurt	120	DB Regio Südost
RB 57	Heilbad Heiligenstadt – Leinefelde – Nordhausen (– Berga-Kelbra – Sangerhausen)	some trains	Abellio
