= Jena-Zwätzen station =

Railway station in Jena, Germany

Jena-Zwätzen
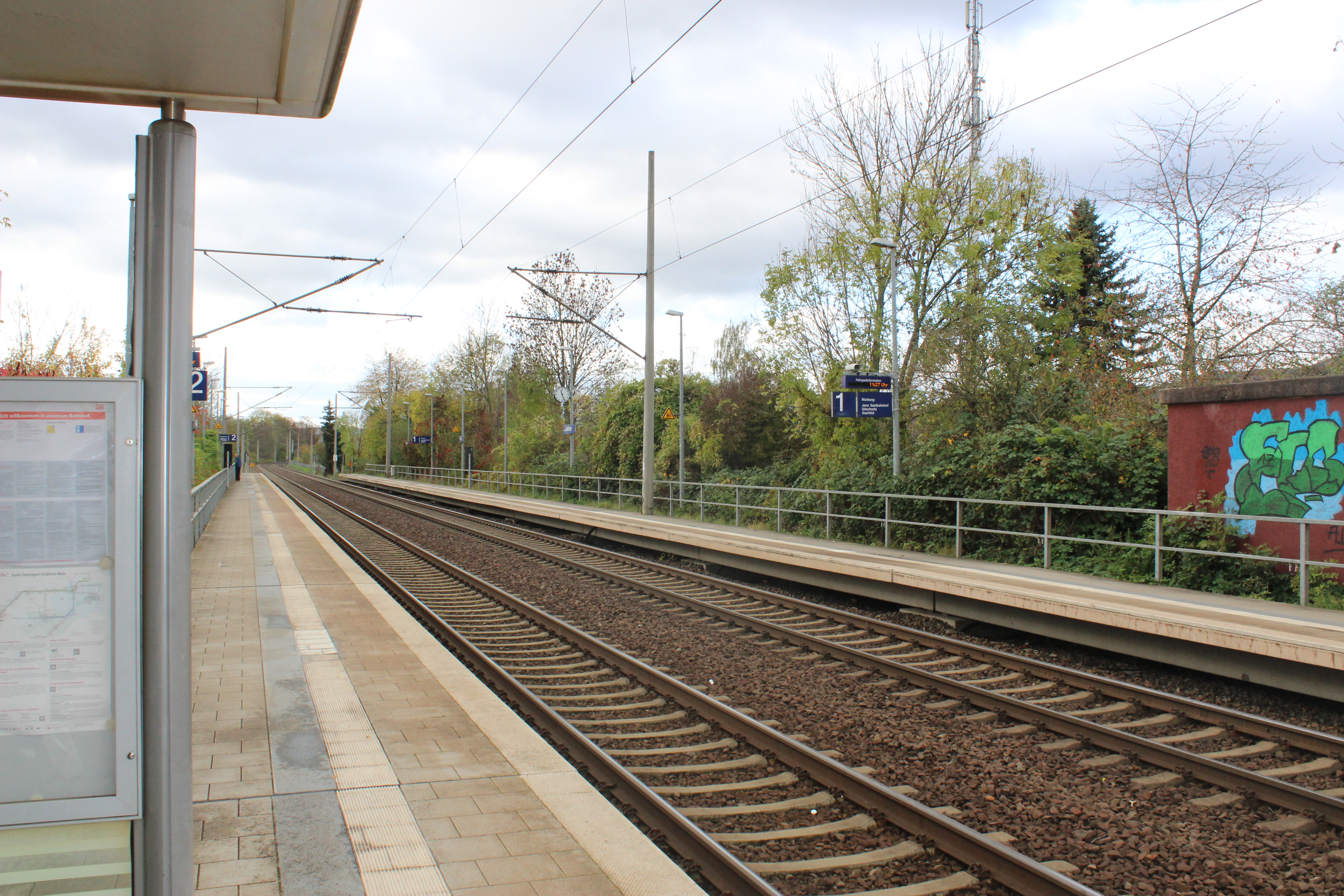
- 2017

General information
- Location: Brückenstraße; 07743 Jena; Thuringia; Germany
- Coordinates: 50°57′19″N 11°37′14″E
- System: Hp
- Owner: Deutsche Bahn
- Operator: DB Station&Service
- Lines: Großheringen–Saalfeld railway (KBS 560)
- Platforms: 2 side platforms
- Tracks: 2
- Train operators: Abellio Rail Mitteldeutschland
- Connections: RB 25

Construction
- Accessible: yes

Other information
- Station code: 3046
- DS100 code: UJZ
- IBNR: 8011958
- Category: 6
- Fare zone: VMT
- Website: www.bahnhof.de

History
- Opened: 19 May 1877; 149 years ago

Services
Preceding station	Abellio Rail Mitteldeutschland	Following station
Jena Saale towards Saalfeld (Saale)	RB 25	Porstendorf towards Halle (Saale) Hbf
Location
- Location within Thuringia Location within Germany Location within Europe

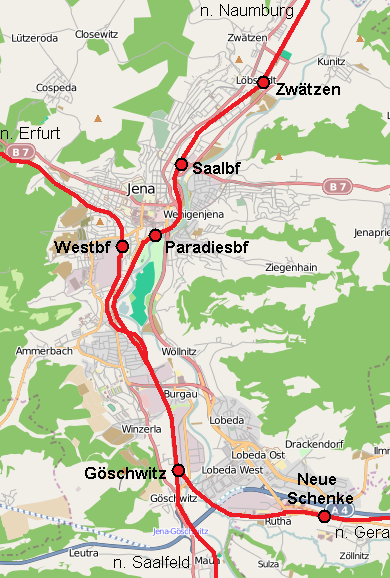
Location of the station in the city

Jena-Zwätzen station is a railway station in Jena, Thuringia, Germany. It is a small, unstaffed station on the Großheringen - Saalfeld railway. The route and the stations were established in 1871. At the time, Zwätzen was an independent village with a monastery. Nowadays, it is part of Jena and has 3100 inhabitants.

The two platforms of the station are wheelchair-accessible. There is no station building. The closest connection to long-distance trains starts in Jena Paradies, 5km south of Zwätzen. Travellers can use either local trains, or bus and tram connections stopping near the station.

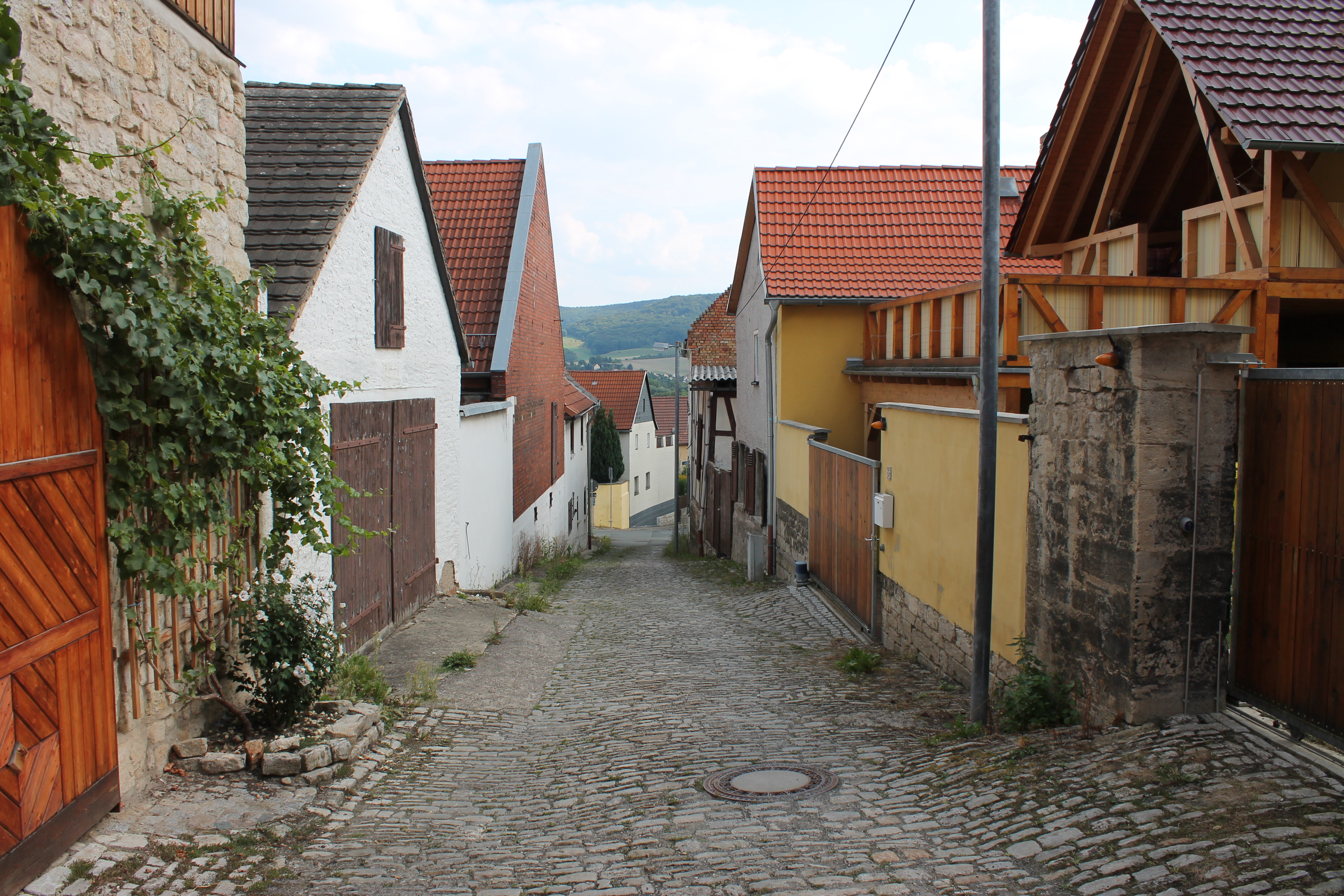
historical village of Zwätzen
