= List of FlixTrain services in Germany =

The List of FlixTrain services in Germany provides a list of all railway services of FlixTrain (FLX) in Germany.

== 2023 Timetable ==
The information is up to date to July 2023. The 2023 timetable shows that Flixtrain operates the following routes:

Line	Route	Frequency	KBS	Material	Image
FLX 10	Stuttgart – (Wiesloch-Walldorf – ) Heidelberg – Mannheim Neu-Edingen/Friedrichsfeld – Darmstadt – Frankfurt (Main) Süd – Fulda – Eisenach – Gotha – Erfurt – Halle (Saale) – Berlin Südkreuz – Berlin Hauptbahnhof – (Berlin Gesundbrunnen)	Up to 3× per day	1240 1241; 1243 1244; 1246 1247	Siemens ES64U2 + railway coaches	
FLX 10	Stuttgart – (Wiesloch-Walldorf – ) Heidelberg – Mannheim Neu-Edingen/Friedrichsfeld – Darmstadt – Frankfurt (Main) Süd – Fulda – Bad Hersfeld – Eisenach – Gotha – Erfurt – Halle (Saale) – Berlin Südkreuz – Berlin Hauptbahnhof	Up to 3× per day	1240 1241; 1243 1244; 1246 1247	Siemens ES64U2 + railway coaches	
FLX 10	(Basel Bad. – Weil am Rhein – Freiburg – Offenburg – Baden-Baden – Karlsruhe – ) (Wiesloch-Walldorf – ) Heidelberg – Mannheim Neu-Edingen/Friedrichsfeld – Darmstadt – Frankfurt (Main) Süd – Fulda – Eisenach – Gotha – Erfurt – Halle (Saale) – Berlin Südkreuz – Berlin Hauptbahnhof	Up to 1× per day	1240 1241; 1243 1244; 1246 1247	Siemens ES64U2 + railway coaches	
FLX 15	Hamburg Hauptbahnhof – Hamburg-Harburg – (Lüneburg) – Hannover – Göttingen – Kassel-Wilhelmshöhe – Marburg – Gießen – Friedberg – Frankfurt (Main) West – (Darmstadt) – (Mannheim Hauptbahnhof) – (Heidelberg) – Stuttgart	5× per week	1800 1802; 1804 1805; 1807		
FLX 20	Köln – Düsseldorf – Duisburg – Essen – Gelsenkirchen – Münster – Osnabrück – Hamburg-Harburg – Hamburg Hauptbahnhof	Up to 2× per day	1340 1341; 1342 1343	Siemens ES64U2 + railway coaches	
FLX 30	(Aachen –) Köln – Düsseldorf – Duisburg – Essen – Bochum – Dortmund – Hamm – Gütersloh – Bielefeld – (Herford) – Hannover – Stendal – (Berlin-Spandau) – Berlin Hauptbahnhof (– Berlin Südkreuz – Lutherstadt Wittenberg – Leipzig Hauptbahnhof – Dresden-Neustadt – Dresden Hauptbahnhof)	Up to 2× per day	1230 1233; 1235 1236; 1239	Siemens ES64U2 + railway coaches	
FLX 30	Köln – (Neuss) – Düsseldorf – Duisburg – Essen – Bochum – Dortmund – Hamm – Gütersloh – Bielefeld – (Herford) – Hannover – Stendal – (Berlin-Spandau) – Berlin Hauptbahnhof	Up to 2× per day	1230 1233; 1235 1236; 1239	Siemens ES64U2 + railway coaches	
FLX 35	Hamburg Hauptbahnhof – Berlin-Spandau – Berlin-Charlottenburg – Berlin Hauptbahnhof – Berlin Ostbahnhof – Berlin Südkreuz – Leipzig Hauptbahnhof	Up to 2× per day	1321 1326; 1331 1356; 1375 1358; 1360 1361; 1365		

== See also ==
- List of scheduled railway routes in Germany
