= Beise =

Beise may refer to:

- Sheldon Beise (1911–1960), American football player and coach
- Beise (Fulda), a river of Hesse, Germany, tributary of the Fulda
- one of the Royal and noble ranks of the Qing dynasty in China
