= Heilbad Heiligenstadt station =

Railway station in Heilbad Heiligenstadt, Germany

Heilbad Heiligenstadt
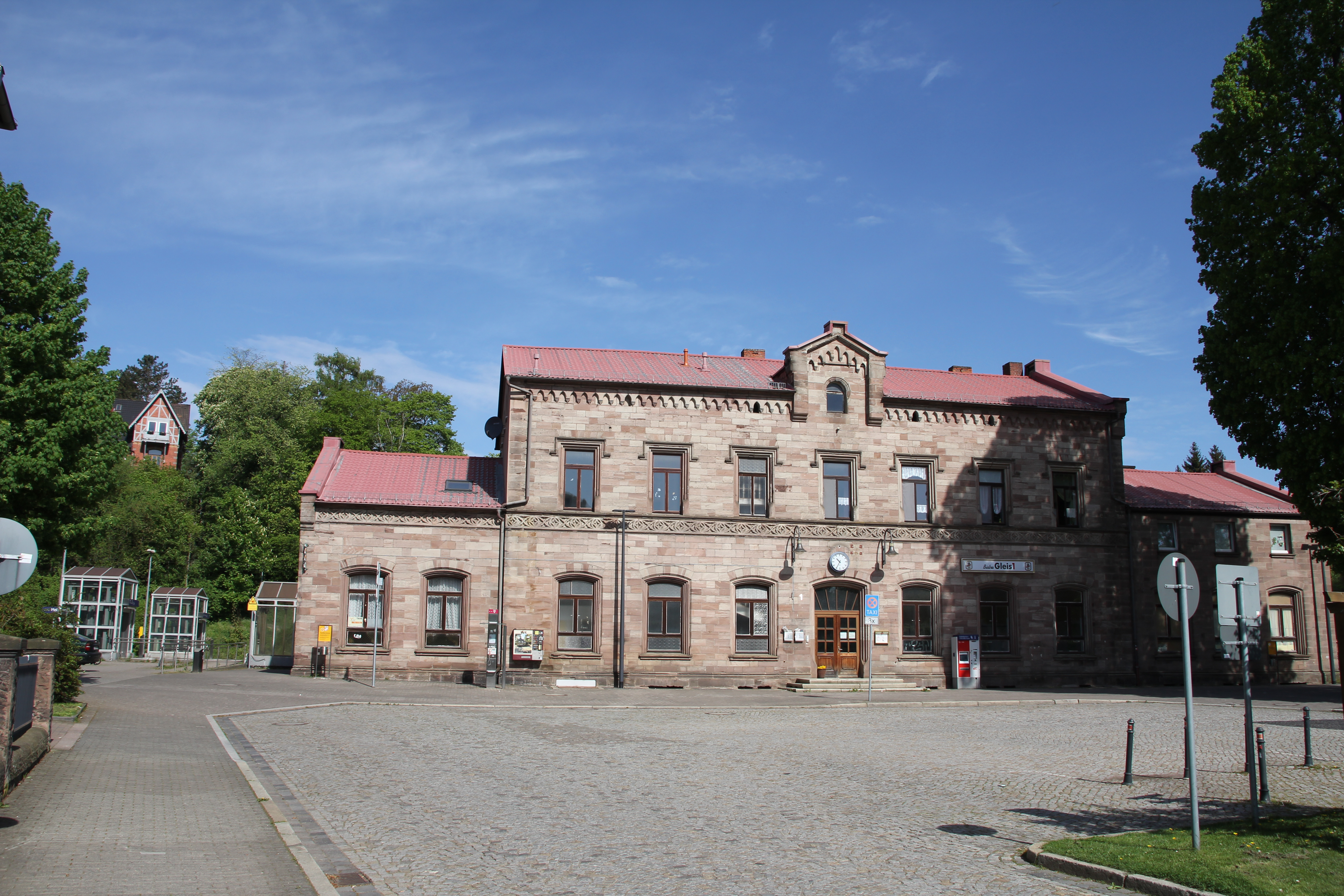
- 2018

General information
- Location: Bahnhofsplatz 1; 37308 Heilbad Heiligenstadt; Thuringia; Germany
- Coordinates: 51.3770°N 10.1241°E
- System: Bf
- Owner: DB Netz
- Operator: DB Station&Service
- Lines: Halle–Hann. Münden railway (KBS 600); Heiligenstadt–Schwebda railway
- Platforms: 1 island platform 1 side platform
- Tracks: 3
- Train operators: Abellio Rail Mitteldeutschland; DB Regio Südost

Construction
- Parking: yes
- Cycle facilities: yes
- Accessible: yes

Other information
- Station code: 2654
- DS100 code: UHT
- IBNR: 8011849
- Category: 4
- Website: www.bahnhof.de

Services
Preceding station	DB Regio Südost	Following station
Göttingen Terminus	RE 1	Leinefelde towards Glauchau (Sachs)
Uder towards Kassel-Wilhelmshöhe	RE 2	Leinefelde towards Erfurt Hbf
Preceding station	Abellio Rail Mitteldeutschland	Following station
Eichenberg towards Kassel-Wilhelmshöhe	RE 9	Leinefelde towards Halle (Saale) Hbf
Terminus	RB 57	Bodenrode towards Nordhausen
Location
- Location within Thuringia Location within Germany Location within Europe

Heilbad Heiligenstadt station is a railway station in the municipality of Heilbad Heiligenstadt, located in the Eichsfeld district in Thuringia, Germany.
