= Gotha station =

Railway station in Germany

Gotha
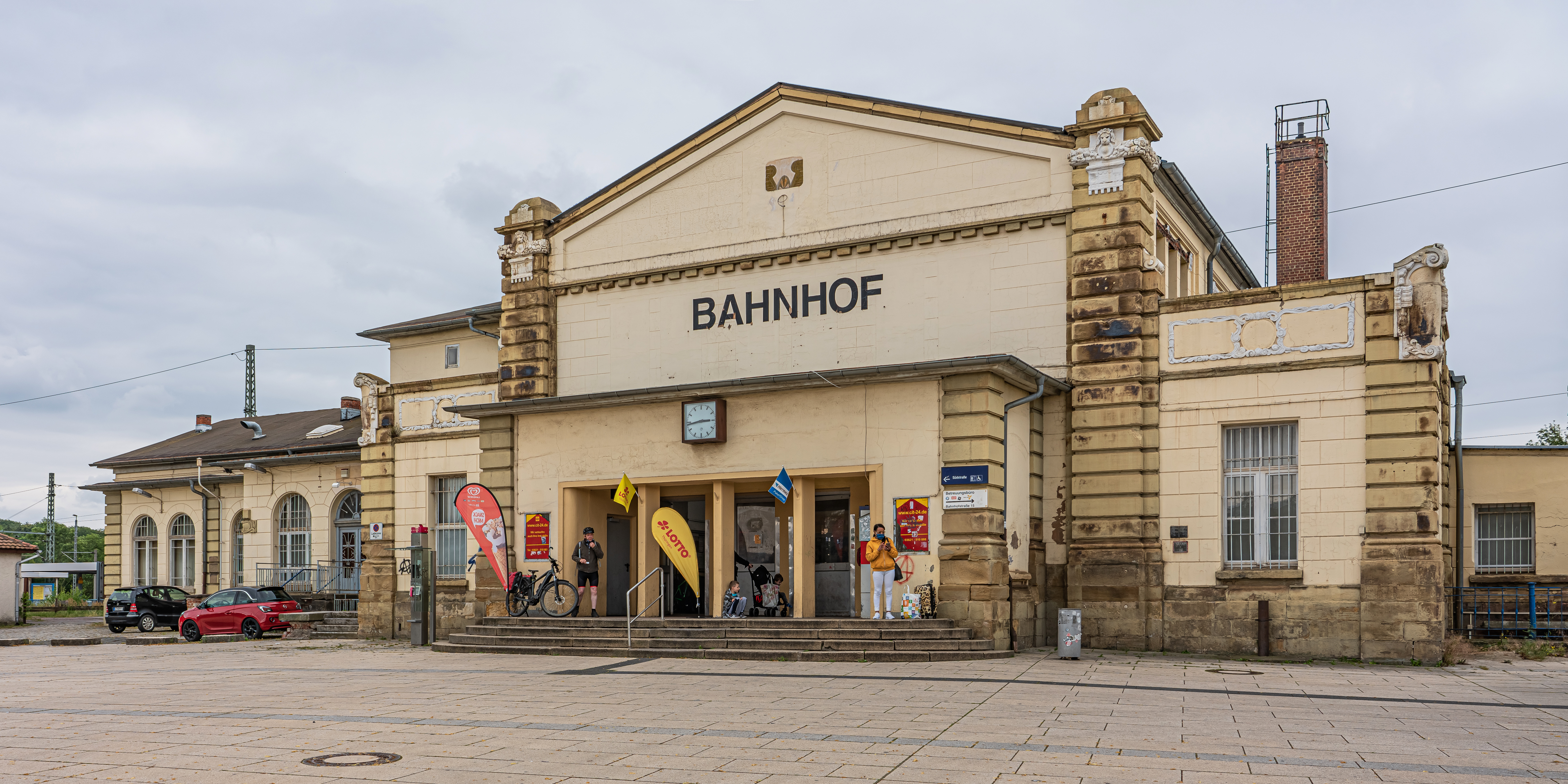
- Entrance building in 2020

General information
- Location: Bahnhofstr. 13, Gotha, Thuringia; Germany
- Coordinates: 50°56′21″N 10°42′50″E
- Owner: Deutsche Bahn
- Operator: DB InfraGO
- Lines: Gotha–Gräfenroda (KBS 572); Erfurt–Nordhausen (KBS 601); Gotha–Leinefelde (KBS 604); Erfurt–Bebra (KBS 605)
- Platforms: 5

Construction
- Accessible: Yes
- Architectural style: Neoclassical

Other information
- Station code: 2209
- DS100 code: UGO
- IBNR: 8010136
- Category: 3
- Fare zone: VMT
- Website: www.bahnhof.de

History
- Opened: 1847

Passengers
- ca. 4000

Services
Preceding station	DB Fernverkehr	Following station
Eisenach Hbf One-way operation	ICE 15	Erfurt Hbf towards Ostseebad Binz
Eisenach Hbf towards Dresden Hbf	ICE 50	Erfurt Hbf towards Wiesbaden Hbf
Eisenach Hbf towards Frankfurt (Main) Hbf	IC 51	Erfurt Hbf towards Gera Hbf
Preceding station		Following station
Erfurt Hbf towards Berlin Hbf	FLX 10	Eisenach towards Stuttgart Hbf
Preceding station	DB Regio Südost	Following station
Bad Langensalza towards Göttingen	RE 1	Neudietendorf towards Glauchau (Sachs)
Gotha Ost towards Bad Langensalza	RB 53	Terminus
Preceding station	Abellio Rail Mitteldeutschland	Following station
Fröttstädt towards Eisenach	RB 20	Seebergen towards Leipzig Hbf
Location
- Location within Thuringia Location within Germany Location within Europe

Gotha station is the main station of Gotha in the German state of Thuringia. It is served by InterCity trains and every two hours by Intercity-Express trains on the Thuringian Railway. Services on the Gotha–Leinefelde line to the north also serve the station. Passenger services on the Ohra Valley Railway (Ohratalbahn) to the south ended in December 2011.

== History ==
Gotha station was built in 1847, when the local section of the Thuringian line was completed between Halle and Bebra. Gotha was at this time the provincial capital of Saxe-Gotha and had 15,000 inhabitants. The station was built in a neoclassical style. In 1870 the second line was built, the Gotha–Leinefelde railway (Gotha via Mühlhausen to Leinefelde, continuing to Göttingen). The third and last line connecting to Gotha station was the Ohra Valley Railway opened in 1876 to Ohrdruf and to the line to Würzburg at Gräfenroda in 1892 (de).

In 1894 the Gotha tramway was opened. The station was the junction of several tram lines. In 1929, the Thuringian Forest Railway (Thüringerwaldbahn), an overland interurban tramway was opened from Gotha station, running across the city tramlines and continuing to Bad Tabarz via Waltershausen and Friedrichroda. On 6 February 1945, three months before VE day, a USAAF air strike hit the Reichsbahn premises, the passenger station, the Reichsbahn repair workshop (80% destroyed) and the adjacent city centre area.

In 2007, the station forecourt was completely restructured and the stop on the Thuringian Forest Railway was relocated.

== Services ==
The following services stopped at Gotha station in 2022.

Line	Route	Interval (mins)	Operator
ICE 15	Eisenach → Gotha → Erfurt → Halle → Berlin → Eberswalde → Stralsund → Binz	One train	DB Fernverkehr
ICE 50	(Saarbrücken –) Wiesbaden – Frankfurt – Fulda – Eisenach – Gotha – Erfurt – Leipzig – Dresden	120	DB Fernverkehr
IC 51	Frankfurt am Main – Hanau – Schlüchtern – Fulda – Hünfeld – Bad Hersfeld – Eisenach – Gotha – Erfurt	1 train pair	DB Fernverkehr
IC 51	Düsseldorf/Cologne – Kassel – Eisenach – Gotha – Erfurt – Weimar – Jena West – Jena-Göschwitz – Gera	2 train pairs	DB Fernverkehr
IC 51	Kassel-Wilhelmshöhe – Bebra – Eisenach – Gotha – Erfurt – Weimar – Jena – Gera	1 train pair	DB Fernverkehr
IC 51	Leipzig – Weimar – Erfurt – Gotha – Eisenach – Fulda – Hanau – Frankfurt am Main	Some trains, relief trains (Fri, Sun)	DB Fernverkehr
IC 51	Cologne/Düsseldorf – Essen – Bochum – Dortmund – Kassel – Bebra – Gotha – Erfurt – Weimar – Leipzig	Some trains, relief trains (Fri, Sun)	DB Fernverkehr
FLX 10	Berlin Hbf – Berlin Südkreuz – Halle (Saale) – Erfurt – Gotha – Eisenach – Fulda – Frankfurt South – Darmstadt – Weinheim – Heidelberg – Stuttgart	1–2 train pairs daily	
RE 1	Göttingen – Leinefelde – Gotha – Erfurt – Jena-Göschwitz – Gera – Gößnitz – Glauchau (Sachs)	120	DB Regio Südost
RB 20	Eisenach – Gotha – Erfurt – Weimar – Apolda – Naumburg (Saale) – Weißenfels – Leipzig Hbf	60	Abellio Rail Mitteldeutschland
RB 53	Gotha – Gotha Ost – Bufleben – Ballstädt – Eckardtsleben – Bad Langensalza	120	DB Regio Südost

The Thuringian Forest Railway (interurban tramway to Waltershausen) runs from the forecourt.

== See also ==
- Rail transport in Germany
- Railway stations in Germany
