= Beise (Fulda) =

River in Germany

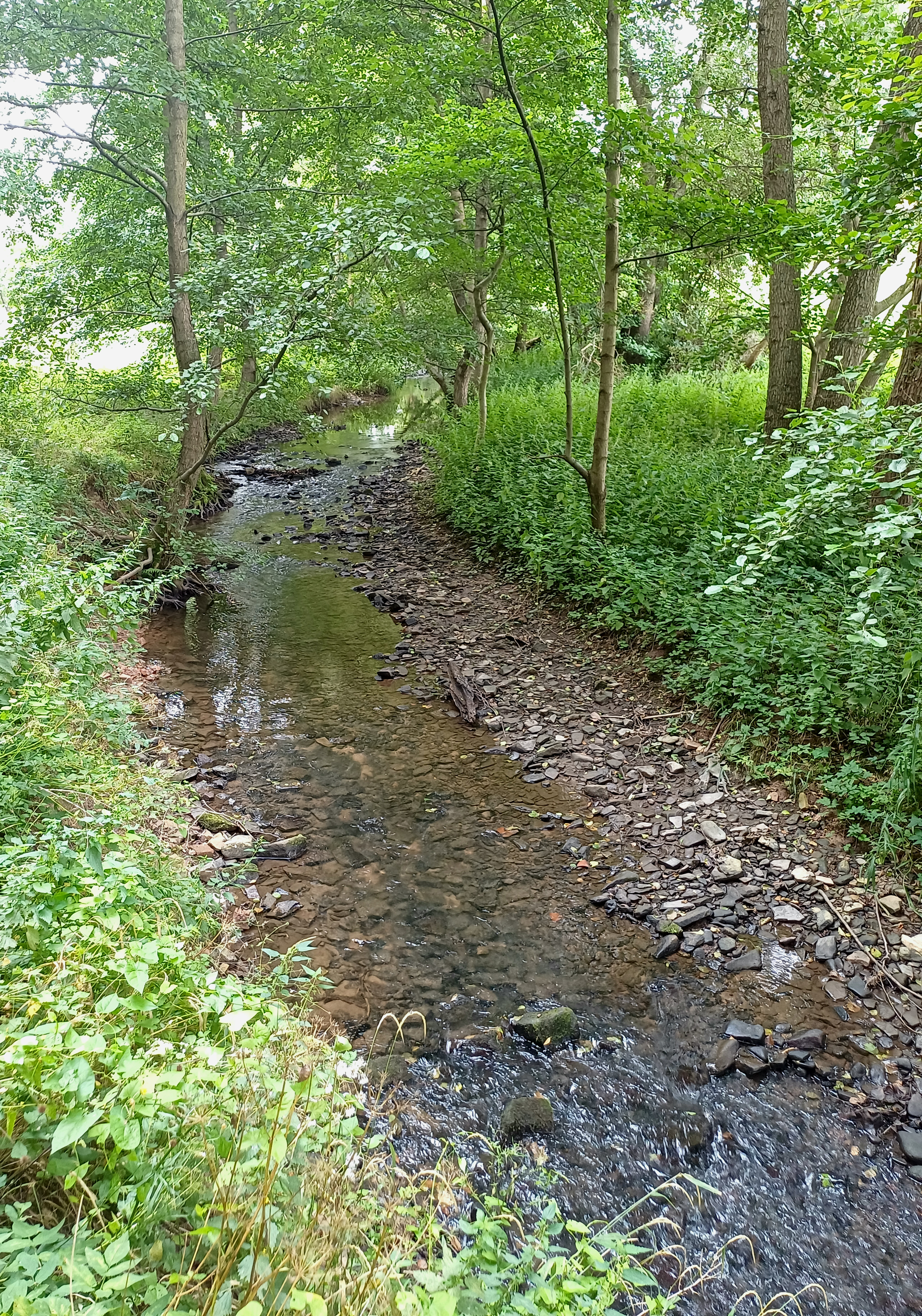

- Location within Germany

Location
- Country: Germany
- State: Hesse

Physical characteristics
- Mouth
  - location: Fulda
  - coordinates: 51.0790°N 9.5485°E
- Length: 20.8 km (12.9 mi)

Basin features
- Progression: Fulda→ Weser→ North Sea

Beise is a river of Hesse, Germany. It is a southwestern tributary of the Fulda and joins it on the left bank near Malsfeld.

== See also ==
- List of rivers of Hesse
