= Bad Langensalza station =

Railway station in Germany

Bad Langensalza
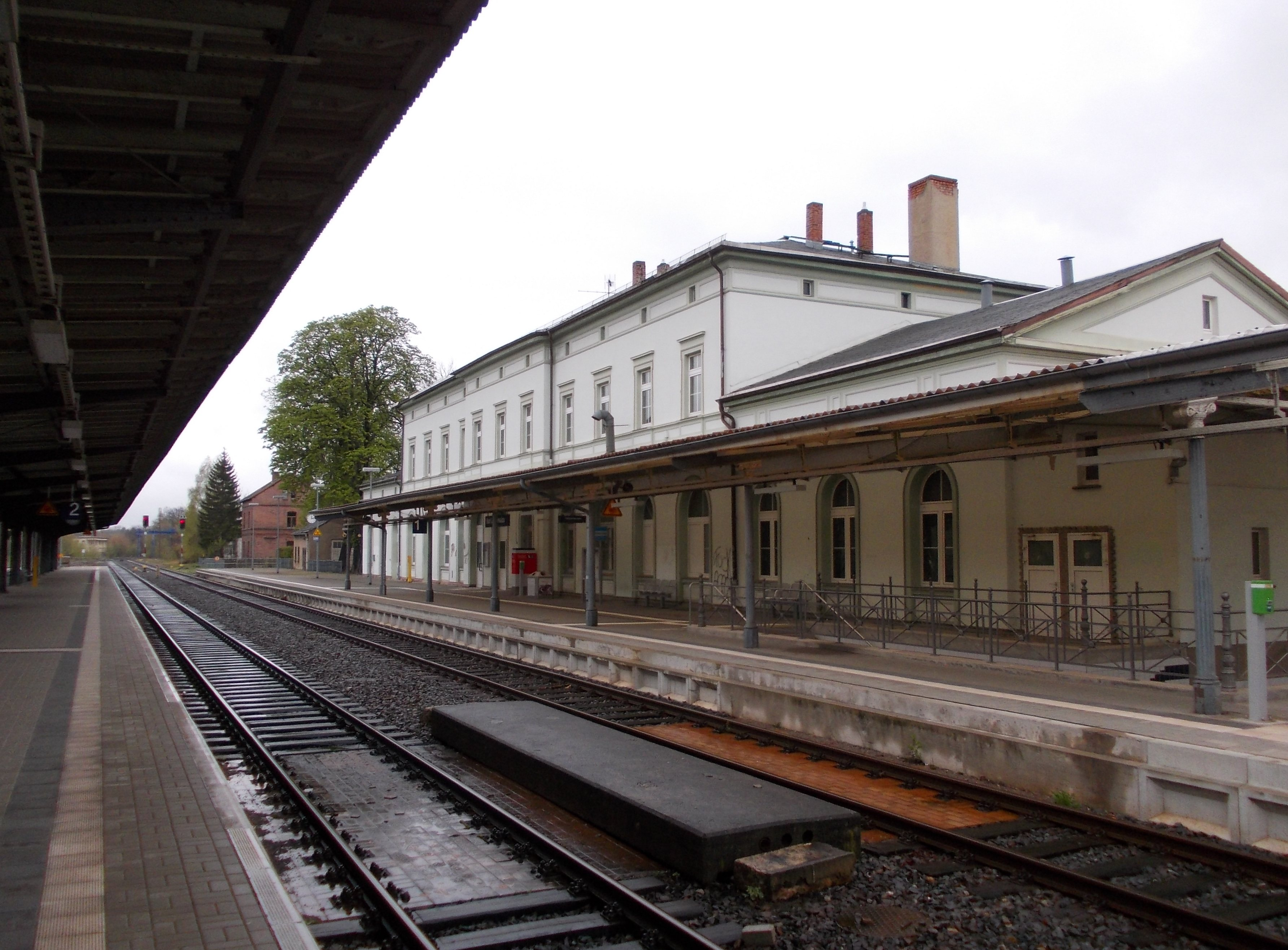
- 2013

General information
- Location: Bahnhofstraße 7; 99947 Bad Langensalza; Thuringia; Germany
- Coordinates: 51.1018°N 10.6409°E
- Elevation: 207 m (679 ft)
- System: Bf
- Owner: Deutsche Bahn
- Operator: DB Station&Service
- Lines: Gotha–Leinefelde railway (KBS 604); Bad Langensalza–Kühnhausen railway (KBS 603); Langensalza Light Railway (KBS 647)
- Platforms: 1 island platform 1 side platform
- Tracks: 4
- Train operators: DB Regio Südost

Construction
- Accessible: yes

Other information
- Station code: 298
- DS100 code: ULS
- IBNR: 8010020
- Category: 4
- Fare zone: VMT
- Website: www.bahnhof.de

History
- Opened: 1870; 156 years ago

Services
Preceding station	DB Regio Südost	Following station
Mühlhausen (Thür) towards Göttingen	RE 1	Gotha towards Glauchau (Sachs)
Mühlhausen (Thür) towards Kassel-Wilhelmshöhe	RE 2	Döllstädt towards Erfurt Hbf
Schönstedt towards Leinefelde	RB 52	Gräfentonna towards Erfurt Hbf
Terminus	RB 53	Eckardtsleben towards Gotha
Location
- Location within Thuringia Location within Germany Location within Europe

Bad Langensalza station is a railway station in Bad Langensalza, Thuringia, Germany.
