= Kallmerode =

- Ortsteil of Leinefelde-Worbis
- Coat of arms
- Interactive map of Kallmerode
- Location within Germany Location within Thuringia
- Coordinates: 51°21′2″N 10°18′23″E
- Country: Germany
- State: Thuringia
- District: Eichsfeld
- Town: Leinefelde-Worbis

Area
  - Total: 5.61 km^{2} (2.17 sq mi)
- Elevation: 375 m (1,230 ft)

Population (2017-12-31)
  - Total: 601
  - Density: 107/km^{2} (277/sq mi)
- Time zone: UTC+01:00 (CET)
  - Summer (DST): UTC+02:00 (CEST)
- Postal codes: 37327
- Dialling codes: 03605
- Vehicle registration: EIC

Kallmerode (German pronunciation: [kalməˈʁoːdə]) is a village and a former municipality in the district of Eichsfeld in Thuringia, Germany. Since 1 January 2019, it is part of the town Leinefelde-Worbis.
