= Leinefelde-Worbis =

- Town
- Coat of arms

- Location of Leinefelde-Worbis within Eichsfeld district
- Interactive map of Leinefelde-Worbis
- Location within Germany Location within Thuringia
- Coordinates: 51°23′N 10°20′E
- Country: Germany
- State: Thuringia
- District: Eichsfeld
- Subdivisions: 10

Government
  - Mayor (2022–28): Christian Zwingmann

Area
  - Total: 115.79 km^{2} (44.71 sq mi)
- Elevation: 320 m (1,050 ft)

Population (2025-12-31)
  - Total: 19,957
  - Density: 172.36/km^{2} (446.40/sq mi)
- Time zone: UTC+01:00 (CET)
  - Summer (DST): UTC+02:00 (CEST)
- Postal codes: 37327, 37339
- Dialling codes: 03605, 036074
- Vehicle registration: EIC, HIG, WBS
- Website: www.leinefelde-worbis.de

Leinefelde-Worbis (German pronunciation: [ˌlaɪnəˈfɛldə ˈvɔʁbɪs]) is a town in the district of Eichsfeld, in northwestern Thuringia, Germany. The town was formed on March 16, 2004, from the former independent towns Leinefelde and Worbis along with the municipalities of Breitenbach and Wintzingerode. In July 2018 the former municipality of Hundeshagen, and in January 2019 Kallmerode was merged into Leinefelde-Worbis. The population before the amalgamation was 14,387 for Leinefelde, 5,541 for Worbis, 1,021 for Breitenbach and 614 for Wintzingerode. The 10 parts of Leinefelde-Worbis are Leinefelde, Worbis, Breitenbach, Kirchohmfeld, Birkungen, Beuren, Hundeshagen, Kaltohmfeld, Wintzingrode, Kallmerode and Breitenholz.

== Climate ==
Climate data for Leinefelde (1991–2020 normals)
Month	Jan	Feb	Mar	Apr	May	Jun	Jul	Aug	Sep	Oct	Nov	Dec	Year
Mean daily maximum °C (°F)	2.6 (36.7)	3.7 (38.7)	7.8 (46.0)	13.2 (55.8)	17.1 (62.8)	20.3 (68.5)	22.8 (73.0)	22.8 (73.0)	18.0 (64.4)	12.5 (54.5)	6.8 (44.2)	3.4 (38.1)	12.6 (54.7)
Daily mean °C (°F)	0.3 (32.5)	0.9 (33.6)	4.0 (39.2)	8.4 (47.1)	12.2 (54.0)	15.3 (59.5)	17.5 (63.5)	17.4 (63.3)	13.4 (56.1)	8.9 (48.0)	4.4 (39.9)	1.2 (34.2)	8.6 (47.5)
Mean daily minimum °C (°F)	−2.2 (28.0)	−1.9 (28.6)	0.4 (32.7)	3.6 (38.5)	7.1 (44.8)	10.1 (50.2)	12.4 (54.3)	12.4 (54.3)	9.1 (48.4)	5.6 (42.1)	2.0 (35.6)	−1 (30)	4.8 (40.6)
Average precipitation mm (inches)	58.2 (2.29)	45.6 (1.80)	54.4 (2.14)	41.8 (1.65)	67.9 (2.67)	63.0 (2.48)	82.3 (3.24)	62.6 (2.46)	58.7 (2.31)	51.8 (2.04)	55.8 (2.20)	59.9 (2.36)	697.5 (27.46)
Average precipitation days (≥ 1.0 mm)	17.4	15.5	16.0	12.6	14.4	14.5	15.5	14.1	13.2	15.7	17.0	18.6	184.1
Average snowy days (≥ 1.0 cm)	10.9	12.3	5.9	1.0	0	0	0	0	0	0	2.8	8.2	41.1
Average relative humidity (%)	87.0	83.3	79.2	72.0	73.9	75.0	73.3	71.8	78.7	84.6	88.3	88.7	79.6
Mean monthly sunshine hours	50.2	73.2	120.4	174.9	206.1	207.0	212.7	199.7	152.1	104.2	50.4	39.2	1,584.7
Source: World Meteorological Organization

== Transport ==
Leinefelde station is located on the Halle–Hann. Münden and the Gotha–Leinefelde railways.

== Bear sanctuary ==
Since 1997 Worbis has become known for its bear sanctuary, the Alternativer Bärenpark Worbis, which is operated by the German animal welfare organisation Stiftung für Bären – Wildtier- und Artenschutz.

== Museums ==
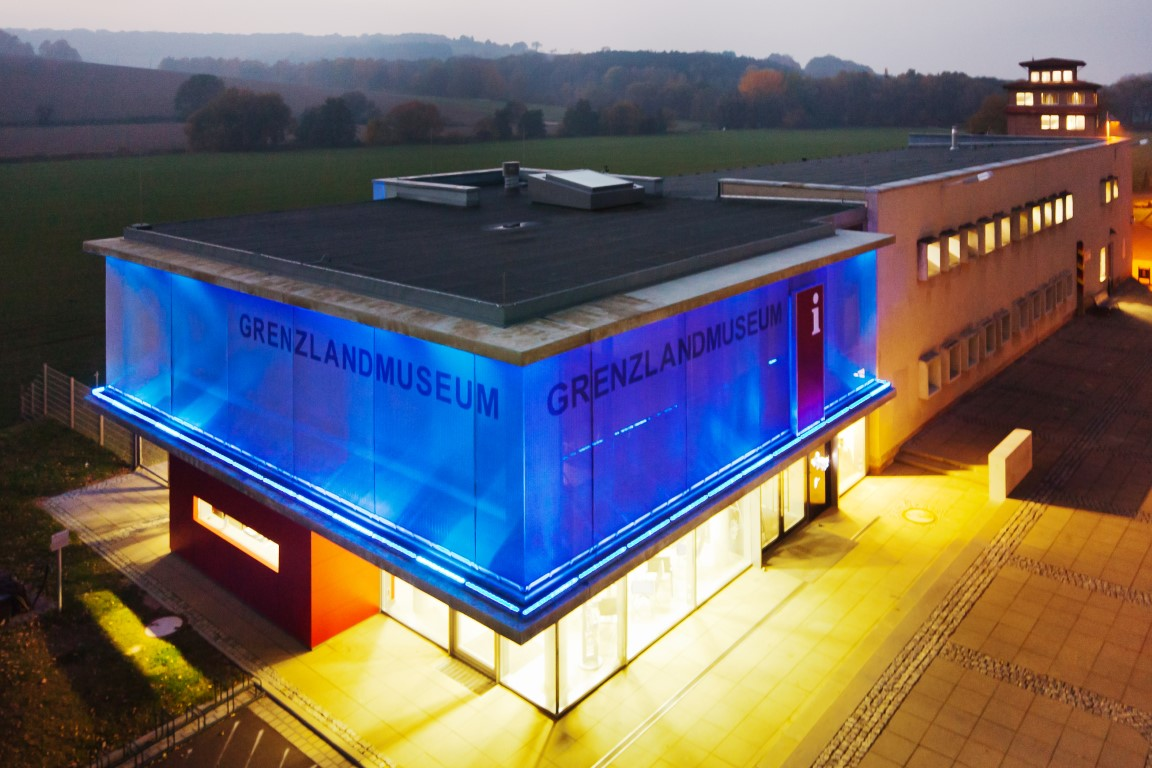
The Borderland Museum Eichsfeld in Teistungen, Thuringia, is a popular tourist attraction close to Leinefelde-Worbis.

The Borderland Museum Eichsfeld, a Cold War history museum located only a few miles away from Leinefelde-Worbis, presents different topics of the history of the German division and the GDR on an area of 1,000 squaremetres. The exhibition is displayed in both German and English.

== People ==
Leinefelde is the birthplace of Johann Carl Fuhlrott, the discoverer of Neanderthal man. It is also the birthplace of Johannes Krause, who determined the Denisovan are a distinct line of Homo distinct from modern humans and Neanderthals. Fuhlrott and Krause, born nearly 180 years apart, were also professors at the University of Tübingen.

Worbis is the birthplace of Bernard Quaritch (1819-1899), the London second-hand bookseller and publisher, and of Barbara Saß-Viehweger (born 1943), a German politician, lawyer and civil law notary.
