= Malsfeld =

- Municipality
- Coat of arms

- Location of Malsfeld within Schwalm-Eder-Kreis district
- Interactive map of Malsfeld
- Location within Germany Location within Hesse
- Coordinates: 51°05′N 09°32′E
- Country: Germany
- State: Hesse
- Admin. region: Kassel
- District: Schwalm-Eder-Kreis

Government
  - Mayor (2021–27): Michael Hanke (SPD)

Area
  - Total: 34.49 km^{2} (13.32 sq mi)
- Elevation: 192 m (630 ft)

Population (2025-12-31)
  - Total: 3,705
  - Density: 107.4/km^{2} (278.2/sq mi)
- Time zone: UTC+01:00 (CET)
  - Summer (DST): UTC+02:00 (CEST)
- Postal codes: 34323
- Dialling codes: 05661
- Vehicle registration: HR
- Website: www.malsfeld.de

Malsfeld is a municipality in the Schwalm-Eder district in Hesse, Germany, on the river Fulda.

The community consists of the centres of Beiseförth, Dagobertshausen, Elfershausen, Mosheim, Malsfeld, Ostheim and Sipperhausen.

The community was once a railway hub on the Kassel–Bebra and Treysa–Eschwege lines. It has an interchange on the Autobahn A 7.

== Constituent communities ==
=== Beiseförth ===
Although it had its first documentary mention in 1348 as "Beysenvorte", the community is believed to date back to the 8th century. In 1603, "Beysenfort" became a fief of Philip von Scholley.

Until about 1870, shipping on the river Fulda with Kassel und Hersfeld was as important a source of income as linen weaving and later basketry.

Among the sights to see are the Schiffhaus ("Ship House") where the Beise empties into the Fulda, and the Korbmachermuseum ("Basket Maker's Museum").

=== Dagobertshausen ===
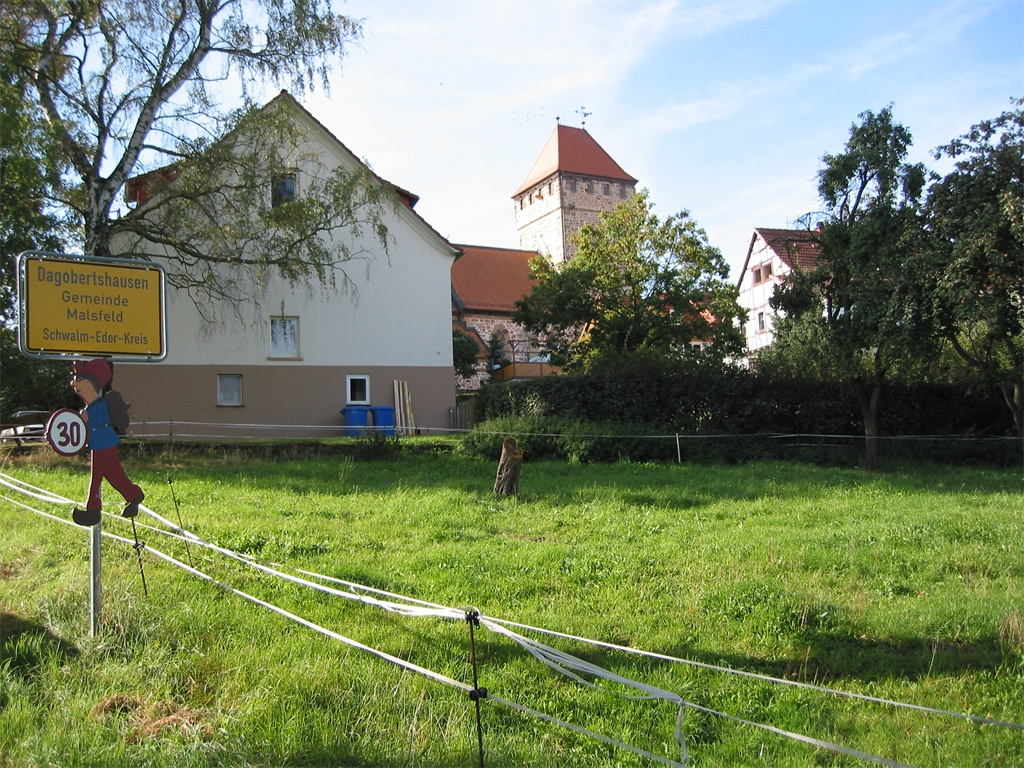
The way into Dagobertshausen, "fortress church" in the background

A legend holds that the name Dagobertshausen comes from Frankish King Dagobert I, who beat the Wends here in 631. Officially, though, the name has only been used since 1747, until which time the village had been known as "Dabelshusen", "Dageboldishus" or "Taboldshusen".

Dagobert I is also said to have endowed a church, on whose site now stands the "fortress church", built in the 12th or 13th century.

=== Elfershausen ===
Elfershausen had its first documentary mention in 1253 when the whole village was donated to the Breitenau monastery by the Count of Felsberg. After the Reformation, the village passed into the Landgraves' ownership. Beginning in 1770, the "Domäne Elfershausen" even included parts of Dagobertshausen; it was finally dissolved only in 1971 when it was amalgamated with Malsfeld in what would turn out to be the beginning of the later "Greater Community of Malsfeld", which was formed as part of municipal reforms.

The Sälzerweg, a commercial road between Leipzig and Frankfurt runs north of Elfershausen. Elfershausen's inhabitants worked mainly in agriculture at one time.

=== Mosheim ===
The first mention of Mosheim (as "Mazheim") can be found in the Breviarium Lulli between 775 and 786. In the Codex Eberhardi, Mosheim is mentioned as a donation to the Fulda monastery (between 802 and 817). Over time, the village's name has varied somewhat (1266 Masheim, 1376 Moßheym, 1428 Maßheim, 1597 Maaßheimb, 1600 Mosheimb). In 1324, Mosheim came under Hessian overlordship under Konrad von Hebel. Between 1219 and 1450, Mosheim had a local noble family. In 1194, Mosheim's church was mentioned as a chapel. A small church built about 1500 was partly destroyed in the Thirty Years' War, expanded in 1752, and remodelled in 1969

=== Ostheim ===
Ostheim had its first documentary mention between 1145 and 1159. Basalt was once quarried here, and brown coal was also mined.

=== Sipperhausen ===
Sipperhausen lies between Homberg and Melsungen. It had its first documentary mention in 943 as the abandoned village of "Swidburg", and then in 1142 as "Swipergehusen". The community also includes the settlement of Bubenrode, from 1377 a knight's manor of the Malsburg noble family.

== Sightseeing ==
- Korbmachermuseum ("Basket Maker's Museum") in Beiseförth

== Specialities ==
- Malsfeld beer
- Meat and sausage products from Dagobertshausen.

== Partnerships ==
Malsfeld maintains partnerships with the following places:

- Bag, Hungary since 1996
- Moyaux, France since 1984
- (Germany) Unterschönau, Thuringia since 1990
