= Verkehrsverbund Mittelthüringen =

Verkehrsverbund Mittelthüringen (VMT)
- Company type: GmbH
- Industry: Public transport
- Founded: 2006; 20 years ago
- Headquarters: Erfurt, Germany
- Area served: Central Thuringia

Voll-Mobil-Ticket

The Verkehrsverbund Mittelthüringen (VMT) is a transport association in central Thuringia, Germany. It comprises the cities of Erfurt, Weimar, Jena, and Gera, as well as parts of the districts of Weimarer Land, Sömmerda, Gotha, Ilm-Kreis, Saale-Holzland-Kreis, and Burgenlandkreis.

The VMT is supported by the Verkehrsgemeinschaft Mittelthüringen GmbH (VMT GmbH). As part of this transport association, the Verbundtarif Mittelthüringen (short for VMT or Voll-Mobil-Ticket) was introduced, which applies to trains and trams as well as various bus routes in the independent cities of Erfurt, Weimar, Jena and Gera and in the district of Weimarer Land with the city of Apolda. The tariff merger was mainly due to the high number of passengers and commuters between the four cities.

== History ==
The tariff came into force on April 1, 2006, replacing the RegioMobil tariff, which was a predecessor of Deutsche Bahn. The price of the tickets depends on the tariff zones to be crossed. With the ticket, trains of DB Regio, Abellio Rail Mitteldeutschland, Süd-Thüringen-Bahn and Erfurter Bahn, the regional public transport in the cities as well as the intercity bus services of the municipal and private transport companies in the network area can be used.

When the timetable was changed in February 2009, validators were introduced at the stations in the tariff area, so that the rule that all tickets had already been validated, which some customers found impractical, no longer applied.

On 12 December 2010, the VMT was extended to include the Saale-Holzland-Kreis, the remaining parts of the Weimarer Land district, the Gotha district and the city of Gera. In addition, the railway lines to Bad Langensalza as well as individual bus lines to Sömmerda, Zeitz, Neustadt an der Orla, Rudolstadt, Oberhof, Schmalkalden and Eisenach are included in the integrated tariff.

== Fare zones ==
Verkehrsverbund Mittelthüringen is divided into 106 tariff zones. There are four city tariff zones: Erfurt (10), Weimar (20), Jena (30), Gera (40) and 102 regional tariff zones.

=== Railway lines ===
The following railway lines are complete or sectional in the tariff area:

- Halle–Bebra railway (Großheringen–Apolda–Weimar–Erfurt–Gotha–Mechterstädt)
- Weimar–Gera railway (Weimar–Jena–Gera)
- Großheringen–Saalfeld railway/Orla Railway (Großheringen–Jena–Orlamünde–Freienorla)
- Leipzig–Probstzella railway (Crossen Ort–Gera-Zwötzen)
- Straußfurt–Großheringen railway (Buttstädt–Großheringen)
- Ilm Valley Railway
- Sangerhausen–Erfurt railway (Erfurt–Stotternheim)
- Wolkramshausen–Erfurt railway (Erfurt–Ringleben-Gebesee)
- Bad Langensalza–Kühnhausen railway
- Gotha–Leinefelde railway (Gotha–Bad Langensalza)
- Friedrichroda Railway

== Transport companies ==
=== Railway companies ===
- Abellio Rail Mitteldeutschland
- DB Regio
- Erfurter Bahn
- Süd-Thüringen-Bahn

=== Tram and bus ===
- Erfurter Verkehrsbetriebe (SWE EVAG)
- Stadtwirtschaft Weimar (SWG)
- Jenaer Nahverkehrsgesellschaft (JeNah)
- Personenverkehrsgesellschaft Weimarer Land (PVG), Apolda
- JES Verkehrsgesellschaft in Saale-Holzland-Kreis and Jena
- Geraer Verkehrsbetrieb
- Thüringerwaldbahn und Straßenbahn Gotha GmbH
- Verkehrsunternehmen Andreas Schröder
- Regionale Verkehrsgemeinschaft Gotha (RVG)

== Statistics ==
- Inhabitants in the tariff area (Erfurt, Weimar, Weimarer Land, Jena)
  - 2005: 451 058
  - 2007: 457 032
  - 2011: 1 163 844
- Persons transported per year (estimate)
  - 2005 and 2007: 48 000 000
- Passenger-kilometres per year (estimate)
  - 2005 and 2007: 300 000 000 (average 6.25 km/person/trip)
- Railway stations, stopping points, stops
  - 2005: 871
  - 2007: 811
- Vehicles
  - 2005: 519
  - 2007: 500
- Lines
  - 2005 and 2007: 104, including 12 railway lines, 13 tram lines, 43 city lines, 36 intercity bus lines
- Integrated transport companies
  - 2005 and 2007: 8
  - 2011: 13

== Criticism ==
=== General criticism ===
Criticism has been levelled at both the tariffs, which are perceived as not being in line with demand, as well as the obligation to apply the association tariff, which prevents consumer-friendly choices. The majority of rail traffic in the tariff area takes place on the Erfurt-Weimar-Jena axis. Here, in turn, the proportion of only rail drivers is very high. Since the introduction of the integrated tariff, this customer group has been confronted with sometimes drastic price increases without making use of a corresponding service. In the rest of the integrated area beyond the main axis, which is characterized by a strong regional breakdown, the local transport offer often does not represent an alternative to individual transport, so that the positive aspects of an integrated tariff cannot unfold in the desired way either. The criticism is supported by the Pro Bahn passenger association and is now also being expressed in initiatives by local transport users.

=== BahnCard-50 holder ===
The initial non-recognition of the BahnCard 25 and 50 led to price increases for holders of these cards. The price difference between regional trains and ICE trains on the Erfurt-Weimar route was only 0.85 euros for a BahnCard 50 customer. This led to unwanted use of the ICE between Erfurt and Weimar by local transport customers.

A 25% BahnCard discount was therefore introduced on 1 January 2008. This is granted to holders of the BahnCard 25 or BahnCard 50 when travelling through at least two tariff zones. The BahnCard 100 is recognised as an annual ticket on trains and in city traffic in Erfurt, Weimar, Jena and Gera. A 25% discount applies to all BahnCards on regional bus services.

For BahnCard-50 holders, a curiosity may arise in the case of pure train journeys that longer journeys or long-distance journeys that break away from the network are cheaper than journeys at the network tariff. There are two reasons for this. The group tariff includes possible bus and tram journeys and the transport companies participating in the group receive only a small compensation for the recognition of the BahnCards.
