= Halle–Hann. Münden railway =

Railway line in Germany

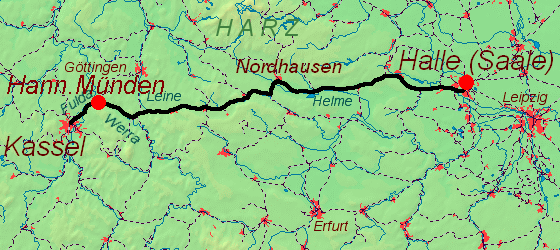

Overview
- Line number: 6343
- Locale: Saxony-Anhalt, Thuringia, Lower Saxony and Hesse
- Termini: Halle (Saale) Hbf; Hann. Münden

Service
- Route number: 590, 600 and 611

Technical
- Line length: 218 km (135 mi)
- Track gauge: 1,435 mm (4 ft 8 1/2 in) standard gauge
- Electrification: 15 kV/16.7 Hz AC catenary

The Halle–Hann. Münden railway (also known along with a portion of the Hanoverian Southern Railway as the Halle-Kasseler Eisenbahn—Halle-Kassel railway) is a 218 km long main line operated by the Deutsche Bahn in Germany, which links Halle (Saale) in Saxony-Anhalt with Hann. Münden in the state of Lower Saxony. It is mainly used by regional and east-west goods trains. From 1990 to 1994 it was upgraded as part of a German Unification Transport Project.

== Route ==
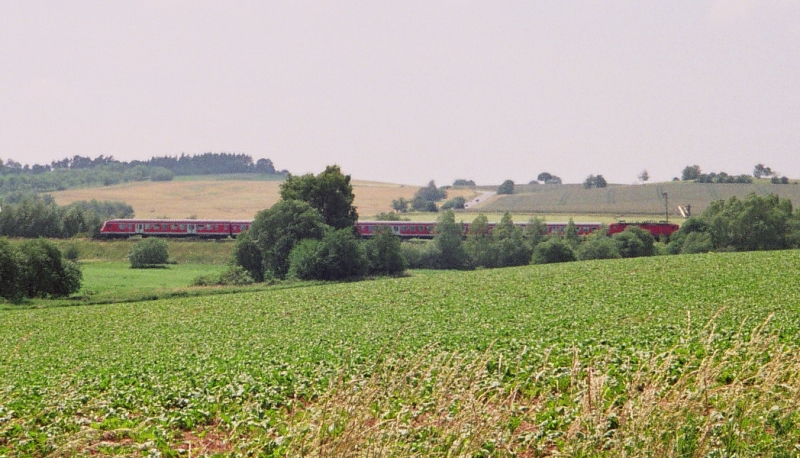
In the summer of 2007, a Regionalexpress service crosses the former Inner German Border which ran along the stream in the foreground.

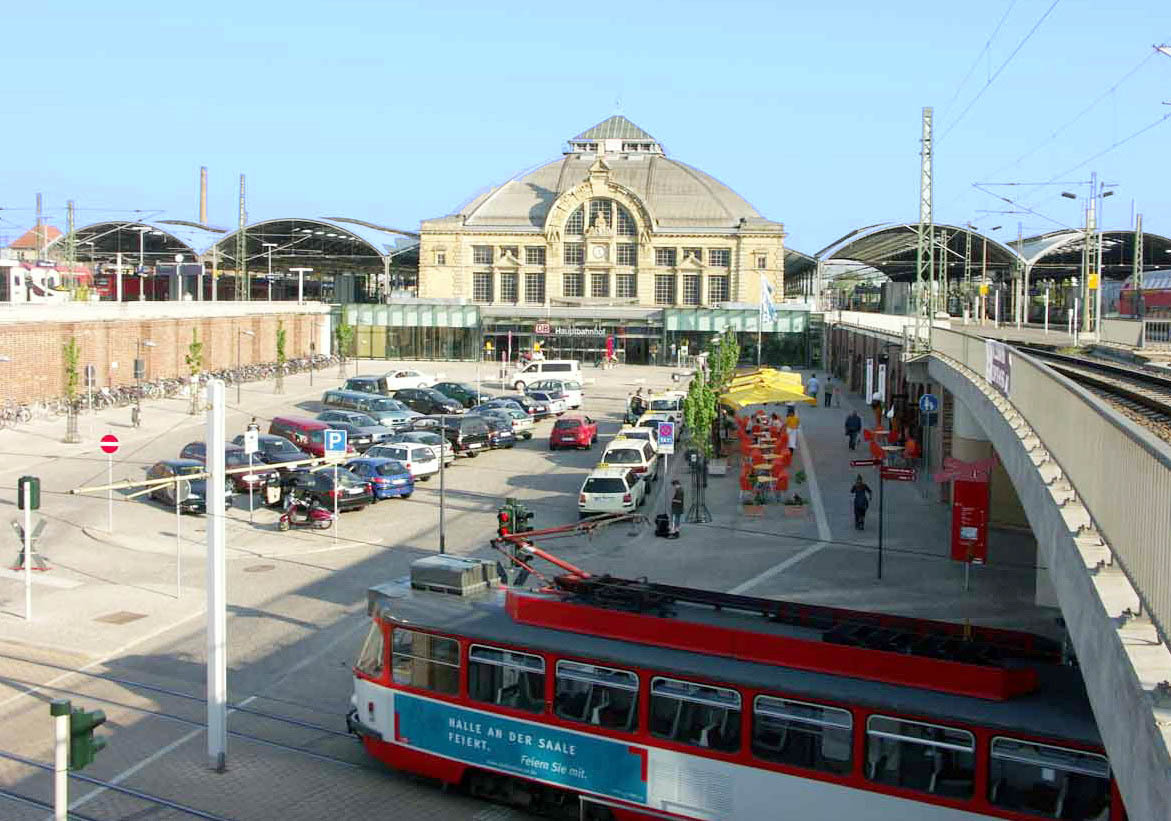
Halle Hauptbahnhof; trains between Sangerhausen and Kassel run on the west side (right).

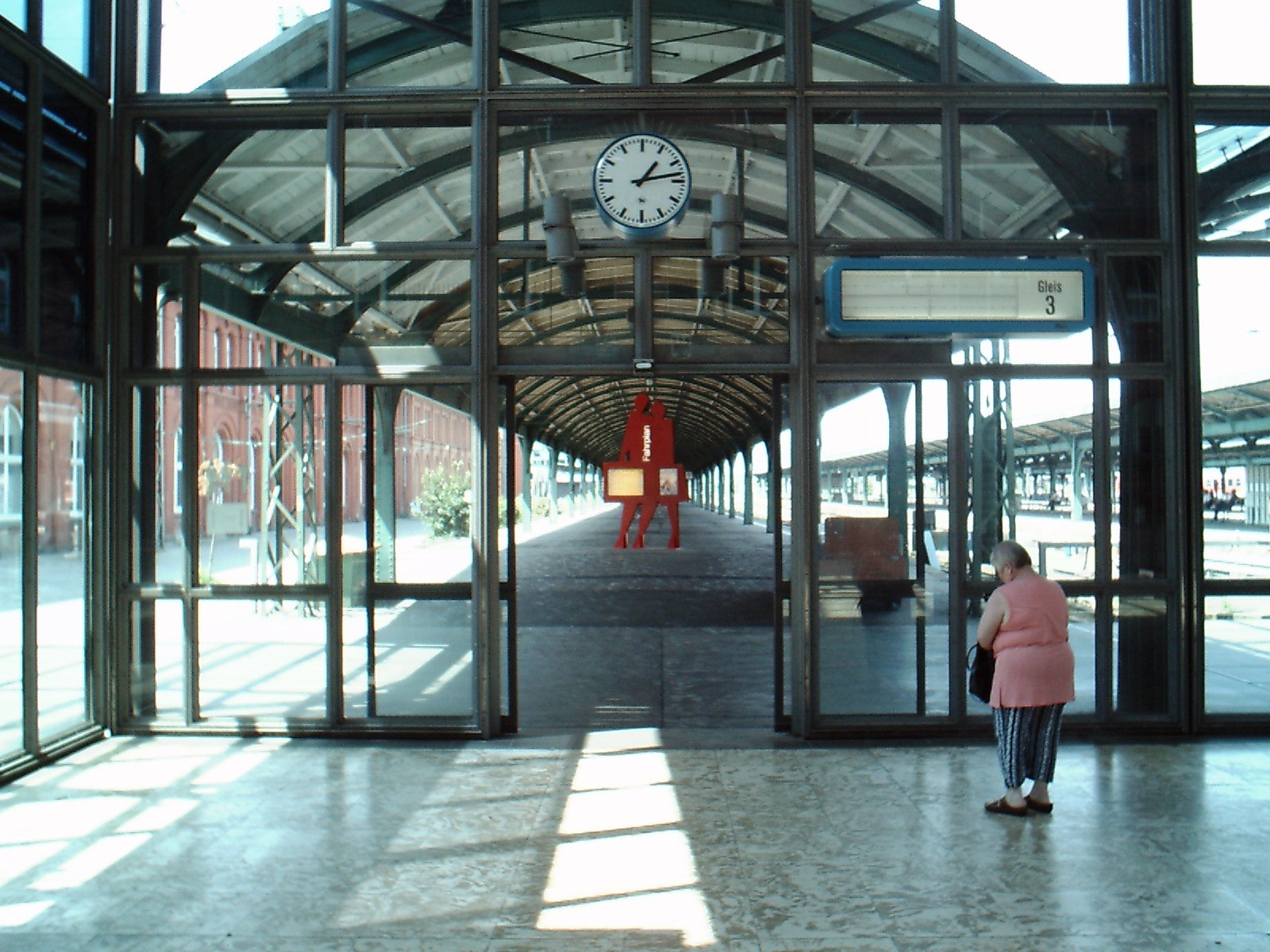
Kassel Hbf – view of the platform; the trains to and from Eichenberg generally run on the north side (tracks 7 to 13).

The railway line climbs out of Halle to Lutherstadt Eisleben in the Mansfelder Land. Near Blankenheim it passes through the only tunnel on the route. From there the railway descends again until it reaches the Goldene Aue near Sangerhausen, a plain between the Harz mountains and the Kyffhäuser hills. At the western end of the hill range the railway reaches the Thuringian town of Nordhausen. From here it climbs again, grazes Bleicherode, and crosses the Eichsfeld passing through Leinefelde and Heilbad Heiligenstadt. Near Eichenberg it switches from the valley of the Leine to that of the river Werra and follows it as far as Hann. Münden in Lower Saxony. From here it runs along the Fulda to Kassel. The main station is a terminus with its approach from the west; as a result the line has to loop around the northern part of the city.

The line is very winding. From Witzenhausen Nord to Kassel Hauptbahnhof it is almost 42 km long whereas the distance as the crow flies is just 26 km. Until electrification goods trains were pushed up the inclines on both sides of the Blankenheim Tunnels (on the Blankenheimer Ramp or Riestedt Ramp). For that purpose locomotives were stabled in the Bahnbetriebswerk at Röblingen am See for 120 years.

== History ==
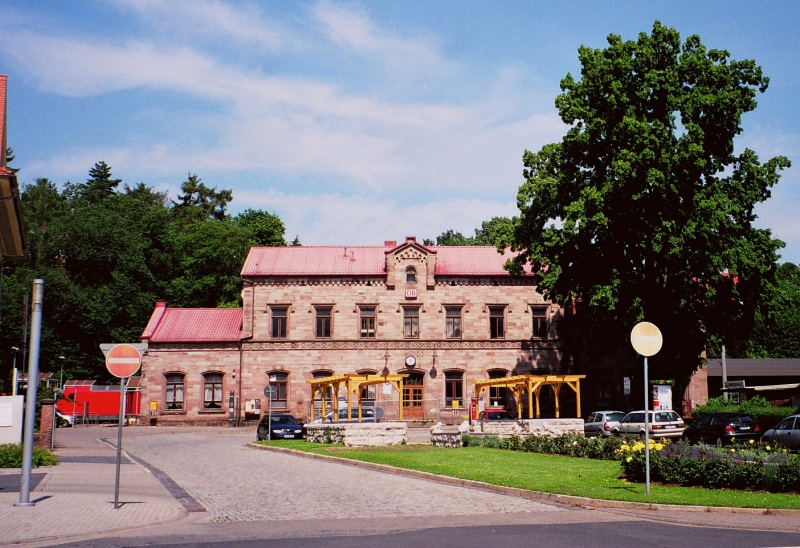
Heiligenstadt station

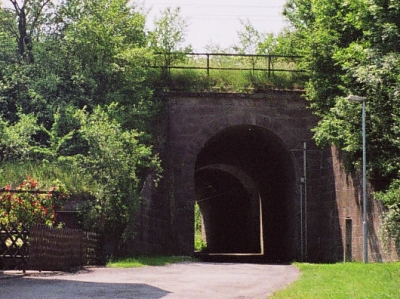
Near Arenshausen a dirt road runs under two lines. In front is the line that ran between 1867 and 1884 to Friedland, behind is the line opened in 1872 to Eichenberg

=== Planning and opening ===
Already during the planning of the Thuringian Railway in 1838, a route via Nordhausen was discussed, but it was dropped in favour of the route via Erfurt. Despite considerable pressure from the region, no progress was made until an agreement was reached in 1862 between the Prussian government and the Magdeburg-Leipzig Railway Company (Magdeburg-Leipziger Eisenbahn-Gesellschaft), providing for the construction of a line from Halle to Heiligenstadt.

While Kassel was the goal, the continuation of the line remained controversial, especially the best route through the Werra and Fulda valleys running through the Kingdom of Hanover. Prussia was interested in a direct connection to Kassel, which did not rely on the Thuringian Railway Company.

In January 1863, a concession was formally granted and shortly afterwards construction began. On 1 September 1865 the line was opened from Halle via Eisleben to Sangerhausen and it was extended to Nordhausen on 10 July 1866 and via Leinefelde and Heiligenstadt to Arenshausen on 9 July 1867. After the annexation of Hanover as a result of the War of 1866, Prussia instructed the railway company to build a route via Großalmerode, Helsa and Kaufungen through the Kaufungen Forest to give access to its glass factories and mines. That would have required a costly and steep route.

The railway company resisted and originally built only a connection via Friedland to Göttingen (opened on 1 August 1867), connecting to the Hanoverian Southern Railway, which provided a connection to Kassel, all other work was delayed.

In 1869, the railway company opened a connection from Arenshausen via Eichenberg, Witzenhausen Nord (above the city and on the other side of the Werra) and Hedemünden to Hann. Münden. The Hanoverian Southern Railway was rebuilt from there to Kassel with two tracks. This work was completed on 13 March 1872.

=== Development up to 1945 ===
Traffic grew rapidly. After a few years, several connecting lines were opened. In 1869, the South Harz Railway opened between Nordhausen and Northeim and the Nordhausen-Erfurt Railway opened between Wolkramshausen and Erfurt. In 1870, the Gotha–Leinefelde railway opened. In 1876, the Bebra–Göttingen line (later part of the North–South railway) was completed from Friedland to Eschwege and Bebra, crossing in Eichenberg.

On 1 June 1876, the line was nationalised, as part of the line was included in the project to build a line from Berlin to Metz, the Cannons Railway (Kanonenbahn). This strategic railway used the Halle-Kassel line between Blankenheim and Leinefelde. On 15 April 1879, the Berlin-Blankenheim railway was opened from Berlin-Grunewald via Güsten (which was connected to Magdeburg via the Schönebeck–Güsten railway) to a junction east of the Blankenheim Tunnel. In 1879, this was supplemented by a link from Sangerhausen and Erfurt. From Leinefelde the Cannons Railway used the line towards Gotha. The development of the Halle–Kassel line was motivated not only by militarily considerations but also as a means of putting pressure on the Thuringian Railway, leading to its nationalisation between 1882 and 1886.

In 1884, the Arenshausen-Friedland link (which had been superseded by the Bebra–Göttingen line connection at Eichenberg) was abandoned.

Together, the South Harz, the Solling and the Altenbeken–Kreiensen lines created a major east-west freight route between Nordhausen and Halle. As a result, a little less traffic ran from Magdeburg and Halle via Nordhausen and Kassel to Frankfurt. Passenger services for example on the Leinefelde–Eichenberg section in the summer of 1939 consisted on weekdays of four pairs of express trains, five pairs of semi-fast (Eilzug) trains and ten pairs of stopping trains.

Near the southern Harz, the Mittelbau-Dora concentration camp was established to the northwest of Nordhausen in 1943; it was attached to vast underground weapons factories. To remove through traffic from this area, construction was begun on a connecting line from the South Harz line near Osterhagen to the Halle–Kassel line between Nordhausen and Werther. The construction of this Helme Valley Railway (Helmetalbahn) cost the life of several hundred forced labourers. It was never completed and its route was disrupted in 1945 by the inner German border. Remnants of its embankments and bridges are still visible today.

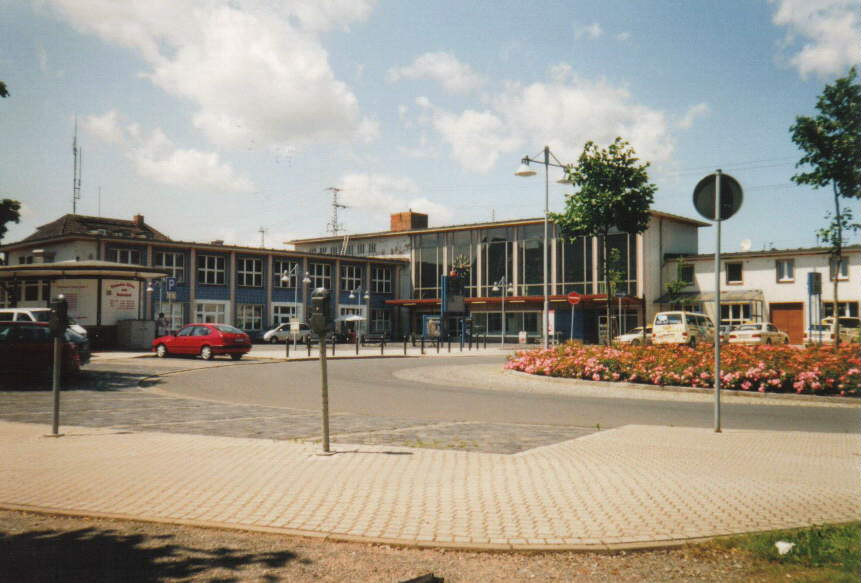
Sangerhausen station, rebuilt cheaply in 1964 after being damaged in the Second World War

In the last years of the war the line was overloaded with armaments and military traffic, but also with trains carrying prisoners. Maintenance was largely abandoned. In the air raid on Kassel on 22 October 1943, the central station was destroyed. Halle (Saale) Hauptbahnhof was severely damaged on 31 March 1945. German troops blew up the Fulda and Werra bridges in early April during their retreat. On 7 April, an ammunition train exploded in Sangerhausen station. Ten days later the entire area of the line was occupied by the Americans.

Later in May, traffic resumed on sections of the line.

=== Separation 1945 ===
With the division of Germany into occupation zones the railway was interrupted between Arenshausen and Eichenberg. The last train crossed the future border on 24 July 1945, when U.S. troops handed Thuringia over to the Red Army.

In subsequent years, released prisoners of war and "displaced persons" took the train to Arenshausen, from where they had to walk to the local border transit camp at Friedland. By 1952 there were repeated efforts to reopen the line. Instead, the border became increasingly hard to cross. From 1952 Arenshausen station was in the "exclusion zone", trains ran through it, but it could only be used with special permission. The tracks between Arenshausen and Eichenberg had been dismantled.

=== Reconstruction and further development in the East Germany ===
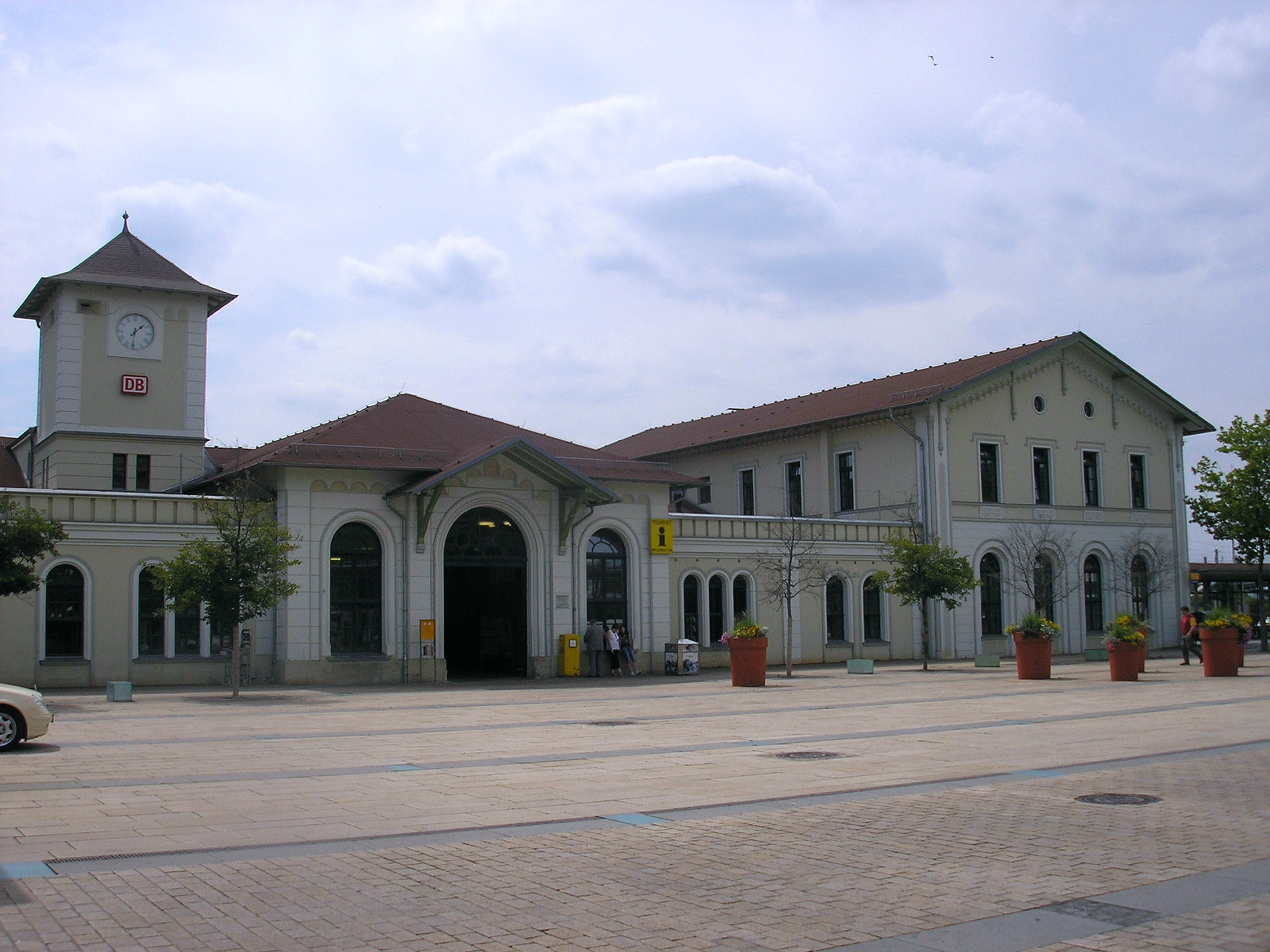
Nordhausen station

Until 1947, the second track was largely dismantled for reparations to the Soviet Union, but it was largely restored from Halle to Sangerhausen by 1954. In 1965, the line near Berga-Kelbra was relocated for the new Kelbra Dam on the Helme.

Potash mining and the newly formed cement industry in Deuna led to the duplication of the line at Sollstedt in 1979. Freight transport grew more intense. In 1986, it was decided to electrify the line from Halle to Leinefelde. This began in January 1989 and was completed in 1993.

=== Reconstruction and further development in West Germany ===
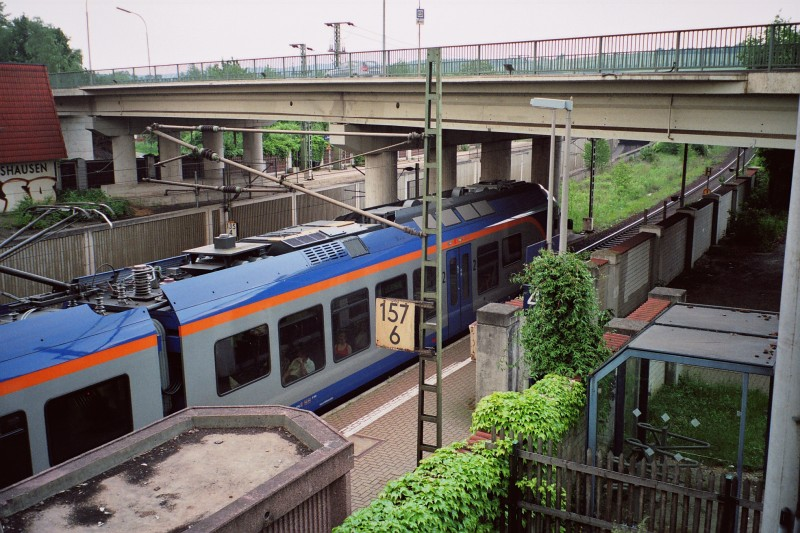
Fuldatal-Ihringshausen station with Cantus EMUs. The station was closed with the opening of the high-speed line, but it was later reopened.

The bridges over the Fulda near Ihringshausen and the Werra near Hedemünden were destroyed, but a single track was already back in operation in August 1945; two tracks were restored in 1949.

The line has been electrified since 25 September 1964. At the same time, Eichenberg station was rebuilt and the exit towards Halle was temporarily closed.

Until the opening of the Hanover–Würzburg high-speed railway, the western section of the Halle-Kassel line was served by shuttle trains running between Kassel and an interchange at Göttingen station, while intercity services trains took the direct route from Bebra to Göttingen, bypassing Kassel.

In connection with the building of high-speed line, there were plans for the Eichenberg–Kassel line to be reduced to a single track.

During the construction of high-speed line, the Halle–Kassel railway was relocated in the Fuldatal-Ihringshausen and Vellmar area. The community of Fuldatal ultimately succeeded after years of litigation with Deutsche Bundesbahn in having their station re-opened.

=== German Unity Transport Project ===
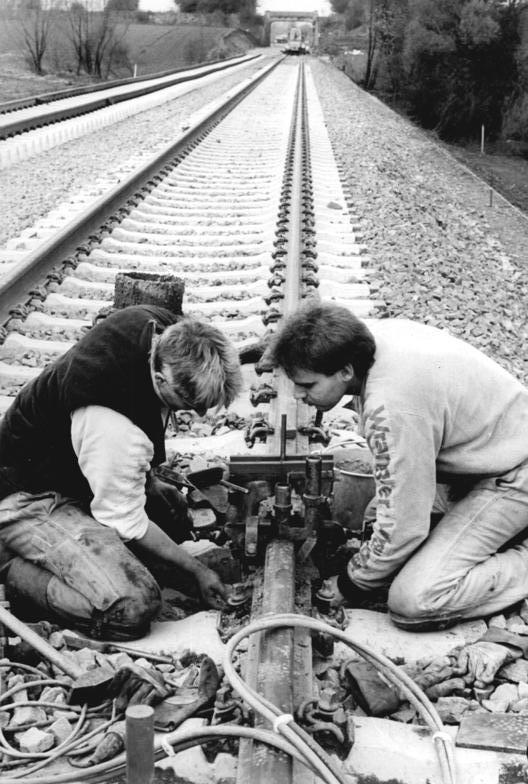
Reconstruction of the Arenshausen–Eichenberg section in April 1990

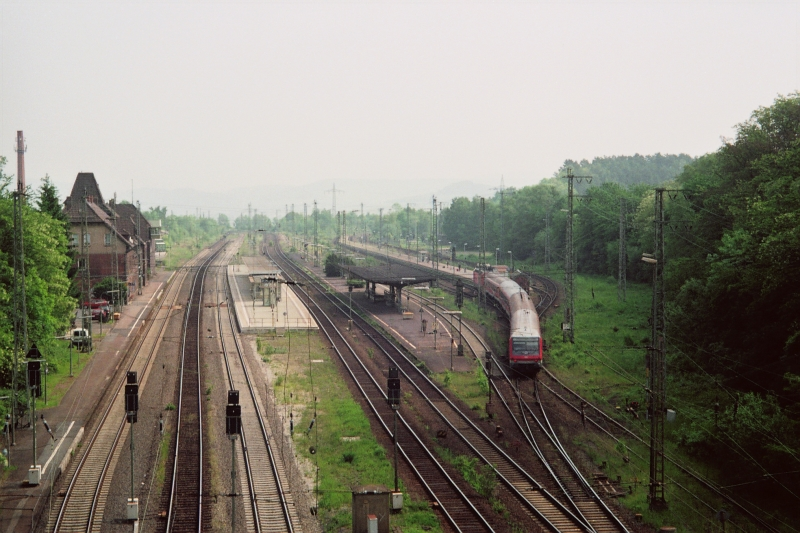
Eichenberg station with Regional-Express to Halle (2007). Only the three tracks to the right run to the east.

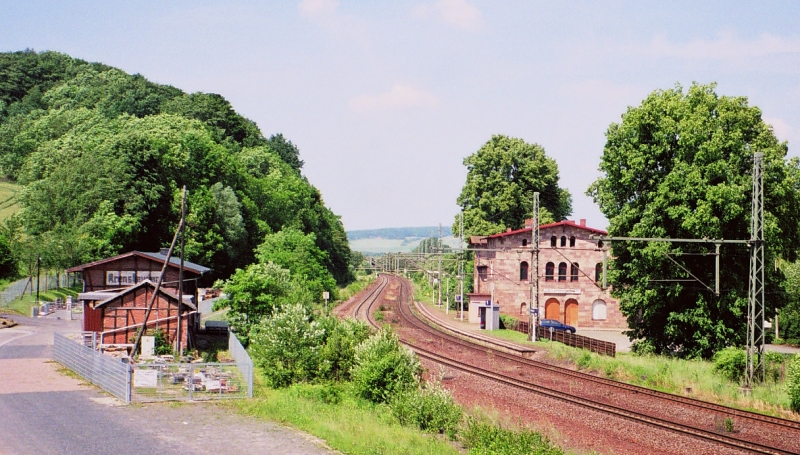
Arenshausen station has been downgraded to a halt, the platform serving trains to Heiligenstadt is further east. During the division of Germany there was a much longer platform between the tracks for border controls.

In 1989, it was decided to reopen the Arenshausen–Eichenberg section. Construction began as soon as January 1990. This included the upgrading of both stations with platforms for long trains (476 m in Eichenberg).

During the reconstruction of the railway track there was the oddity that the Eastern and Western railway companies, both restored their respective right track first, which failed to meet at the border. On the eastern side the second track was restored a few weeks later. The infrastructure was consistently in place on 3 May 1990, trains were able to run on 26 May and on 30 June passport and customs controls were established.

In Eichenberg the platform of the line to Halle was rebuilt east of the existing track field. The single-track connection on the southwest exit was re-opened as an at-grade connection. This clearly limits the performance of the line. Traffic to Kassel from the North-South line runs over a grade-separated route, while traffic from Leinefelde to Kassel either has to run on the left or has to cross the complete track field.

In 1991, the German Unity transport projects (Verkehrsprojekte Deutsche Einheit) were approved. These included the upgrading of the Eichenberg–Halle line. €268 million was spent up to 1994 on the duplication of the line, its upgrading and electrification. The electrification between Halle and Bernterode West junction was part of a project started by the East German railways in January 1989, which was completed and continued to Eichenberg.

In parallel, the South Harz Autobahn was built for €1.4 billion, crossing the railway line five times between Bleicherode and Wallhausen.

In 1998, a connection curve was opened to the northeast of Eichenberg, allowing trains to run directly between Erfurt/Halle and Göttingen.

An InterRegio service on the Halle–Kassel–Frankfurt route that was introduced in 1993 only lasted two years, as the Hamburg–Konstanz IR service took over the route over the high-speed line.

In 2003 Interconnex (a subsidiary of Veolia Verkehr) operated a service on the Rostock–Berlin–Halle–Kassel–Cologne and Neuss route, but only for a few months. Since then, only freight and regional passenger trains have operated regularly on the line.

At the timetable change on 9 December 2007, Gernrode station was formally renamed Gernrode-Niederorschel station.

=== Further Plans ===
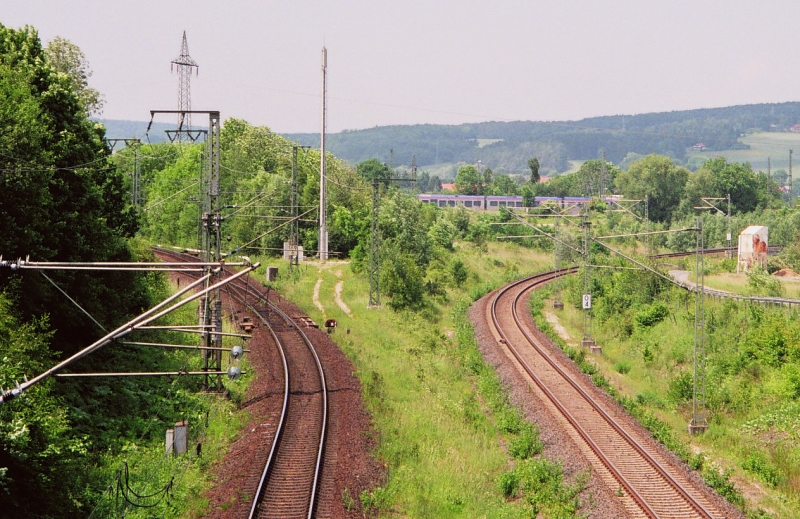
Rail triangle near Eichenberg: trains from Halle–Arenshausen run on the right to Friedland–Göttingen and on the left to Eichenberg–Kassel. In the background there is a Cantus EMU from Göttingen to Fulda.

In the next few years, no further upgrades are to be expected, but the line will gradually be fitted with electronic interlockings. The line has still not been fitted with the Linienzugbeeinflussung train protection system. In addition, east of Leinefelde, especially between Sangerhausen and Angersdorf, significant reconstruction is necessary and trains currently often have to slow down to 50 km/h. In the public transport plan of Saxony-Anhalt, an upgrade of this line to 140 km/h is required and the state hopes to improve facilities for freight traffic.

In the "other requirements" section of the Federal Transport Infrastructure Plan (Bundesverkehrswegeplan), a connection would be provided from the line at Speel to Espenau-Mönchehof on the Kassel–Warburg line, connecting to the Ruhr, in order to save freight trains a reversal in Kassel.

There are regular requests for the reconstruction of Eichenberg station in the layout it had up to 1954.

== Current operations ==
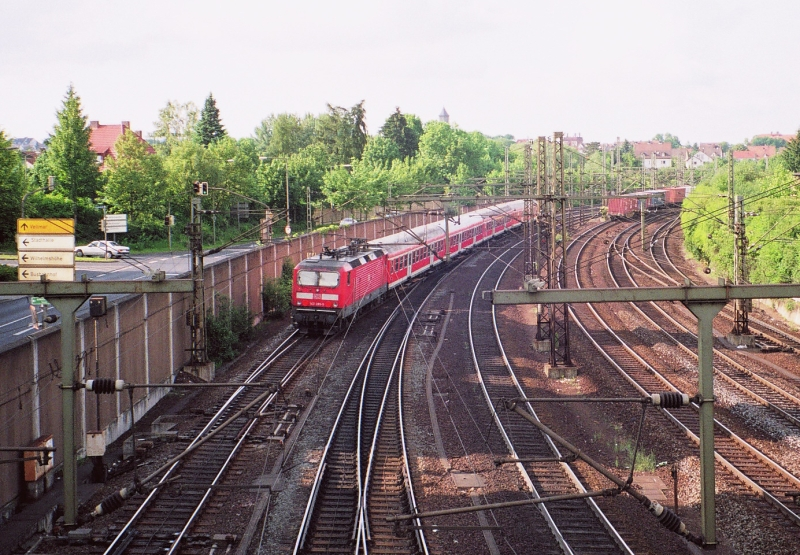
Regional-Express to Halle leaves Kassel-Wilhelmshöhe, running on the high-speed line (left) as far as Ihringshausen.

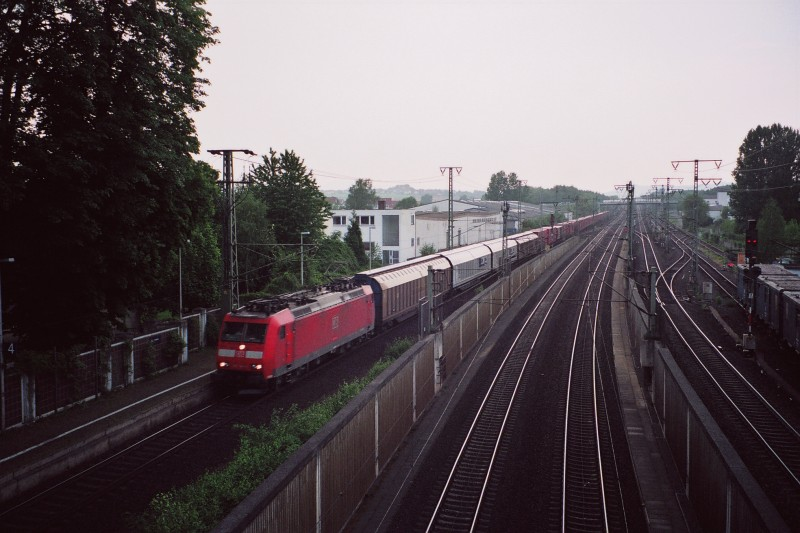
Ihringshausen station and junction with freight train towards Eichenberg. The outer tracks are the Halle-Kassel line, the inner tracks are the Hanover–Würzburg high-speed line

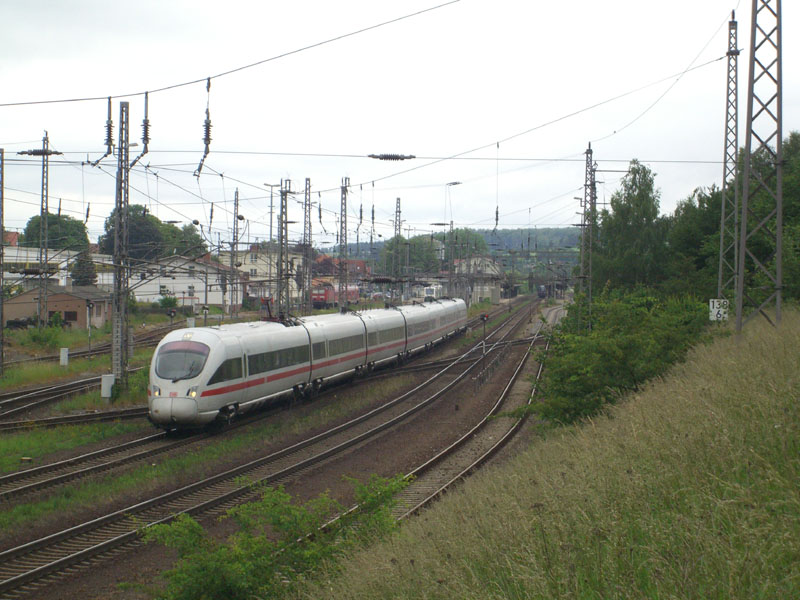
Diverted ICE to Dresden leaving Leinefelde

=== Passengers ===
The entire line is served by a Kassel–Halle Regional-Express every two hours; all other services only use sections of the route. The Göttingen–Heiligenstadt-Gotha-Erfurt–Gera–Chemnitz, Nordhausen–Erfurt and Magdeburg–Erfurt Regional-Express services also run every two hours, as does the Kassel–Heiligenstadt–Erfurt service of the Erfurter Bahn. Since the timetable change on 13 December 2009, the Intercity service, Kyffhäuser, runs on Friday from Frankfurt via Halle to Leipzig, returning on Sunday.

These services are supplemented by Regionalbahn services, consisting of class 143 locomotives with double-deck carriages. In Halle the line to Kassel runs next to the tracks of the S-Bahn; they use the same tracks on the bridge over the Saale. The Halle–Nordhausen line is operated by an hourly Regionalbahn service, called the Kupfer-Express (copper express) in commemoration of the region’s mining tradition. The Nordhausen–Leinefelde Regionalbahn service runs approximately every hour; these services run every two hours to Heiligenstadt, so that with the railcars of the Erfurter Bahn there is an approximately hourly service. From Heiligenstadt to Eichenberg there are only the Regional-Express service and the Erfurter Bahn service. The Eichenberg–Kassel section is served by electric multiple units on the Kassel–Göttingen route. This service, along with the Regional-Express service, run to Kassel Hauptbahnhof, all other services run to Kassel-Wilhelmshöhe station.

Services between Kassel and Göttingen are operated by Cantus Verkehrsgesellschaft.

=== Freight ===
The entire line is a busy line for freight. Thus, the division of labour that prevailed before 1945 has been restored on the main routes between the Harz and the Thuringian Forest: freight trains run via Sangerhausen and Nordhausen, while fast passenger services run via Bebra and Erfurt (the Thuringian Railway). Further growth is affected by the poor connections in Eichenberg and the need for traffic to and from the Ruhr to reverse in Kassel.

== Sources ==
- Paul Lauerwald (1993). Die Halle-Kasseler Eisenbahn (in German). Berlin: transpress Verlagsgesellschaft. ISBN 3-344-70788-4.
- Josef Högemann (1995). Eisenbahnen im Harz – Volume 1: Die Staatsbahnstrecken (in German). Nordhorn: Verlag Kenning. ISBN 3-927587-43-5.
- Wolfgang Koch; Werner Keller; Paul Lauerwald (1990). Bahnhof Eichenberg – Glanz, Fall and Wiederaufstieg eines Eisenbahn-Knotenpunktes (in German). Hessisch Lichtenau: Verlag Vogt. ISBN 3-9800576-6-6.
- Rudolf Wegner (1992). Verkehr and Verkehrswege im Raum Hann. Münden – die Entwicklung in den letzten 200 Jahren (in German). Hannoversch Münden: Heimat- and Geschichtsverein Sydekum zu Münden e. V. ISBN 3-925451-21-8.
- Paul Lauerwald (2010). "Vor 20 Jahren: Erster Lückenschluss im deutsch-deutschen Schienennetz nach 45-jähriger Teilung". Eichsfelder Heimatzeitschrift (in German) (54): 161–165. ISSN 1611-1648.
