= Gotha–Leinefelde railway =

Railway line in Germany

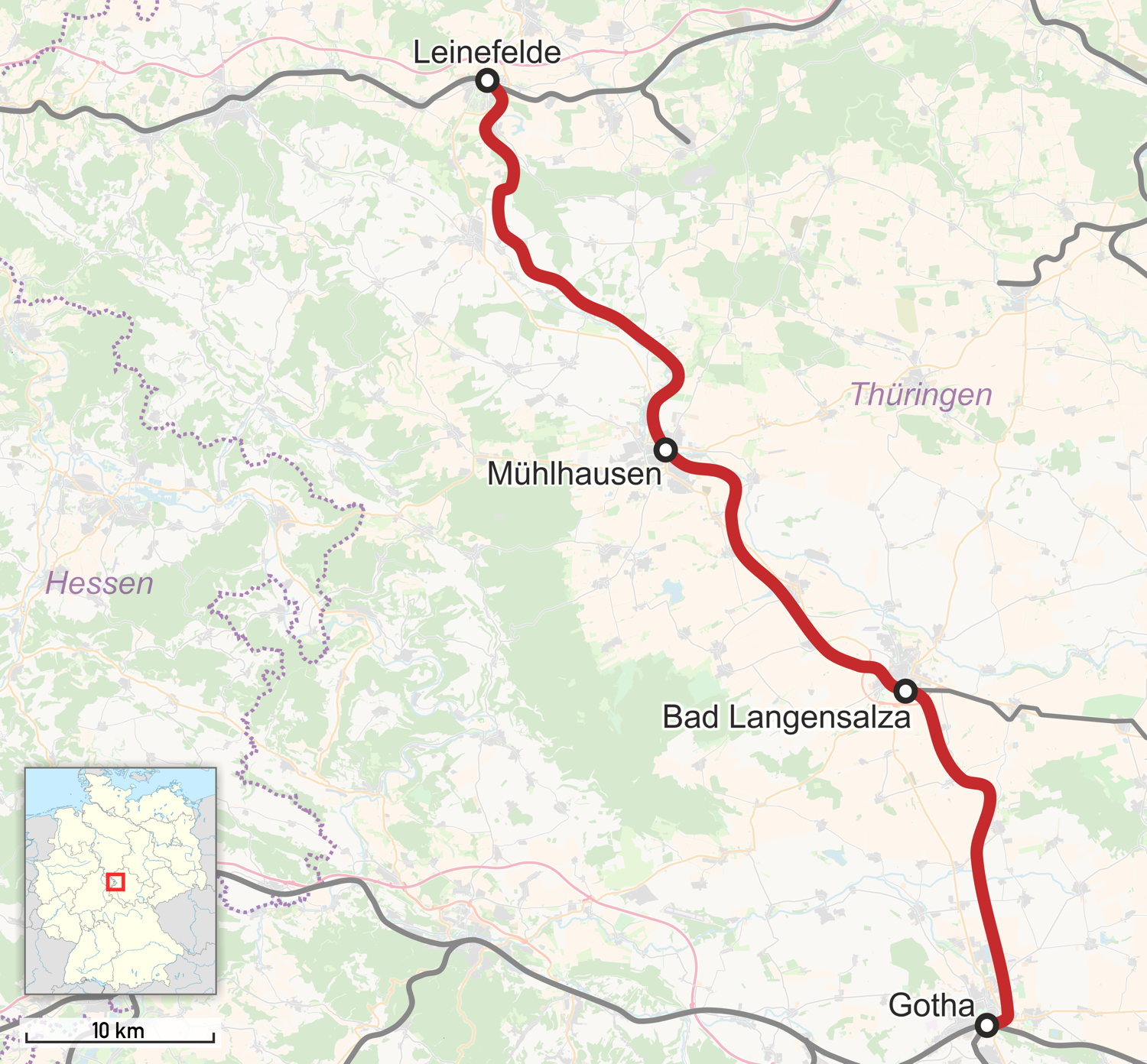
- Map of route

Overview
- Line number: 6296
- Locale: Thuringia, Germany

Service
- Route number: 604

Technical
- Line length: 67.1 km (41.7 mi)
- Track gauge: 1,435 mm (4 ft 8 1/2 in) standard gauge

The Gotha–Leinefelde railway connects Gotha and Leinefelde in the German state of Thuringia. It was opened in 1870 by the Thuringian Railway Company (German: Thüringische Eisenbahn-Gesellschaft). The line is about 67.1 km long. Regional-Express line 612 services operate every two hours on the line between Göttingen and Chemnitz and Zwickau. Erfurter Bahn operates services every two hours using Regio-Shuttle diesel multiple units. The running time is 40 minutes (Regional-Express) and 65 minutes (Erfurter Bahn) each way. It is thus part of the fastest connection from Jena, Weimar and Erfurt to Hanover.

== History ==
Already in the 1840s proposals for a railway from Frankfurt to Bavaria via Thuringia was under discussion. When construction of the Hanoverian Southern Railway (Hannöverschen Südbahn, Hanover–Göttingen–Kassel, opened in 1854) and the Werra Railway (Werrabahn, Eisenach–Meiningen–Coburg, opened in 1859) started, a connection was planned from these lines to Mühlhausen. From Göttingen to Leinefelde the line was shared with the temporary western end of the Halle–Kassel line (Nordhausen–Leinefelde–Arenshausen–Friedland–Göttingen, opened in 1867). However, the countries involved (Hanover, Prussia, Saxe-Weimar and Saxe-Coburg and Gotha) for a long time could not agree on an alignment, in particular the southern terminus (Eisenach, Gotha or Erfurt) was controversial. In the end, they agreed on Gotha, allowing construction to begin in 1868. In 1870, it was opened to traffic. The line connected with the existing line from the east (the Thuringian Railway, opened in 1847) in Gotha station in order to connect with the Werra Railway. This means that passengers still usually have to change trains in Gotha to reach Erfurt. The originally planned extension from Gotha to the south was never built.

However, progress has been made on other north–south routes. In 1876, part of the route later known as the North–South railway opened between Friedland and Bebra (the Bebra–Göttingen line), which is shorter and can accommodate higher loads (it has grades of up to 1:80 compared to over 1:50 for the Werra Railway). As early as 1884, the line between Arenshausen and Friedland was abandoned, so that trains from Gotha to Göttingen had to be change direction in Eichenberg.

In 1880 the Leinefelde–Silberhausen section of the line became part of the Cannons Railway (Kanonenbahn) and this section was duplicated. As a result of the Treaty of Versailles, the Leinefelde–Silberhausen section was reduced to one track in 1919/20.

By 1945 the railway the Leinefelde-Gotha line was mainly used for regional services with a few D-trains (D-Zügen, long-distance express trains) between Erfurt and Hanover. During the period of East Germany’s existence (1945–1990) there were no direct services between Erfurt and the Eichsfeld district.

Following German reunification the line between Arenshausen and Eichenberg was re-opened in 1990, with services operating to Kassel. Since the completion of the Eichenberg curve in 1998, services have run to Göttingen. From 1993 to 1997 direct services ran on the Gotha curve between Gotha Ost and Erfurt, bypassing Gotha station. The Gotha–Leinefelde line is now served by tilting trains operating at 160 km / h.
