= List of busiest railway stations in Germany =

This is a list of the busiest railway stations in Germany, with all stations being considered as major stations or hubs, and are also classified as either Category 1 or Category 2 stations.

An asterisk (*) indicates that the station only has rapid transit/commuter rail services.

Rank	Station	Annual entries/exits (millions)	Number of platforms	City	State	Image
1	Hamburg Hbf	196.0	12	Hamburg	Hamburg	
2	Frankfurt(Main)Hbf	179.9	29	Frankfurt am Main	Hesse	
3	München Hbf	150.7	34	Munich	Bavaria	
4	Berlin Hbf	120.1	14	Berlin	Berlin	
5	Köln Hbf	116.1	11	Cologne	North Rhine-Westphalia	
6	Berlin Friedrichstraße	95.6	8	Berlin	Berlin	
7	Hannover Hbf	95.3	12	Hannover	Lower Saxony	
8	Stuttgart Hbf	93.1	17	Stuttgart	Baden-Württemberg	
9	Düsseldorf Hbf	91.3	20	Düsseldorf	North Rhine-Westphalia	
10	Berlin Ostkreuz	91.3	12	Berlin	Berlin	
11	Nürnberg Hbf	76.7	21	Nuremberg	Bavaria	
12	Berlin-Gesundbrunnen	74.1	10	Berlin	Berlin	
13	Berlin Südkreuz	65.3	10	Berlin	Berlin	
14	München Ostbf	63.5	14	Munich	Bavaria	
15	München Marienplatz	59.5	2	Munich	Bavaria	
16	Essen Hbf	55.5	13	Essen	North Rhine-Westphalia	
17	Berlin Alexanderplatz	55.5	6	Berlin	Berlin	
18	Bremen Hbf	53.7	9	Bremen	Bremen	
19	München-Pasing	50.7	9	Munich	Bavaria	
20	Hamburg-Altona	50.4	12	Hamburg	Hamburg	
21	Leipzig Hbf	49.3	21	Leipzig	Saxony	
22	Duisburg Hbf	47.5	12	Duisburg	North Rhine-Westphalia	
23	Berlin Zoologischer Garten	47.4	6	Berlin	Berlin	
24	Dortmund Hbf	54.7	16	Dortmund	North Rhine-Westphalia	
25	Mannheim Hbf	43.1	9	Mannheim	Baden-Württemberg	
26	Braunschweig Hbf	40.4	8	Braunschweig	Niedersachsen	
27	Berlin Ostbahnhof	36.5	9	Berlin	Berlin	
27	Stuttgart Stadtmitte	36.1	2	Stuttgart	Baden-Württemberg	
28	Frankfurt(M)Konstabler Wache*	35.8	7	Frankfurt am Main	Hesse	
29	Frankfurt(M)Hauptwache*	35.0	6	Frankfurt am Main	Hesse	
30	München Karlsplatz*	32.0	4	Munich	Bavaria	
31	Berlin Warschauer Straße*	31.0	4	Berlin	Berlin	
32	Berlin-Lichtenberg	31.0	8	Berlin	Berlin	
33	Hamburg Harburg	29.2	12	Hamburg	Hamburg	
34	Köln Messe/Deutz	29.2	10	Cologne	North Rhine-Westphalia	
35	Mainz Hbf	27.4	9	Mainz	Rhineland-Palatinate	
36	Freiburg(Breisgau)Hbf	26.6	10	Freiburg	Baden-Württemberg	
37	Hamburg Jungfernstieg	26.6	2	Hamburg	Hamburg	
38	Karlsruhe Hbf	26.3	16	Karlsruhe	Baden-Württemberg	
39	Potsdam Hbf	25.6	6	Potsdam	Brandenburg	
40	Dresden Hbf	24.5	16	Dresden	Saxony	
41	Münster(Westf)Hbf	23.7	9	Münster	North Rhine-Westphalia	
42	Munich Rosenheimer Platz station*	20.3	2	Munich	Bavaria	
43	Frankfurt(Main)Flughfn	19.3	4	Frankfurt am Main	Hesse	
44	Augsburg Hbf	18.3	12	Augsburg	Bavaria	
45	Pforzheim Hbf	18.3	7	Pforzheim	Baden-Württemberg	
46	Tübingen Hbf	18.3	7	Tübingen	Baden-Württemberg	
47	Würzburg Hbf	18.3	11	Würzburg	Bavaria	
48	Wiesbaden Hbf	16.8	10	Wiesbaden	Hesse	
49	Erfurt Hbf	16.8	10	Erfurt	Thuringia	
50	Munich Isartor station*	16.8	2	Munich	Bavaria	
51	Berlin Spandau	16.4	6	Berlin	Berlin	
52	Heidelberg Hbf	15.3	9	Heidelberg	Baden-Württemberg	
53	Halle(S)Hbf	14.6	13	Halle (Saale)	Saxony-Anhalt	
54	Bielefeld Hbf	14.6	8	Bielefeld	North Rhine-Westphalia	
55	Koblenz Hbf	14.6	10	Koblenz	Rhineland-Palatinate	
56	Lübeck Hbf	12.4	9	Lübeck	Schleswig-Holstein	
57	Frankfurt South station	11.9	9	Frankfurt am Main	Hesse	
58	Magdeburg Hbf	11.7	10	Magdeburg	Saxony-Anhalt	
59	Darmstadt Hbf	11.0	11	Darmstadt	Hesse	
60	Hagen Hbf	11.0	16	Hagen	North Rhine-Westphalia	
61	Ulm Hbf	10.6	12	Ulm	Baden-Württemberg	
62	Saarbrücken Hbf	10.0	10	Saarbrücken	Saarland	
63	Berlin Schönhauser Allee station*	9.5	2	Berlin	Berlin	
64	Munich Laim station*	9.3	2	Munich	Bavaria	
65	Kiel Hbf	9.1	8	Kiel	Schleswig-Holstein	
66	Frankfurt Höchst station	8.2	7	Frankfurt am Main	Hesse	
67	Gießen station	7.3	11	Gießen	Hesse	
68	Fulda station	7.3	10	Fulda	Hesse	
69	Hanau Hbf	7.3	11	Hanau	Hesse	
70	Solingen Hbf	7.3	5	Solingen	North Rhine-Westphalia	
71	Hamburg Airport station*	7.3	1	Hamburg	Hamburg	
72	Munich Hackerbrücke station*	6.2	2	Munich	Bavaria	
73	Gelsenkirchen Hbf	4.6	6	Gelsenkirchen	North Rhine-Westphalia	
74	Schwerin Hbf	4.4	4	Schwerin	Mecklenburg-Vorpommern	
75	Worms Hbf	3.7	8	Worms	Rhineland-Palatinate	
76	Berlin Schönefeld Flughafen station*	<3.7	5	Schönefeld	Brandenburg	
77	Jena West	2.6	2	Jena	Thuringia	
78	Gera Hbf	1.8	6	Gera	Thuringia	
79	Eberswalde Hauptbahnhof	<1.8	5	Eberswalde	Brandenburg	
80	Angermünde station	<1.8	5	Angermünde	Brandenburg	
81	Jena Paradies	1.3	2	Jena	Thuringia	

The following table shows the cities with the most passenger entries/exits for all major stations within the city combined. This only includes major stations with official statistics (usually either Category 1 or Category 2 stations). Stations of these categories without data are not included (e.g. Berlin Potsdamer Platz station, Berlin-Wannsee station, Hamburg Dammtor station, Frankfurt (Main) Süd station). Other stations (category 3 and lower) are not included for comparability reasons either.

Rank	City	Annual entries/ exits (millions)	Stations
1	Berlin	577.7	Hauptbahnhof, Friedrichstraße, Zoologischer Garten, Gesundbrunnen, Berlin Südkreuz, Ostbahnhof, Lichtenberg, Berlin Ostkreuz, Berlin Spandau
2	Hamburg	275.6	Hauptbahnhof, Altona, Hamburg Harburg
3	Munich	264.9	Hauptbahnhof, München Ost, Pasing
4	Frankfurt am Main	179.9	Hauptbahnhof
5	Cologne	145.3	Hauptbahnhof, Köln Messe/Deutz
