= LKO =

LKO or lko may refer to:

- Chaudhary Charan Singh International Airport, the IATA code LKO
- Khayo language, the ISO 639-3 code lko
- Lucknow Charbagh railway station, the station code LKO
- Könnern station, the DS100 code LKO
