= Altenburg station =

Railway station in Altenburg, Germany

Altenburg
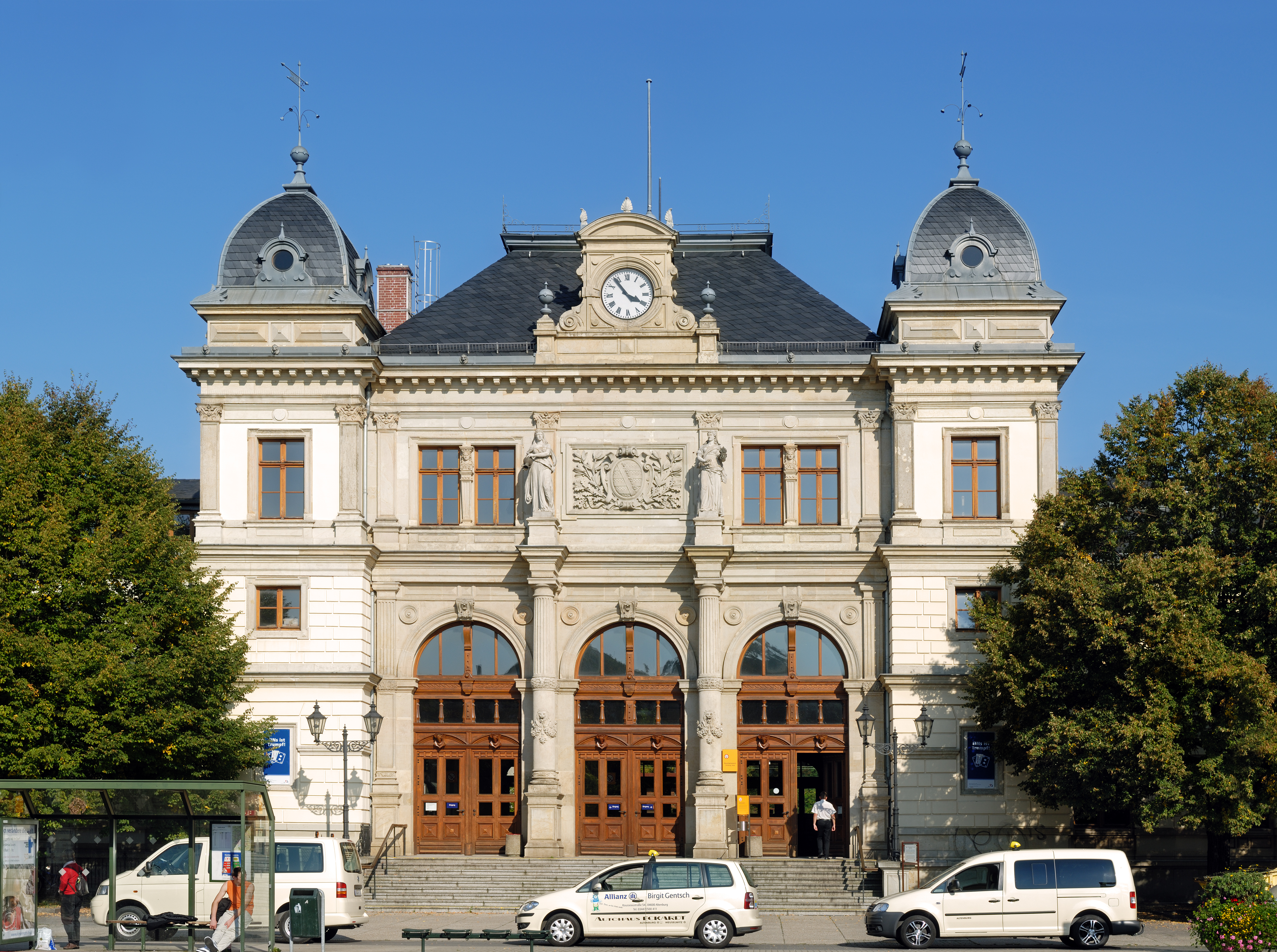
- Entrance building in 2009

General information
- Location: Wettiner Str. 15, Altenburg, Thuringia; Germany
- Coordinates: 50°59′51″N 12°26′37″E
- Owner: Deutsche Bahn
- Operator: DB Station&Service
- Lines: Leipzig–Hof; Zeitz–Altenburg (closed in 2007); Altenburg–Langenleuba (closed in 1998)
- Platforms: (5) 4 in operation (tracks 1, 2, 3, 4)

Construction
- Accessible: Yes

Other information
- Station code: 89
- DS100 code: LA
- IBNR: 8010003
- Category: 5
- Fare zone: MDV: 322
- Website: www.bahnhof.de

History
- Opened: 1878

Services
Preceding station	DB Regio Südost	Following station
Lehndorf towards Erfurt Hbf	RE 3	Terminus
Preceding station	Mitteldeutschland S-Bahn	Following station
Treben-Lehma towards Halle (Saale) Hbf	S 5	Lehndorf towards Zwickau Hbf
Böhlen towards Halle (Saale) Hbf	S 5x	Lehndorf towards Zwickau Hbf
Location
- Location within Thuringia Location within Germany Location within Europe

Altenburg station is on the Saxon-Bavarian Railway from Leipzig to Hof in the city of Altenburg in the German state of Thuringia. South of Altenburg, in Lehndorf, the line to Gera branches to the west. Passenger services on other lines have been closed to Zeitz and to Narsdorf.

== History ==
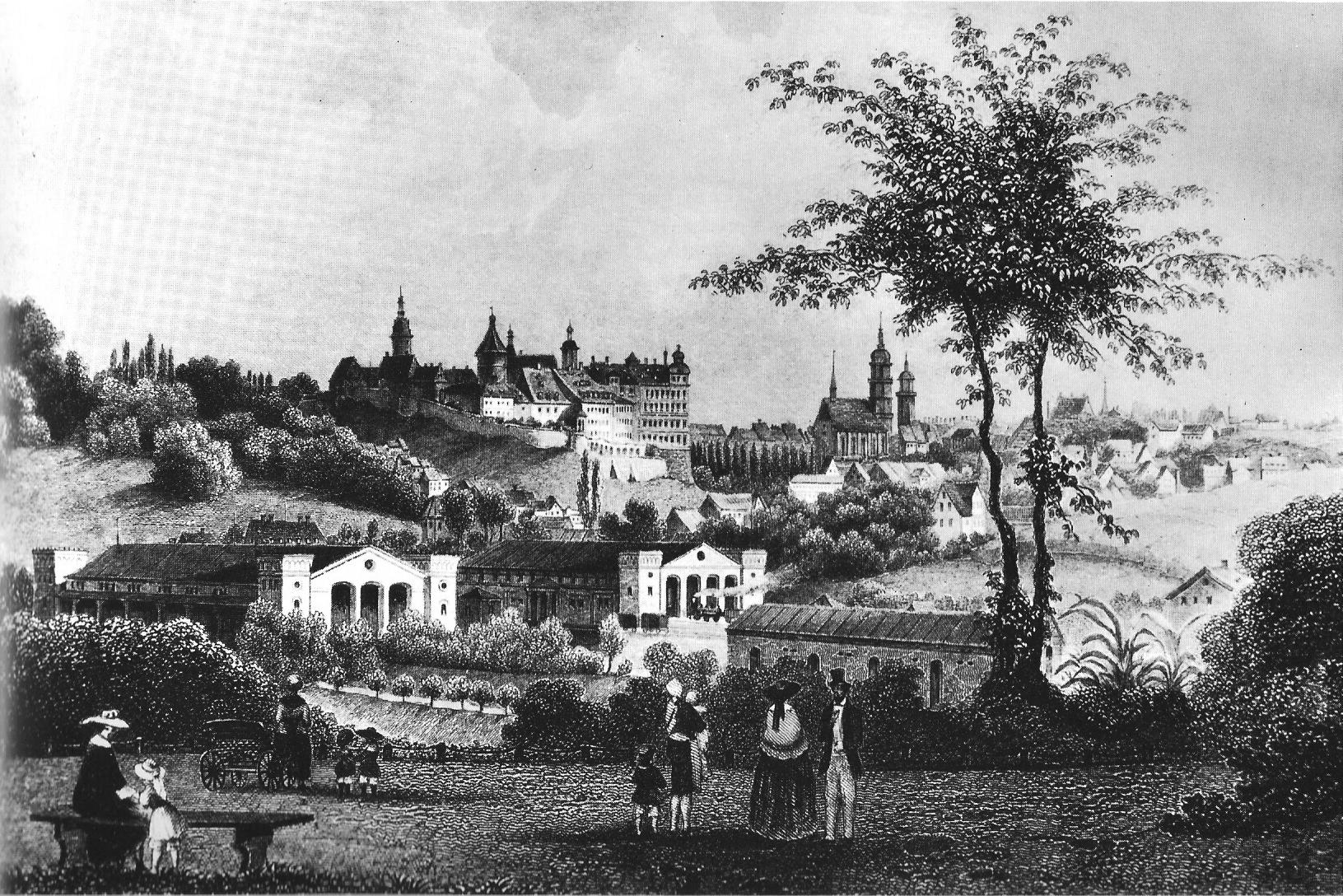
Altenburg station in 1860

=== Terminal station ===
The original Altenburg station was located elsewhere on today's Fabrikstraße (street). Its opening ceremony was held on 19 September 1842 and it was the first station in the Ernestine duchies. The Duchy of Saxe-Altenburg required the station to be built as close as possible to the Residenzstadt (city with a royal palace) of Altenburg, which had the consequence that a further construction of the line to the south was not possible for topographical reasons and thus to the station was built as a terminal station. As a result, the line to Hof first ran a short distance to the north and then made a 180-degree turn into the valley of the Pleiße, which is located east of the city.

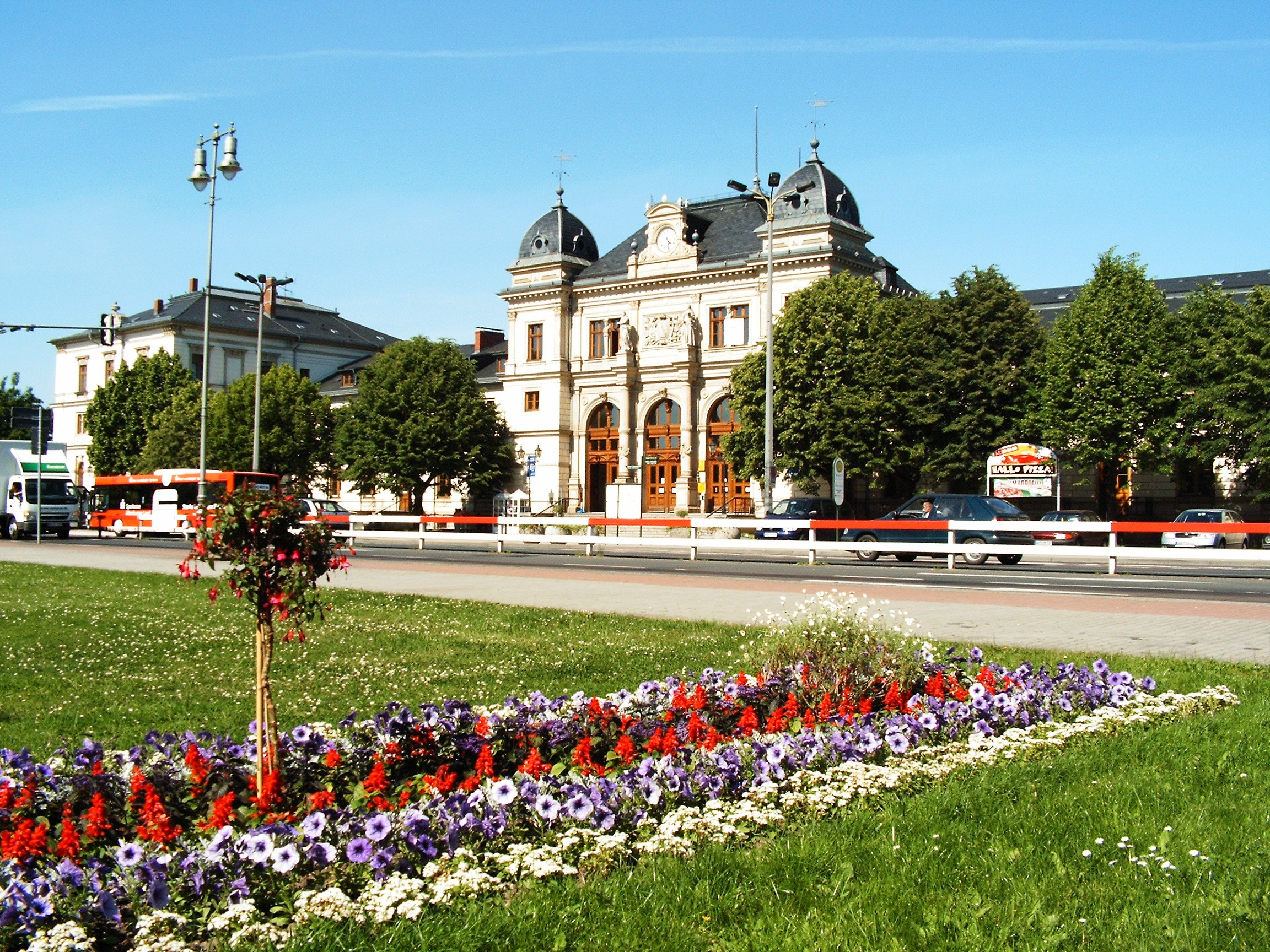
Front to Altenburg station in 2006

=== Altenburg Hauptbahnhof ===
Increasing traffic meant that the terminal station could no longer cope. In 1876, work began on a new station a little further to the east and the mainline was moved to a new route running south through a 375 m-long (1,230 ft) tunnel. On 25 September 1878, the first train ran through the new tunnel. There are still remains of the former station on Fabrikstraße. The roof of Altenburg tunnel was removed for the electrification of the Leipzig–Hof line between 1957 and 1959.

Immediately northwest of the passenger station the, now defunct, Zeitz line ran through the marshalling yard, which is now let as sidings to the Villmanngruppe company.

As part of economic stimulus package, Altenburg station is being renovated by DB Station & Service. The focus of the project is the renewal and renovation of the platforms (raising of the platform edges to suit Intercity-Express services) and the sealing of the main platform roof. A new lift will facilitate access to the central platform, which are used by tracks 2 and 3.

== Passenger services ==
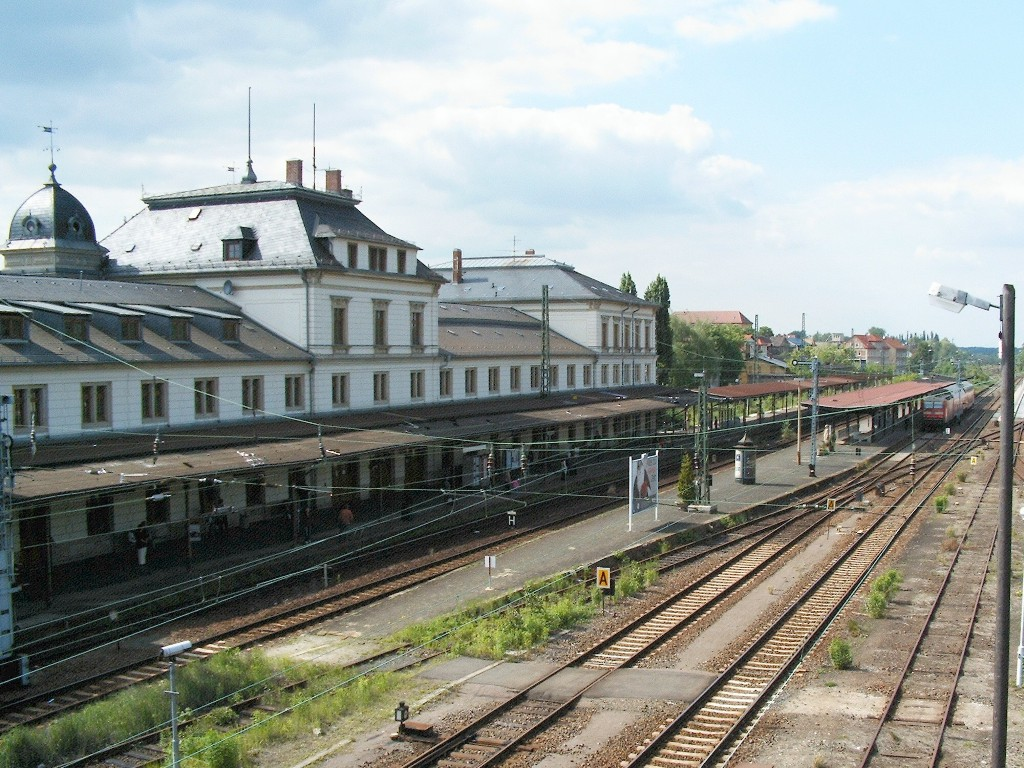
Altenburg station in 2006, trackside

The station is on served by services on timetable routes 501.5 and 540, which are operated by DB Regio. Express service RE3 to Gera and Erfurt runs every two hours, express service S5X hourly to Halle, Leipzig and Zwickau. Regional service S5 runs hourly towards Leipzig (northbound) and every two hours to Zwickau (southbound).

== See also ==
- Rail transport in Germany
- Railway stations in Germany
