= Hohenthurm station =

Railway station in Landsberg, Germany

Hohenthurm
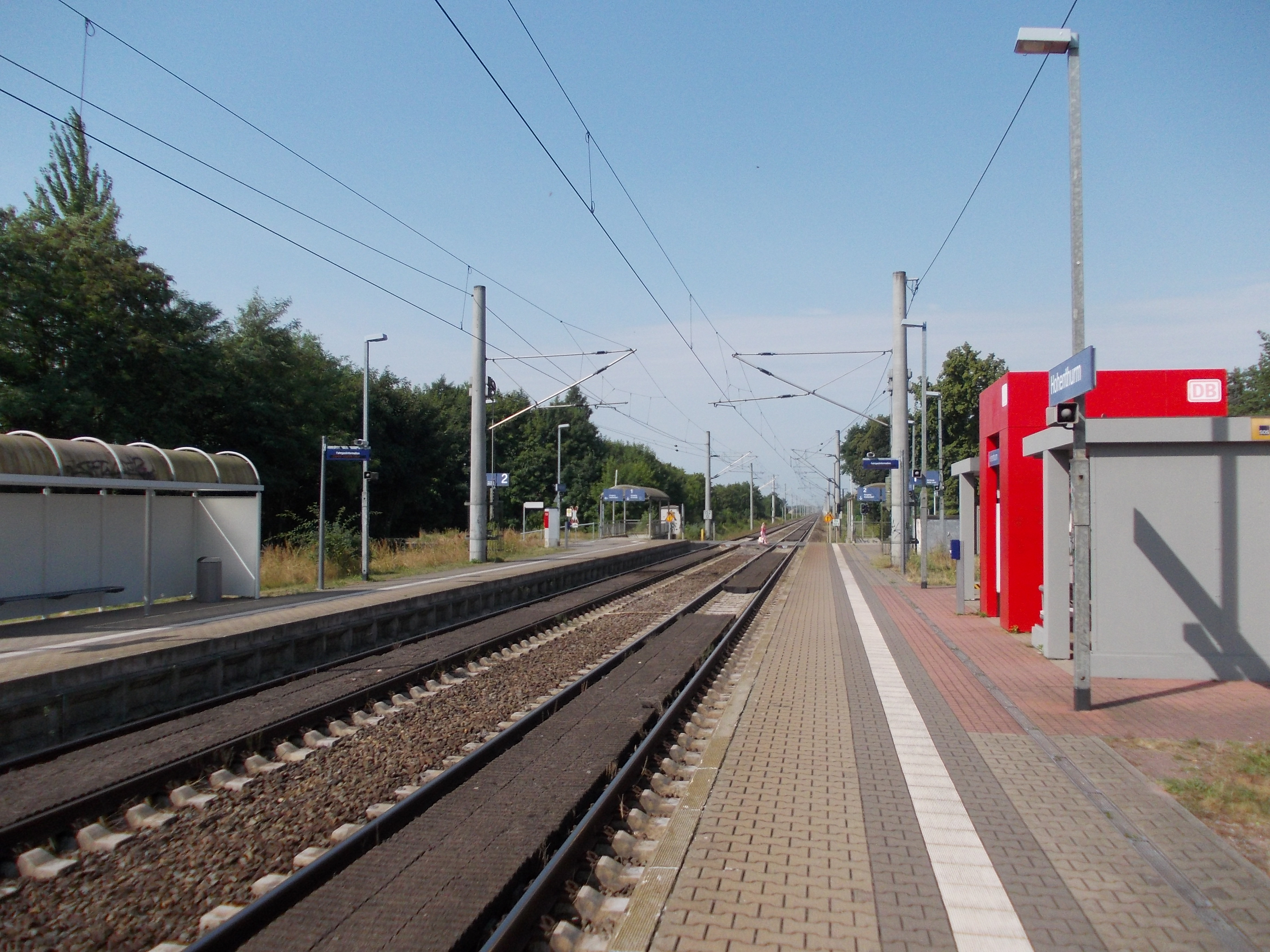
- 2013

General information
- Location: Alte Bahnhofstraße; 06188 Hohenthurm; Saxony-Anhalt; Germany
- Coordinates: 51.512°N 12.098°E
- System: Hp
- Owner: Deutsche Bahn
- Operator: DB Station&Service
- Lines: Berlin–Halle railway (KBS 250)
- Platforms: 2 side platforms
- Tracks: 2
- Train operators: S-Bahn Mitteldeutschland
- Connections: S 8

Construction
- Parking: no
- Cycle facilities: no
- Accessible: yes

Other information
- Station code: 2863
- DS100 code: LHM
- IBNR: 8011905
- Category: 6
- Fare zone: MDV: 224
- Website: www.bahnhof.de

Services
Preceding station	Mitteldeutschland S-Bahn	Following station
Halle (Saale) Hbf Terminus	S 8	Landsberg (b Halle/Saale) towards Lutherstadt Wittenberg Hbf
Location
- Location within Saxony-Anhalt Location within Germany Location within Europe

Hohenthurm station (German: Haltepunkt Hohenthurm) is a railway station in the municipality of Hohenthurm, located in the Saalekreis district in Saxony-Anhalt, Germany.
