= Röblingen am See station =

Train station in Röblingen am See, Germany

Röblingen am See

General information
- Location: Am Bahnhof 1; 06317 Röblingen am See; Saxony-Anhalt; Germany
- Coordinates: 51.4624°N 11.6690°E
- System: Bf
- Owner: Deutsche Bahn
- Operator: DB Station&Service
- Lines: Halle–Hann. Münden railway (KBS 590)
- Platforms: 1 island platform 1 side platform
- Tracks: 4
- Train operators: Abellio Rail Mitteldeutschland
- Connections: 1 704 705

Other information
- Station code: 5296
- DS100 code: LRN
- IBNR: 8010299
- Category: 5
- Fare zone: MDV: 299 (only if traveling between MDV zones 221 and 231)
- Website: www.bahnhof.de

Services
Preceding station	Abellio Rail Mitteldeutschland	Following station
Lutherstadt Eisleben towards Leinefelde	RE 8	Halle (Saale) Hbf Terminus
Lutherstadt Eisleben towards Kassel-Wilhelmshöhe	RE 9	Halle (Saale) Hbf Terminus
Preceding station	Mitteldeutschland S-Bahn	Following station
Erdeborn towards Lutherstadt Eisleben or Sangerhausen	S 7	Amsdorf towards Halle (Saale) Hbf
Location
- Location within Saxony-Anhalt Location within Germany Location within Europe

Röblingen am See station is a railway station in the municipality of Röblingen am See, located in the Mansfeld-Südharz district in Saxony-Anhalt, Germany.
