= Lutherstadt Eisleben station =

Railway station in Lutherstadt Eisleben, Germany

Lutherstadt Eisleben
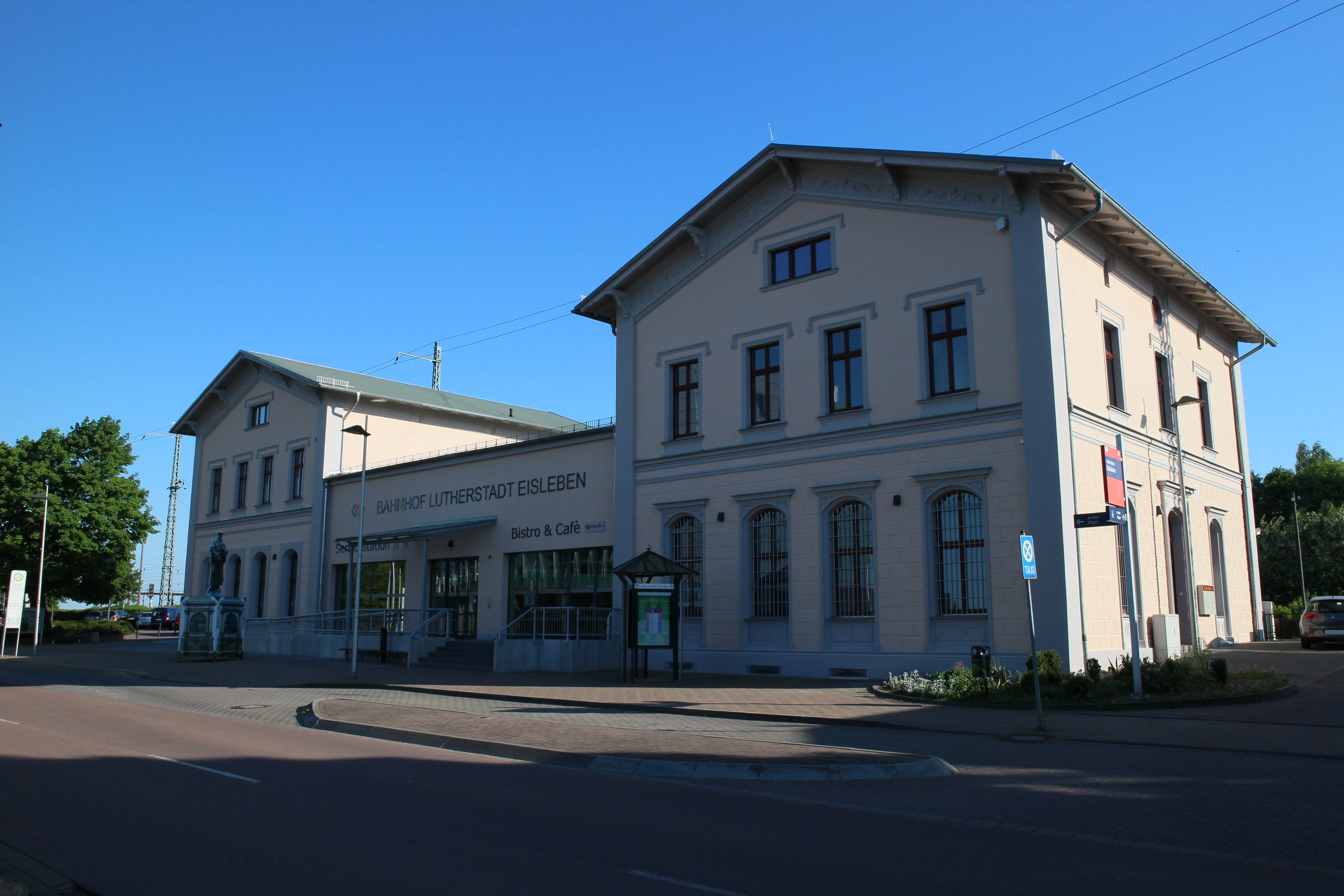
- 2018

General information
- Location: Bahnhofsring 11; 06295 Lutherstadt Eisleben; Saxony-Anhalt; Germany
- Coordinates: 51.5184°N 11.5510°E
- Elevation: 171 m (561 ft)
- System: Bf
- Owner: Deutsche Bahn
- Operator: DB Station&Service
- Lines: Halle–Hann. Münden railway (KBS 590)
- Platforms: 2 side platforms
- Tracks: 4
- Train operators: Abellio Rail Mitteldeutschland
- Connections: Bus interchange

Other information
- Station code: 3862
- DS100 code: LEL
- IBNR: 8012279
- Category: 5
- Website: www.bahnhof.de

Services
Preceding station	Abellio Rail Mitteldeutschland	Following station
Wolferode towards Leinefelde	RE 8	Röblingen am See towards Halle (Saale) Hbf
Wolferode towards Kassel-Wilhelmshöhe	RE 9	Röblingen am See towards Halle (Saale) Hbf
Preceding station	Mitteldeutschland S-Bahn	Following station
Wolferode towards Sangerhausen	S 7	Erdeborn towards Halle (Saale) Hbf
Terminus	S 7	Erdeborn towards Halle (Saale) Hbf
Location
- Location within Saxony-Anhalt Location within Germany Location within Europe

Lutherstadt Eisleben station is a railway station in the municipality of Lutherstadt Eisleben, located in the Mansfeld-Südharz district in Saxony-Anhalt, Germany.
