= Halle (Saale) Hauptbahnhof =

Train stop in Saxony-Anhalt

Halle (Saale) Hbf
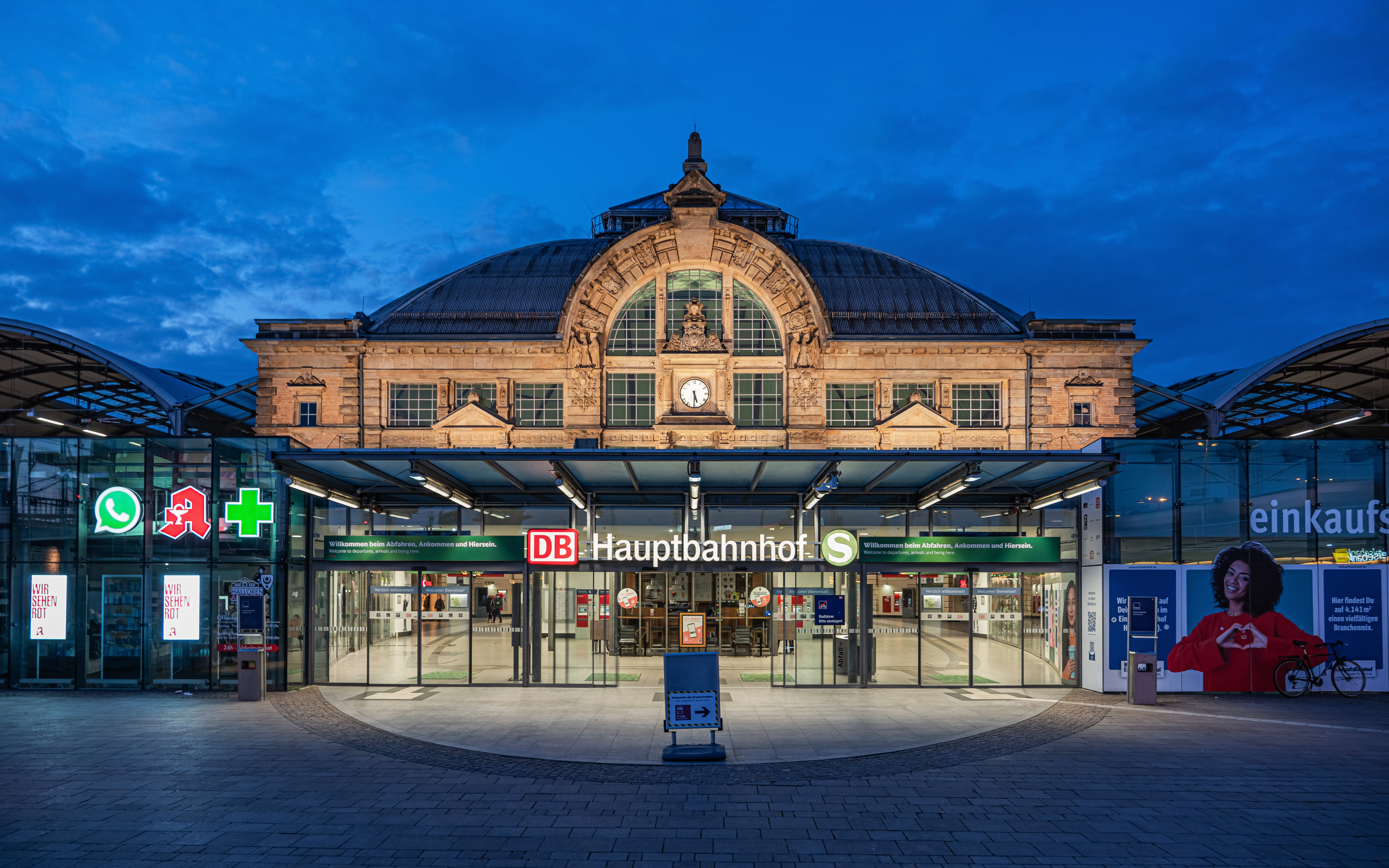
- Façade of the station building

General information
- Location: Bahnhofsplatz 1, Halle (Saale), Saxony-Anhalt; NW from center
- Coordinates: 51°28′41″N 11°59′12″E
- Owner: Deutsche Bahn
- Operator: DB InfraGO
- Lines: Halle–Eilenburg (KBS 219); Berlin–Halle (KBS 250); Halle–Halberstadt (KBS 330); Magdeburg–Leipzig (KBS 340); Halle–Erfurt (KBS 581); Halle–Kassel (KBS 590)
- Platforms: 12 + 1
- Connections: 2 4 5 7 9 10 12

Construction
- Accessible: Yes

Other information
- Station code: 2498
- DS100 code: LH
- Category: 2
- Fare zone: MDV: 210
- Website: www.bahnhof.de

History
- Opened: 8 October 1890; 135 years ago
- Electrified: 1922-1946 (Note: Since 1946 catenaries and overhead line masts were dismantled as Soviet war reparations.); 1 September 1955; 70 years ago
Services
Preceding station	DB Fernverkehr	Following station
Bitterfeld towards Berlin Gesundbrunnen	ICE 11	Erfurt Hbf One-way operation
Berlin Südkreuz towards Ostseebad Binz	ICE 15	Erfurt Hbf towards Saarbrücken Hbf
Berlin Südkreuz towards Berlin Gesundbrunnen or Hamburg-Altona	ICE 18	Erfurt Hbf towards München Hbf
Berlin Südkreuz towards Berlin Hbf	ICE 29 Sprinter	Erfurt Hbf towards München Hbf
Köthen towards Stuttgart Hbf	IC 55	Leipzig/Halle Airport towards Dresden Hbf
Köthen towards Norddeich Mole	IC 56	Leipzig Hbf Terminus
Köthen towards Rostock Hbf or Warnemünde	IC 57	Leipzig Hbf Terminus
Berlin Südkreuz towards Berlin Gesundbrunnen	ICE 91	Erfurt Hbf towards Wien Hbf
Preceding station		Following station
Berlin Südkreuz towards Berlin Hbf	FLX 10	Erfurt Hbf towards Stuttgart Hbf
Preceding station	Abellio Rail Mitteldeutschland	Following station
Terminus	RE 8	Röblingen am See towards Leinefelde
Terminus	RE 9	Röblingen am See towards Kassel Hbf
Terminus	RE 16	Merseburg towards Erfurt Hbf
Terminus	RB 25	Halle-Ammendorf towards Saalfeld (Saale)
Preceding station	Start	Following station
Könnern towards Goslar	RE 4	Terminus
Könnern towards Halberstadt Hbf	RE 24	Terminus
Halle Steintorbrücke towards Magdeburg Hbf	RB 47	Terminus
Preceding station	DB Regio Südost	Following station
Zöberitz towards Magdeburg Hbf	RE 30	Terminus
Preceding station	Mitteldeutschland S-Bahn	Following station
Halle Steintorbrücke towards Halle-Nietleben	S 3	Halle Messe towards Wurzen or Oschatz
Terminus	S 5	Leipzig/Halle Airport towards Zwickau Hbf
Terminus	S 5x	Leipzig/Halle Airport towards Zwickau Hbf
Terminus	S 7	Halle Rosengarten towards Eisleben or Sangerhausen
Terminus	S 8	Hohenthurm towards Lutherstadt Wittenberg Hbf
Terminus	S 9	Peißen towards Eilenburg
Terminus	S 11	Halle-Ammendorf towards Querfurt
Halle Steintorbrücke towards Halle-Trotha	S 47	Terminus
Location

Halle (Saale) Hauptbahnhof is the main railway station in the city of Halle (Saale) in southern part of the German state of Saxony-Anhalt. The station is situated east of the city centre and is a category 2 station.

The station is one of the most important transport hubs in the state of Saxony-Anhalt. It is a stop for long-distance and regional services. In addition, it is part of the S-Bahn Mitteldeutschland network and is served by the trams and buses that are part of the city's public transport.

== Layout ==
Halle is an 'island station', i.e. it is located between the main sets of tracks. It has 13 platforms, of which 10 are covered by the station hall. The actual station building is located in the middle between tracks 6 and 7. In the station halls are small shops and restaurants/cafes.

Northeast of the tracks of the passenger station is the Halle freight yard.

== History ==
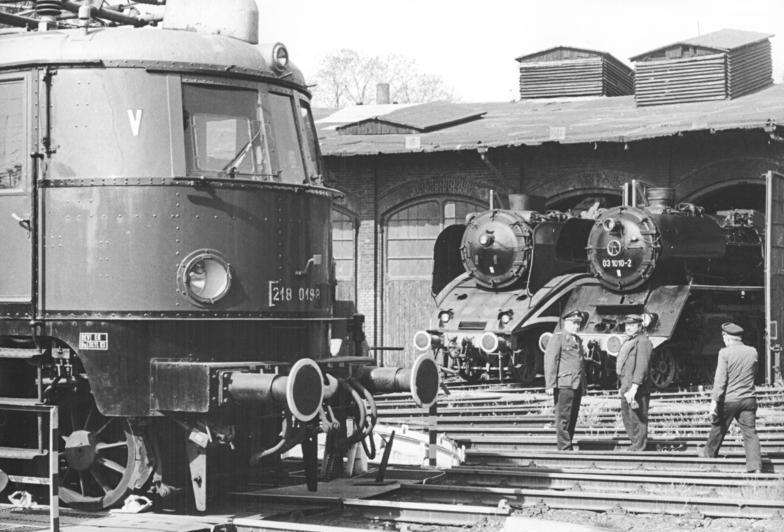
Museum locos at BW Halle Hbf on 15.6.1988

In mid-1840 the Magdeburg-Leipzig Railway – initiated by city councillor, Matthäus Ludwig Wucherer, who supported the building of a railway from Magdeburg to Leipzig via Halle – built the first station in Halle, which was subsequently (1845 to 1847) rebuilt again to form a junction with the Thuringian Railway. The unusual feature of the route between Magdeburg and Leipzig was that it was the first cross-border railway link (from Prussia through Anhalt-Köthen to Saxony).

As further routes were added the station soon became too small, but could not be expanded because the various railway companies could not agree an overall concept. Not until 8 October 1890, after the nationalisation of one company and a five-year construction period could the new passenger station be opened.

=== Renovations of the station ===
The station concourse was spared major bomb damage during the Second World War, although the first and second class dining room sustained damage from a light bomb attack.

The S-Bahn was opened in 1967 and a new platform was added on the west side. It was built outside the western platform hall on a former locomotive track, receiving a platform canopy. It has barrier-free access from Ernst-Kamieth-Straße. Städteexpress ("city express") trains stopped in Halle from 1976 to 1993. In 1967/68, the station hall received an aluminium curtain wall in the style of the architecture of the time, which gave the entrance building from the station forecourt a typical socialist modernist appearance. This curtain wall was removed in 1984. The domed hall, the vestibule and the eastern dining room were renovated. During the adaption of Riebeckplatz in 1967 for the convenience of car users, the tram stops were moved far from the station under the elevated road bridges on what was then called Thälmannplatz. This made transfers between trains and trams difficult with long distances. It was not until 2005 that these were significantly improved with a new redesign of Riebeckplatz and the area surrounding the station.

In 2002, the station building was extensively renovated, rebuilt and equipped with areas for shops. Between 2005 and 2011, the southern approach was extensively rebuilt over a length of five kilometres to integrate the new Erfurt–Leipzig/Halle line then under construction.

Further upgrades for the Halle railway junction were planned at a cost of around €400 million. The ground-breaking ceremony for the construction of the new Halle train formation facility, which cost €146 million, took place on 26 September 2012. A second stage of the development area included the northern connection of the Berlin–Halle/Leipzig line (project VDE 8.3) and the renewal of the track and catenary systems in the station area. Two new electronic interlockings replaced 20 old interlockings. The associated financing agreement for €252 million was signed at the end of October 2012, of which €223 million was to be borne by the federal government. Further financing agreements were still pending in June 2013.

The railway junction was renovated from September 2014 at a cost of more than €500 million. Among other things, the new and upgraded lines as well as the freight yard were integrated and all platforms of the station were demolished and rebuilt. The connection to the high-speed lines was intended to take place between 2015 and 2017 and the station itself was to be rebuilt in 2016 and 2017. The project, which was repeatedly postponed for financial reasons, was considered the largest infrastructure project by Deutsche Bahn in Saxony-Anhalt. The maximum speed allowed in the station area was increased from 40 to 160 km/h.

At the beginning of December 2013, Deutsche Bahn put out a Europe-wide tender for a package that included, among other things, the dismantling of 28 kilometres of track and 71 sets of points as well as the construction of 22 kilometres of track and 150 sets of points. The measures would be implemented between August 2014 and March 2017.

Four kilometres of track and 54 new points went into operation on 28 November 2015 as part of a five-day full closure. This made it possible to bypass the east side, which was to be rebuilt first. In the 2016 annual timetable, the east side of the main station was closed for a year and rebuilt; the west side was to follow in the 2017 annual timetable. The conversion was to be completed in 2018.

Deutsche Bahn announced a construction delay on 2 May 2016. The condition of the tracks on the eastern side turned out to be worse than expected. This would now not be completed until the end of 2017 and the west side would then be rebuilt by the end of 2019. An additional temporary platform and additional switch connections would improve the quality of operations. This temporary platform 13a was built on the track of the freight bypass route 6349 (Halle Gbf, Hg12 – Halle Hbf Al). During the reconstruction of the eastern side, it was only accessible via Delitzscher Straße. The costs for two construction phases, which were awarded in August 2014 for €49 million, increased to €84 million at the beginning of July 2016, taking inflation into account. During the conversion, the short cantilever roof in the stair area of platform 11/12 (after the conversion 12/13), which was built during the Second World War, was completely omitted.

Signal box Hp 5 built on a bridge located in the southern approach to the station was a distinctive landmark of the station. It was an electromechanical signal box built in 1912. The building was demolished on 22 May 2017 as part of a full closure of the Halle junction. From 22 November 2017, 10 p.m. until the morning of 30 November 2017, the railway junction was closed in order to put the electronic signal box and the converted eastern side of the station (tracks 8 to 13) into operation. The western side (tracks 2 to 6) was then closed for further reconstruction. During construction, tracks 1 and 1a were used by the S3 of the Mitteldeutschland S-Bahn and the Harz-Elbe-Express.

Platforms 4 to 7 (previously 3 to 6) went back into service on 2 December 2019. The junction was partially blockaded from 25 November to 28 November 2019 (morning) and then completely blockaded until 2 December 2019 (morning). Tracks 1 to 3 (previously 1a, 1 and 2) were then rebuilt, and during the last full closure of the junction between 14 and 17 January 2021, they were returned to operation on 17 January 2021, 6 p.m.

This ended the work on the inner junction in Halle.

Around €850 million was spent on the work, including the freight yard and the new train formation facility. The arcades under the railway tracks on the western side of the station were also renovated.

For cost reasons, the initially plan to place long-distance traffic between Berlin and Erfurt and Magdeburg and Leipzig on a common platform for each direction, including grade-separated approaches and departures, was abandoned.

In the area of the station, Halle Saale Hbf (West) is one of the five ETCS route control centres of the new routes of the German Unity Transport Project No. 8. The Halle area is to be equipped with digital interlockings and ETCS by 2030 as part of the "starter package" of Digital Rail Germany, as part of the Scandinavian–Mediterranean Corridor of the Trans-European Transport Network. A tender for planning services did not find any suitable participants in autumn 2022.

== Rail services ==
=== Long-distance services ===
The station is on the intersection of railway links from Berlin to Erfurt and Dresden to Magdeburg. InterCity (IC) and Intercity-Express (ICE) trains stop at the station.

Line	Route	Frequency	Stock	Remarks
ICE 11	Munich → Augsburg → Stuttgart → Mannheim → Frankfurt Airport → Frankfurt → Erfurt → Halle → Berlin → Berlin Gesundbrunnen	1 train	ICE T, ICE 4	
ICE 15	Saarbrücken – Kaiserslautern – Mannheim – Darmstadt – Frankfurt – Erfurt – Halle – Berlin – Stralsund – Binz	Every two hours	ICE T, ICE 3	
ICE 18	Hamburg-Altona – Hamburg – Berlin – Halle – Erfurt – Nuremberg – Augsburg – Munich	120	ICE 1, ICE 4	
ICE 29	Munich – Nuremberg – Erfurt – Halle – Berlin Südkreuz – Berlin Hbf (low level)	120	ICE 3	ICE Sprinter
IC 55	Dresden – Riesa – Leipzig – Halle – Magdeburg – Braunschweig – Hannover – Bielefeld – Dortmund – Wuppertal – Cologne – Bonn – Mainz – Mannheim – Heidelberg – Stuttgart (– Tübingen)	120	IC2, ICE-1	
IC 56	Leipzig – Halle – Magdeburg – Braunschweig – Hannover – Bremen – Oldenburg – Leer – Emden (– Norddeich Mole)	120	IC2	
IC 57	Leipzig – Halle – Magdeburg – Stendal – Wittenberge – Ludwigslust – Schwerin – Rostock (– Warnemünde)	2 train pairs	IC2, ICE T	
ICE 91	Berlin – Halle – Erfurt – Coburg – Nuremberg – Passau – Linz – St. Pölten – Vienna	1 train pair	ICE T	
Flixtrain FLX 10	Berlin Hbf – Berlin Südkreuz – Halle (Saale) – Erfurt – Gotha – Eisenach – Fulda – Frankfurt South – Darmstadt – Weinheim – Heidelberg – Stuttgart	2 train pairs		

=== Local services ===
Halle is linked to the surrounding area with local services on the RB, RE and S-Bahn lines as well as other cities such as Kassel or Eisenach.

Line	Route		Interval (min)	Operator
RE 3	Halle – Bitterfeld – Wittenberg – Jüterbog – Berlin – Eberswalde – Greifswald – Stralsund		Some services	DB Regio Nordost
RE 4	Halle – Könnern – Aschersleben – Halberstadt – Wernigerode – Vienenburg – Goslar		120	Start
RE 8	Halle – Eisleben – Sangerhausen – Berga-Kelbra – Nordhausen;– Leinefelde		120	Abellio
RE 9	Halle – Eisleben – Sangerhausen – Nordhausen – Leinefelde – Kassel-Wilhelmshöhe		120	Abellio
RE 16	Halle – Merseburg – Weißenfels – Naumburg – Apolda – Weimar – Erfurt		60	Abellio
RE 24	Halle – Könnern – Sandersleben – Aschersleben – Gatersleben – Halberstadt		120	Start
RE 30	Halle – Köthen – Calbe – Schönebeck – Magdeburg-Buckau – Magdeburg		60	DB Regio Südost
RB 25	Halle – Merseburg – Weißenfels – Naumburg – Jena Paradies – Orlamünde – Saalfeld		60	Abellio
RB 47	Halle – Halle-Trotha – Könnern – Baalberge – Bernburg – Calbe – Schönebeck – Magdeburg (Sat-Sun only: Halle-Calbe every 120 min)		60 (Halle–Könnern); 120 (Könnern–Magdeburg)	Start
S 3	Halle-Nietleben – Halle-Südstadt – Halle – Schkeuditz – Leipzig – Leipzig-Stötteritz – Wurzen (– Oschatz)		30 (Halle-Nietleben–Wurzen) some trains (Wurzen–Oschatz)	DB Regio Südost
S 5	Halle – Leipzig/Halle Airport – Leipzig – Leipzig-Connewitz – Altenburg – Zwickau		60 (Halle–Altenburg); 120 (Altenburg–Zwickau)	DB Regio Südost
S 5X	Halle – Leipzig/Halle Airport – Leipzig – Leipzig-Connewitz – Altenburg – Zwickau		60	DB Regio Südost
S 7	Halle – Halle-Südstadt – Teutschenthal – Röblingen – Eisleben (– Sangerhausen)		60 (Halle–Eisleben) some trains (Eisleben–Sangerhausen)	Abellio
S 8	Halle – Landsberg – Bitterfeld –	Wolfen – Dessau	30 (Halle–Bitterfeld Mon–Fri); 60 (Halle–Bitterfeld Sat–Sun); 120 (Bitterfeld–Dessau); 120 (Bitterfeld–Wittenberg)	DB Regio Südost
S 8	Halle – Landsberg – Bitterfeld –	Gräfenhainichen – Wittenberg (– Jüterbog)	30 (Halle–Bitterfeld Mon–Fri); 60 (Halle–Bitterfeld Sat–Sun); 120 (Bitterfeld–Dessau); 120 (Bitterfeld–Wittenberg)	DB Regio Südost
S 9	Halle – Delitzsch – Eilenburg		60 (Mo–Fr); 120 (Sat–Sun)	DB Regio Südost
S 11	Halle – Halle-Ammendorf – Schkopau – Merseburg – Frankleben – Braunsbedra – Mücheln (Geiseltal) – Querfurt		60	DB Regio Südost
S 47	Halle – Halle Zoo – Halle-Trotha		60	DB Regio Südost
As of December 2024

== Internal city transport links ==
The station is accessible from several major roads. A fast road (An der Magistrale) links the Hauptbahnhof to the west of the city (Neustadt, Nietleben and Dölau districts) and the B 80 links it to the western outskirts of Halle (Halleschen Vorland (West)).

The public transport system is provided by HAVAG. Tram routes 2, 4, 5, 7, 9, 10 and 12 and bus routes 30 and 44 all stop at the station, as do OBS buses.

== Goods traffic ==
The Halle (Saale) marshalling yard on both sides of the tracks to the east next to the passenger station was formerly important, but is largely closed today. A modern marshalling yard is planned to be built on the same site however.

== See also ==
- Rail transport in Germany
- Railway stations in Germany
