= Railway stations in Germany =

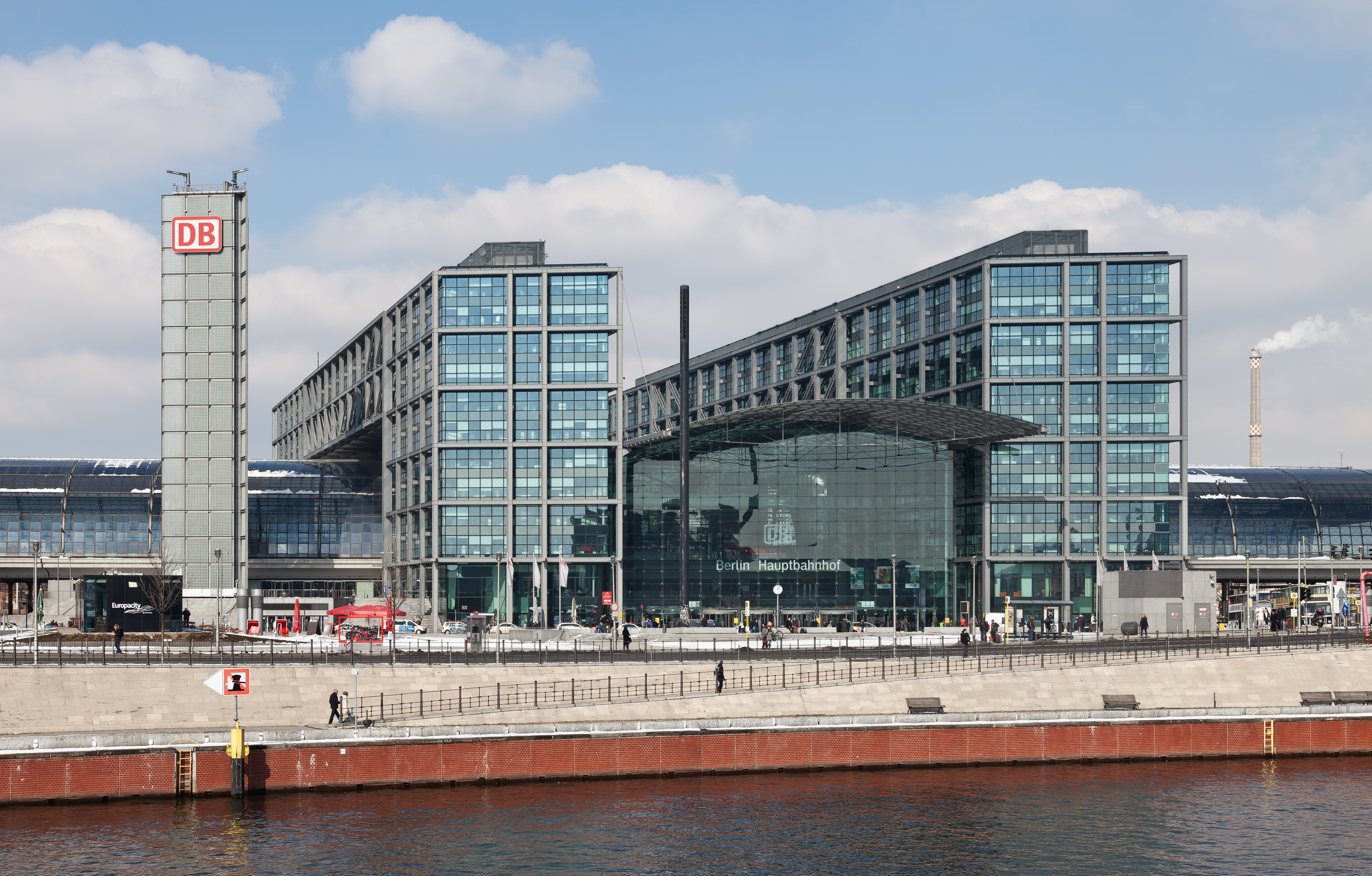
Berlin Hauptbahnhof

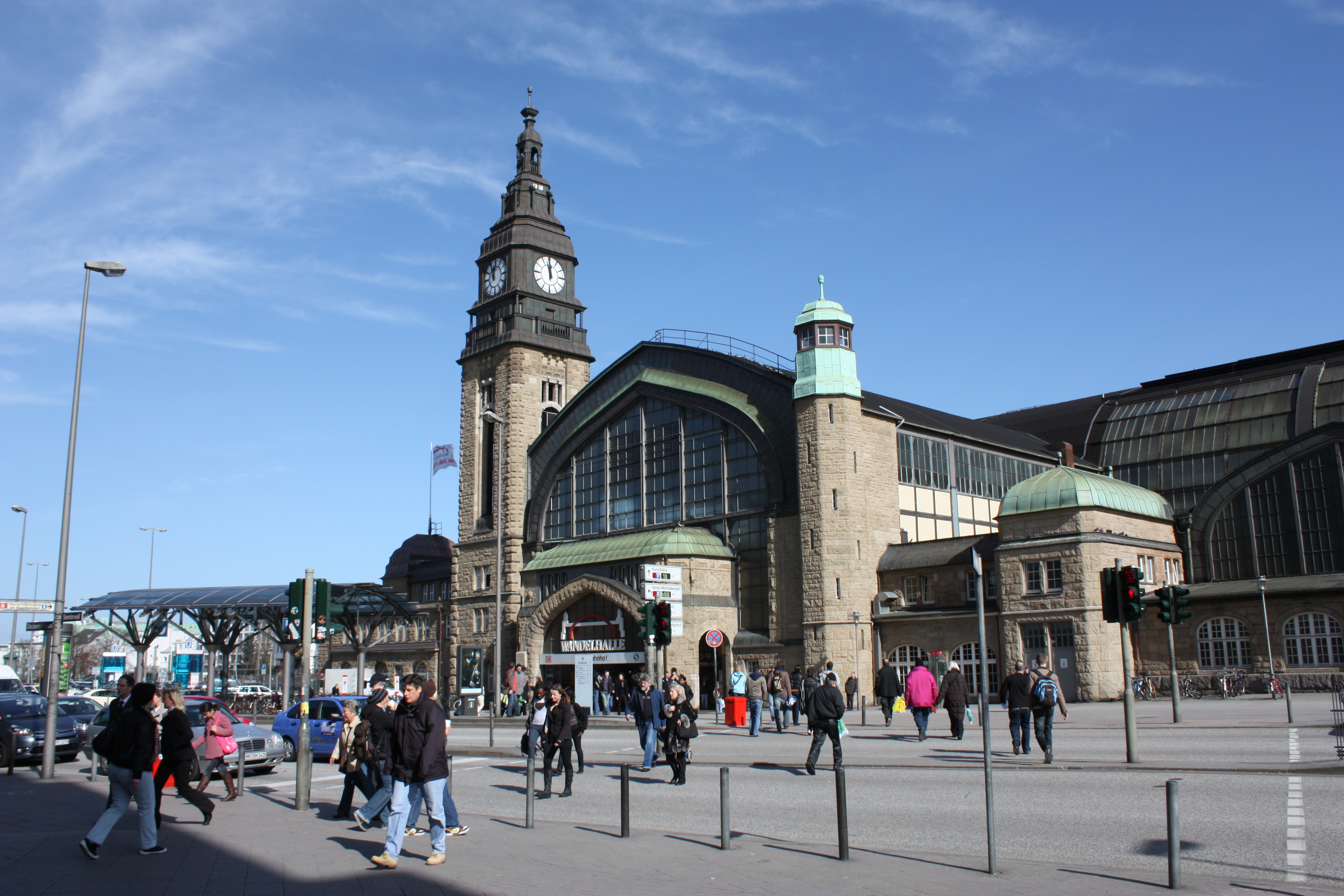
Hamburg Hauptbahnhof

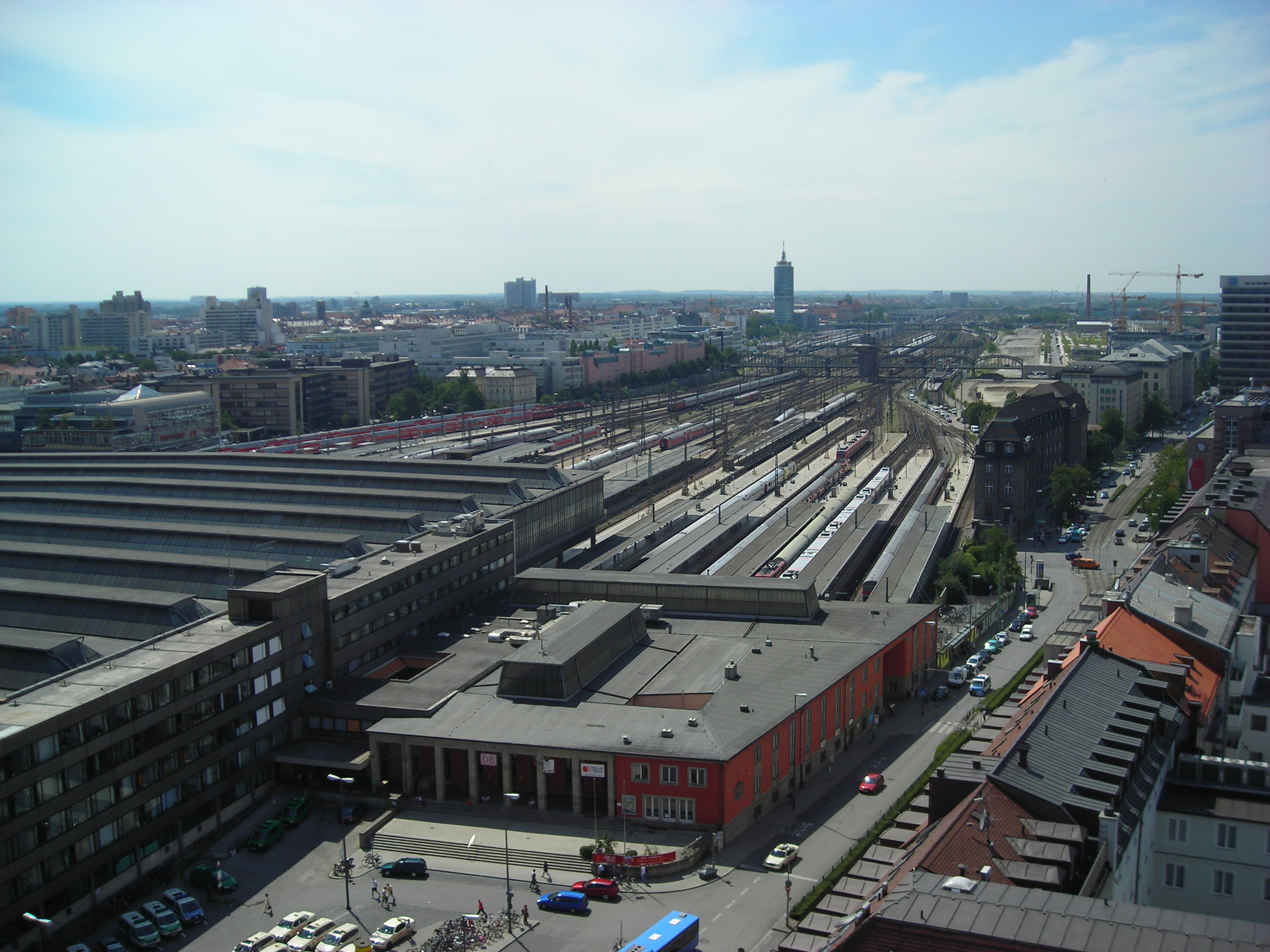
Munich Hauptbahnhof

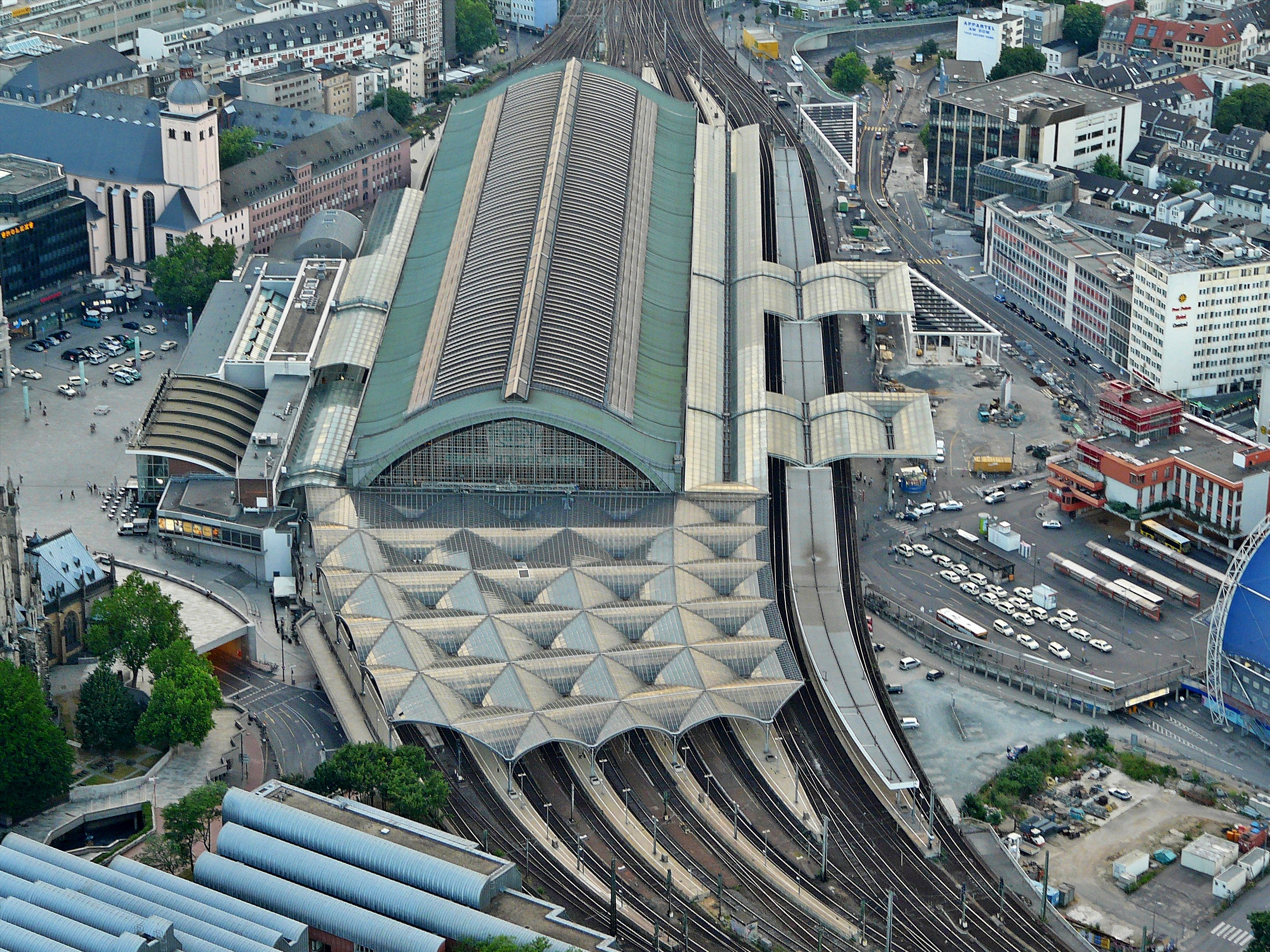
Cologne Hauptbahnhof

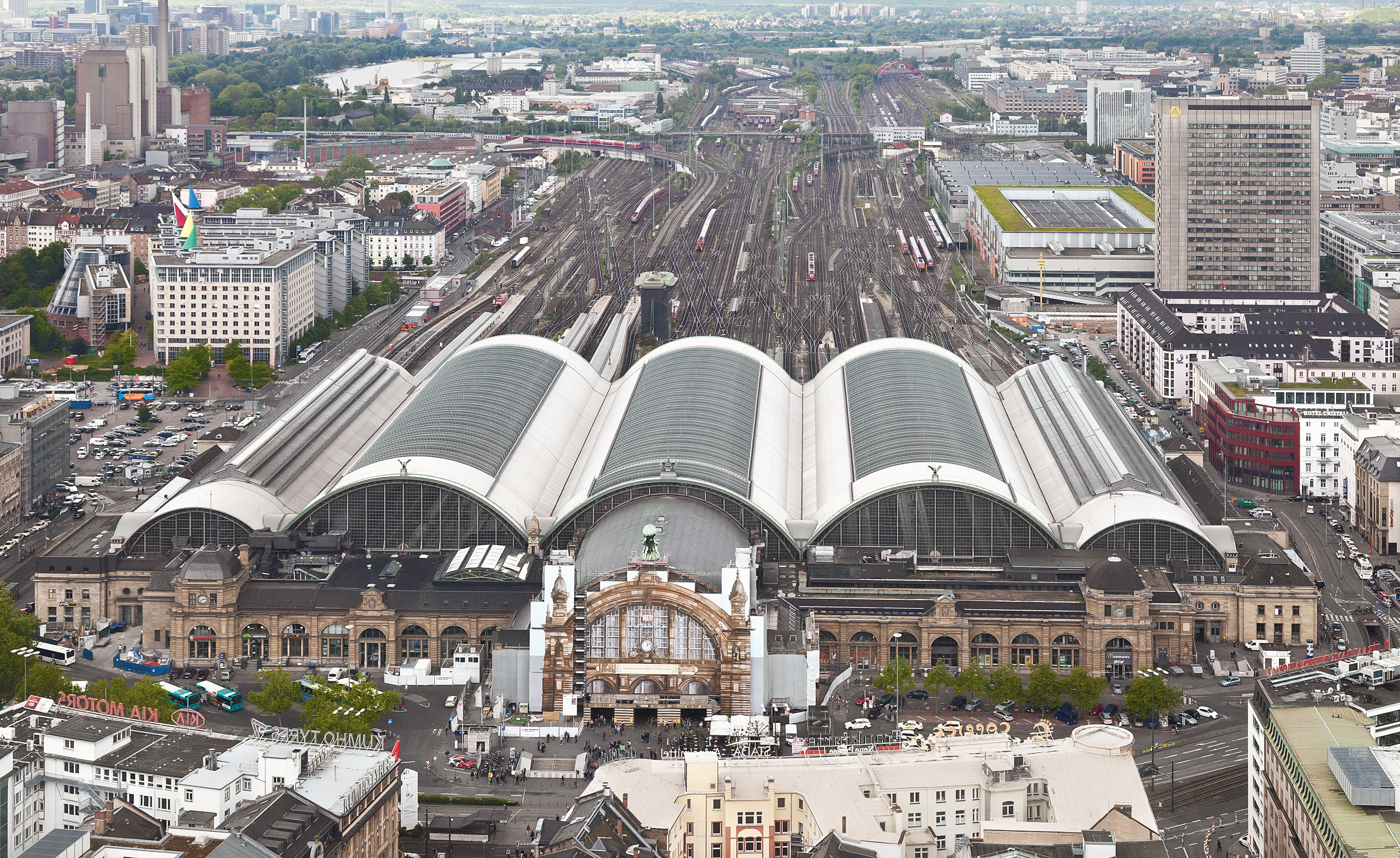
Frankfurt Hauptbahnhof

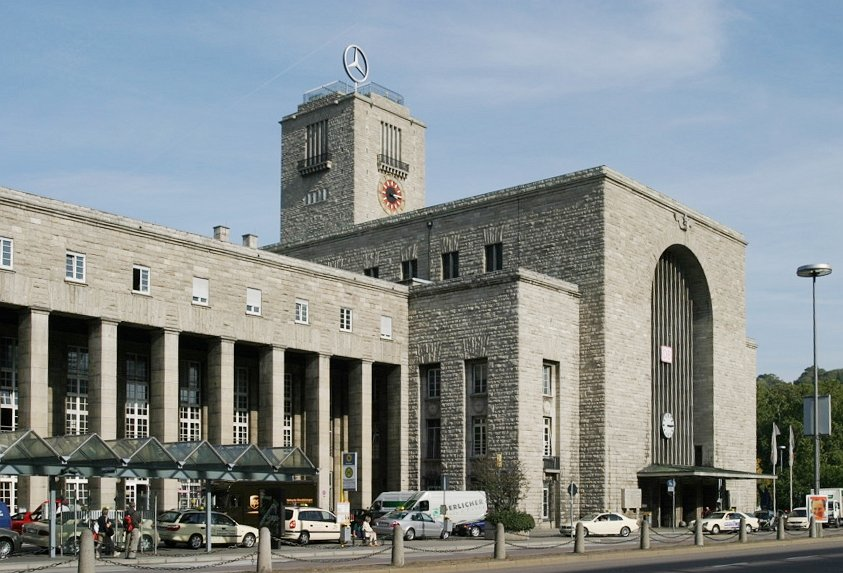
Stuttgart Hauptbahnhof

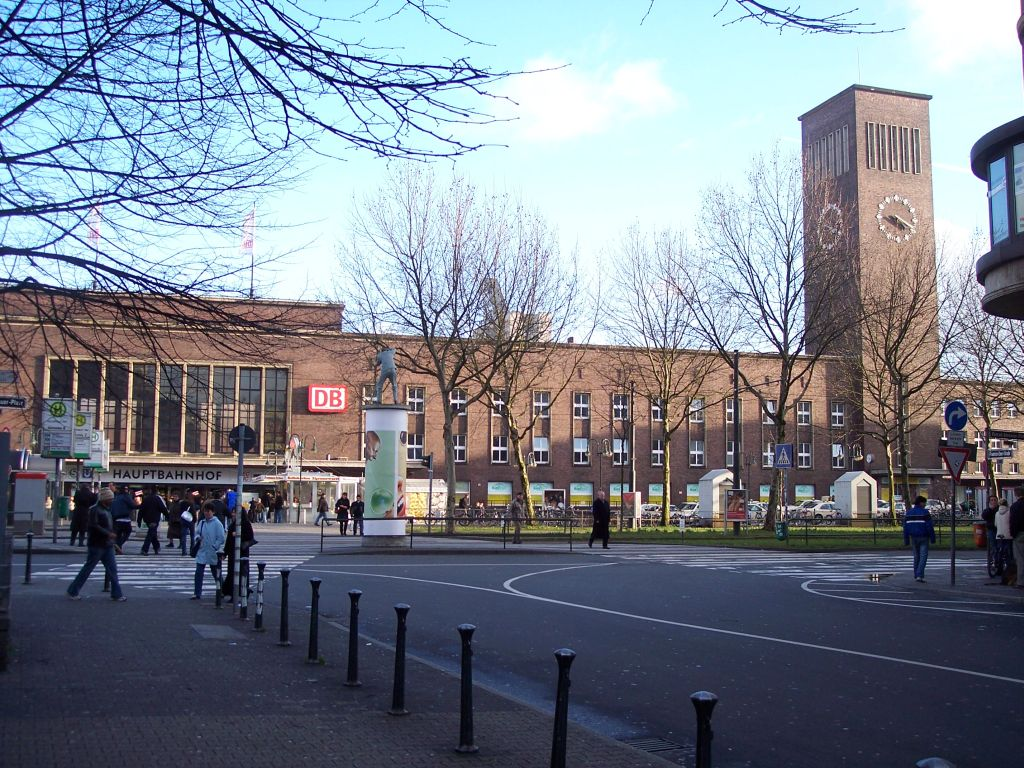
Düsseldorf Hauptbahnhof

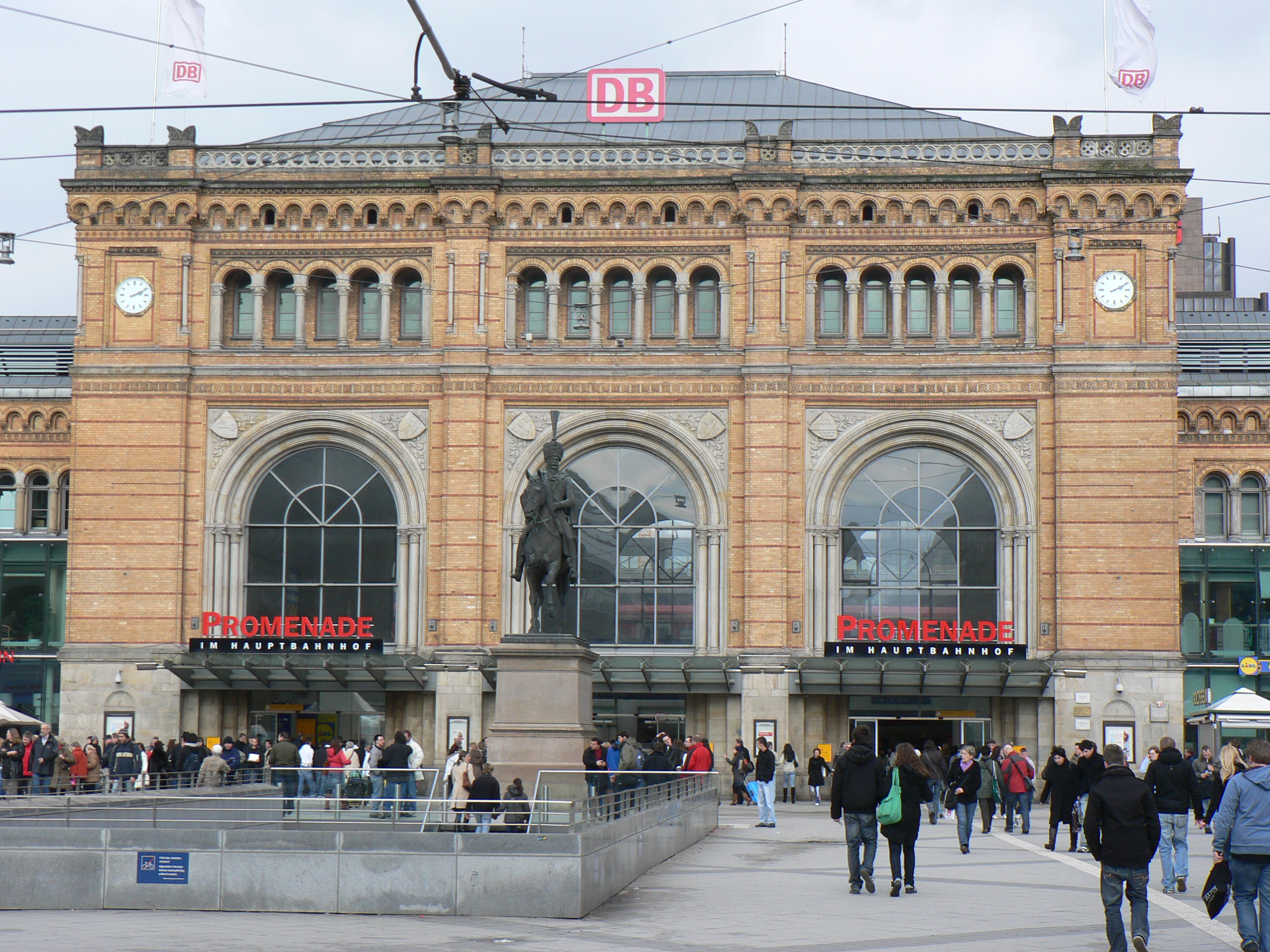
Hanover Hauptbahnhof

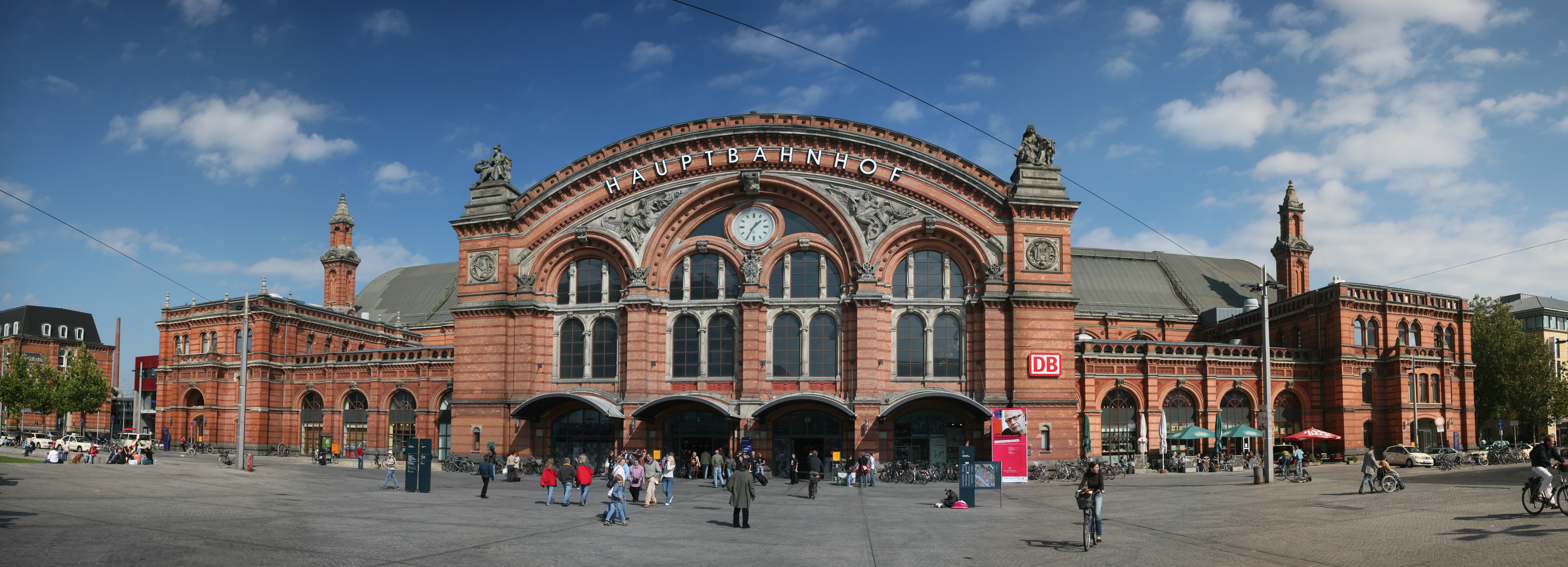
Bremen Hauptbahnhof

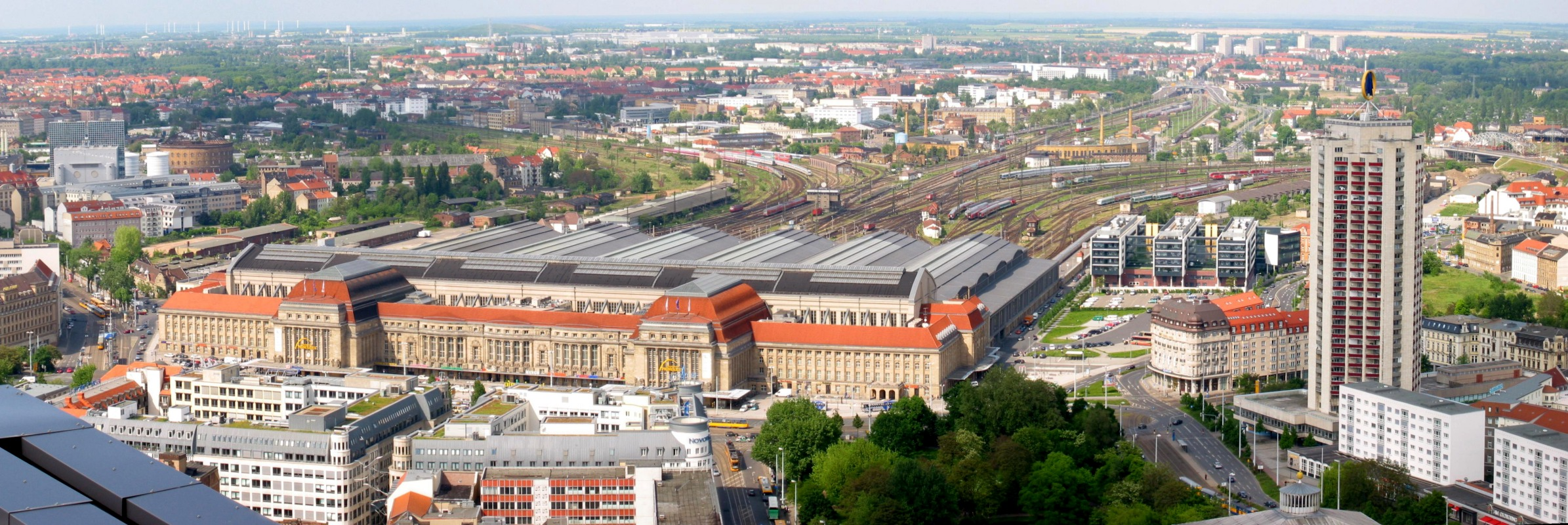
Leipzig Hauptbahnhof

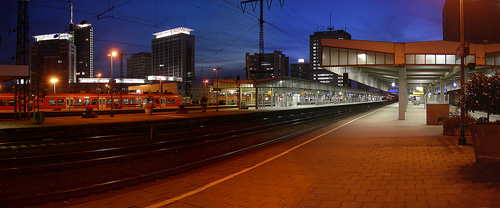
Essen Hauptbahnhof

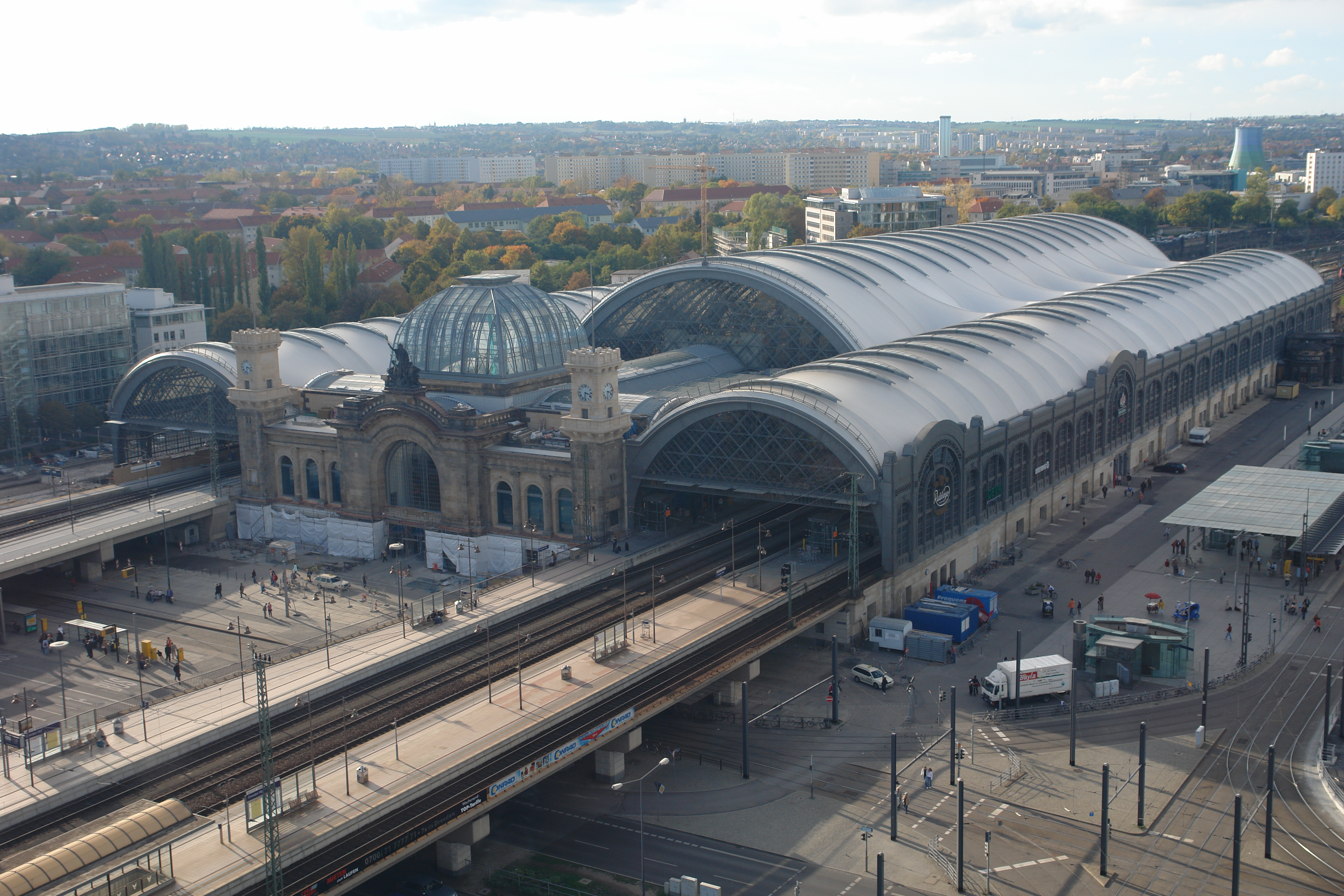
Dresden Hauptbahnhof

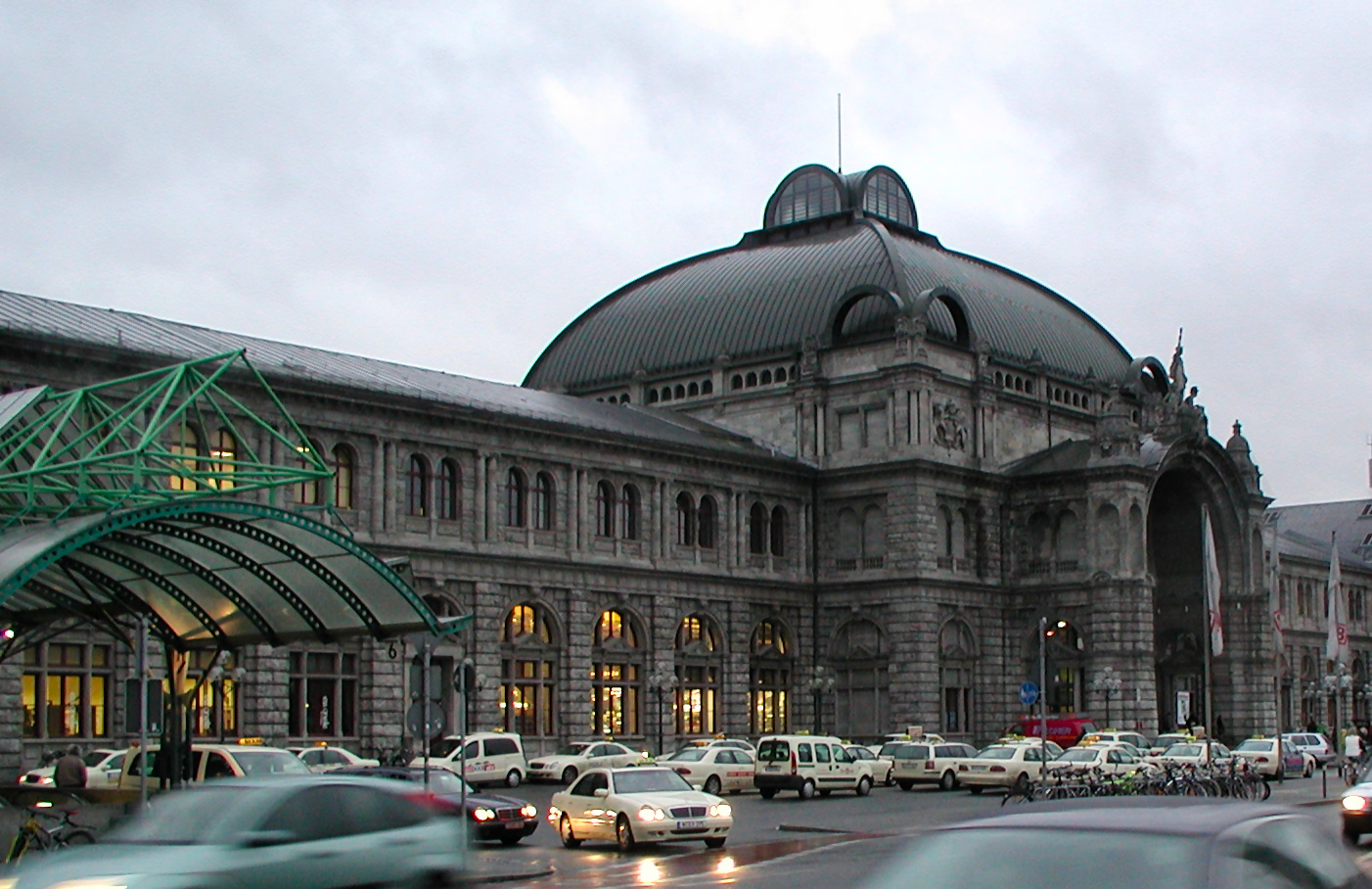
Nuremberg Hauptbahnhof

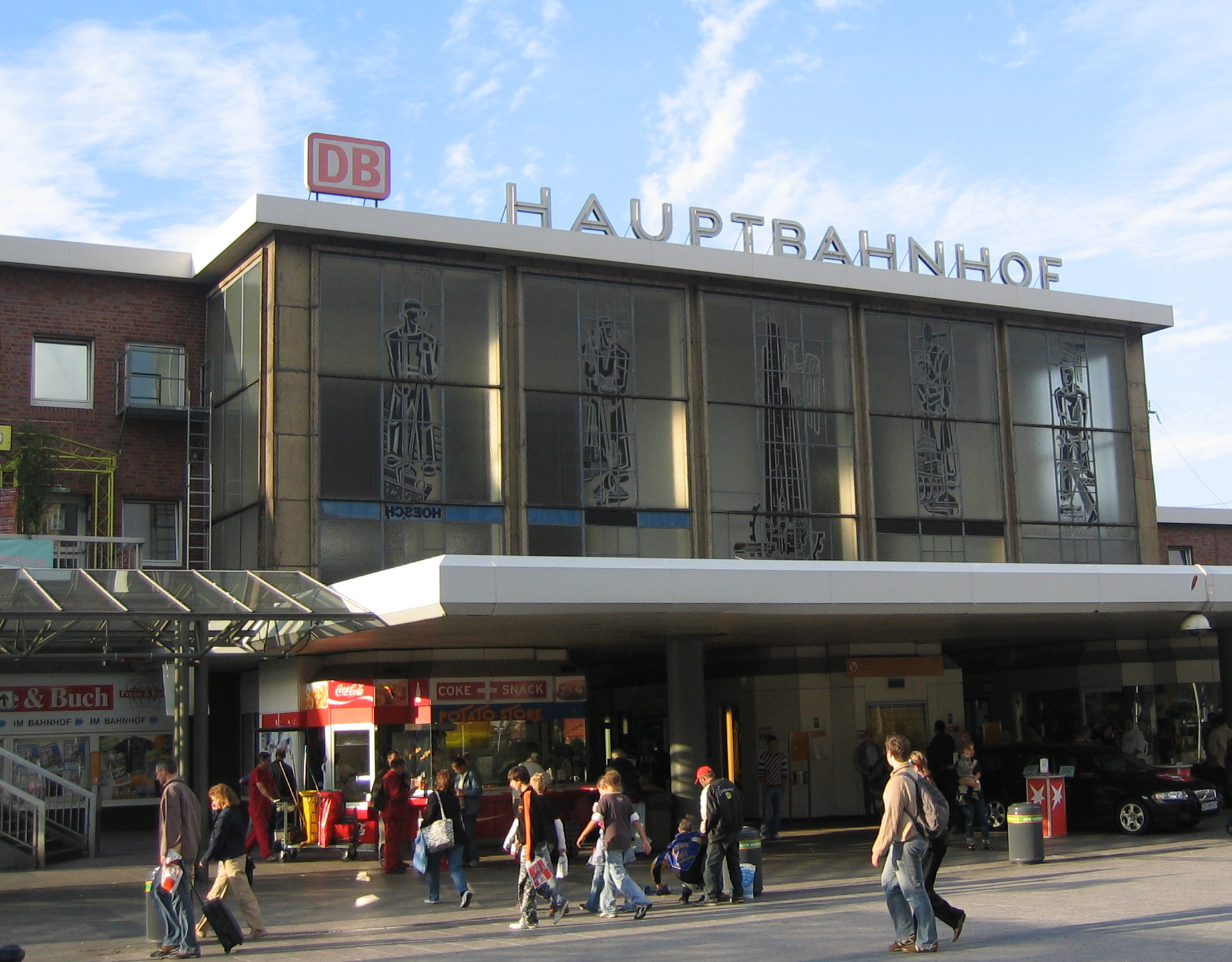
Dortmund Hauptbahnhof

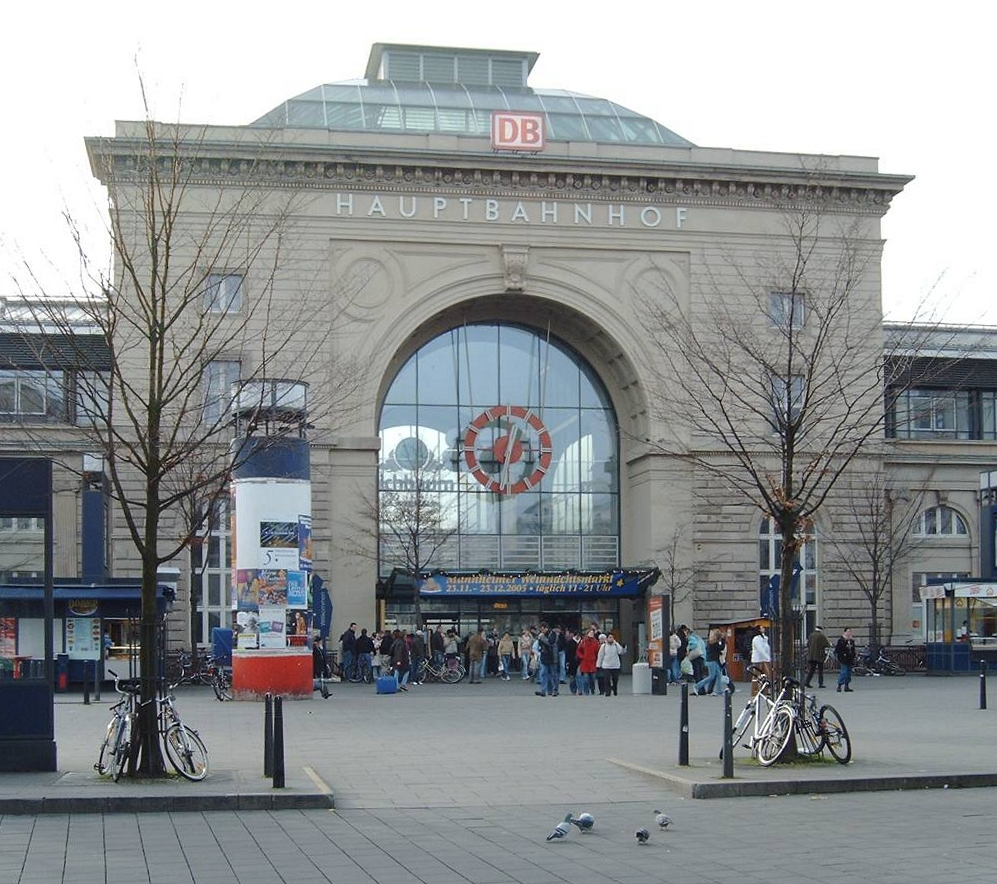
Mannheim Hauptbahnhof

This article shows a list of railway stations in Germany. The list is subdivided per federal state. Due to the number of railway stations it shows a selection of the principal stations and links to related state articles. Where there are 2 or more passenger stations in a large town or city, the most important is often designated by Deutsche Bahn as Hauptbahnhof (German for "central station"), of which there are 122 in total.

== Railway stations ==
=== Baden-Württemberg ===
- Freiburg Hauptbahnhof
- Karlsruhe Hauptbahnhof
- Mannheim Hauptbahnhof
- Stuttgart Hauptbahnhof
- Ulm Hauptbahnhof

=== Bavaria ===
- Augsburg Hauptbahnhof
- Bayreuth Hauptbahnhof
- Fürth Hauptbahnhof
- Ingolstadt Hauptbahnhof
- München Hauptbahnhof
- München Ost
- München-Pasing
- Nürnberg Hauptbahnhof
- Passau Hauptbahnhof
- Regensburg Hauptbahnhof
- Rosenheim
- Würzburg Hauptbahnhof

=== Berlin ===
- Berlin Gesundbrunnen
- Berlin Hauptbahnhof
- Berlin Ostbahnhof
- Berlin-Spandau
- Berlin Südkreuz
- Berlin Zoologischer Garten

=== Brandenburg ===
- Brandenburg Hauptbahnhof
- Cottbus
- Potsdam Hauptbahnhof

=== Bremen ===
- Bremen Hauptbahnhof
- Bremerhaven Hauptbahnhof

=== Hamburg ===
- Hamburg-Altona
- Hamburg Dammtor
- Hamburg-Harburg
- Hamburg Hauptbahnhof

=== Hesse ===
- Darmstadt Hauptbahnhof
- Frankfurt Hauptbahnhof
- Frankfurt Flughafen
- Fulda
- Kassel Hauptbahnhof
- Kassel-Wilhelmshöhe
- Wiesbaden Hauptbahnhof

=== Lower Saxony ===
- Braunschweig Hauptbahnhof
- Göttingen
- Hanover Hauptbahnhof
- Oldenburg Hauptbahnhof
- Osnabrück Hauptbahnhof
- Wolfsburg Hauptbahnhof

=== Mecklenburg-Vorpommern ===
- Greifswald
- Rostock Hauptbahnhof
- Schwerin Hauptbahnhof
- Stralsund
- Wismar

=== North Rhine-Westphalia ===
- Aachen Hauptbahnhof
- Bielefeld Hauptbahnhof
- Bochum Hauptbahnhof
- Bonn Hauptbahnhof
- Cologne Hauptbahnhof
- Cologne/Bonn Airport
- Cologne Deutz
- Dortmund Hauptbahnhof
- Duisburg Hauptbahnhof
- Düsseldorf Hauptbahnhof
- Essen Hauptbahnhof
- Gelsenkirchen Hauptbahnhof
- Hagen Hauptbahnhof
- Mönchengladbach Hauptbahnhof
- Münster Hauptbahnhof
- Neuss Hauptbahnhof
- Oberhausen Hauptbahnhof
- Siegen
- Wuppertal Hauptbahnhof

=== Rhineland-Palatinate ===
- Kaiserslautern Hauptbahnhof
- Koblenz Hauptbahnhof
- Ludwigshafen Hauptbahnhof
- Mainz Hauptbahnhof
- Trier Hauptbahnhof

=== Saarland ===
- Saarbrücken Hauptbahnhof

=== Saxony ===
- Chemnitz Hauptbahnhof
- Döbeln Hauptbahnhof
- Dresden Hauptbahnhof
- Görlitz
- Leipzig Hauptbahnhof
- Meißen
- Plauen (Vogtland) Oberer Bahnhof

=== Saxony-Anhalt ===
- Dessau Hauptbahnhof
- Halle Hauptbahnhof
- Magdeburg Hauptbahnhof

=== Schleswig-Holstein ===
- Kiel Hauptbahnhof
- Lübeck Hauptbahnhof

=== Thuringia ===
- Erfurt Hauptbahnhof
- Gera Hauptbahnhof
- Jena Paradies

== See also ==
- List of busiest railway stations in Germany
- List of railway stations
- Deutsche Bahn
- Rail transport in Germany
- High-speed rail in Germany
- Hauptbahnhof
- Railway lines in Germany
- List of DB station abbreviations
- Railway station types of Germany
- German railway station categories
- List of ICE railway stations
