= Könnern station =

Railway station in Könnern, Germany

Könnern
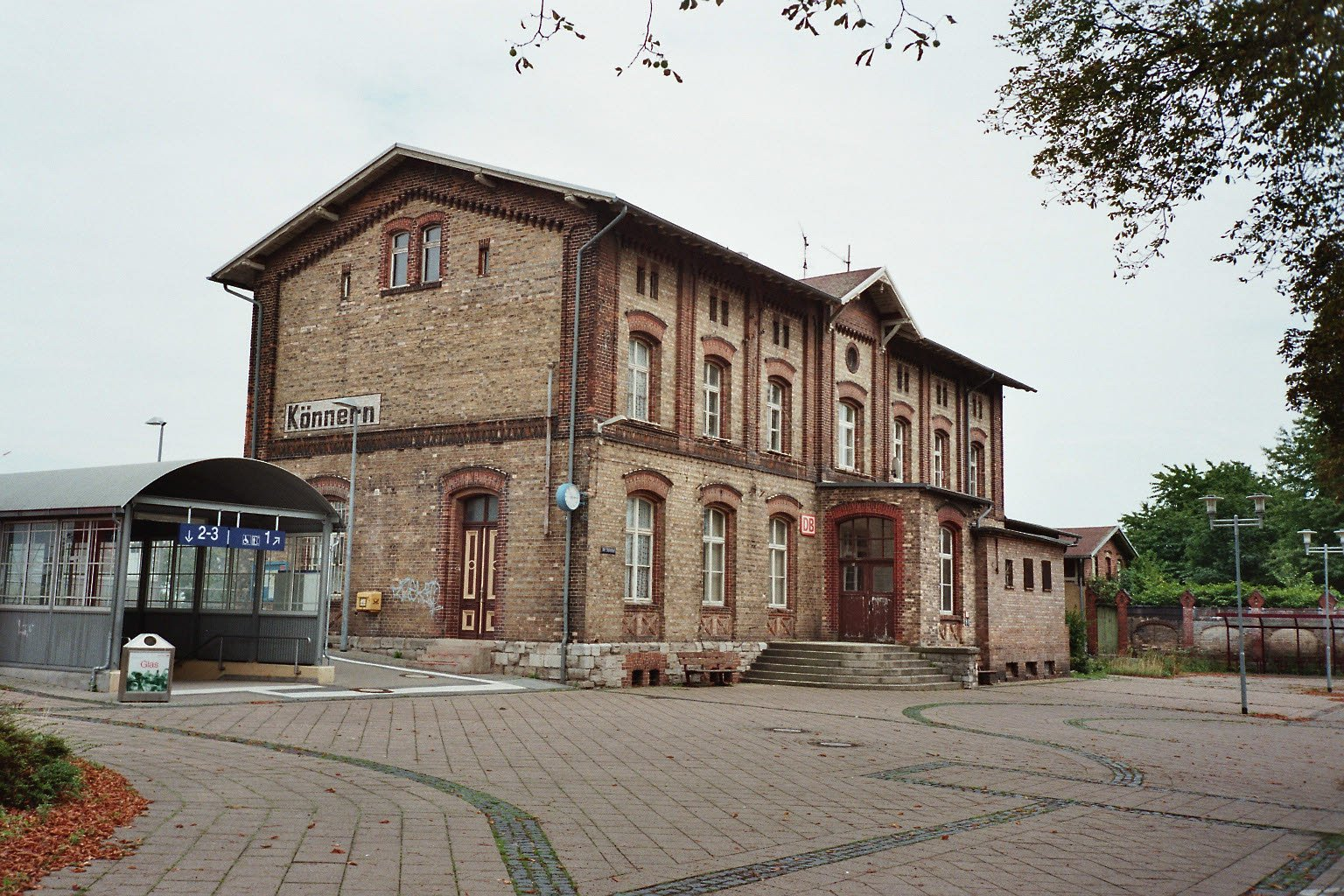
- Entrance building in 2006

General information
- Location: Am Bahnhof 1, Könnern, Saxony-Anhalt; Germany
- Coordinates: 51°40′27″N 11°46′48″E
- Owner: Deutsche Bahn
- Operator: DB Netz; DB Station&Service
- Lines: Halle–Vienenburg km 28.5; Könnern–Baalberge km 0.0; Könnern–Rothenburg km 0.0
- Platforms: 3

Construction
- Accessible: Yes

Other information
- Station code: 3362
- DS100 code: LKO
- IBNR: 8013140
- Category: 5
- Fare zone: marego: 660; MDV: 279 (rail only)
- Website: www.bahnhof.de

History
- Opened: 15 October 1871

Services
Preceding station	Abellio Rail Mitteldeutschland	Following station
Belleben towards Goslar	RE 4	Halle (Saale) Hbf Terminus
Belleben towards Halberstadt	RE 24	Halle (Saale) Hbf Terminus
Baalberge towards Magdeburg Hbf	RB 47	Domnitz (Saalkr) towards Halle (Saale) Hbf
Location

Könnern station (German: Bahnhof Könnern) is the station of Könnern in Salzlandkreis in the German state of Saxony-Anhalt. It is a junction station with two branch lines and was opened in 1871.

== Location ==
Könnern station is located at line kilometre 28.5 of the Halle–Vienenburg railway, measured from Halle. In addition, it is still the starting point of a line to Baalberge and one to Rothenburg.

It is located on the northeastern edge of the town and is thus about 750 metres from the centre. The streets of Am Güterbahnhof and Am Bahnhof are immediately adjacent. State road 144, also called Köthener Straße (Köthen road), crosses a level crossing next to the station.

The next stop towards Halle is the halt (Haltepunkt) of Domnitz, which is about six kilometres away. The next stop towards Vienenburg is the halt of Belleben (10 km away) and towards Baalberge, it is the halt of Trebitz (4 km). The line to Rothenburg, which is only used for freight, is about five kilometres long.

== History ==
The station was opened with the line to Aschersleben on 15 October 1871. Könnern was a terminus for a time. From the beginning it had a large entrance building and on the side opposite the station there was a goods shed and a loading road with head and side ramps. On the opening day, celebrations took place early in the morning. The first train arrived at Könnern station at 5:15 in the morning in presence of many citizens. After the train left at 13:00, celebrations continued at the station restaurant.

After the line had been completed to Halle, the number of travellers increased significantly. The local industrial and agricultural sectors also made used of the railway for freight transport. New companies were established as a result. In freight transport, inbound freight was mainly made up of animals, grain, lignite, briquettes and sugar. The outgoing freight included stones, cement, mechanical engineering products and steam boilers. The express goods handling area was located behind the entrance building. With the commissioning of the line to Baalberge, which connects to Bernburg, the traffic increased again. The line to Rothenburg was opened in 1916. This officially begins only in the northern part of the station, which was called Könnern Anschlußbf (connection station) or after 1944 at times also Könnern Nord (north).

The official spelling of the town's name was Cönnern until 14 October 1911. Subsequently, the spelling was changed to Könnern.

With the further increase of the goods traffic, more shunting was required. Since there was no hump, shunting could only be performed by pushing wagons. Due to the long periods with closed barriers at the level crossing, there were traffic obstructions on Köthener Straße. The railway division (Königliche Eisenbahn-Direktion) in Magdeburg proposed building an underpass for this reason. The town council of Könnern rejected this, however, on cost grounds.

After the founding of Deutsche Reichsbahn, several suggestions for improving the operation came up. Among other things, it was planned to build a turntable with a diameter of 16 metres and a discharge pit. Neither project was realised.

Almost all freight operations were carried out on the loading road, which was extended around 1895, and the head and side ramps in front of the goods shed. A siding branched off to run down the middle of the street, which was served by locomotives of the state railway. A maltings had been connected via a siding since its opening in 1872. This existed until the beginning of the 1990s. In the 1980s, a Deutz locomotive was used there. It was delivered to the Könnern maltings on 21 November 1928 and is now privately owned.

There was a sugar factory on the line to Rothenburg from 1850 to 1928. It had its own siding and was served by locomotives of the state railway. The connection still exists, but is unused. In 1991, a concentrated feed mixer was built here.

After the Second World War, the second track on the line between Halle and Aschersleben was dismantled for reparations to the Soviet Union. The single track had no major impact on shunting operations in Könnern, as the volume of goods was already declining.

Extensive rebuilding was carried in the station in 1999. The two platforms with three platform tracks were renewed. Two lifts were built to provide disabled access. All commercial facilities were already closed at that time. The shunting of freight traffic still takes place, but freight is no longer loaded or unloaded at Könnern station.

=== Shunting ===
It is likely that locomotives were never stationed in Könnern. Locomotives from Bernburg were used; these hauled a local goods train to Könnern twice a day. Locomotives from Güsten or Aschersleben were used at times. The situation changed after 1991. The Bernburg locomotive depot (Bw Bernburg) had already been closed. The Güsten locomotive depot (Bw Güsten) was also close to closing. Locomotives from Halle were used for shunting, which had meanwhile become much less frequent.

== Infrastructure ==
The entrance building is heritage-listed.

The side platform (1) is 140 metres long. The tracks on the island platform (2 and 3) have usable lengths of 140 metres on track 2 and 166 metres on track 3. The height of all platforms is 76 centimetres.

== Transport services ==
Currently (2025) Könnern station is served by the following regional services:

Line	Route	Interval (mins)
RE 4	Halle – Könnern – Aschersleben – Halberstadt – Wernigerode – Goslar	120
RE 24	Halle – Könnern – Aschersleben – Halberstadt	120
RB 47	Halle – Halle-Trotha – Könnern (– Baalberge – Bernburg – Calbe Ost)	60 (120)

The station is served by buses, which run from the centre of Könnern to Bernburg, Alsleben and Halle among others.
