= Munich Isartor station =

Munich S-Bahn station

München Isartor
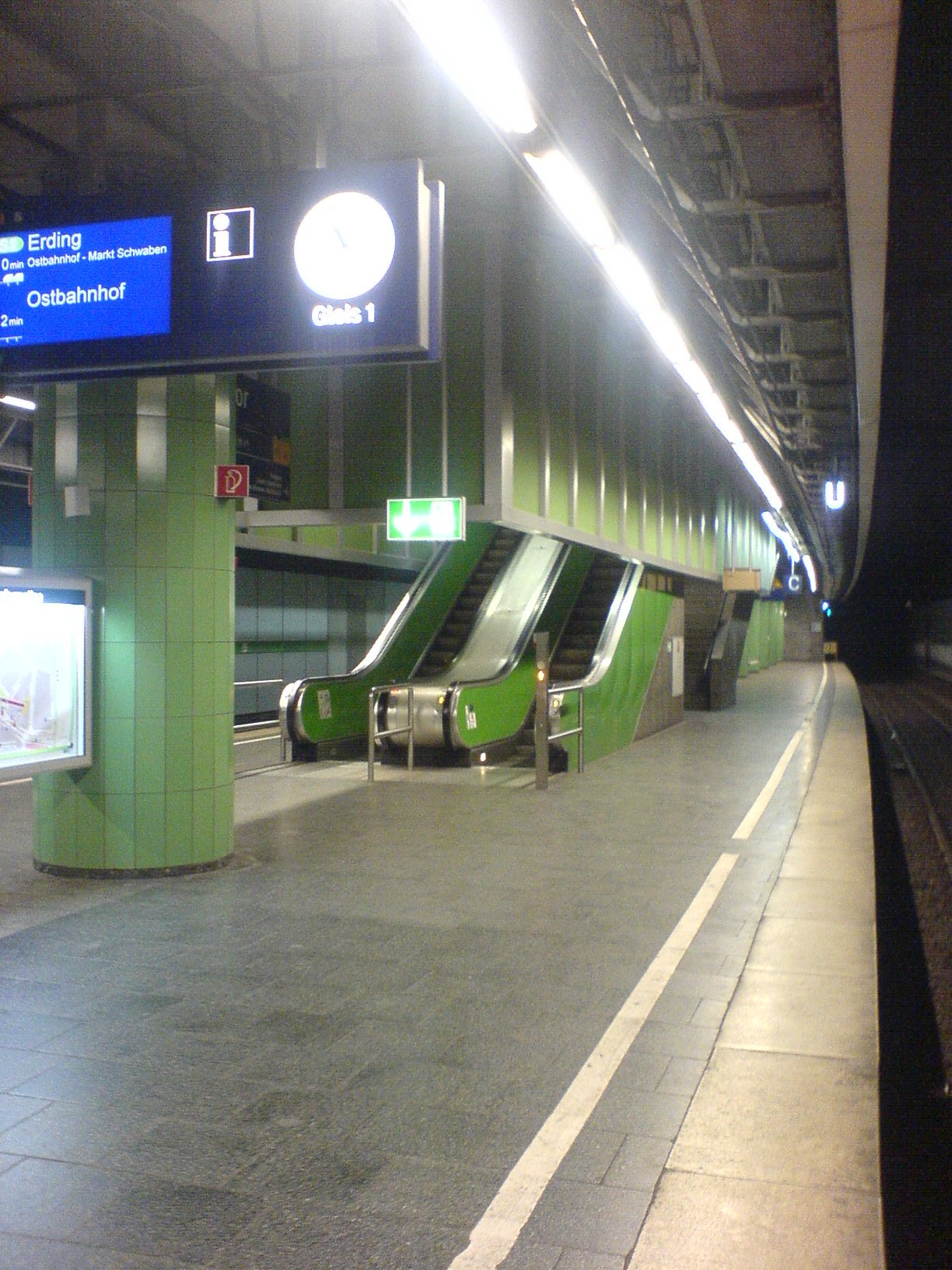

General information
- Location: Munich, Bavaria; Germany
- Coordinates: 48°08′06″N 11°34′55″E
- Lines: S-Bahn trunk line (KBS 999)
- Platforms: 1 island platform
- Tracks: 2
- Train operators: S-Bahn München
- Connections: 132

Construction
- Parking: no
- Cycle facilities: yes
- Accessible: Yes

Other information
- Station code: 4236
- DS100 code: MIS
- IBNR: 8004131
- Category: 4
- Fare zone: : M
- Website: stationsdatenbank.de; www.bahnhof.de

History
- Opened: 1972

Passengers
- 45,900 daily

Services
Preceding station	Munich S-Bahn	Following station
Marienplatz towards Freising or Flughafen	S1	Rosenheimer Platz towards Leuchtenbergring
Marienplatz towards Petershausen or Altomünster	S2	Rosenheimer Platz towards Erding
Marienplatz towards Mammendorf	S3	Rosenheimer Platz towards Holzkirchen
Marienplatz towards Geltendorf	S4	Rosenheimer Platz towards Ebersberg
Marienplatz towards Weßling	S5	Rosenheimer Platz towards Kreuzstraße
Marienplatz towards Tutzing	S6	Rosenheimer Platz towards Ebersberg
Marienplatz towards Herrsching	S8	Rosenheimer Platz towards Flughafen
Location

Munich Isartor station is a station opened in 1972 on the Munich S-Bahn on the trunk line between Munich Central Station (German: Hauptbahnhof) and Munich East station (Ostbahnhof). It is located below Isartorplatz and the Thierschstraße/Zweibrückenstraße intersection in Munich and is named after the nearby Isartor city gate. It is classified by Deutsche Bahn as a category 4 station.

Like all other stations on the trunk line, it has two entrances. The Western entrance leads to a vast mezzanine on the Altstadtring/Tal/Zweibrückenstraße intersection and the eastern entrance starts at the courtyard of the Breiterhof shopping arcade between Thierschstraße and Liebherrstraße.

Because the S-Bahn trunk line passes under the Isar between the stations of Isartor and Rosenheimerplatz just to the east of the station, both tubes are fitted with flood gates so that the tunnel can be sealed watertight, so that in the event of flooding of the Isar the stations lying to the west are not also flooded. There is no similar construction on the eastern side of the Isar because Rosenheimer Platz station is substantially higher than the Isar.

During the tunneling, the approximately 2,000 ton Isartor tower had to be supported by elaborate scaffolding in order to protect the site and the tower.

The station is one of the five underground stations of the S-Bahn trunk line that were built between 1966 and 1972. Unlike the other four, München Isartor is not a Haltepunkt ("halt point", defined as having no sets of points), because it has four sets of points. These allow trains towards Munich East station and trains towards Donnersbergerbrücke to change between track 2 and track 1. Like Rosenheimerplatz station, Isartor station is a purely S-Bahn station without connection to the U-Bahn or long-distance services. Transfer facilities exist to tram lines 16 and 18 and to the bus route 132. In 2007, the station was used daily (Mon-Fri) by 45,900 passengers, entering, exiting and transferring. The platform is 210 metres long and 96 cm high. It is one of only two stations with their island platforms not arranged in Spanish solution, the other one is München Rosenheimer Platz.

== Notable places nearby ==
- Deutsches Museum
- German Patent and Trademark Office
