= Munich Rosenheimer Platz station =

Munich S-Bahn station

München Rosenheimer Platz
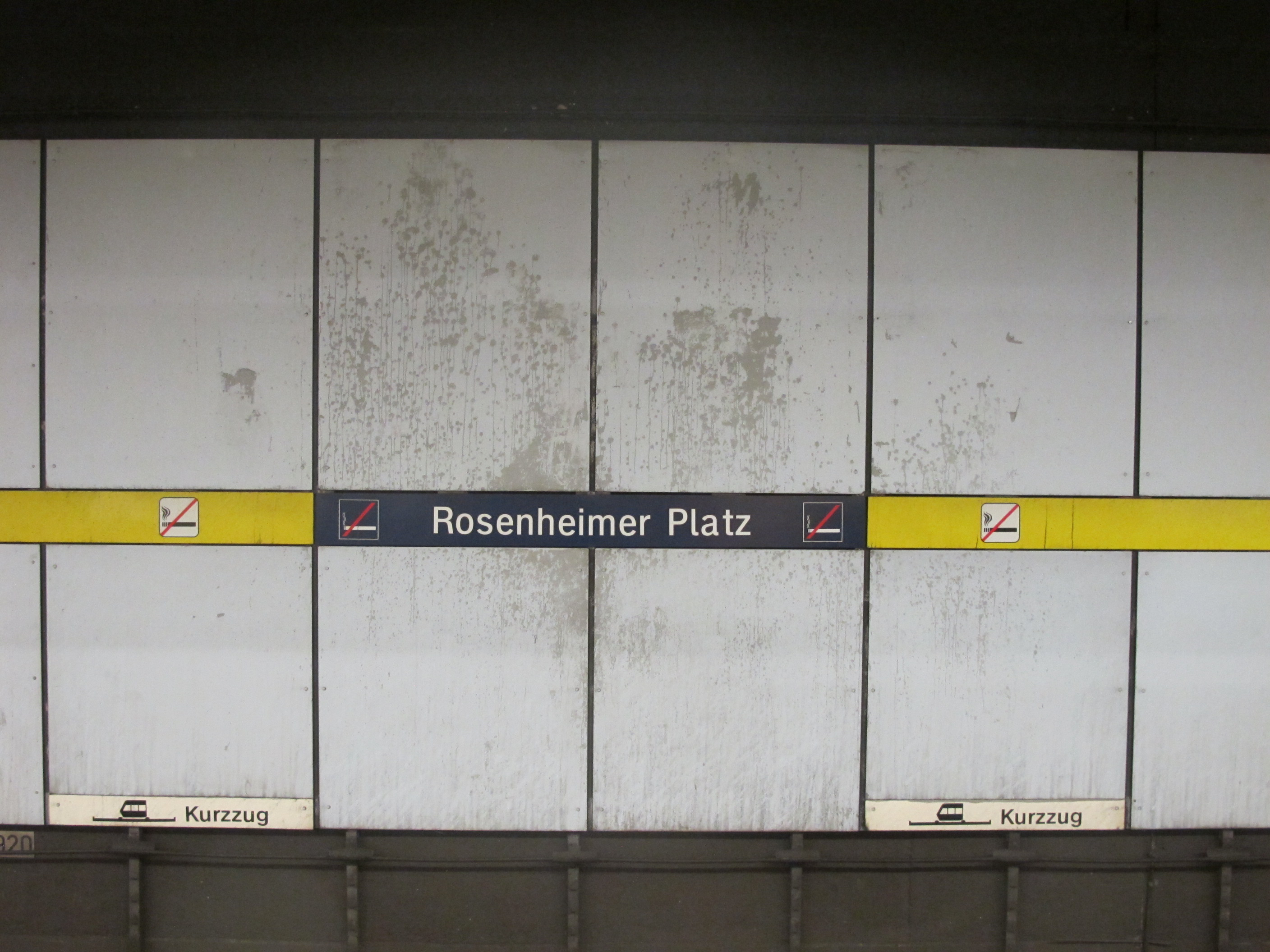
- 2015

General information
- Location: Munich, Bavaria; Germany
- Coordinates: 48°07′43″N 11°35′38″E
- Lines: S-Bahn trunk line (KBS 999)
- Platforms: 1 island platform
- Tracks: 2
- Train operators: S-Bahn München
- Connections: E7

Construction
- Accessible: Yes

Other information
- Station code: 4242
- DS100 code: MRP
- Category: 4
- Fare zone: : M
- Website: stationsdatenbank.de; www.bahnhof.de

History
- Opened: 1972

Passengers
- 55,600 daily

Services
Preceding station	Munich S-Bahn	Following station
Isartor towards Freising or Flughafen	S1	Munich East towards Leuchtenbergring
Isartor towards Petershausen or Altomünster	S2	Munich East towards Erding
Isartor towards Mammendorf	S3	Munich East towards Holzkirchen
Isartor towards Geltendorf	S4	Munich East towards Ebersberg
Isartor towards Weßling	S5	Munich East towards Kreuzstraße
Isartor towards Tutzing	S6	Munich East towards Ebersberg
Isartor towards Herrsching	S8	Munich East towards Flughafen
Location

Munich Rosenheimer Platz station is one of the five underground stations opened in 1972 on the trunk line of the Munich S-Bahn between Munich Central Station (German: Hauptbahnhof) and Munich East station (München Ost station). It is under the street of the same name and Rosenheimerstraße in the Munich district of Haidhausen. It has two platform tracks and is classified by Deutsche Bahn as a category 4 station.

== Description ==
The station was opened with the other underground stations on the trunk line in 1972; construction started in 1966. The escalators, columns and the station stripes are in yellow, as part of the station's colour scheme. Like its northwestern neighbor, Isartor station, the station has no connection to the U-Bahn or long-distance services, but only with trams. In 2007, station was used daily (Mon-Fri) by 55,600 passengers, entering, exiting and transferring.

The two entrances from the platform each lead to a mezzanine floor. The northwestern exit leads to both sides of Rosenheimerstraße and the southeastern exit leads to Rosenheimerplatz. The mezzanine also includes a direct elevator link to the nearby Hilton hotel.

Around the northwestern exit are the cultural centre of Gasteig with concert halls, the Münchner Volkshochschule (adult education) and the central office of the Munich City Library (Münchner Stadtbibliothek). Because of the proximity to the concert halls, special soundproofing measures were carried out on the tracks during the construction of the cultural centre.

The station is served by routes and of the Munich tramway. The linking of tram line 25 between Max-Weber-Platz and Grünwald via the S-Bahn trunk line was an important argument for the construction of the eastern tram bypass, which was taken into operation on 8 November 1997.

The platform is 210 metres long and 96 cm high.

== Notable places nearby ==
- Gasteig
