= Trams in Halle =

Coordinates: 51°28′58″N 11°58′11″E

Halle (Saale) tramway network
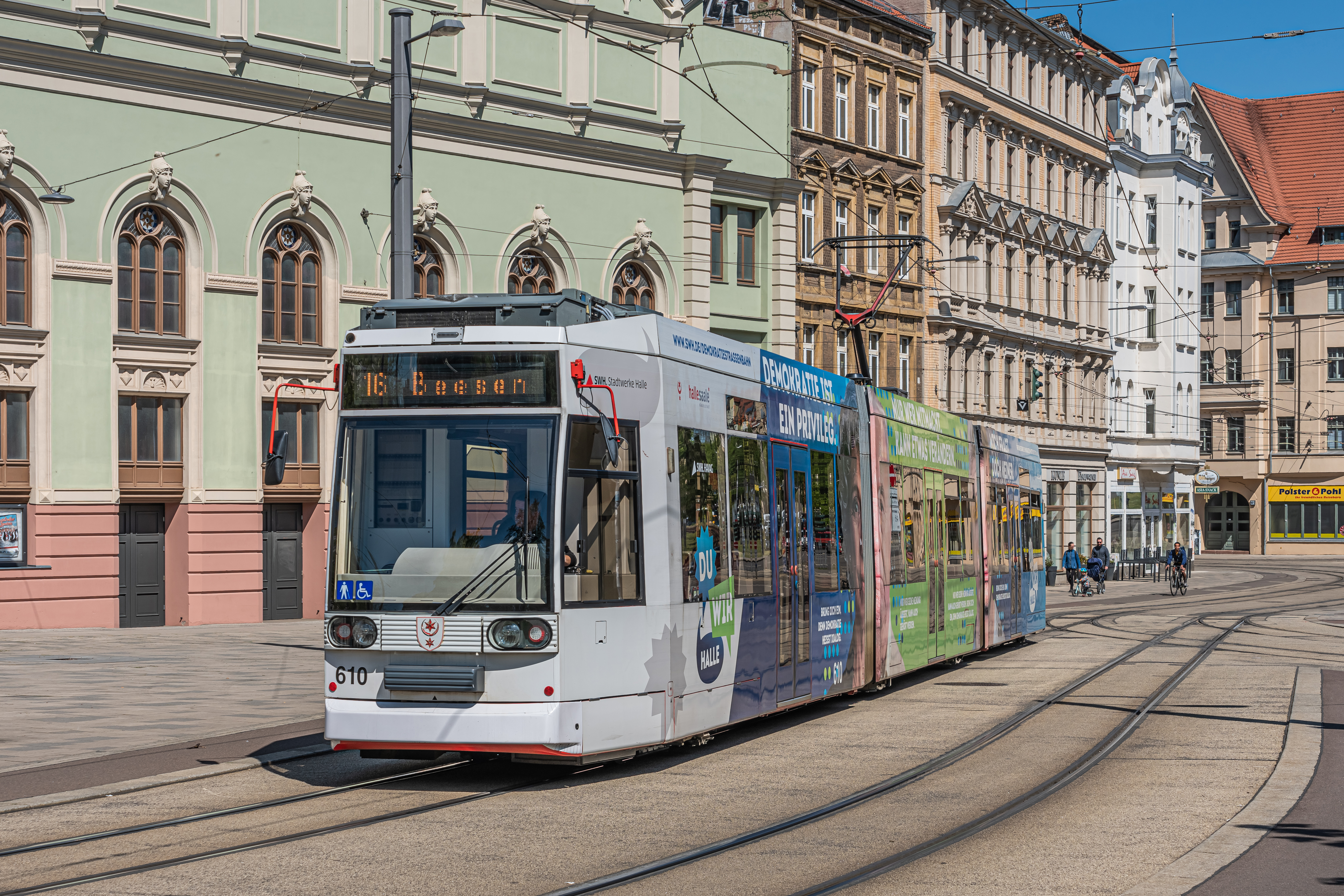
- A tram on line 16 at Steintor

Operation
- Locale: Halle (Saale), Saxony-Anhalt, Germany

Statistics
Horsecar era: 1882–1899
- Status: Converted to electricity
- Track gauge: 1,000 mm (3 ft 3 3/8 in)
- Propulsion system: Horses
Electric tram era: since 1891
- Status: Operational
- Lines: 12
- Operator: Hallesche Verkehrs-AG (HAVAG)
- Track gauge: 1,000 mm (3 ft 3 3/8 in)
- Propulsion system: Electricity
- Electrification: 750 V DC
- Route length: 87.6 km (54.4 mi) (2012)
- Halle (Saale) tramway network.
- Website: Hallesche Verkehrs-AG (HAVAG) (in German)

The Halle (Saale) tramway network (German: Straßenbahnnetz Halle (Saale)) is a network of tramways forming part of the public transport system in Halle (Saale), a city in the federal state of Saxony-Anhalt, Germany.

Opened in 1882, the network has been operated since 1990 by Hallesche Verkehrs-AG (HAVAG), and is integrated in the Mitteldeutscher Verkehrsverbund (MDV).

== Network ==
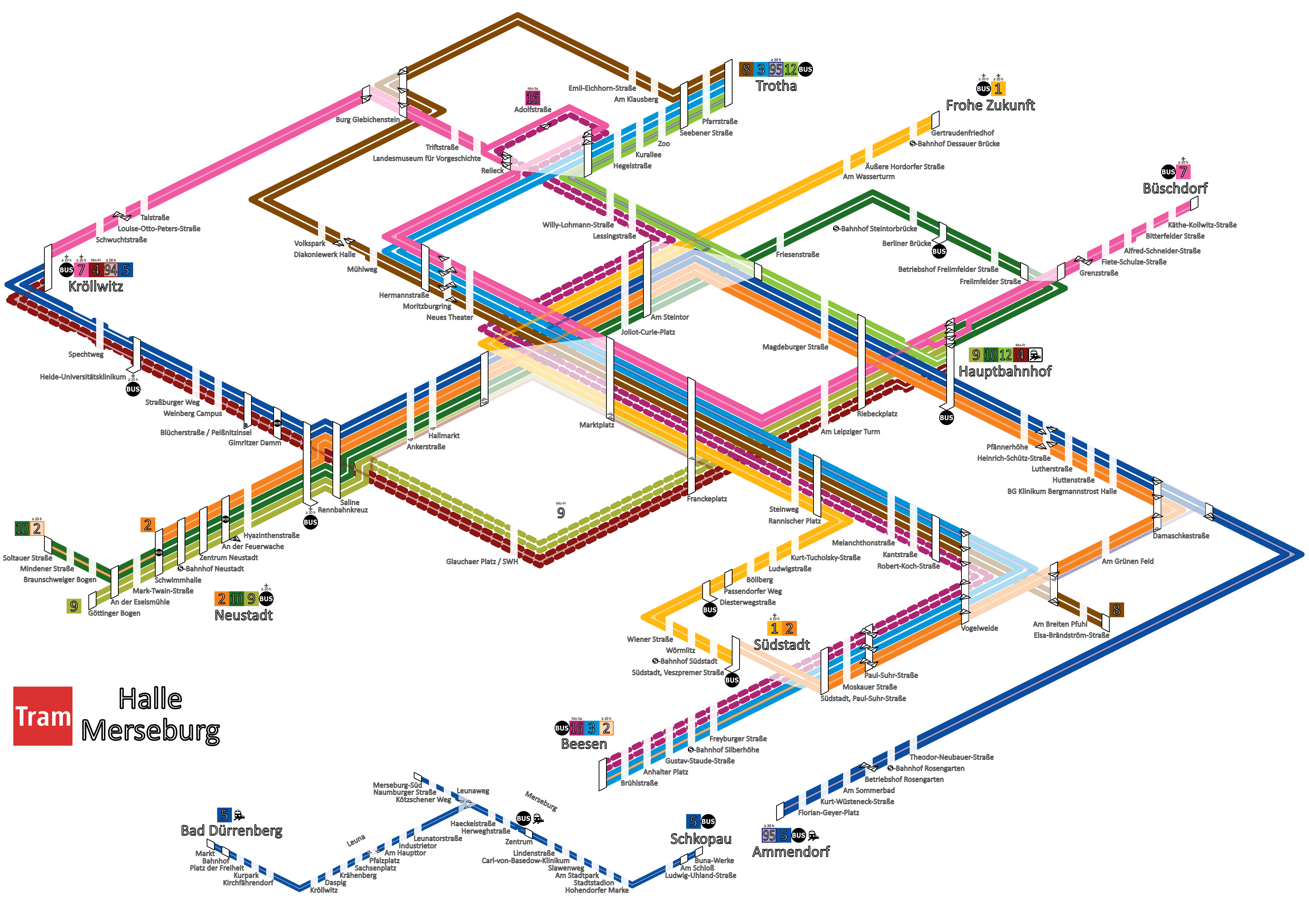
(2026)

Line	Route
1 day-time	Frohe Zukunft / / Gertraudenfriedhof – Am Steintor – Marktplatz – Böllberg - Südstadt, Veszpremer Straße
2 day-time	Schwimmhalle - S-Bahnhof Neustadt – Rennbahnkreuz – Marktplatz – Am Steintor – central station – Damaschkestraße – Vogelweide - Südstadt, Veszpremer Straße
3 day-time	Trotha - Zoo – Reileck – Moritzburgring - Marktplatz – Franckeplatz – Vogelweide - Südstadt, Paul-Suhr-Straße - Beesen
4 Mo-Fr	Kröllwitz - Heide-Universitätsklinikum – Rennbahnkreuz – Glauchaer Platz – Franckeplatz – Riebeckplatz - central station (continue 12)
5 day-time	Kröllwitz - Heide-Universitätsklinikum – Rennbahnkreuz – Marktplatz – Am Steintor – central station – Damaschkestraße – Ammendorf / / Schkopau – Merseburg – (< this direction Merseburg-Süd <) – Leuna - Bad Dürrenberg
7 day-time	Kröllwitz - Burg Giebichenstein – Reileck – Moritzburgring - Marktplatz – Franckeplatz – central station - Büschdorf
8 day-time	Trotha - Burg Giebichenstein – Volkspark – Marktplatz – Vogelweide - Elsa-Brändström-Straße
9 day-time	Göttinger Bogen - S-Bahnhof Neustadt – Rennbahnkreuz – (Marktplatz / Mo-Fr Glauchaer Platz) – Franckeplatz - central station (continue 10)
10 day-time	Soltauer Straße - S-Bahnhof Neustadt – Rennbahnkreuz – Marktplatz – Am Steintor – Berliner Brücke - central station (continue 9)
12 day-time	Trotha - Zoo – Reileck – Am Steintor - central station
16 Mo-Sa	Adolfstraße - Reileck - Am Steintor – Marktplatz – Franckeplatz – Südstadt - Beesen
127 late	as above, 2 extended: Soltauer Straße - Beesen
94 late	this direction: Kröllwitz > Heide-Universitätsklinikum > Rennbahnkreuz > Hallmarkt > Marktplatz > Glauchaer Platz > Rennbahnkreuz > Heide-Universitätsklinikum > Kröllwitz
95 late	Trotha - Zoo – Reileck – Am Steintor – Marktplatz – Vogelweide – Damaschkestraße - Ammendorf

(As of 6 February 2026)

== Rolling stock ==
Present

Image	Class	Years in Production	Quantity	Notes	Lines of Use
	MGT6D	1996–2001	60	Low Floor, 3 car bodies, Bi-directional	Day: Lines 1, 2, 2S, 4, 7, 8, 9, 10, 12 & 15; LUNA-Nachtlinie: Lines 1, 2, 2S, 5, 7, 8, 94 & 95
	MGT-K	2004–2005	30	Low Floor, 2 car bodies	Lines 2, 3, 4 (Mo-Fr) & 5
	MGT-K-2	2012–2013	12	Low Floor, 2 car bodies	Lines 2, 3, 4 (Mo-Fr) & 5
	MGT-M	2025	39	Low Floor, 3 car bodies	–
	MGT-XL	2024	17	Low Floor, 5 car bodies	–

Former

Image	Class	Years in Production	Quantity	Notes	Lines of Use
	Tatra T4D-C	1981–1986	51	Motor units	–
	Tatra B4D-C	1981–1986	17	Trailer units	–

== See also ==
- List of town tramway systems in Germany
- Trams in Germany
