= Kanonenbahn =

Railway line

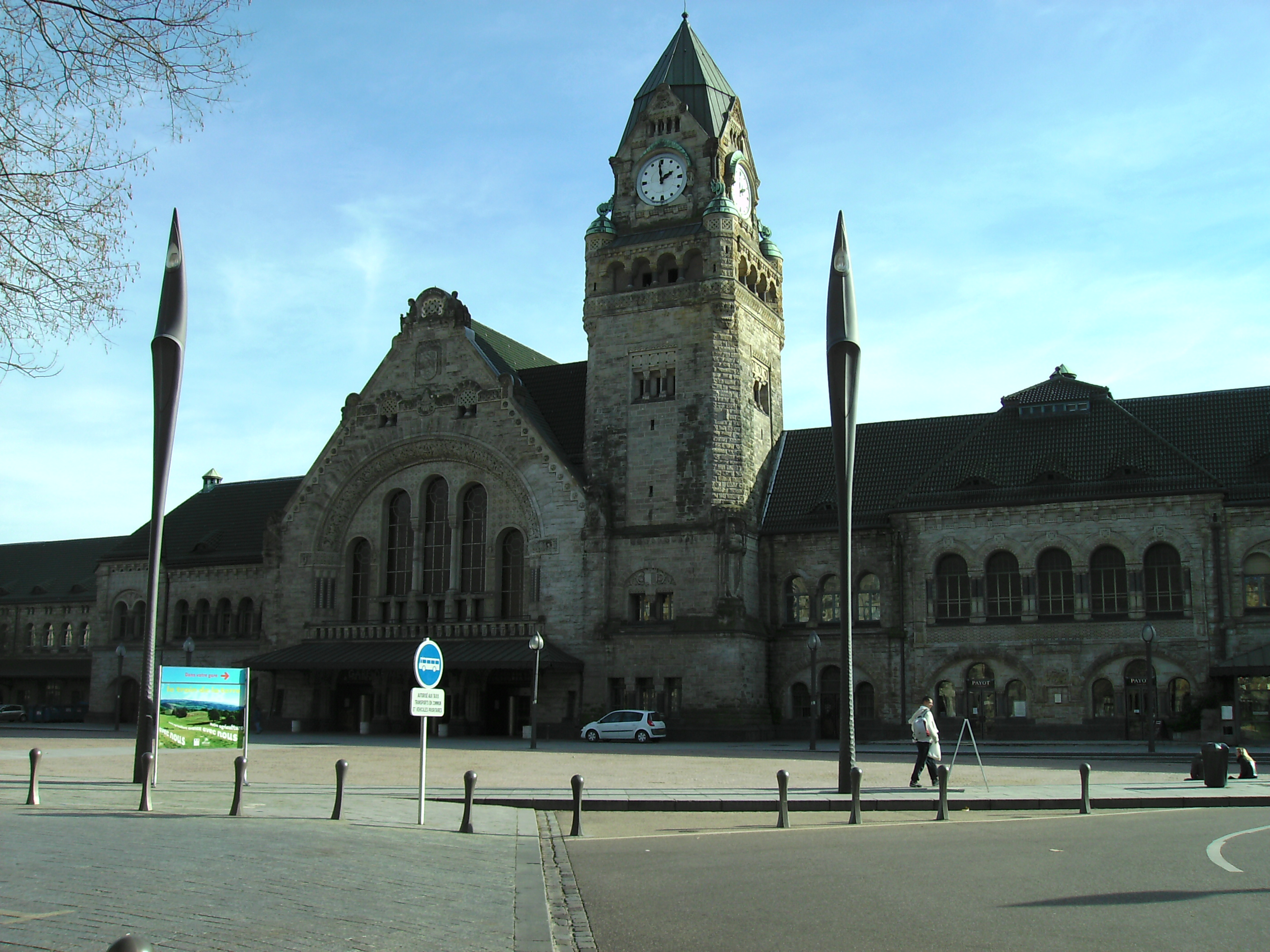
The railway station of Metz was connected to the Kanonenbahn.

The Kanonenbahn (literally "Cannons Railway") is a former German military strategic railway between Berlin and Metz via Güsten, Wetzlar, Koblenz and Trier. Metz is in Alsace-Lorraine, which was annexed by Germany after the Franco-Prussian War.

Other railways, such as the Glan Valley Railway (Glantalbahn), built mainly for military strategic reasons, were also colloquially known as the Kanonenbahn, but the link between Berlin and Metz is the best known of them.

== Derivation of name ==
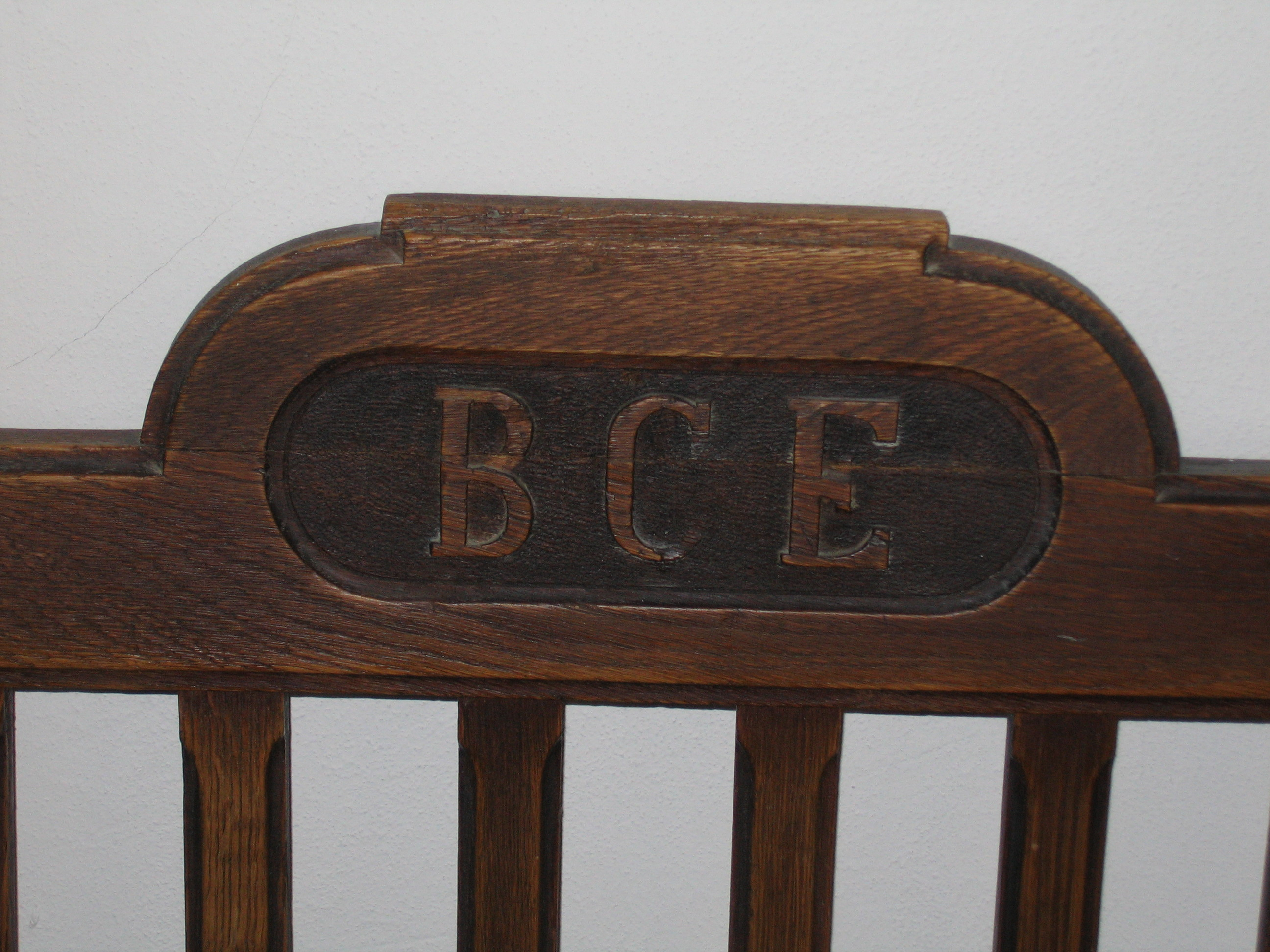
Logo of the Berlin-Coblenzer Eisenbahn on a waiting room bench

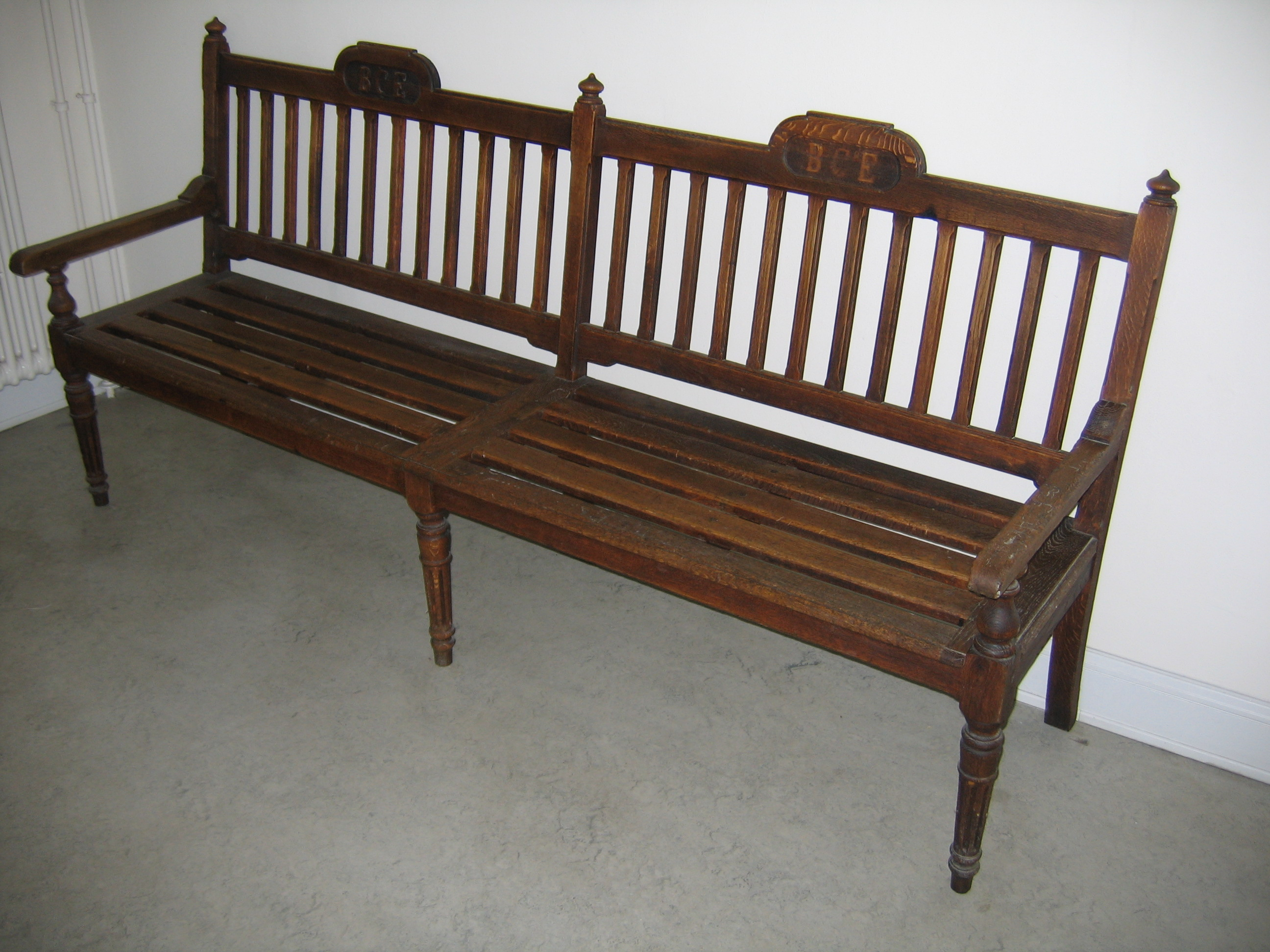
Bench of the Berlin-Coblenzer Eisenbahn

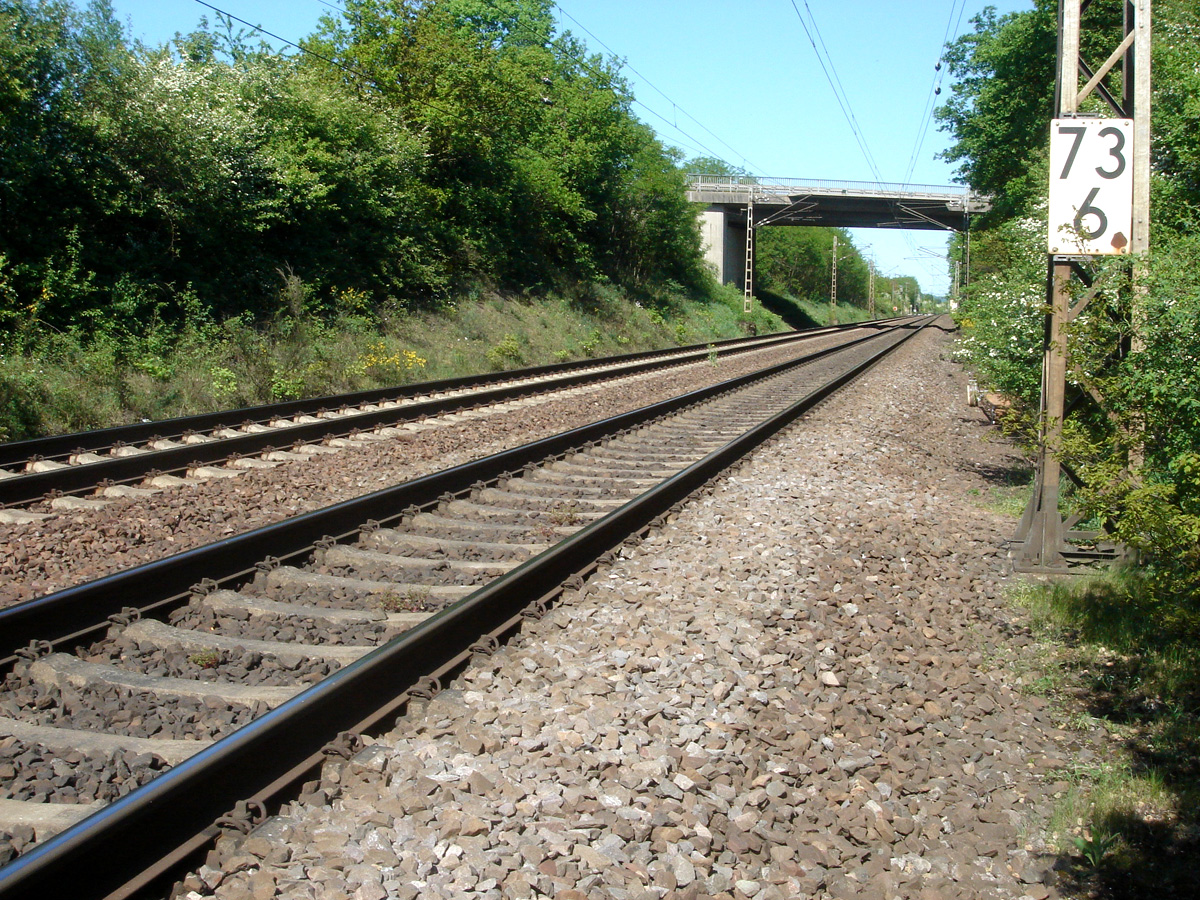
Moselle line

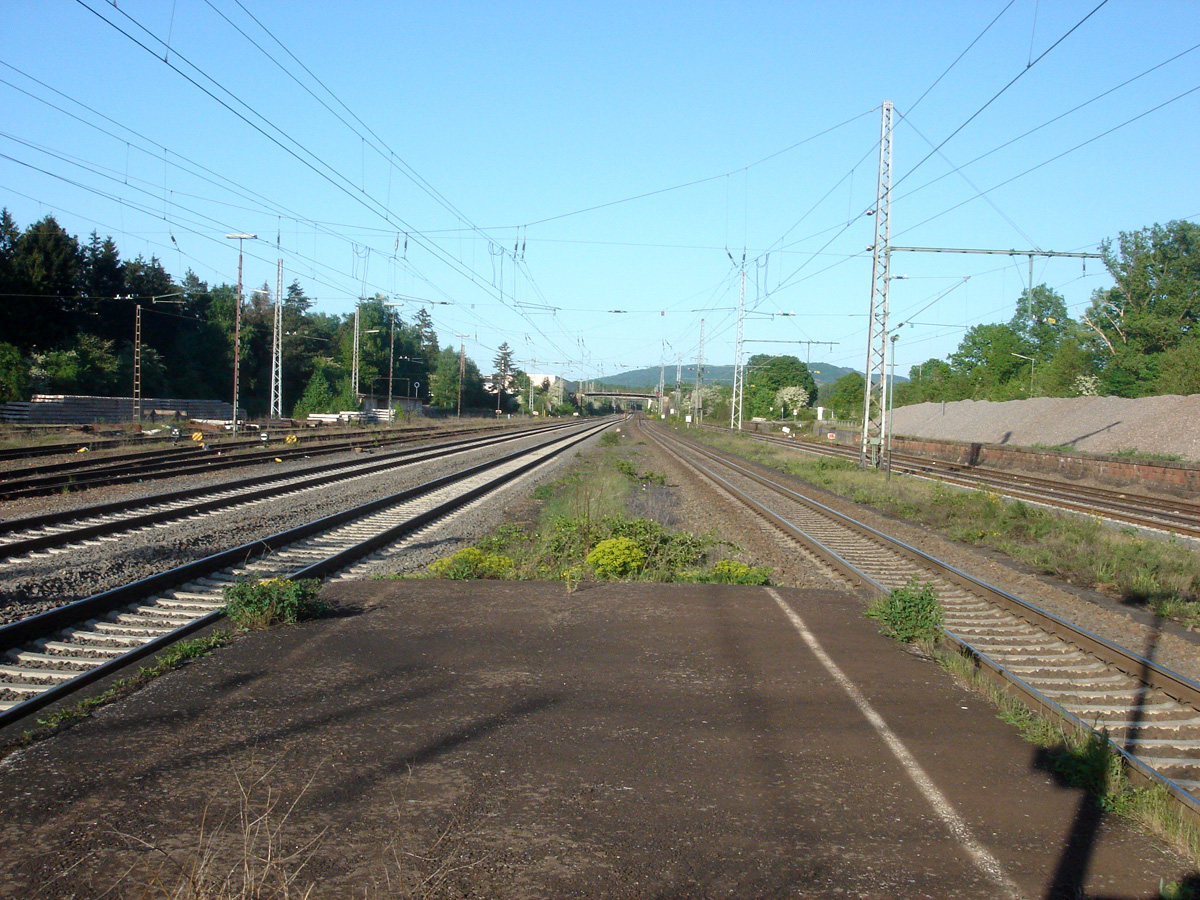
Moselle line (Wittlich)

Kanonenbahn is not an official name for the line. There are a number of other names for the line or sections of it:

- Berlin–Metz Railway (Berlin-Metzer Bahn)
- Wetzlar Railway (Wetzlarer Bahn) or Berlin–Wetzlar Railway (Berlin-Wetzlarer Bahn)
- Berlin–Coblenz Railway (Berlin-Coblenzer Eisenbahn, BCE)
- Berlin–Blankenheim Railway (Berlin-Blankenheimer Bahn)
- Moselle line (Moselstrecke)

Four different railway divisions were responsible for the supervision of the construction of sections of the line and used different names for the line. For example, the official tender for construction of the line in Eichsfeld described the line as the Berlin–Coblenz Railway. The initials "BCE" are found on benches and chairs in railway stations and various buildings on the line.

== Background ==
Strategic railways are lines built on military grounds without regard to the economics or the potential civilian traffic on the line in peace times. Certain design parameters such as minimum curve radius, maximum gradient and maximum load had to be met. It was planned as a double-track line with the aim to bypassing urban areas where possible.

The military expressed interest in a continuous railway at an early date. For example, as early as 1855 the private sector lobbied the Prussian Minister of Commerce, Trade and Public Works for a railway through the Moselle valley from Koblenz to Trier. It was claimed that such a line would carry gypsum, slate and iron ore. The president of Rhine Province wrote in response two weeks later on 31 August 1855 that the War Ministry has repeatedly stressed the military importance of a railway from Koblenz to Trier and supported the immediate building of such a line, which would form a natural extension a railway line from Berlin via Halle, Kassel, Gießen, Wetzlar to Koblenz, running to the south western periphery of the kingdom of Prussia. It would at the same time provide a direct connection between the central Rhine, the most remote part of Prussia, the old Prussian provinces and the centre of the state (Berlin). However, it would be more than 15 years before the project was completed.

No later than 1871, preliminary studies were carried out of the route of the line, selecting a route that for the most part had little or no civilian importance for traffic and which bypassed urban areas. Private plans for the railway’s construction were rejected with state funding available from the French reparations. On 12 June 1872, the Verein für die Gründung einer directen Eisenbahn von Berlin nach Frankfurt am Main ("Association for the establishment of a direct railway from Berlin to Frankfurt am Main") applied to the Prussian Minister of Trade, Commerce and Public Works for a concession for a railway line. This request was rejected only 14 days later on the grounds that the government was planning a direct connection between the eastern and western railways networks and that the government intended to take into account the need for a line from Berlin to Frankfurt am Main. In 1872 surveyors and engineers had already staked out the planned line on the Lollar–Wetzlar section.

On 18 December 1872 the Prussian government presented a plan for the construction of the Berlin–Wetzlar railway to the Prussian House of Representatives. An act “for the issuing of a bond in the amount of 120 million Thalers to extend, complement and improve the equipment of the state railway network of 11 June 1873”, known as the Kanonenbahngesetz (“Cannons Railway Act”) authorised the construction of the railway using French reparations and authorising bonds to be raised for the line.

== Sections ==
The entire route has a length of about 805 km, of which around 511 km was built under the Cannons Railway Act. These were mainly the Berlin–Blankenheim line (Wetzlar Railway or Wetzlar line), the Leinefelde–Treysa line and the Koblenz–Trier–Thionville line. There were also two new short sections, the Lollar–Wetzlar line and a new connection from Hohenrhein to Koblenz over the Rhine. The remaining sections of the railway used existing lines, which included the Halle–Kassel line, the Thuringian railway’s Gotha–Leinefelde branch line, the Main-Weser Railway, the Lahntal railway and the French Chemins de fer de l'Est’s line to Metz.

The project included the upgrading of these existing routes for the Cannons Railway such as the duplication of the Lahntal railway. The Cannons Railway was opened in 24 sections. These were:

	Section	Length km	Opening	Line
1.	Charlottenburg–Grunewald	3.12	1 June 1882	Berlin-Blankenheim line
2.	Grunewald–Sandersleben	160.29	15 April 1879	Berlin-Blankenheim line
3.	Sandersleben–Hettstedt	6.43	10 January 1877	Berlin-Blankenheim line
4.	Hettstedt–Blankenheim	18.56	15 April 1879	Berlin-Blankenheim line
5.	Blankenheim–Nordhausen	50.50	10 July 1866	Halle–Kassel line
6.	Nordhausen–Leinefelde	42.26	9 July 1867	Halle–Kassel line
7.	Leinefelde–Silberhausen-Trennung station	8.22	3 October 1870	Gotha-Leinefelde line
8.	Silberhausen-Trennung–Eschwege	37.69	15 May 1880	Leinefelde–Treysa line
9.	Eschwege–Niederhone	3.29	31 October 1875	Leinefelde–Treysa line
10.	Niederhone–Malsfeld	40.41	15 May 1879	Leinefelde–Treysa line
11.	Malsfeld–Treysa (old station)	40.39	1 August 1879	Leinefelde–Treysa line
12.	Treysa (old station)–Kirchhain	26.93	4 March 1850	Main-Weser Railway
13.	Kirchhain–Marburg	15.09	3 April 1850	Main-Weser Railway
14.	Marburg–Lollar	21.63	25 July 1850	Main-Weser Railway
15.	Lollar–Wetzlar	18.04	15 October 1878	Lollar–Wetzlar line
16.	Wetzlar–Weilburg	23.03	10 January 1863	Lahntal railway
17.	Weilburg–Limburg	2914	14 October 1862	Lahntal railway
18.	Limburg–Nassau	26.39	5 July 1862	Lahntal railway
19.	Nassau–Bad Ems	7.91	9 July 1860	Lahntal railway
20.	Bad Ems–Hohenrhein	10.34	1 July 1858	Lahntal railway
21.	Hohenrhein–Koblenz	7.09	15 May 1879	Lahntal railway
22.	Koblenz–Ehrang	105.25	15 May 1879	Moselle line
23.	Ehrang–Diedenhofen (new)	76	15 May 1878	Thionville–Trier line
24.	Diedenhofen (old)–Metz (old)	27	16 September 1854	Metz–Luxembourg railway
	Total length	805.00	from 4 March 1850	

For the management of the construction of the Cannons Railway, four Royal Railway Divisions (Königliche Eisenbahndirektionen, KED) and General Division of the Imperial Railways in Alsace-Lorraine were in charge:

- Berlin–Nordhausen: KED Berlin
- Nordhausen–Eschwege–Treysa–Lollar: KED Cassel, from 1 April 1876: KED Frankfurt (M)
- Lollar–Wetzlar, Oberlahnstein–Coblenz–Güls, Hohenrhein–Niederlahnstein: KED Wiesbaden
- Güls–Ehrang–border near Sierck: KED Saarbrücken

== Further development ==
In 1880–1882, the railway was completed throughout. During the planning and construction, however, the Prussian main railway network was nationalised. A major reason for the construction of the railway, the independence of the various private railway companies, was thus already eliminated at, or shortly after, its completion. Similarly, the building of the line far from urban areas for strategic reasons proved to be an obstacle to the development of traffic. For through traffic, the whole line was never important. In places, the line did not need the originally planned double track. In the following years, individual sections of the route developed very differently. Some sections, such as Berlin–Wiesenburg or Koblenz–Trier attracted through traffic. Others had only local importance.

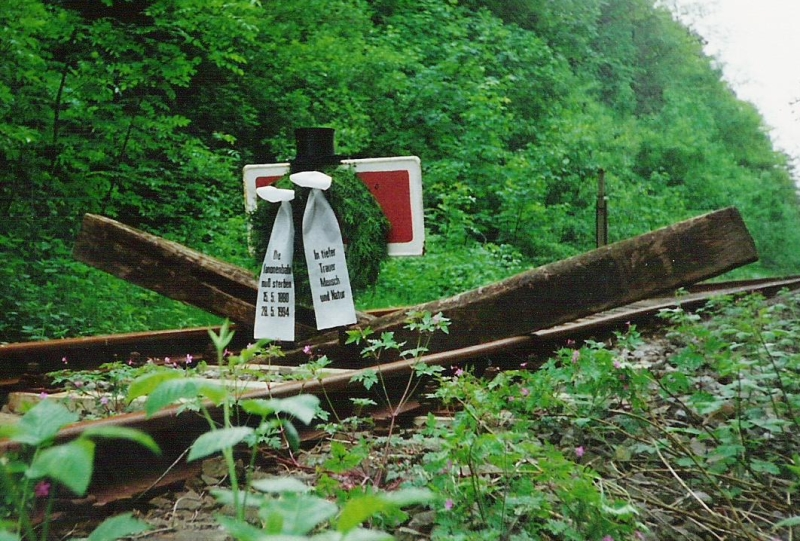
Wreath on the line during the closure in Küllstedt, west of Leinefelde-Worbis

In 1945 the line was divided by the Inner German border between Geismar and Schwebda. This meant that the Cannons Railway was no longer a continuous line and it decreased the importance of the Hessian sections. In 1974 passenger services on the Malsfeld –Waldkappel section were abandoned, which was followed by the closure and dismantling of that section and in other sections in Hesse. After 1990, sections that had been in East Germany were also closed.
