= CFL Line 90 =

Railway line from Luxembourg City to France

Overview
- Owner: CFL
- Locale: Luxembourg, France
- Termini: Luxembourg; Nancy

Service
- Operator(s): CFL, SNCF

Line 90 is a railway line connecting Luxembourg City to France. The terminus at the north end is Luxembourg railway station, whilst the terminals at the south are the French towns of Metz and Nancy. It is designated Chemins de Fer Luxembourgeois but predominantly operated by SNCF, as the TER Grand Est line L1.

== Stations ==
- Luxembourg
- Bettembourg
- Hettange-Grande (France)
- Thionville (France)
- Uckange (France)
- Hagondange (France)
- Walygator Parc (France)
- Maizières-lès-Metz (France)
- Woippy (France)
- Metz-Nord (France)
- Metz-Ville (France)
- Pagny-sur-Moselle (France)
- Pont-à-Mousson (France)
- Nancy (France)
