= Lollar–Wetzlar railway =

Railway line in Hesse, Germany

Lollar–Wetzlar
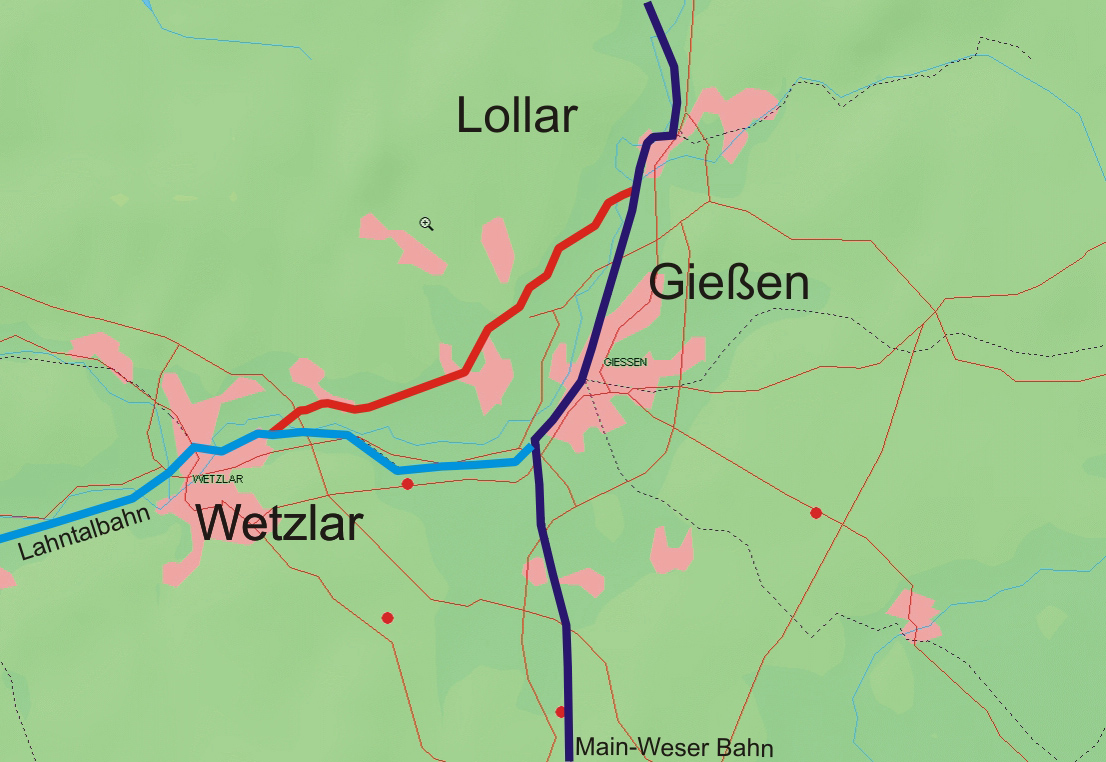

Overview
- Line number: 3706
- Locale: Hesse

Service
- Route number: 526 (1980)

Technical
- Line length: 18.0 km (11.2 mi)
- Track gauge: 1,435 mm (4 ft 8 1/2 in) standard gauge

The Lollar–Wetzlar railway was a railway line in the German state of Hesse, connecting the towns of Lollar and Wetzlar via Lahnau. It was opened in 1878 as part of the Cannons Railway (Kanonenbahn) from Berlin to Metz, but was closed in 1983.

== History ==
The 18.04 km long Lollar–Wetzlar line was built as a bypass for Gießen. The line separated in Lollar from the Main-Weser Railway coming from the north and ran directly to Wetzlar, where the Cannons Railway continued over the Lahntal railway to the west. This work was built under the leadership of Julius Lehwald.

The initial survey work for the line was carried out in 1872. Construction began on 1 July 1875 and was completed in July 1878. The line was officially opened on 15 October 1878. This line allowed the Cannons Railway to avoid the Gießen rail node. Because the line's primary significance was military, it served none of the nearby localities. The line features huge radius curves and low grades. Some of the foundations of the bridges were designed to allow track duplication. The line joined the Dill line at a flying junction at Wetzlar freight yard.

Passenger traffic on this line ceased on 30 May 1980. Freight traffic was closed between Lollar and Abendstern on 28 February 1983 to allow a bypass road to be built. The remaining freight between Wetzlar and Abendstern was abandoned on 28 September 1991.
