= Jürgen Kröger =

German architect

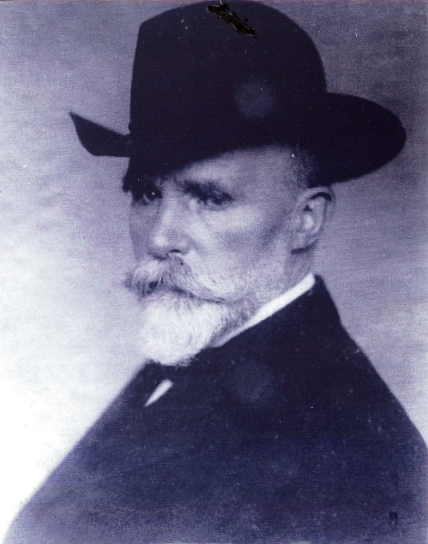
Jürgen Kröger

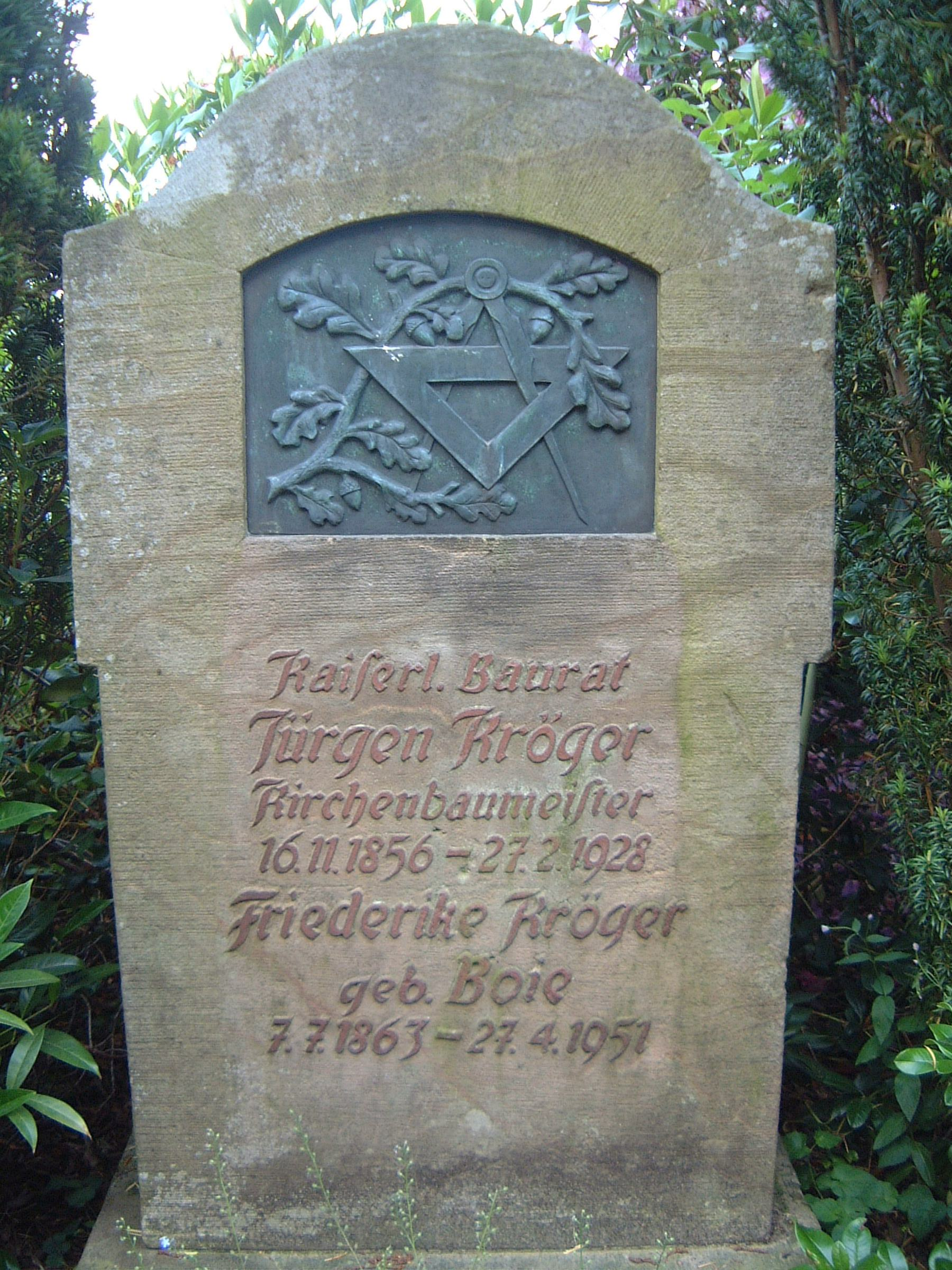
Gravestone of Jürgen Kröger

Jürgen Kröger (1856 – 1928) was a German architect. He was an architectural advisor to the German Emperor, Wilhelm II and in 1908 he was awarded the title of Building Advisor to the Emperor. Kröger is most notable for his construction of Protestant church buildings and Metz Train Station in the now French region of Lorraine. The poet Timm Kröger was his uncle.

== Early life and education ==
Kröger was born on 6 November 1856 in Haale, Germany. Kröger began his training in 1873 at the Göttsche master carpentry school in Hohenwestedt. He passed his architecture exams with honors in 1880 from a school in Eckernförde.

== Career ==
Kröger worked as a construction specialist in the construction division of the War Department in Altona, Hamburg. In 1882, he was hired to work in the Berlin office of the famous architect Johannes Otzen.

In 1888, Kröger went into private practice and, in the following decades, was responsible for the construction numerous Protestant churches, especially in the neogothic style. One of his most well-known works was the Metz Train Station in Alsace-Lorraine built in 1908. When it opened on 17 August 1908, Kaiser Wilhelm II appointed him "(Kaiserlicher) Baurat" or Building Advisor to the Emperor.

== Death and legacy ==
Kröger died on 27 February 1928 in Aukrug.

== Work ==
For a complete listing, see the corresponding article in the German Wikipedia.

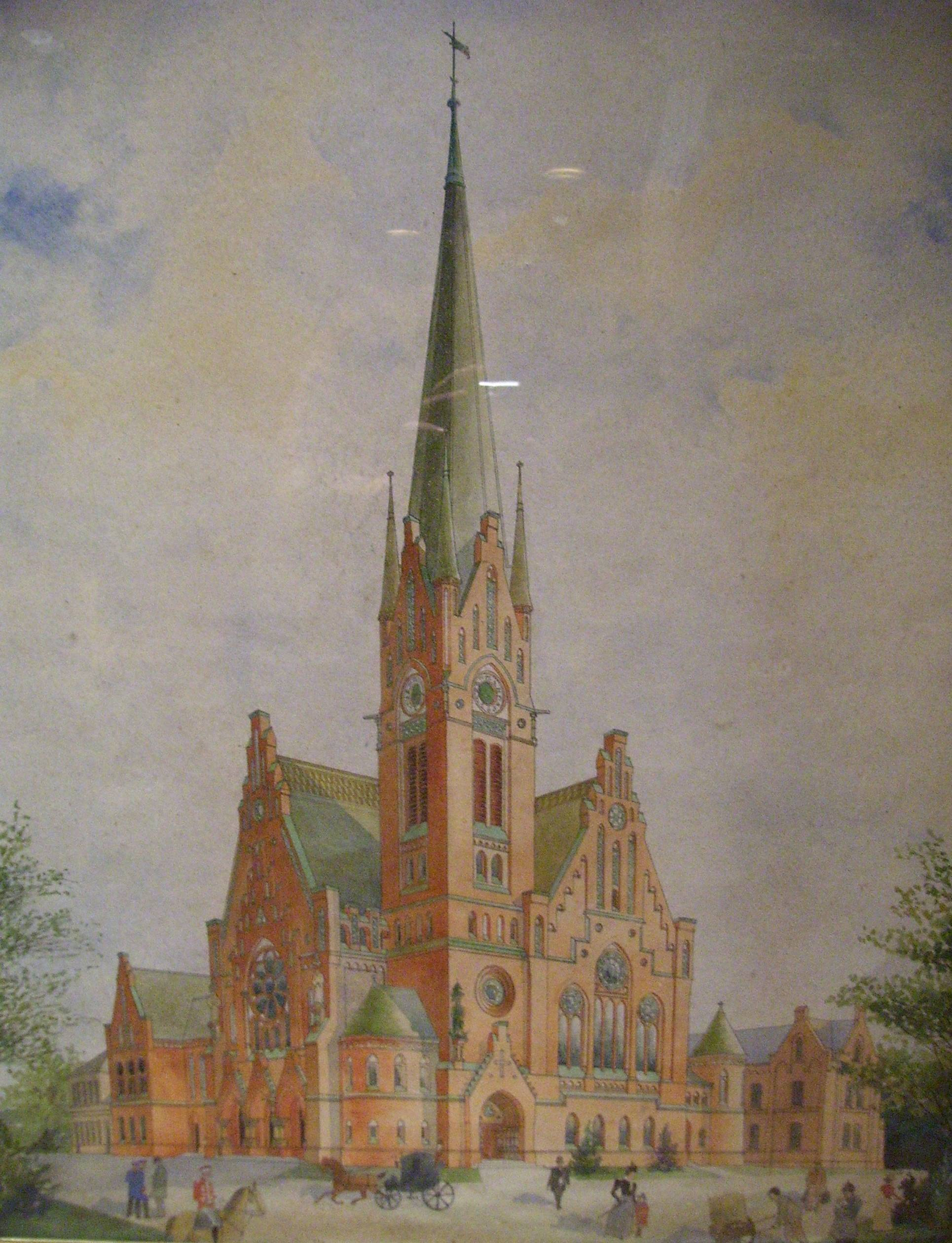
St. Michaelis Kirche in Bremen

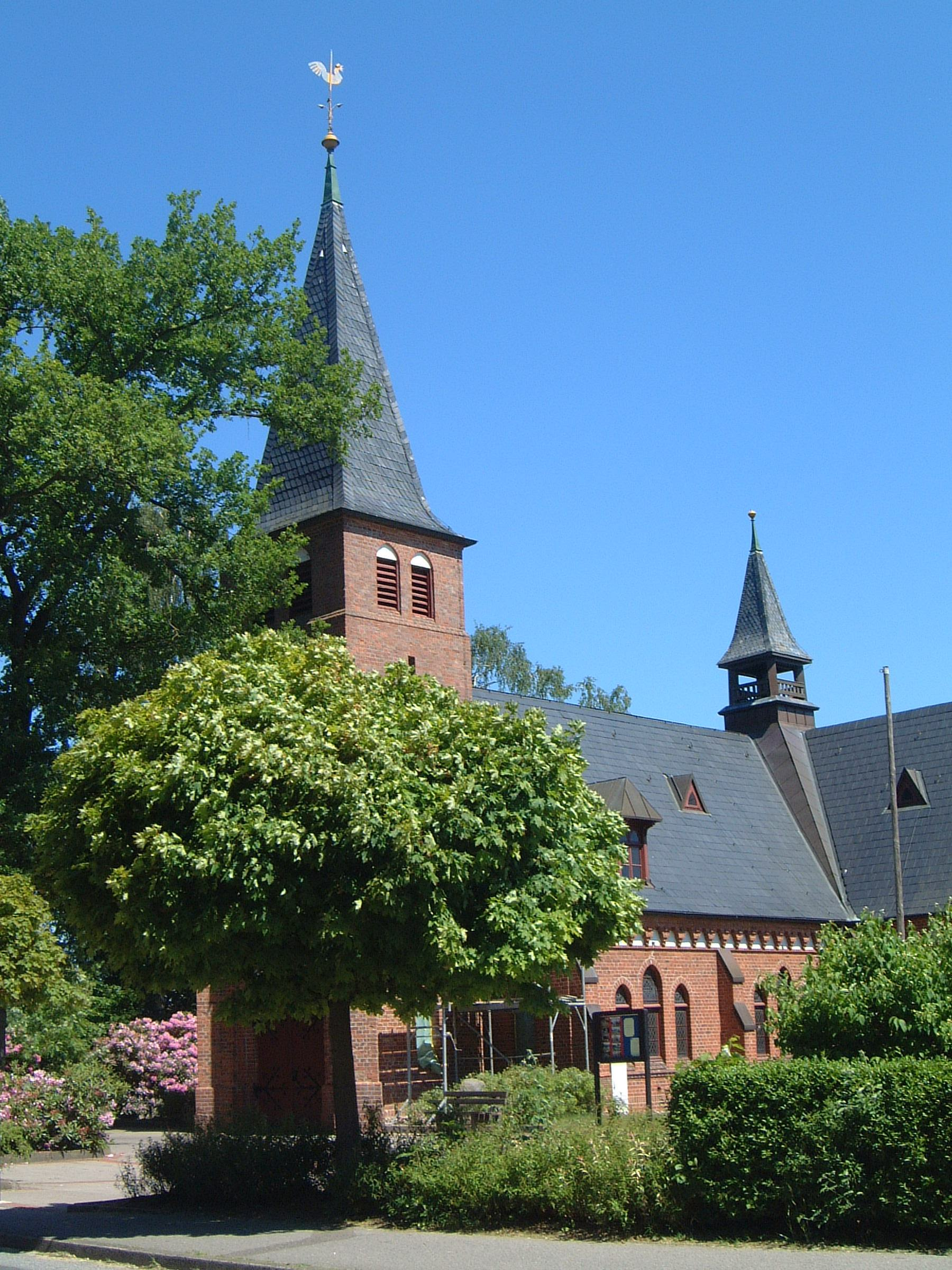
Kirchturm in Aukrug-Innien

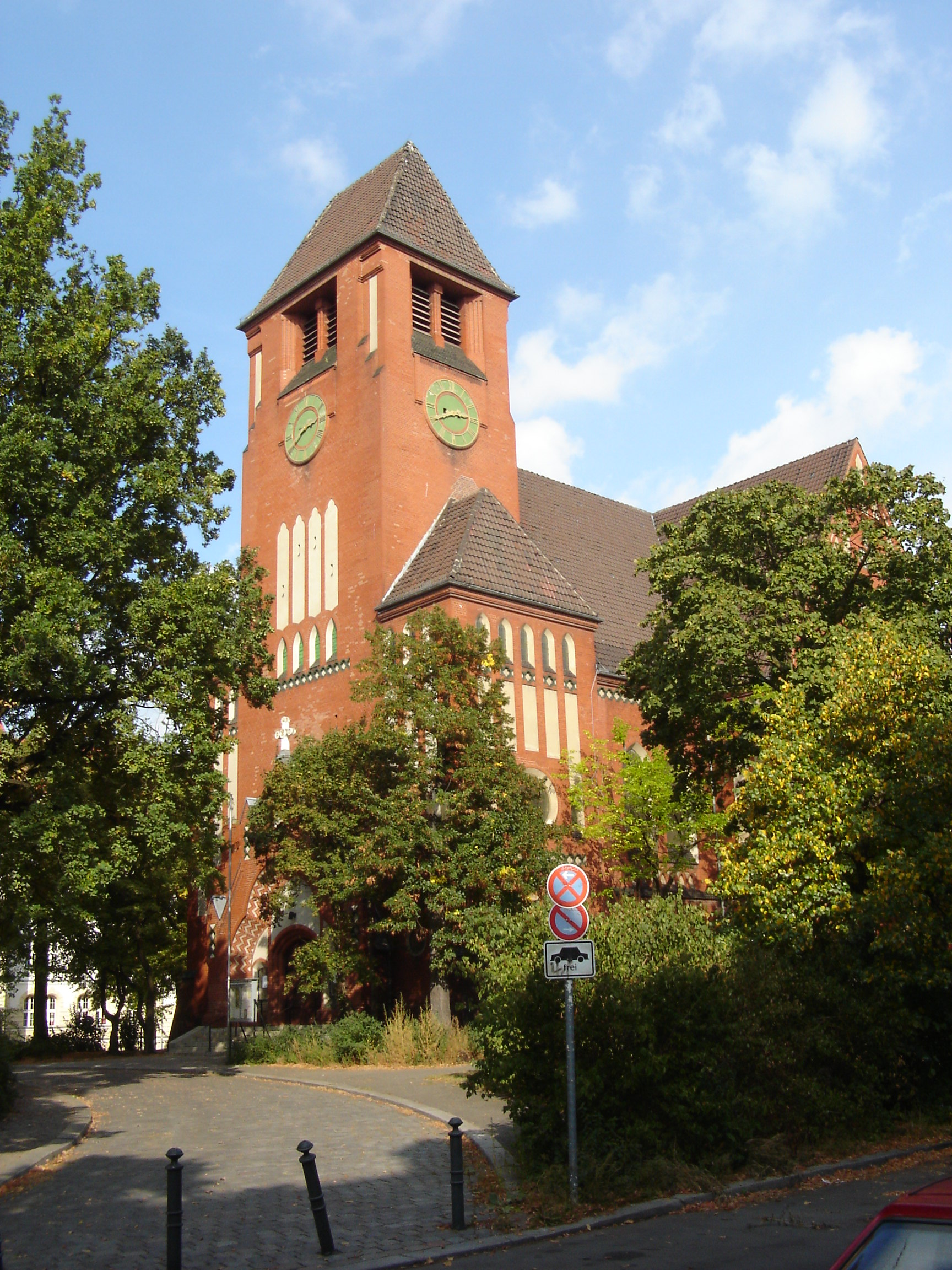
Nathanaelkirche in Berlin

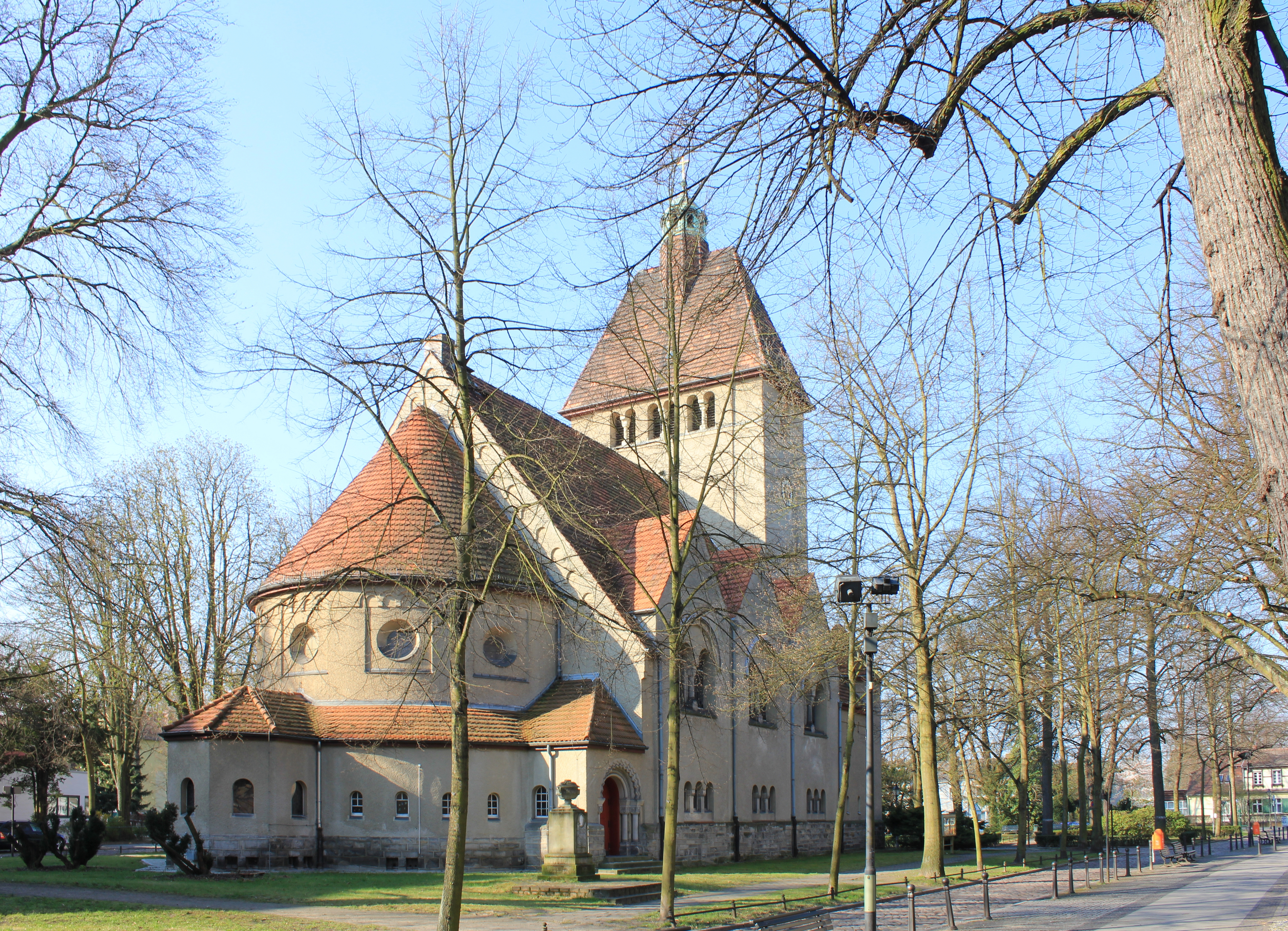
Evangelische Kirche Alt-Tegel in Berlin

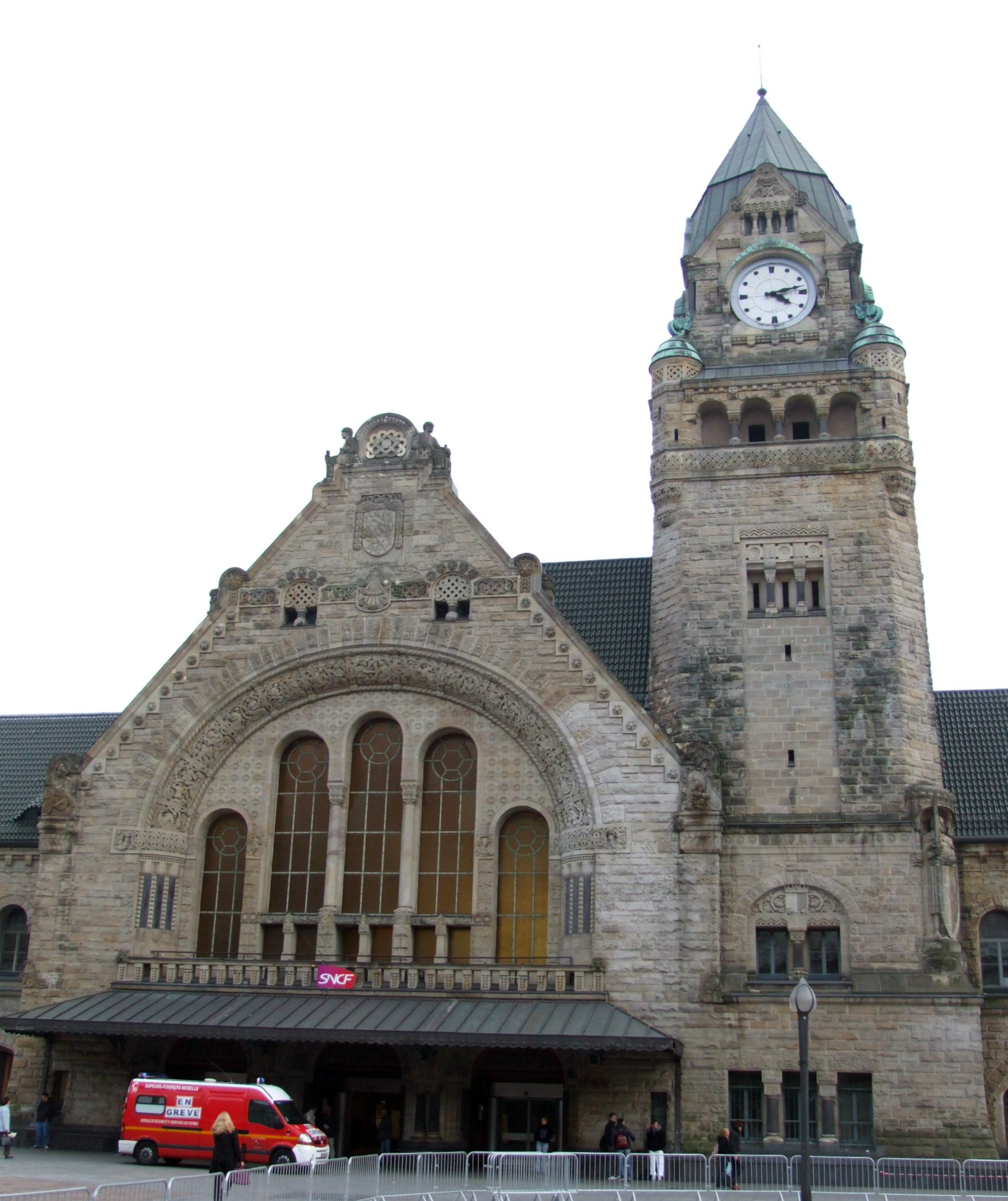
Bahnhof in Metz

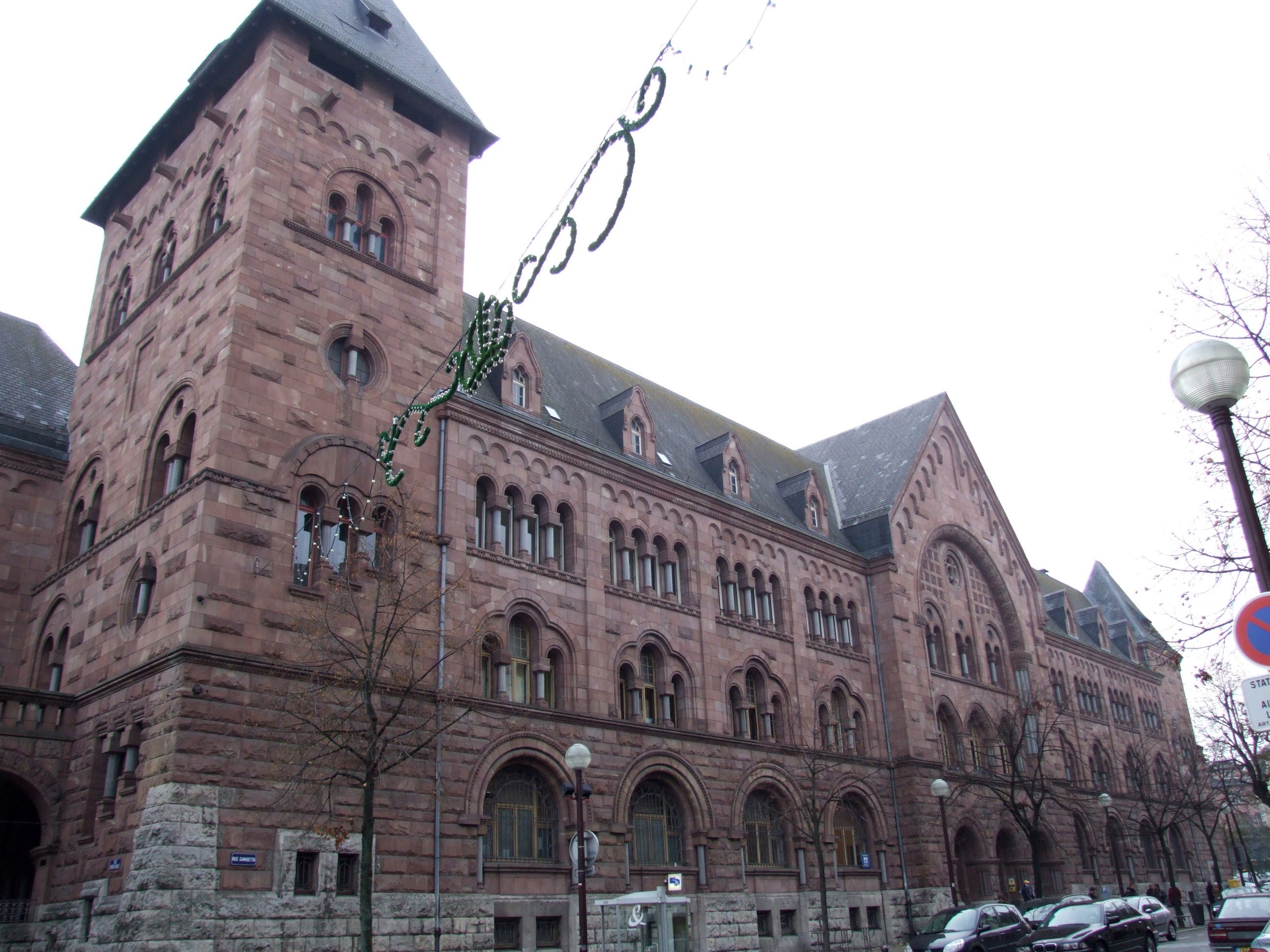
Hotel Metz in Metz
