= Metz–Luxembourg railway =

Railway line in France and Luxembourg

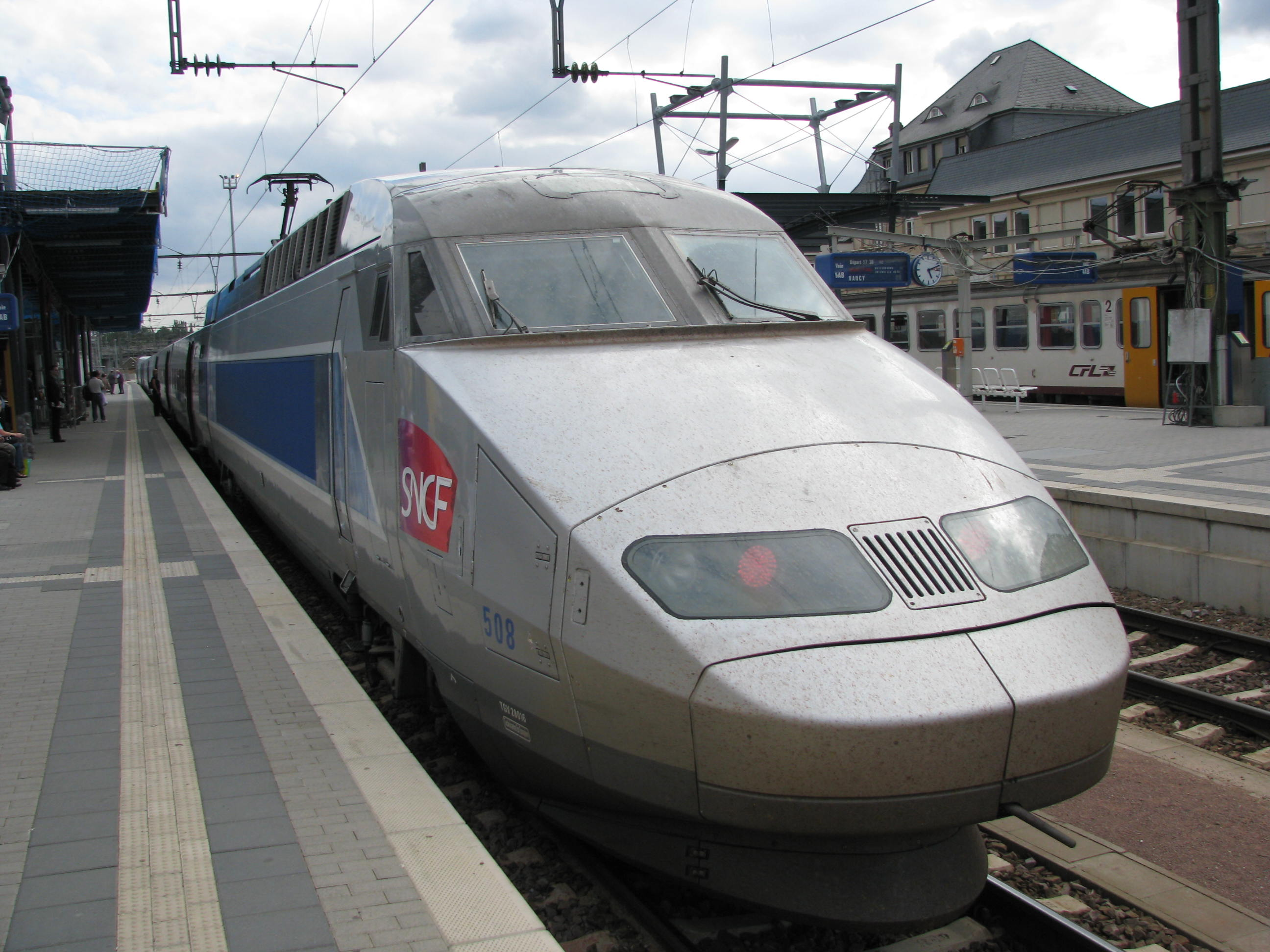
- Metz–Luxembourg railway

Overview
- Status: Operational
- Owner: SNCF / CFL
- Locale: France (Lorraine); Luxembourg
- Termini: Gare de Metz-Ville; Luxembourg railway station

Service
- System: SNCF / CFL
- Operator(s): SNCF / CFL

History
- Opened: 1854-1859

Technical
- Line length: 72 km (45 mi)
- Number of tracks: Double track
- Track gauge: 1,435 mm (4 ft 8 1/2 in) standard gauge
- Electrification: 25 kV 50 Hz
- Operating speed: 160 km/h (99 mph)

The Metz–Luxembourg railway is a 72-kilometre-long (45 mi) French/Luxembourgish railway line, that connects the French Lorraine region to Luxembourg. The railway was opened between 1854 and 1859. It is an important international railway connection. The part in Luxembourg is designated as CFL Line 90.

== Route ==
The line leaves Metz in a northern direction, downstream along the Moselle river. It passes through the industrial area between Metz and Thionville. It crosses the Luxembourg border, finally reaching the capital Luxembourg (city).

=== Main stations ===
The main stations on the Metz–Luxembourg railway are:

- Gare de Metz-Ville
- Gare de Thionville
- Luxembourg railway station

== Services ==
The Metz–Luxembourg railway is used by the following passenger services:

- TGV high speed services from Paris to Luxembourg
- EuroCity services from Brussels to Switzerland, and from Paris to Luxembourg
- Intercités night services from Luxembourg to Nice and Portbou
- TER Grand Est regional services
- CFL Line 60 and Line 90
