= Metz-Ville station =

Railway station in Metz, Lorraine, France

Metz
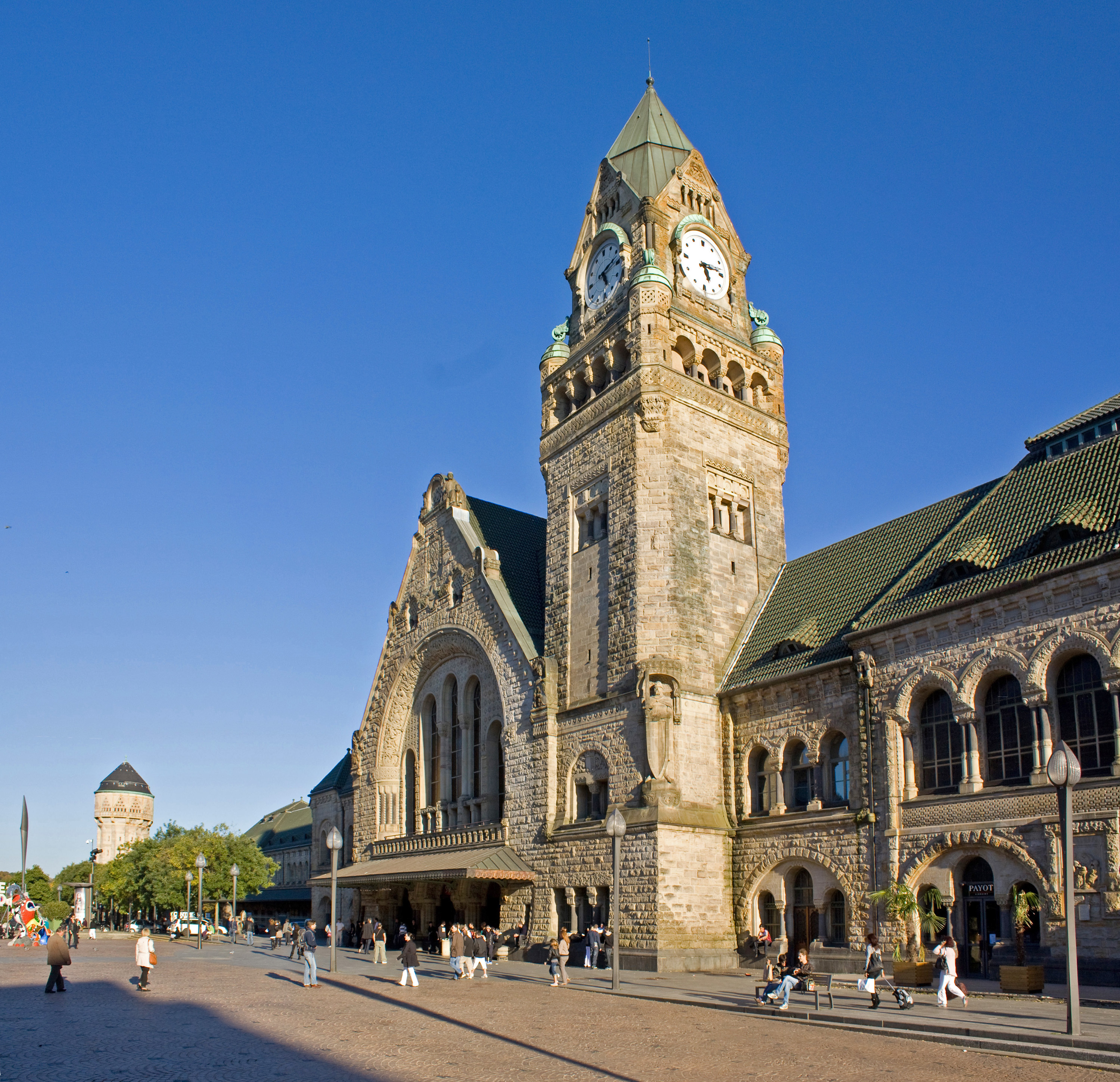
- The railway station of Metz on the Général de Gaulle square

General information
- Location: 1, Place du Général de Gaulle; Metz
- Coordinates: 49.1098°N 6.1772°E
- Owner: SNCF
- Line: Metz–Luxembourg railway
- Platforms: 9

Construction
- Architect: Jürgen Kröger
- Architectural style: Neo-Romanesque

Other information
- Station code: 87192039

History
- Opened: 17 August 1908

Passengers
- 2024: 9,515,104
Services
Preceding station	SNCF	Following station
Meuse TGV towards Paris-Est	TGV inOui	Thionville towards Luxembourg
Terminus	TGV inOui	Strasbourg towards Montpellier
Preceding station	Ouigo	Following station
Paris-Est Terminus	Grande Vitesse	Strasbourg Terminus
Preceding station	TER Grand Est	Following station
Terminus	A14	Peltre towards Strasbourg
Ars-sur-Moselle towards Nancy	L01a	Terminus
Terminus	L01b	Metz-Nord towards Luxembourg
Terminus	L02	Thionville towards Trier Hbf
Terminus	L15	Rémilly towards Saarbrücken Hbf
Terminus	L16	Béning towards Sarreguemines
Onville towards Épernay	L28	Terminus
Onville towards Verdun	L30	Terminus
Hagondange towards Verdun	L30	Terminus
Location

Metz-Ville station (French: Gare de Metz-Ville) is the main railway station serving the city of Metz, capital of Lorraine, France. Built when the city was under German rule, it is sometimes spoken of as the Station Palace as it displays the apartments of the German Kaiser Wilhelm II. Metz station has been registered as a Historic Monument since 15 January 1975. This designation gives legal protection to the station's facade, the roof, the departure hall, the honorary lounge, and the former station restaurant with its interior decorations.

== History and strategic role ==
The station in Metz was a central point of plans for a new urban area in Metz, now called the Imperial Quarter, which was built during the first annexation of Metz into the German Empire. In order to "Germanify" the city, Kaiser Wilhelm II decided upon the creation of a new district shaped by a distinctive blend of Germanic architecture. The district was conceived by German architect Conrad Wahn and is now commonly called the Imperial District.

The railway station constitutes the cornerstone of this district, not far from the historic downtown. Its first aim was military usage and it had to answer a strategic need: For the success of the Schlieffen plan, the Kaiser had to be able to transport his troops from France to Russia in just 24 hours. This resulted in a sizeable station with platforms large enough to accommodate troops on foot and on horseback. So the Metz railway station was directly linked to Berlin via the Cannons Railway.

== Architecture ==
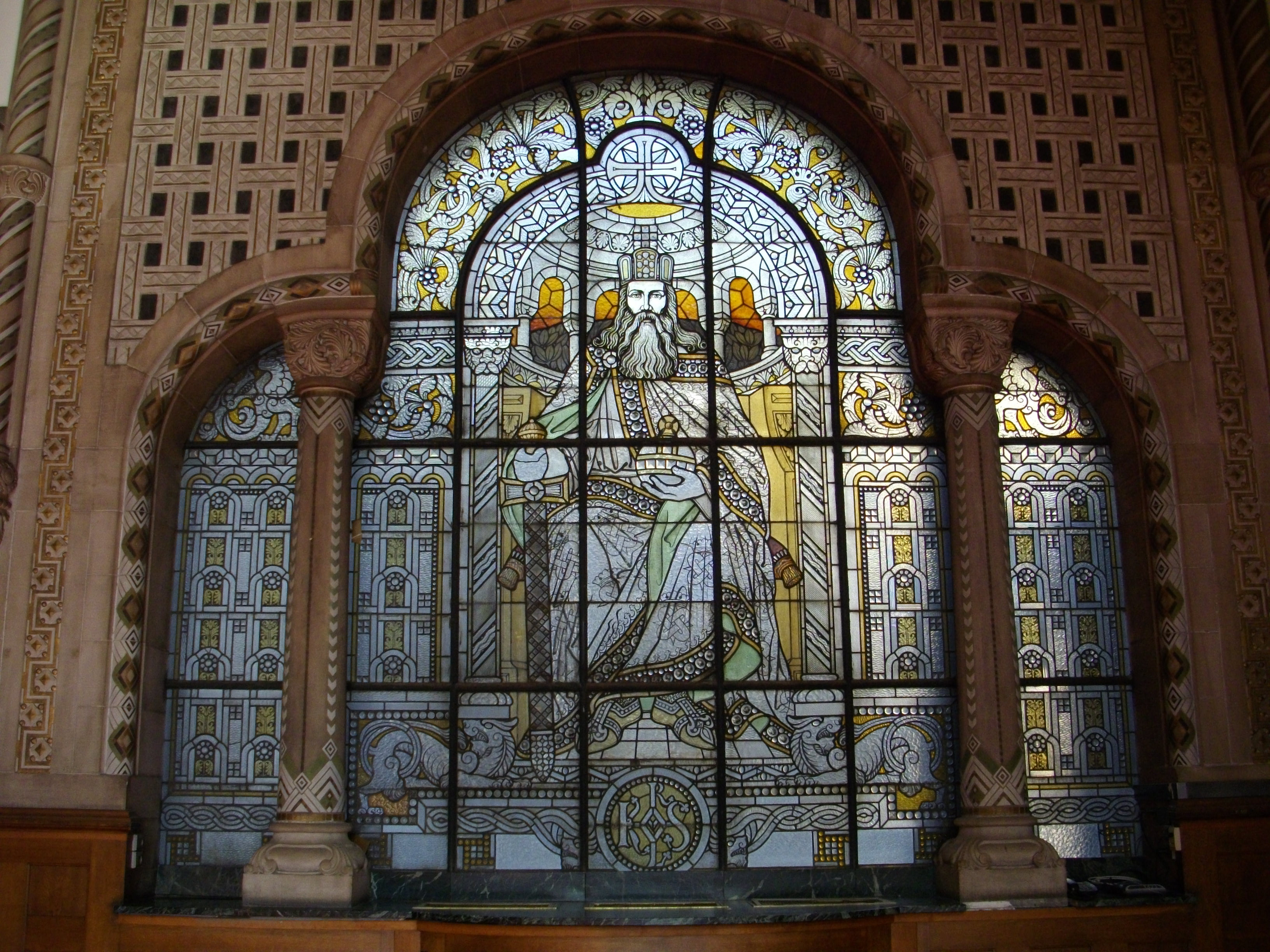
The station's stained-glass depiction of Emperor Charlemagne (1908).

The railway station is a 350-metre-long neo-Romanesque building built between 1905 and 1908 by German architect Jürgen Kröger, assisted by the architects Jürgensen and Bachmann, as well as by the sculptor Schirmer. It was built in the pale grey stoneware of Niderviller, in marked contrast to the other buildings of the city, which are mainly built in yellow limestone. Because of the swampy soil of the area, the station and its water tower are built on 3,034 foundation piles which run from ten to seventeen metres deep, made from the system of reinforced concrete which had just been developed by the French engineer François Hennebique.

The station building is architecturally reminiscent of the shape of a church in the departure hall area, with a clock tower rising 40m in height (said to be designed by Kaiser Wilhelm himself); on the other hand, the arrivals hall and restaurant echo the form of an imperial palace. The purpose of this is to represent the religious and temporal powers of the Holy Roman emperors. The statue of the Knight Roland at the angle of the clock tower represents Imperial protection over Metz. In the great hallway a stained glass window depicts the Emperor Charlemagne sitting on his throne. Kaiser Wilhelm appreciated his travels to Metz and the imperial territory of Alsace-Lorraine, which was administered directly by the imperial government in Berlin. So at the railway station can be seen the apartments he used during his visits to the city; today they have been transformed into offices for the SNCF Railway Company.

The forecourt of the railway station is adorned by street furnitures designed by Philippe Starck.

== Transport ==
The Gare de Metz-Ville is connected to the French TGV high speed train network, which provides a direct rail service to Paris, the city of Luxembourg, Dijon, Lyon, Marseille, and Montpellier. The time from Paris East station to Metz railway station is about 82 minutes. Additionally, Metz railway station is connected to the Lorraine TGV station, located at Louvigny, 25 km (16 mi) at the south of Metz, for high speed trains going to Nantes, Rennes, Brussels, Bordeaux and France international Paris-Charles de Gaulle Airport (without stopping in Paris).

Also Metz is one of the main stations of the regional express trains system TER Grand Est. One of its main lines is the Nancy-Metz-Luxembourg line, completed by many lines going to main cities of the area.

== Gallery ==
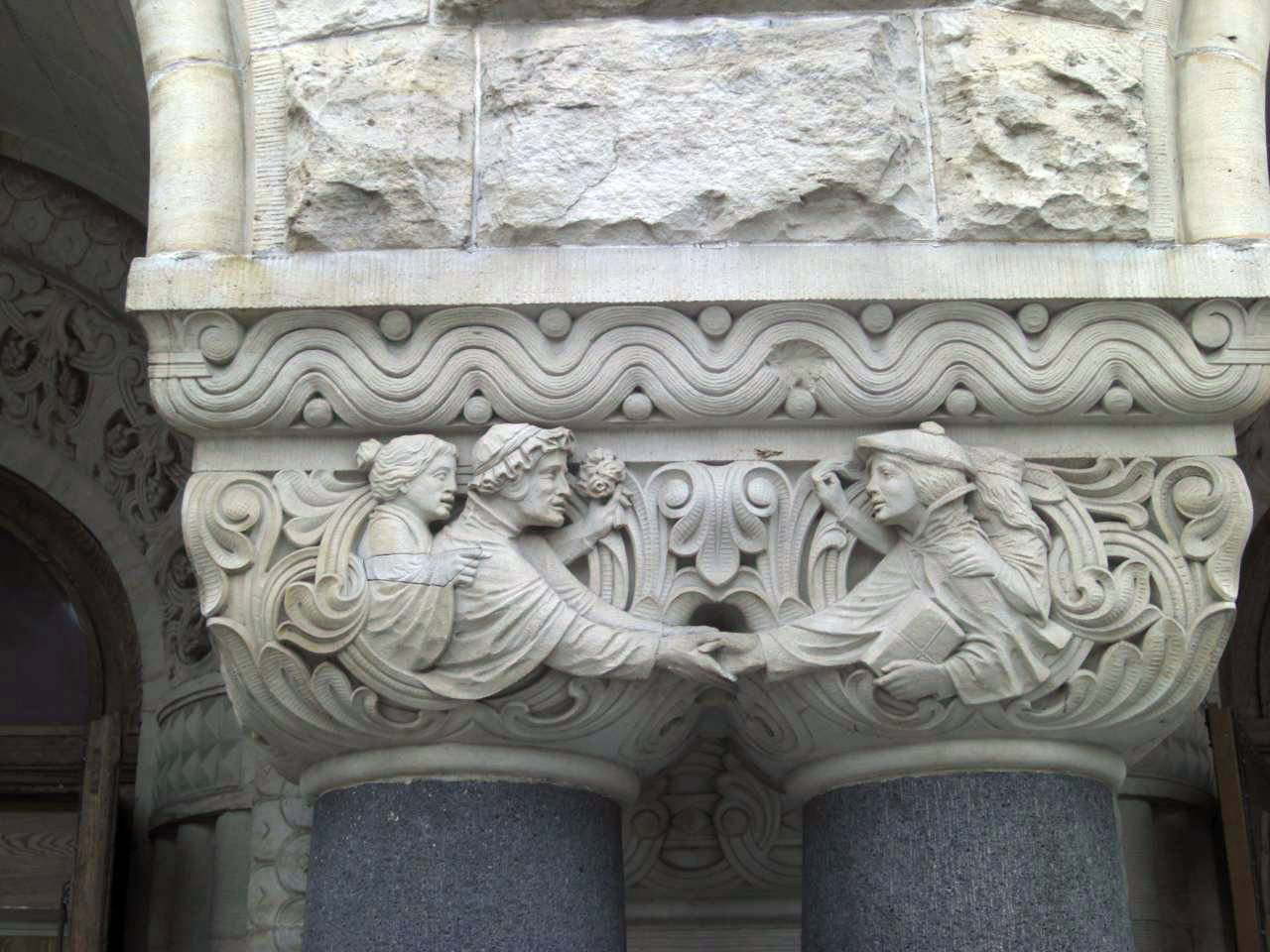
Facade capital indicating the arrival hall.

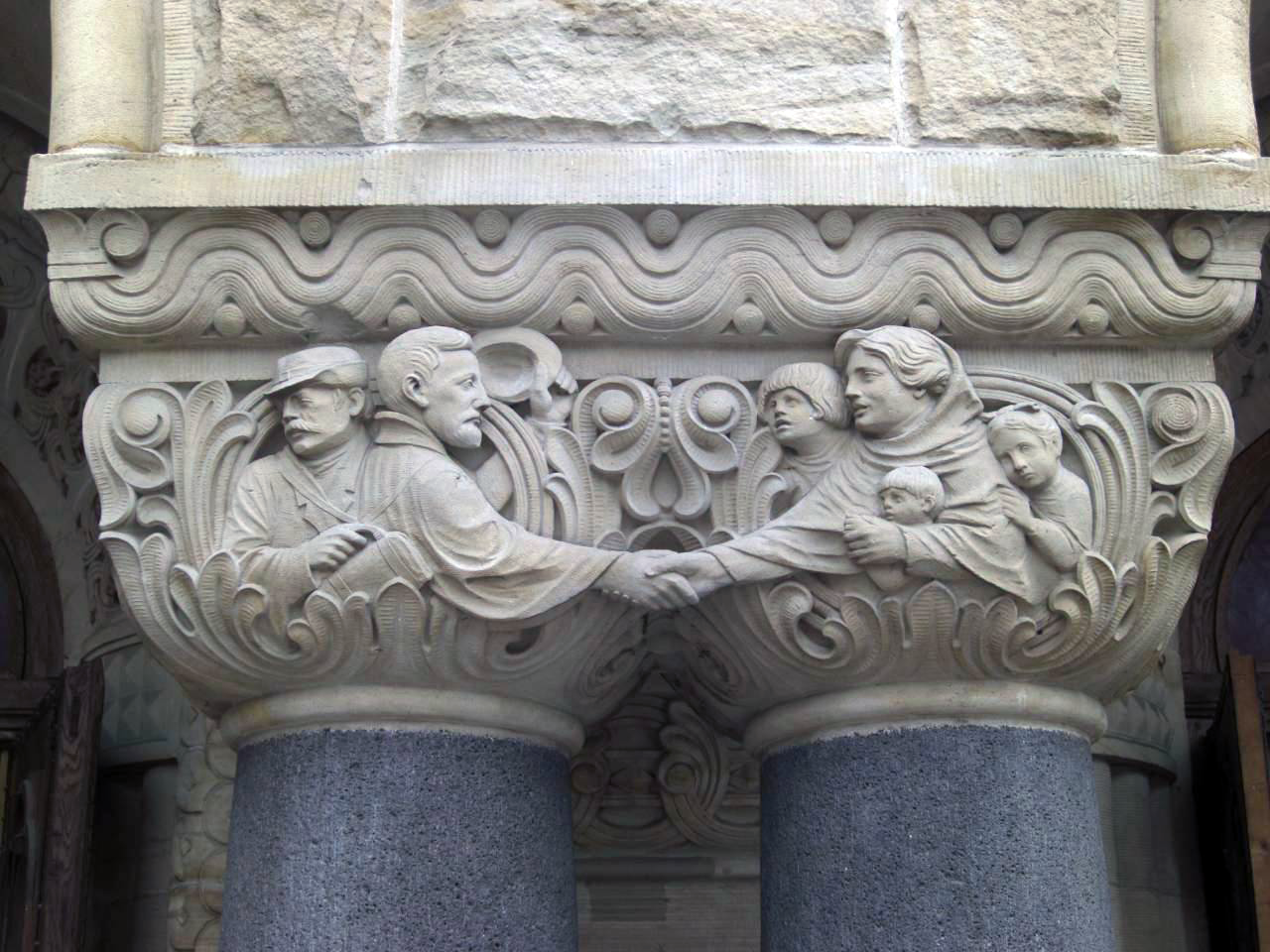
Facade capital indicating the departure hall.

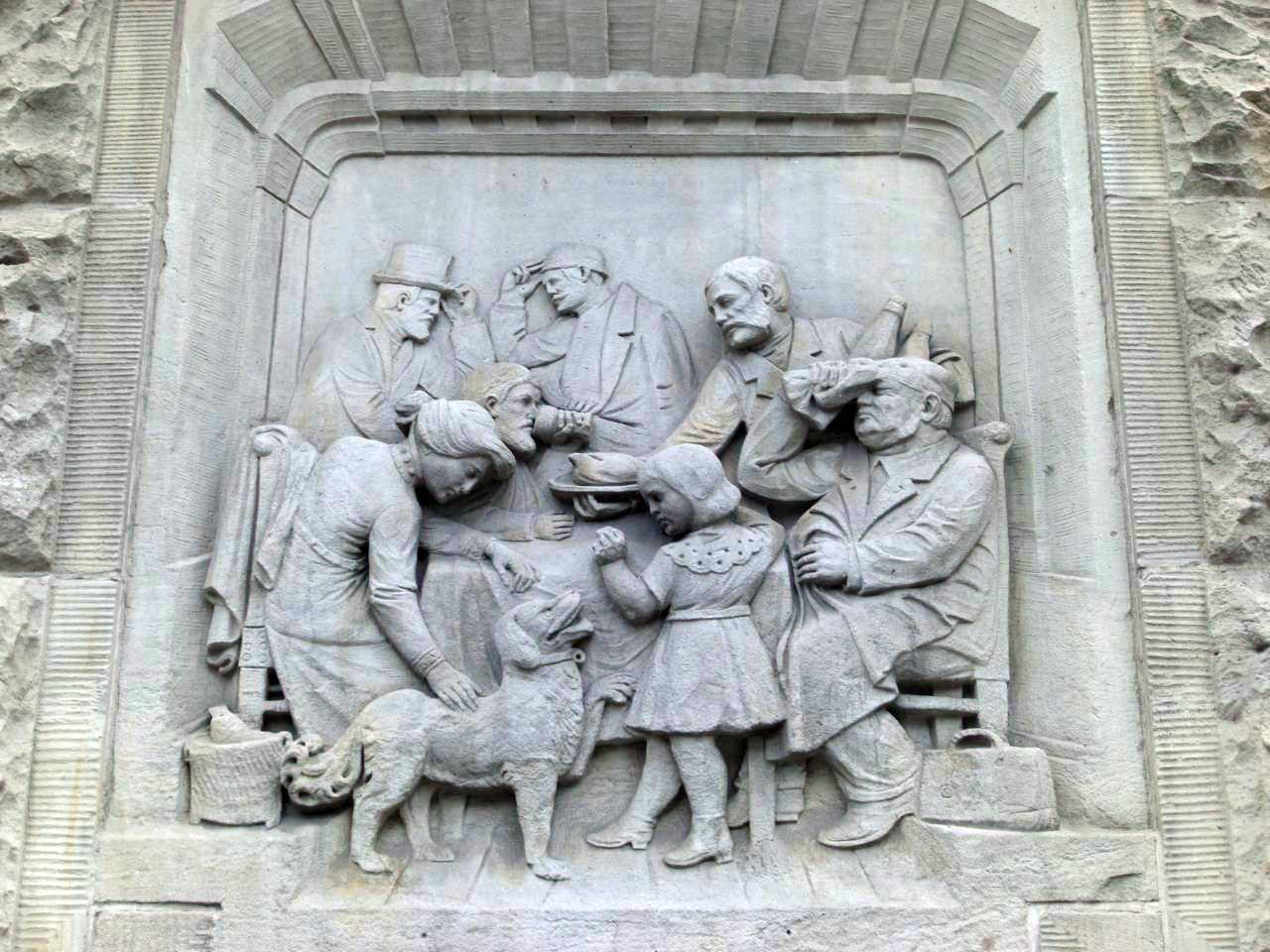
Relief of the waiting room and the station restaurant of the first and second classes.

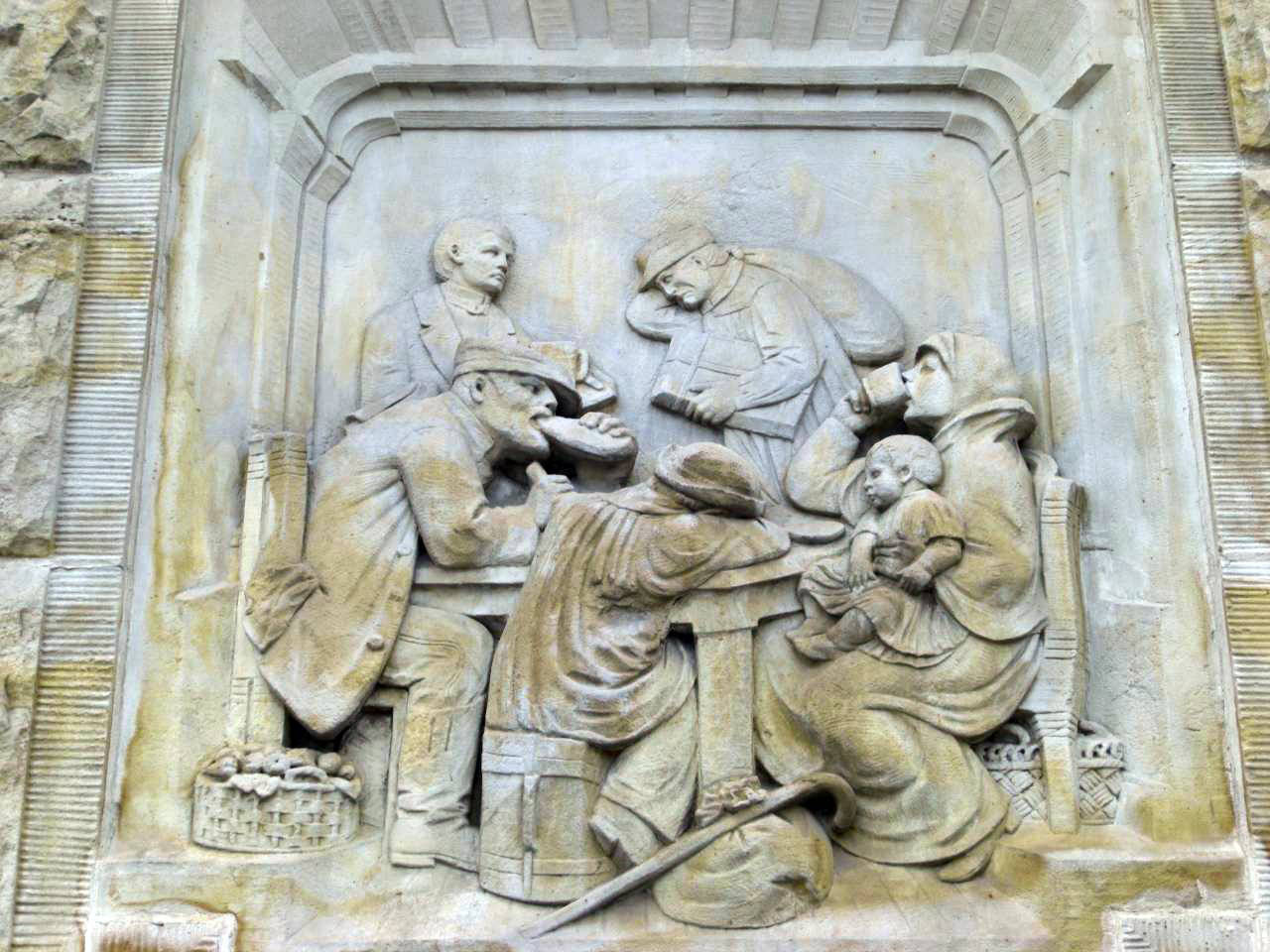
Relief of the waiting room and the station restaurant of the third class.

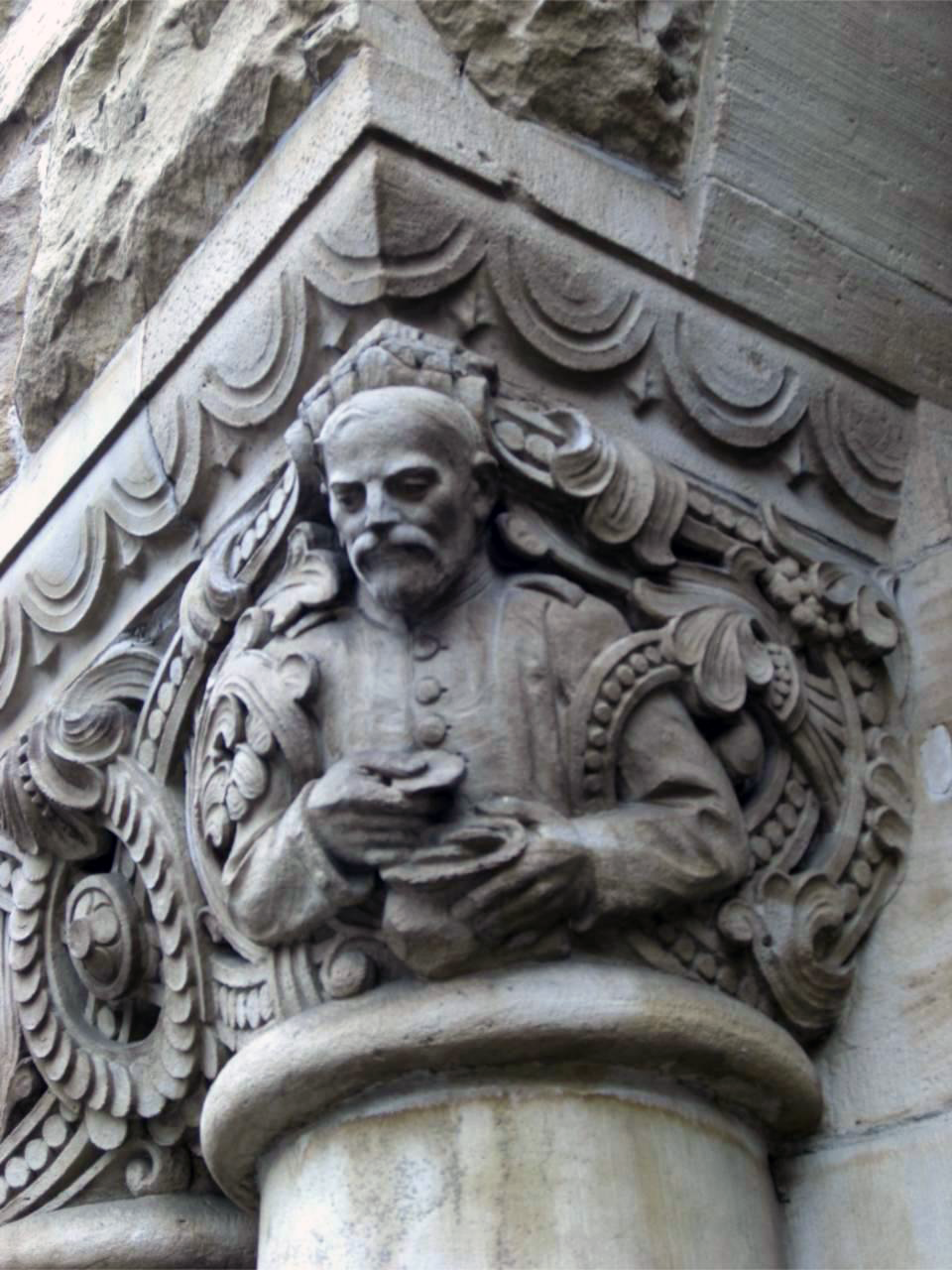
The cash clerk, facade capital indicating the money order service.

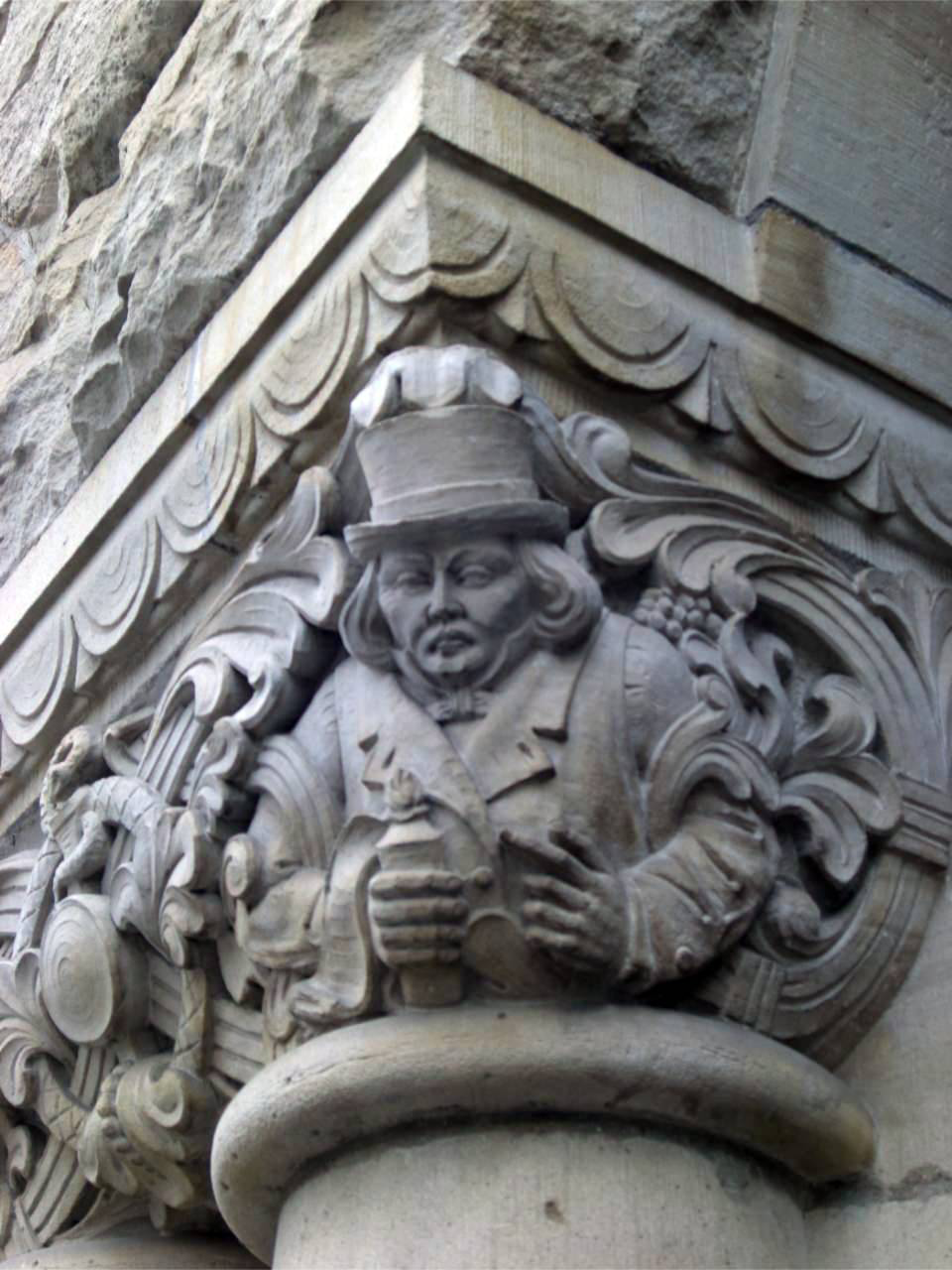
The physician, facade capital indicating the infirmary.

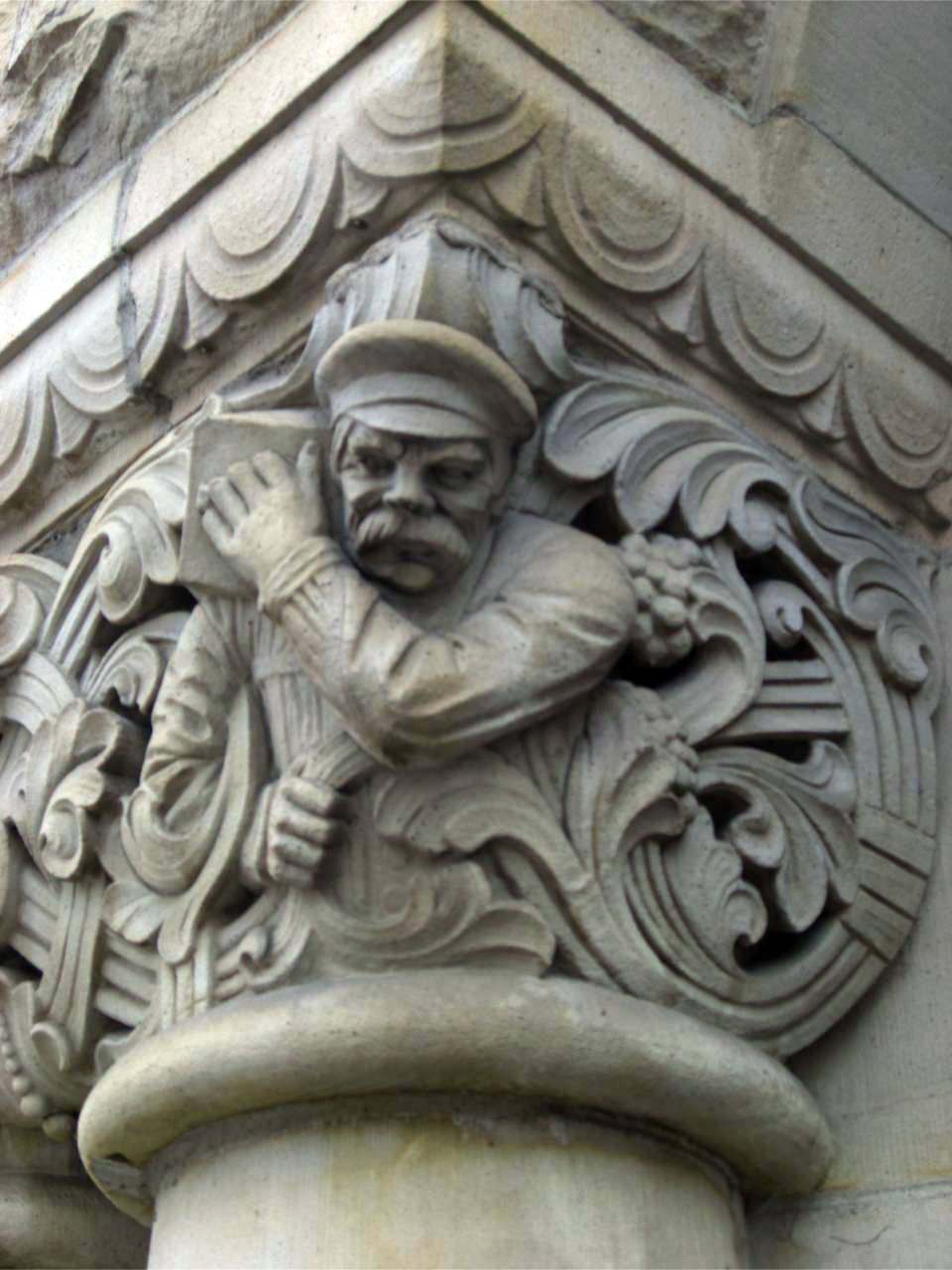
The luggage porter, facade capital indicating the freight platform.

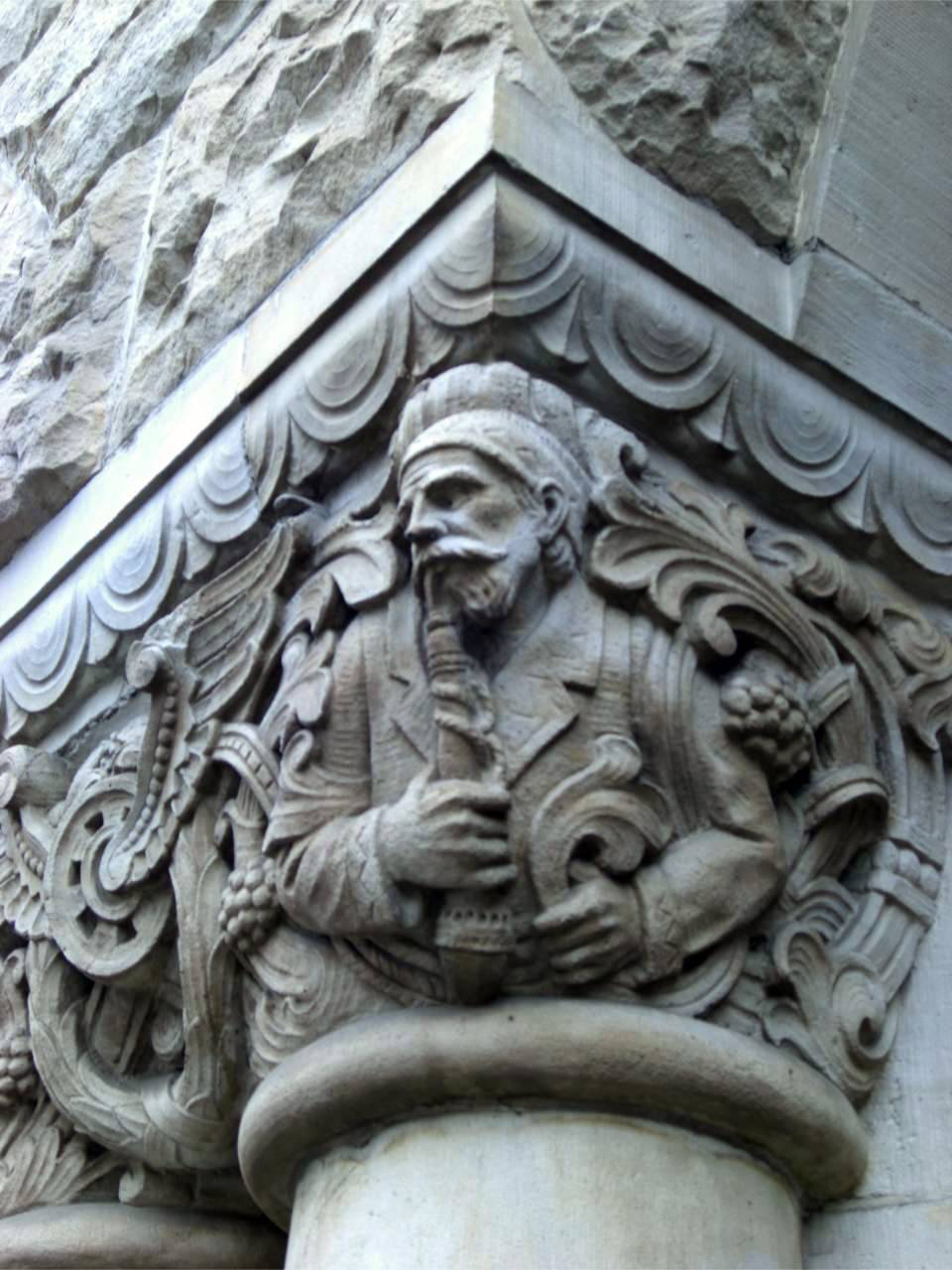
The old man, facade capital indicating the retirement service office.

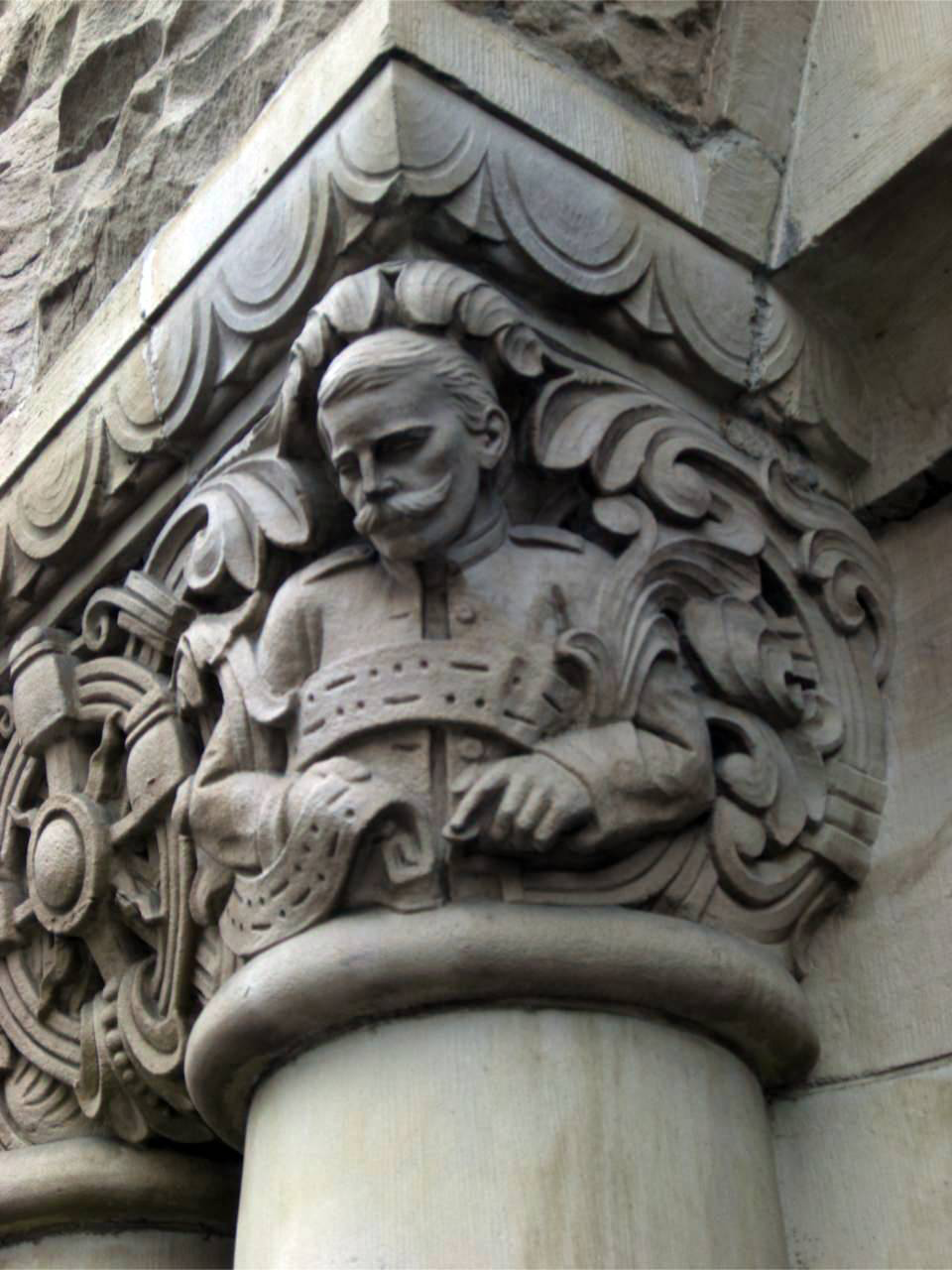
The telegraphist, facade capital indicating the communications office.

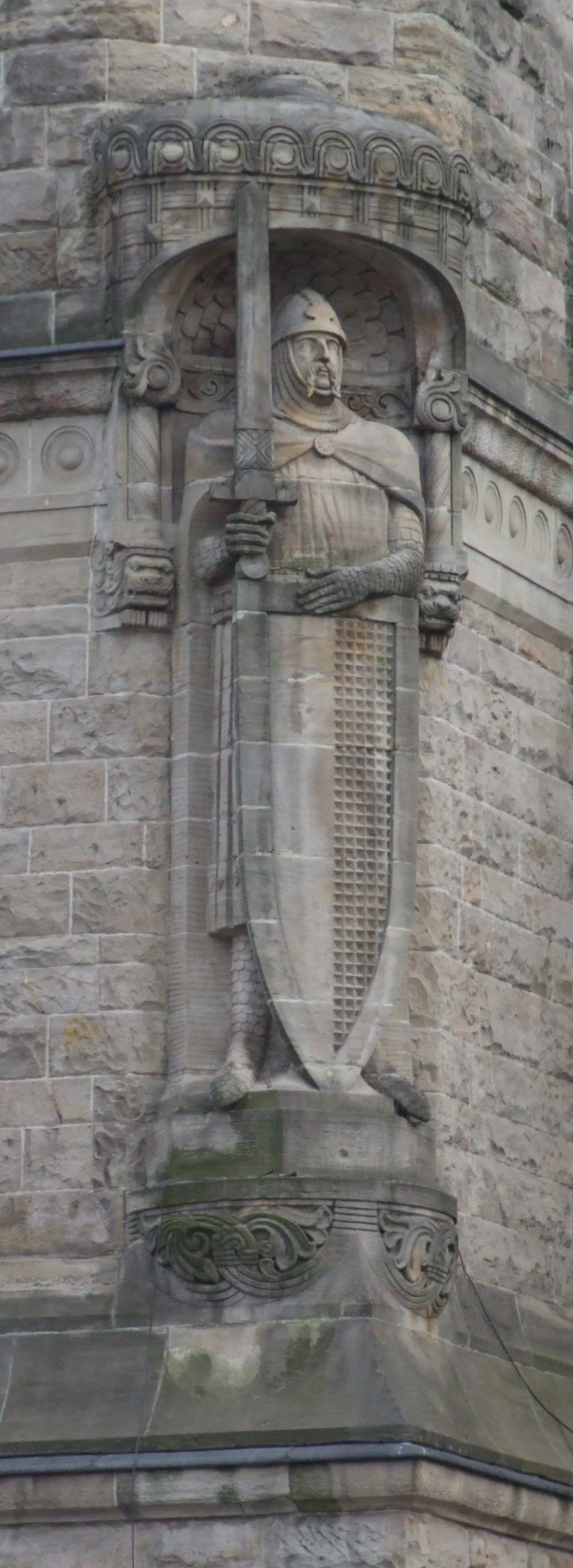
Knight Roland holding a shield with the blazon of Metz (a variation on a Roland statue).

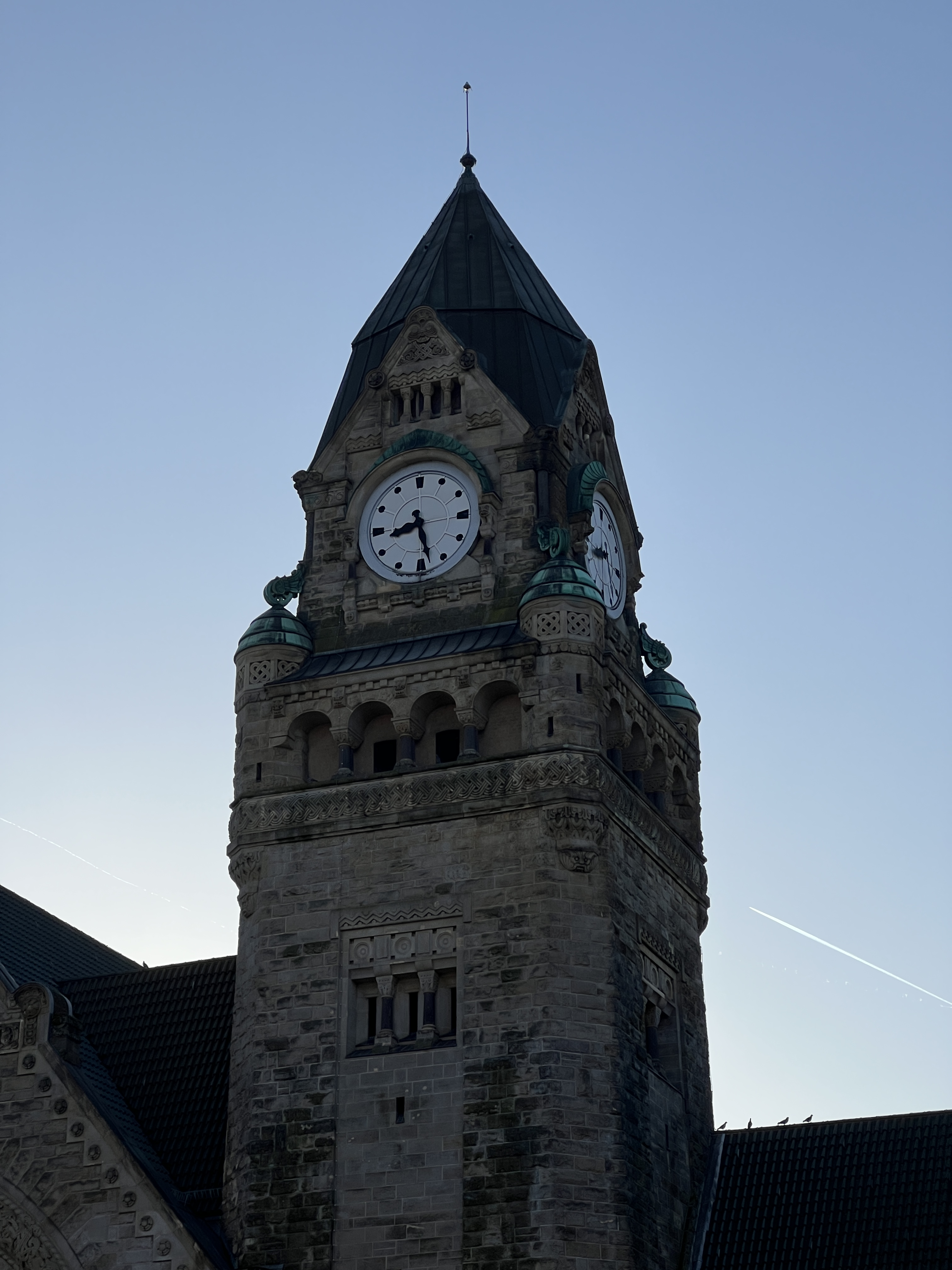
The clock tower designed by Kaiser Wilhelm II.

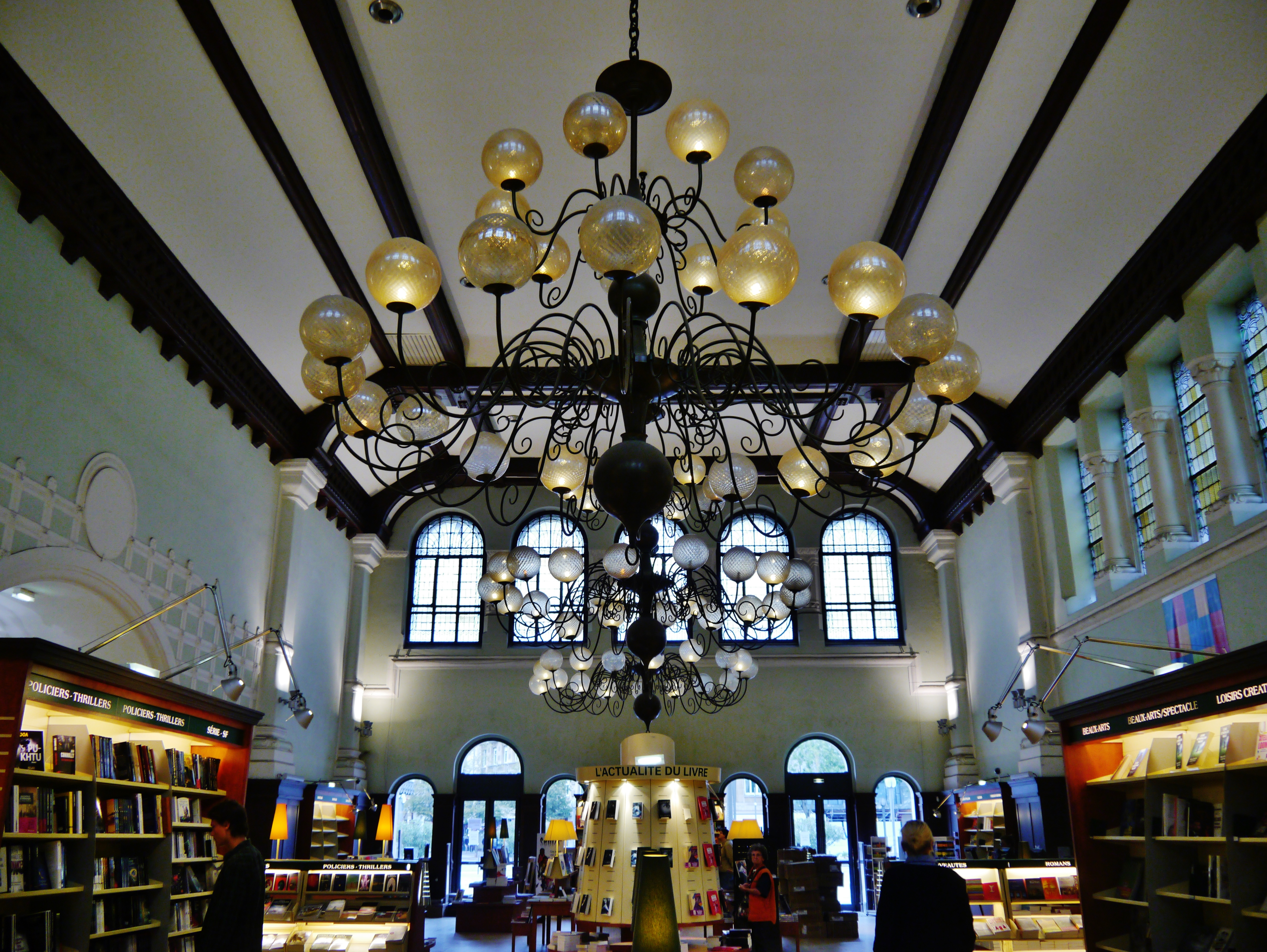
Interior of the former station restaurant, converted into a bookstore. (2009)

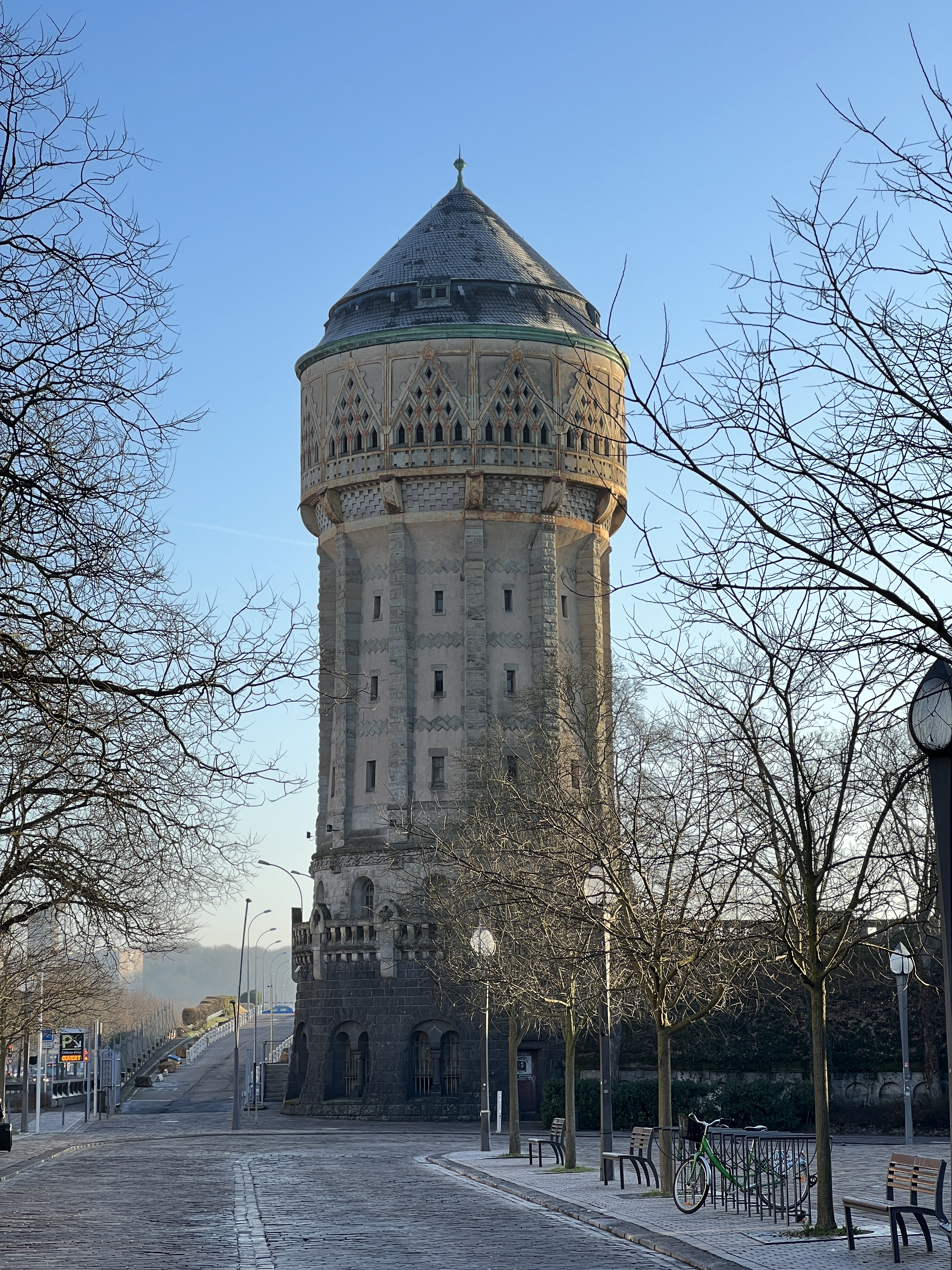
The water tower.

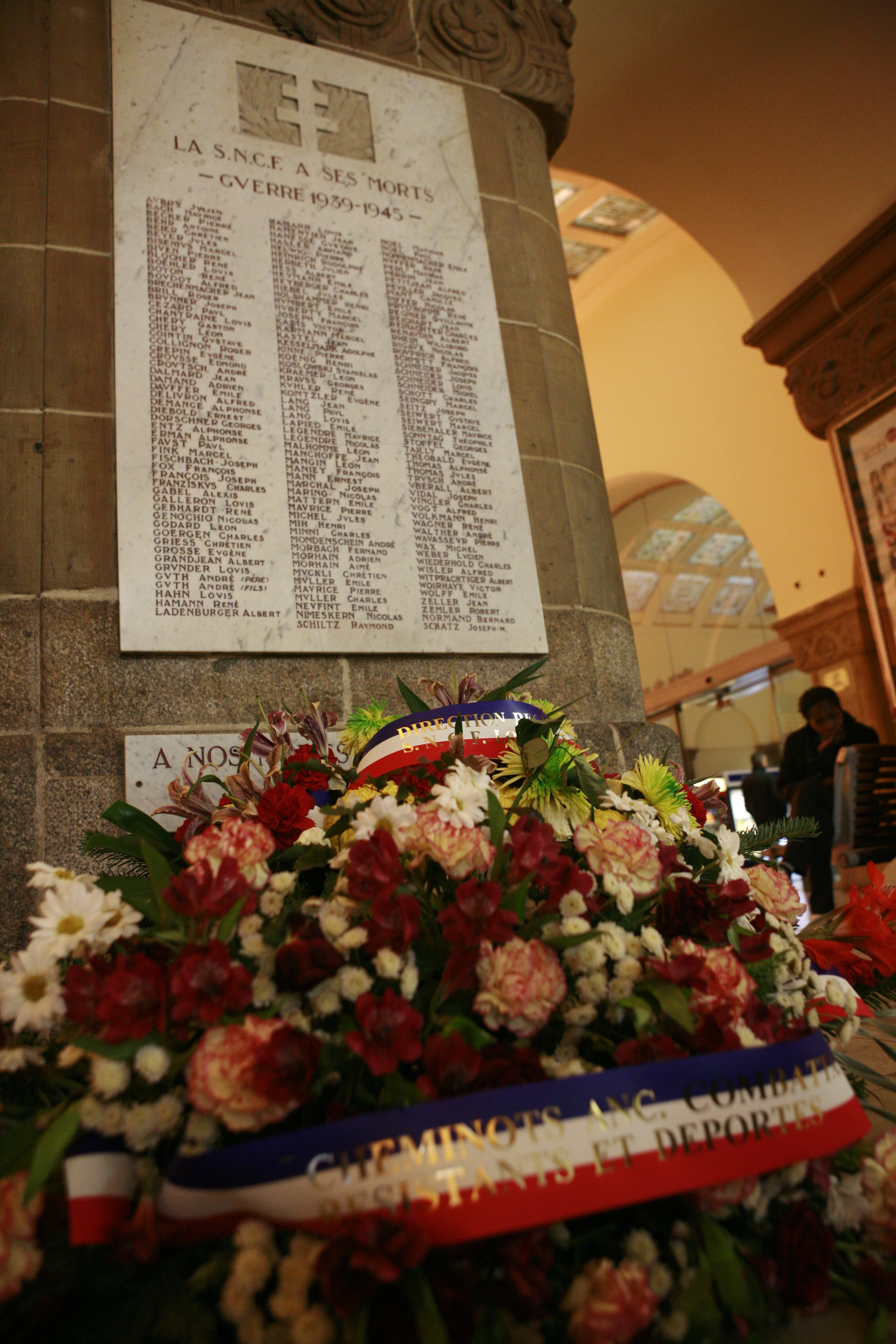
Commemorative plate for the Lorraine, dead railwaymen of the French resistance.

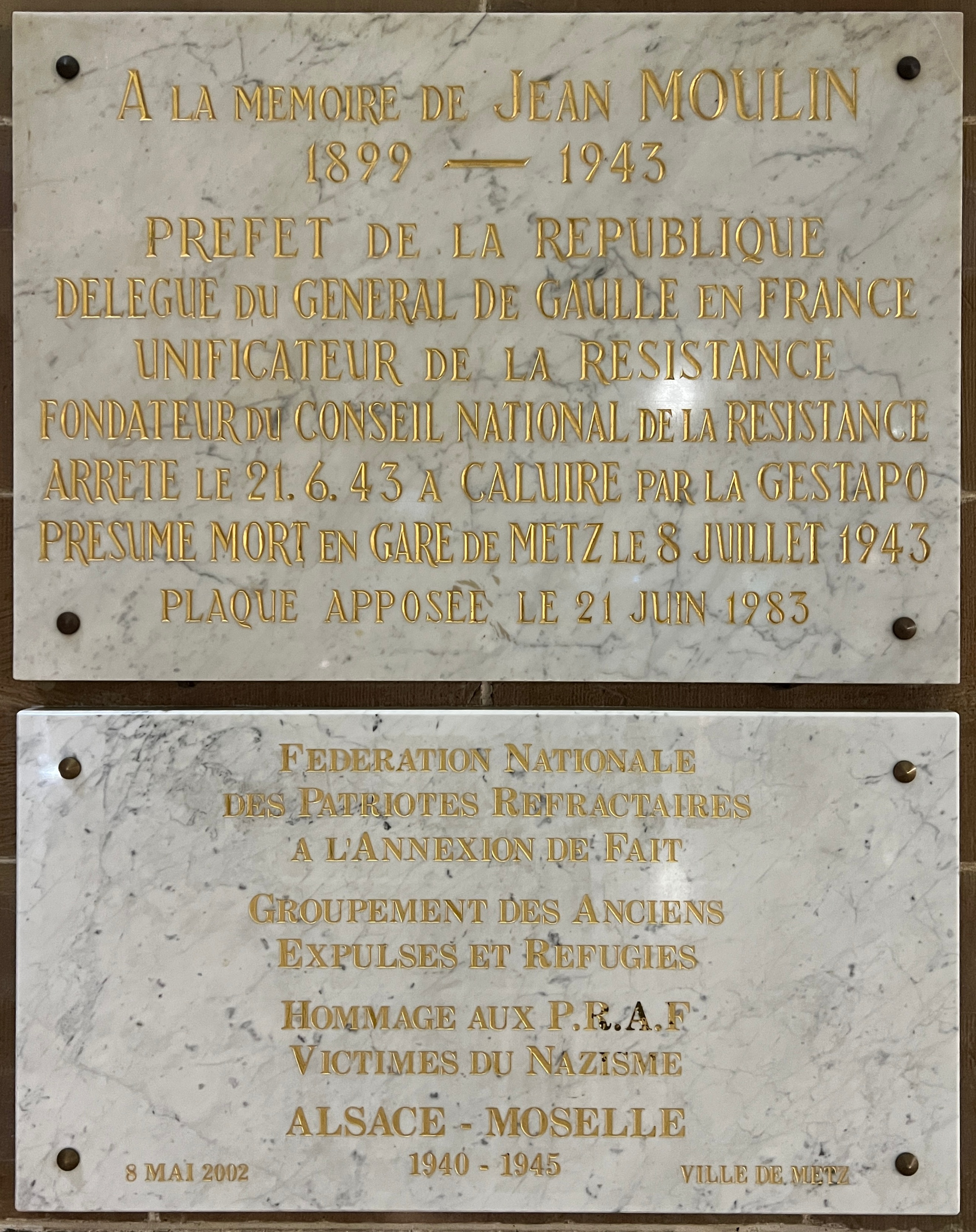
Tribute to French Resistance leader Jean Moulin in the hall of the railway station, in which he is believed to have died.
