= Thionville station =

French railway station

Coordinates: 49°21′13″N 6°10′11″E

Thionville
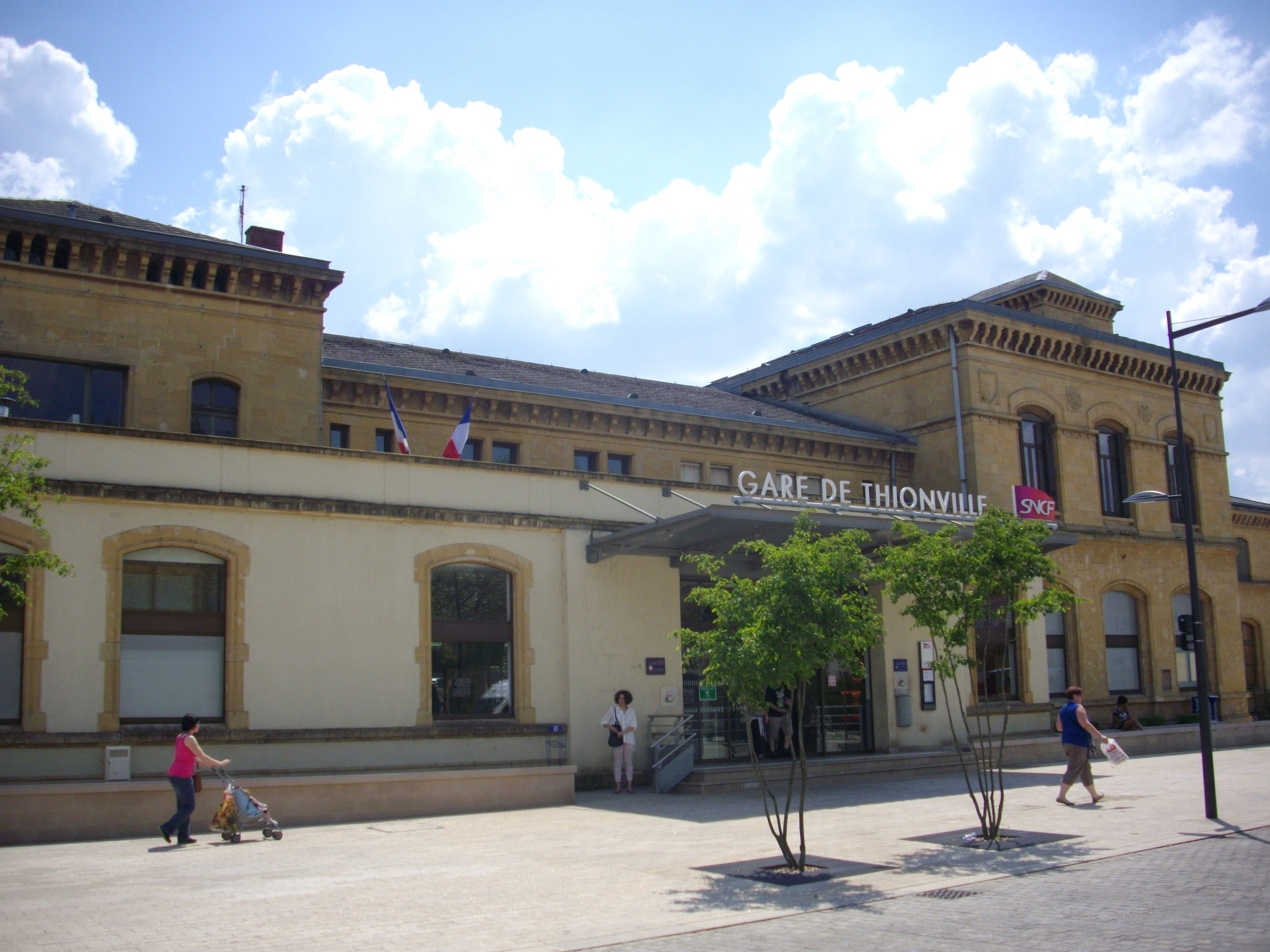

General information
- Location: 10 Place de la Gare; Thionville 57100; Moselle, France
- Elevation: 155 m (509 ft)
- Owner: SNCF
- Operator: SNCF
- Platforms: 3
- Tracks: 5

Other information
- Station code: 87191007

History
- Opened: 16 September 1854

Passengers
- 2024: 3,769,292

Services
Preceding station	SNCF	Following station
Metz-Ville towards Paris-Est	TGV inOui	Luxembourg Terminus
Preceding station	TER Grand Est	Following station
Uckange towards Metz	L01b	Hettange-Grande towards Luxembourg
Metz Terminus	L02	Basse-Ham towards Trier Hbf
Hayange towards Longwy	L27	Terminus
Location

The Gare de Thionville is a railway station serving the town of Thionville in the Moselle department, Lorraine, north-eastern France. It is situated on four railways including the Metz–Luxembourg railway and the Thionville–Trier railway.

== Services ==
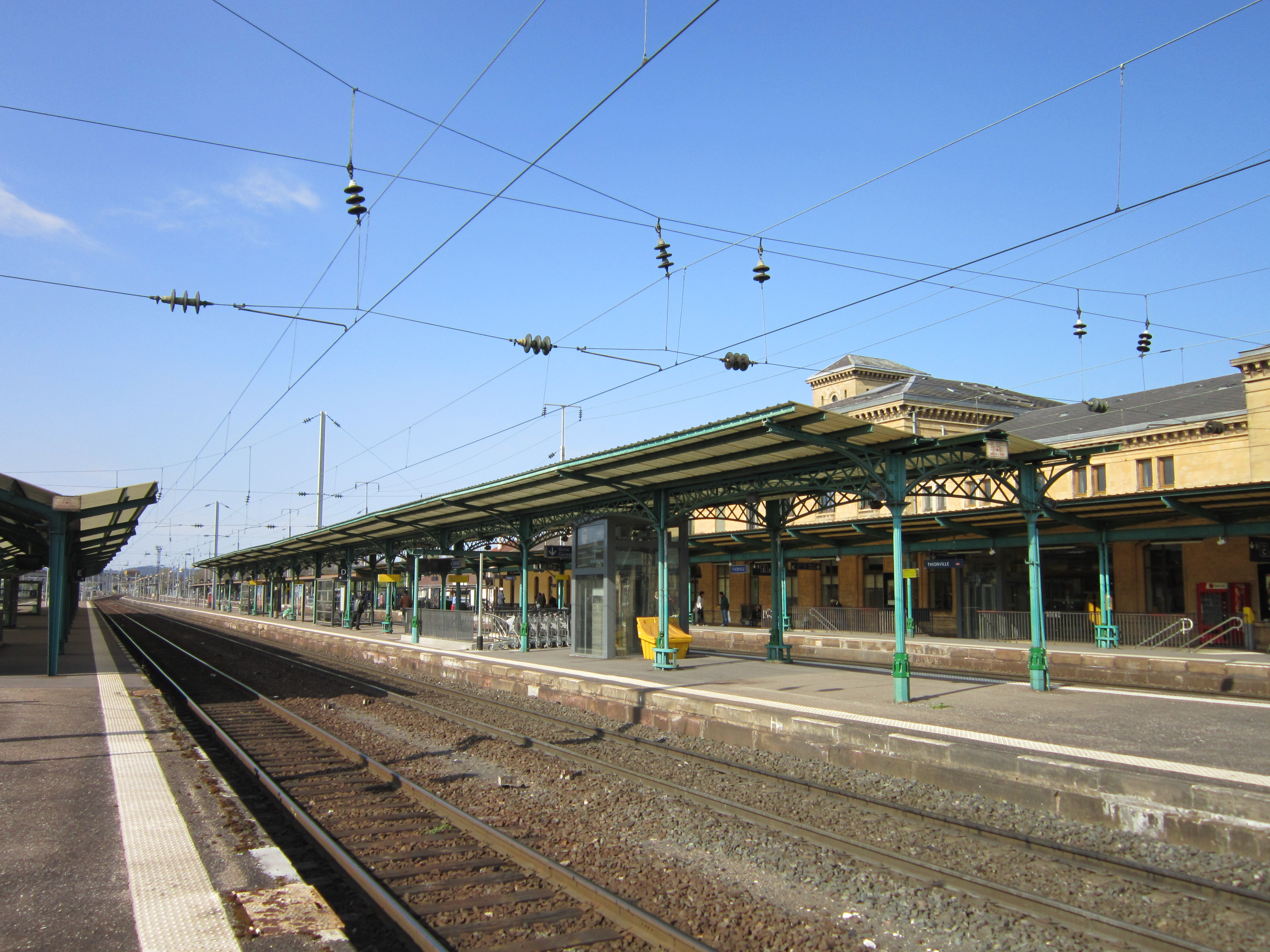
Platforms of the station

The station is served by high speed trains towards Luxembourg and Paris, and regional trains towards Metz, Trier, Luxembourg and Longwy.
