= Erfurt Nord station =

Railway station in Erfurt, Germany

Erfurt Nord
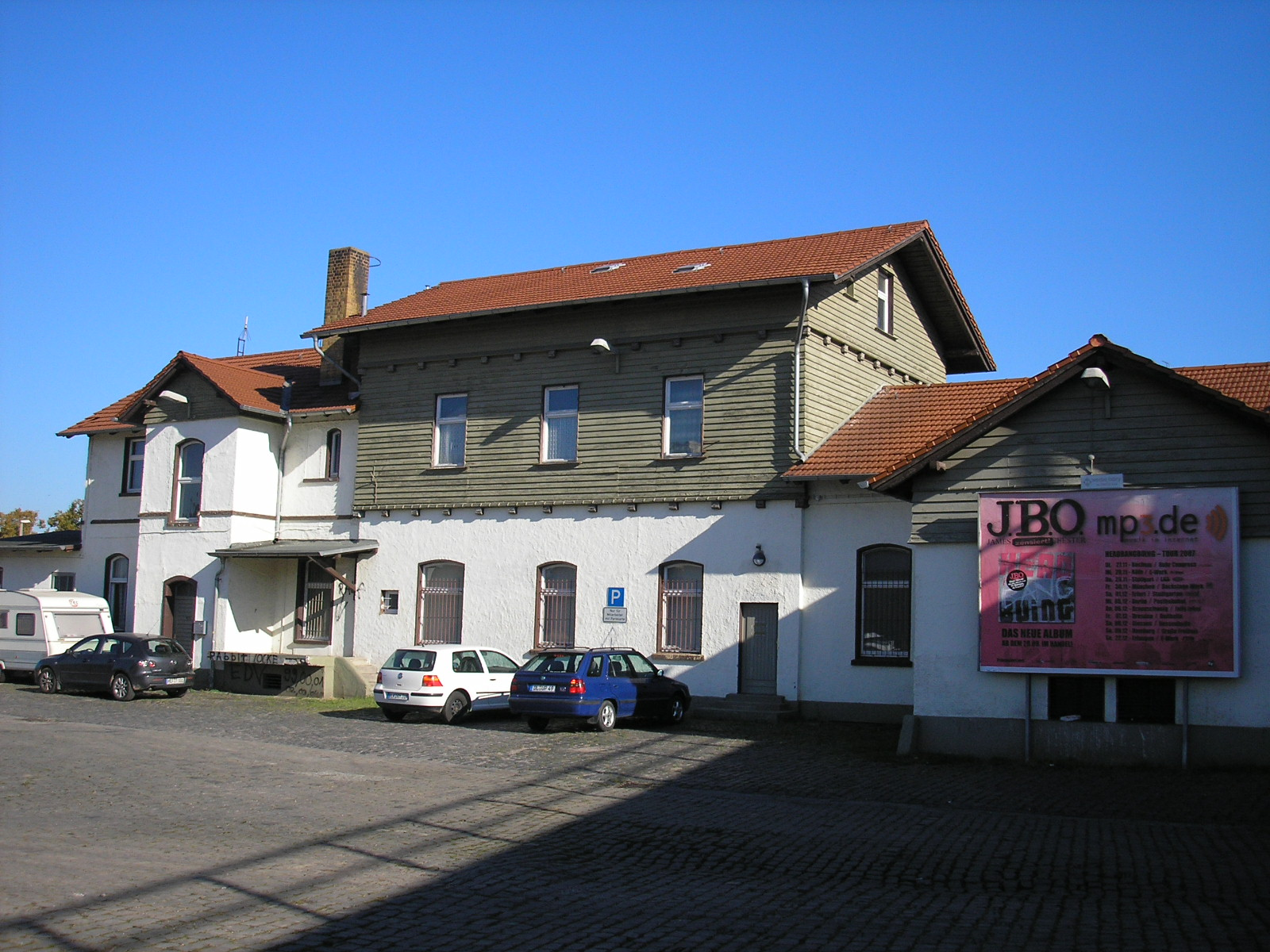
- 2007

General information
- Location: Magdeburger Allee 179; 99086 Erfurt; Thuringia; Germany
- Coordinates: 51.0033°N 11.0293°E
- System: Bf
- Owner: DB Netz
- Operator: DB Station&Service
- Lines: Wolkramshausen–Erfurt railway (KBS 601); Erfurt–Nottleben light railway
- Platforms: 2 side platforms
- Tracks: 3
- Train operators: DB Regio Südost

Other information
- Station code: 1635
- DS100 code: UEN
- IBNR: 8010102
- Category: 5
- Fare zone: VMT
- Website: www.bahnhof.de

Services
Preceding station	DB Regio Südost	Following station
Erfurt Hbf Terminus	RE 55	Erfurt-Gispersleben towards Nordhausen
Erfurt Hbf Terminus	RE 56	Ringleben-Gebesee towards Nordhausen
Erfurt Hbf Terminus	RB 52	Erfurt-Gispersleben towards Leinefelde
Location
- Location within Thuringia Location within Germany Location within Europe

Erfurt Nord station is a railway station in the northern part of Erfurt, capital city of Thuringia, Germany.
