= Erfurt Ost station =

Railway station in Erfurt, Germany

Erfurt Ost
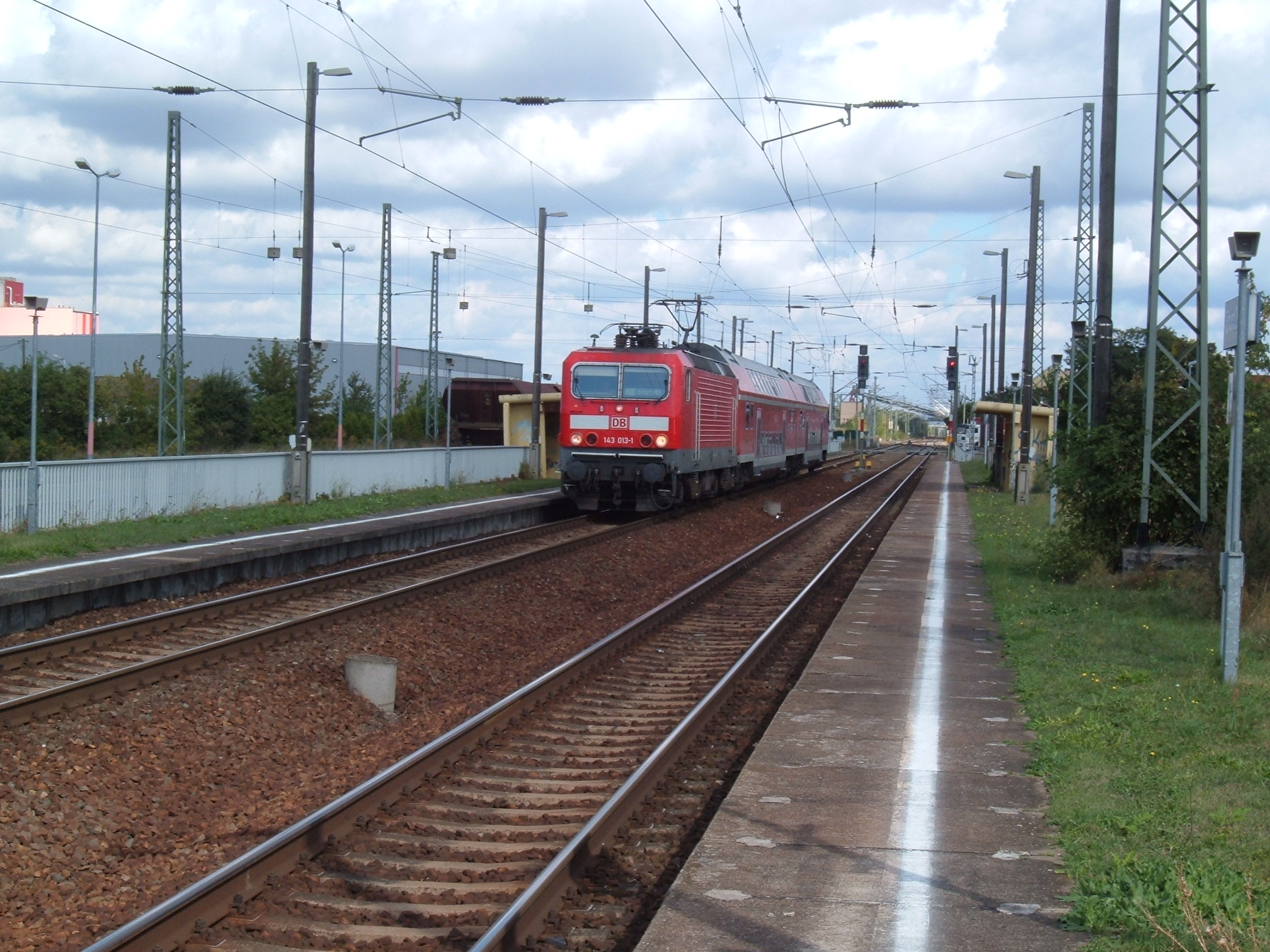
- 2012

General information
- Location: Schwerborner Straße 6a 99086 Erfurt; Thuringia; Germany
- Coordinates: 51.0143°N 11.0439°E
- System: Bf
- Owner: DB Netz
- Operator: DB Station&Service
- Lines: Sangerhausen–Erfurt railway (KBS 335)
- Platforms: 2 side platforms
- Tracks: 2
- Train operators: Abellio Rail Mitteldeutschland

Other information
- Station code: 1636
- DS100 code: UEO
- IBNR: 8011500
- Category: 6
- Fare zone: VMT
- Website: www.bahnhof.de

Services
Preceding station	Abellio Rail Mitteldeutschland	Following station
Erfurt Hbf Terminus	RE 10 selected trains only	Stotternheim towards Magdeburg Hbf
Erfurt Hbf Terminus	RB 59	Stotternheim towards Sangerhausen
Location
- Location within Thuringia Location within Germany Location within Europe

Erfurt Ost station is a railway station in the eastern part of Erfurt, capital city of Thuringia, Germany.
