= Sangerhausen–Erfurt railway =

Railway line in Germany

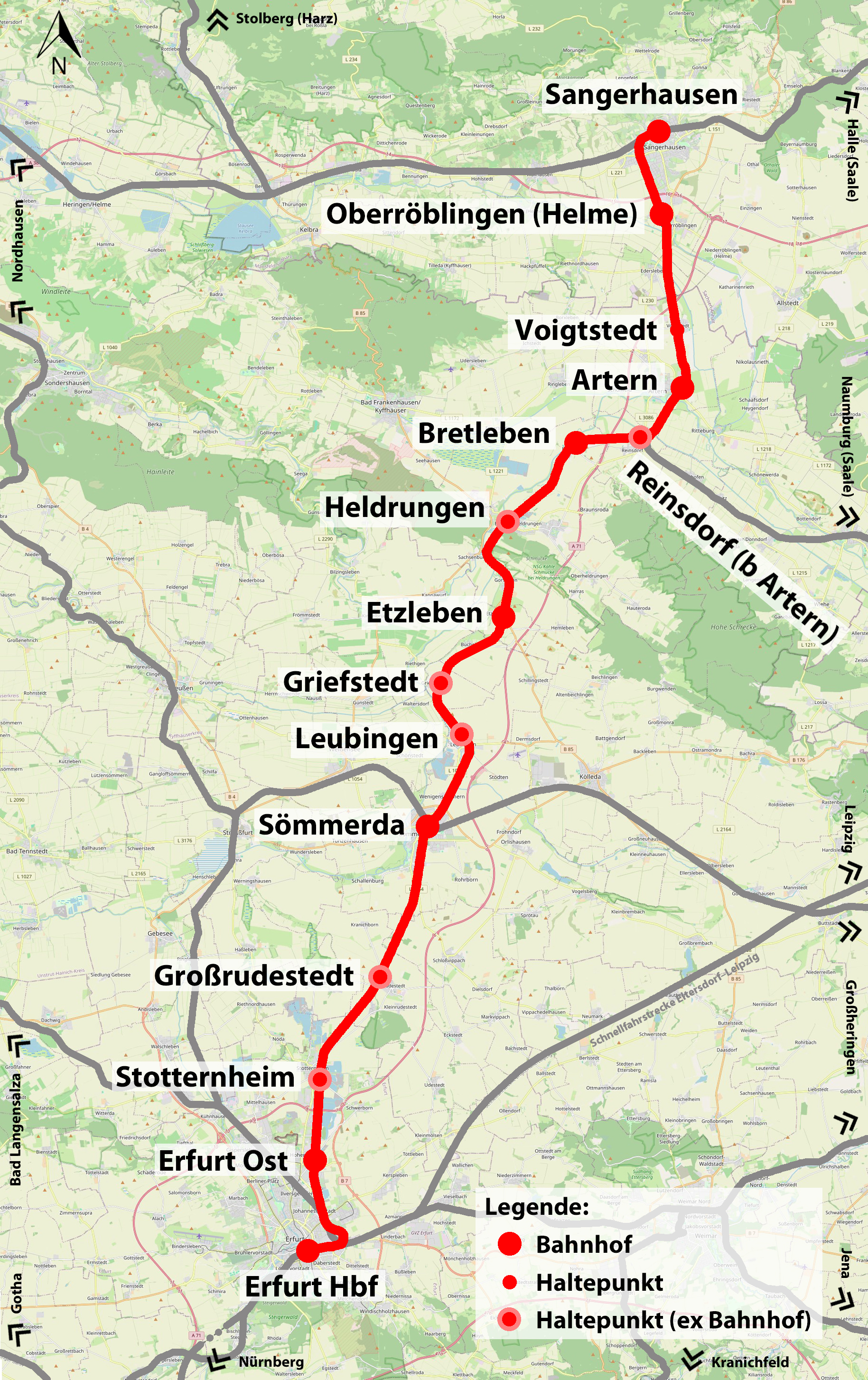
- Map

Overview
- Line number: 6300
- Locale: Thuringia, Germany

Service
- Route number: 335

Technical
- Line length: 69.7 km (43.3 mi)
- Number of tracks: 2: Sangerhausen–Artern; 2: Sömmerda–Erfurt
- Track gauge: 1,435 mm (4 ft 8 1/2 in) standard gauge
- Electrification: 15 kV/16.7 Hz AC overhead catenary

The Sangerhausen–Erfurt railway is a two-track, electrified railway, which is located mainly in the north of the German state of Thuringia; a small section is in southwestern Saxony-Anhalt. It represents the southern section of the Erfurt–Magdeburg(–Berlin) connection, the shortest regional connection between these major Thuringian and Saxony-Anhalt cities. The timetable number of 335 applies to the whole route from Erfurt to Magdeburg, including the Sangerhausen–Erfurt section.

== Route ==
The railway starts in Sangerhausen on the southern edge of the Harz in Saxony-Anhalt. After having crossed the Thuringian border a few kilometres to the south, it reaches Artern on the Unstrut. The line crosses the Unstrut and follows the river through the Diamantene Aue lowlands to the Thüringer Pforte (Thuringian Gate) at Heldrungen. Beyond this gorge of the Unstrut, between the ridges of Hainleite to the west and Schmücke to the east, the line enters the Thuringian Basin. It passes through agricultural lowlands via Sömmerda to Erfurt.

== History ==
The railway line was built by the Magdeburg–Halberstadt Railway Company (Magdeburg-Halberstädter Eisenbahngesellschaft). It was opened in 1880, with the first section opened from Sangerhausen to Artern on 15 July. The second section was opened from Artern to Erfurt on 24 October 1881. The line then became the third north-south link between central Thuringia and Saxony-Anhalt and the Harz region. Previously completed were the Thuringian Railway from Halle in the east and the Wolkramshausen–Erfurt railway in the west. It served above all the traffic between Magdeburg (then capital of the Prussian Province of Saxony and Erfurt (then seat of a government district and the third largest city in the Province of Saxony). It was taken over by the Prussian government in 1886. A second track was built between Erfurt and Sömmerda, but the second track was dismantled in 1946 to provide reparations. The railway was modernised and electrified at the end of the 1990s. The Sangerhausen–Artern and Sömmerda–Erfurt sections are now double-track.

== Operations ==
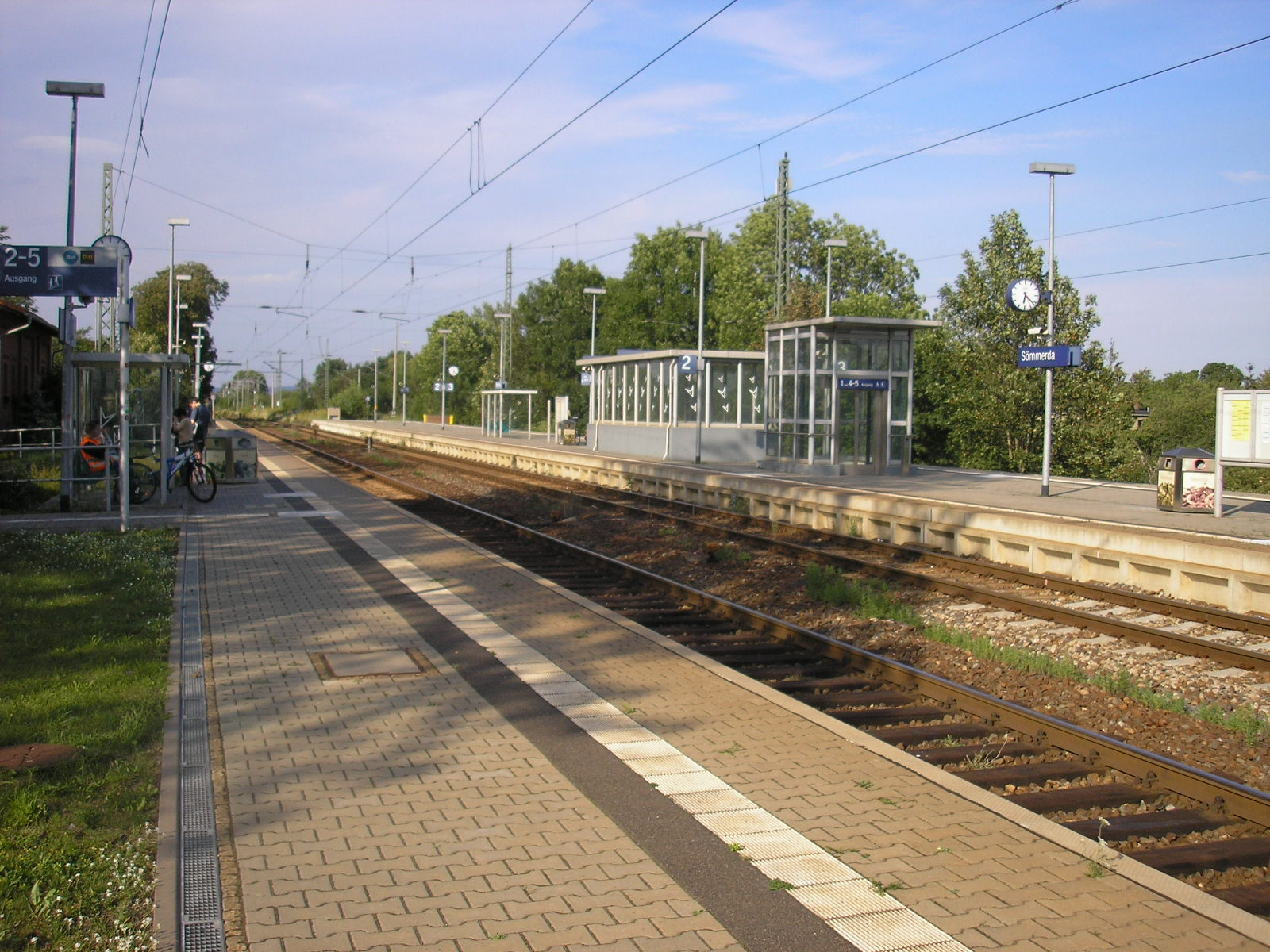
Sömmerda station

In passenger transport, two services now operate on 120-minute cycles, jointly providing an hourly service.

The Regional-Express 10 (Magdeburg–Erfurt) service is operated by DB Regio with Siemens Desiro Classic (class 642) diesel multiple units and the Regionalbahn 59 (Sangerhausen–Erfurt) service is operated by Abellio Rail Mitteldeutschland with Talent 2 electric multiple units.

Freight trains are operated particularly in through traffic (as an alternative route from Halle/Leipzig to Erfurt) and to Erfurt Ost (industrial siding) and Sömmerda (to and from the Mercedes-Benz car engine works in Kölleda).

== Others ==
Since December 2015, Reinsdorf station has been served only during the evening and on weekends and public holidays.
