= Erfurt Hauptbahnhof =

Railway station in Erfurt, Germany

Erfurt Hbf
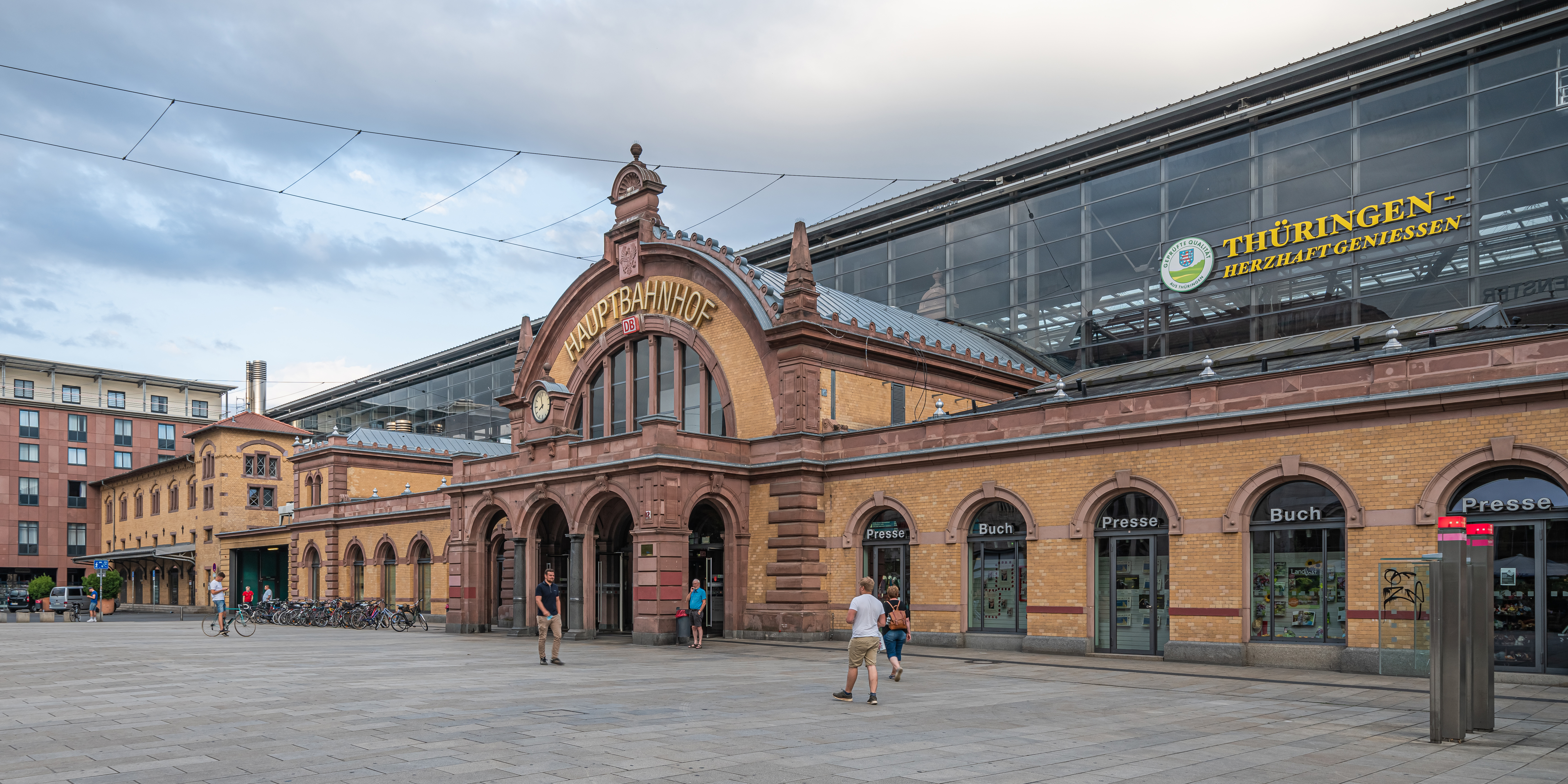
- Entrance hall of station building

General information
- Location: Willy-Brandt-Platz 12, Erfurt, Thuringia; Germany
- Coordinates: 50°58′22″N 11°2′16″E
- Owner: Deutsche Bahn
- Operator: DB InfraGO
- Lines: Thuringian Railway (KBS 580, KBS 605); Erfurt–Sangerhausen (KBS 595); Erfurt–Nordhausen (KBS 601); Erfurt–Leipzig/Halle (KBS 580); Erfurt–Nuremberg (from December 2017)
- Platforms: 10

Construction
- Accessible: Yes
- Architect: Gössler Kinz Kreienbaum Architekten BDA (new parts)
- Architectural style: Historicism (old parts); modern glass architecture (new parts)

Other information
- Station code: 1634
- DS100 code: UE
- IBNR: 8010101
- Category: 2
- Fare zone: VMT
- Website: www.bahnhof.de

History
- Opened: 1846; 180 years ago

Passengers
- 34,000

Services
Preceding station	DB Fernverkehr	Following station
Eisenach Hbf towards München Hbf	ICE 11	Halle (Saale) Hbf towards Berlin Gesundbrunnen
Eisenach Hbf towards München Hbf	ICE 11	Leipzig Hbf towards Berlin Gesundbrunnen
Frankfurt (Main) Hbf towards Saarbrücken Hbf	ICE 15	Halle (Saale) Hbf towards Ostseebad Binz
Gotha One-way operation	ICE 15	Halle (Saale) Hbf towards Ostseebad Binz
Coburg towards München Hbf	ICE 18	Halle (Saale) Hbf towards Berlin Gesundbrunnen or Hamburg-Altona
Coburg towards München Hbf	ICE 18	Leipzig Hbf towards Berlin Gesundbrunnen
Leipzig Hbf towards Hamburg-Altona	ICE 28	Bamberg towards München Hbf
Halle (Saale) Hbf towards Berlin Hbf	ICE 29 Sprinter	Nürnberg Hbf towards München Hbf
Leipzig Hbf towards Dresden Hbf	ICE 50	Gotha towards Wiesbaden Hbf
Halle (Saale) Hbf towards Berlin-Gesundbrunnen	ICE 91	Coburg towards Wien Hbf
Weimar towards Gera Hbf	IC 51	Gotha towards Kassel-Wilhelmshöhe, Köln Hbf or Düsseldorf Hbf
Fulda towards Zürich HB	EC 12N	Leipzig Hbf towards Praha hl.n.
Preceding station		Following station
Halle (Saale) Hbf towards Berlin Hbf	FLX 10	Gotha towards Stuttgart Hbf
Preceding station	DB Regio Südost	Following station
Neudietendorf towards Göttingen	RE 1	Weimar towards Glauchau (Sachs)
Döllstädt towards Kassel-Wilhelmshöhe	RE 2	Terminus
Terminus	RE 3	Weimar towards Altenburg or Greiz
Neudietendorf towards Würzburg Hbf	RE 7	Terminus
Terminus	RE 55	Erfurt Nord towards Nordhausen
Terminus	RE 56	Erfurt Nord towards Nordhausen
Terminus	RB 52	Erfurt Nord towards Leinefelde
Preceding station	DB Regio Bayern	Following station
Coburg Nord towards Nürnberg Hbf	RE 29	Terminus
Preceding station	Abellio Rail Mitteldeutschland	Following station
Terminus	RE 10	Stotternheim towards Magdeburg Hbf
Terminus	RE 16	Weimar towards Halle (Saale) Hbf
Erfurt-Bischleben towards Eisenach	RB 20	Vieselbach towards Leipzig Hbf
Terminus	RB 59	Erfurt Ost towards Sangerhausen
Preceding station		Following station
Terminus	RB 21	Vieselbach towards Gera Hbf
Terminus	RB 23	Erfurt-Bischleben towards Saalfeld (Saale)
Preceding station		Following station
Neudietendorf towards Ilmenau	RE 45	Terminus
Neudietendorf towards Meiningen	RE 50	Terminus
Neudietendorf towards Meiningen	RB 44	Terminus
Erfurt-Bischleben towards Ilmenau	RB 46	Terminus
Location

Erfurt Hauptbahnhof (Erfurt Hbf) or Erfurt Central Station is the central railway station at Erfurt in Germany. It is an important junction on the German rail network, served by numerous local and long-distance rail services. Immediately north of the station is Erfurt's city centre. The station was used by approximately 12.5 million passengers in 2006, an average of about 34,000 per day. The station lies on the Thüringer Bahn, which connects Halle to Bebra. It is served also by the Erfurter Bahn.

It was rebuilt from 2002 to 2008 for the completion of the Nuremberg–Erfurt high-speed railway and the Erfurt–Leipzig/Halle high-speed railway and connects the Berlin–Munich and Frankfurt–Dresden long-distance routes.

== Location in the city centre ==
Erfurt Hauptbahnhof is located in the district of Altstadt (old town), 500 metres (1,600 ft) south of the Anger (the Erfurt central square, literally, the village green), on the former fortress established in the 15th century. To the south, it borders on the districts of Löbervorstadt and Daberstedt. The marshalling yard and freight yard as well as the operating facilities of the Hauptbahnhof are located to the east in the Krämpfervorstadt. There and in Daberstedt there used to be numerous apartments for railwaymen. The station itself is bordered to the south by the Flutgraben (flood channel) and to the north by Willy-Brandt-Platz. Underneath the railway station is the station road, which is used by the city's public transport. It is used by tram lines 1, 3, 4, 5 and 6 as well as bus routes. Other buses run to the bus station located 150 metres northeast of the station in Bürgermeister-Wagner-Straße. In the adjacent Kurt-Schumacher-Straße there is car access to the station, parking lots, taxis ranks and the InterCityHotel. The old station hotel, the Erfurter Hof, was the location in March 1970 of the Erfurt Summit between Willy Brandt and Willi Stoph, the first meeting between leaders of East Germany and West Germany. Today it is used as a business centre.

== History ==
Erfurt Hauptbahnhof has experienced several new developments and reconstructions in the course of its history.

=== 1846–1890 station ===
The location of the first Erfurt station was controversial. Inside the Erfurt city walls there were only a very limited area available and outside the fortifications a suitable area was available in the Krämpfer field to the east of the Schmidtstedter Tore (gate). The Erfurt Mayor, Philippe Dressel, however, argued in favour of a location within the city fortification and the Prussian authorities and the military also demanded that the route of the railway line pass through the fortress ramparts, so that they could stop railway operations in crisis situations. In July 1845, the decision was finally taken to build the station within the fortifications, north of the hohen Batterie (high battery).

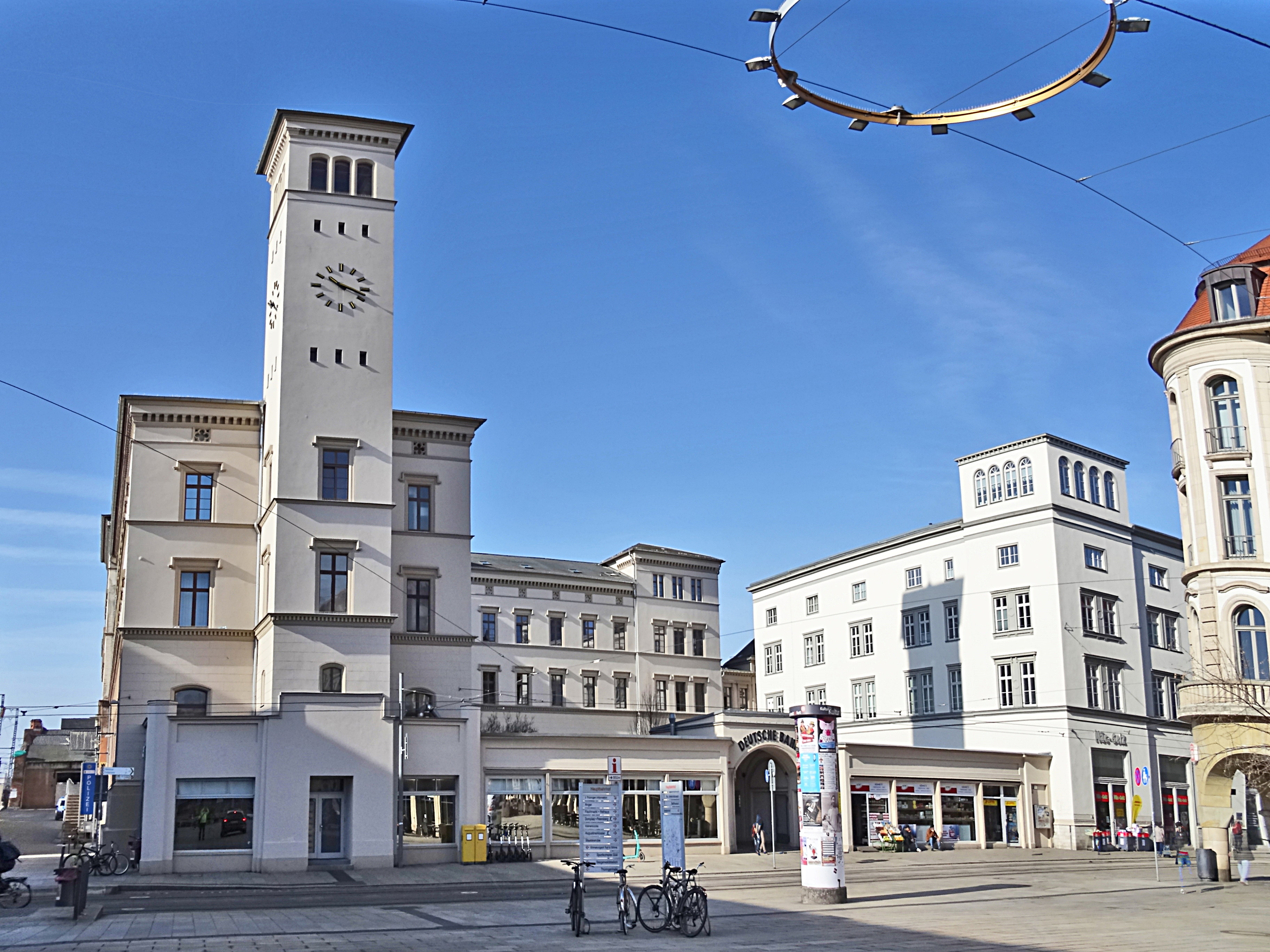
First station (1847–1890), late site of Erfurt marshalling yard

The first railway station was built in 1846 during the construction of the Thuringian Railway by the Thuringian Railway Company (Thüringische Eisenbahn-Gesellschaft). The location chosen meant that the construction of two double tunnels through the fortress wall and several wooden bridges across the moat would be required. It was opened with the Weimar–Erfurt line on 1 April 1847 with all buildings finished except for the entrance building, which was completed in 1852. Apart from the unfinished entrance building, the station had at its opening a locomotive building, a goods shed, a carriage shed, a coke shed, a shed for reserve locomotives and an operations workshop. Within a few years of its opening, the infrastructure was no longer sufficient for the growing needs. Two buildings, an additional goods sheds and a carriage shed, were planned in 1850 and completed in 1854. An enlargement of the locomotive shed was necessary in 1852 and the freight yard was expanded from 1855. One year later, the side wing of the workshop received another floor; the coke shed was converted into a locomotive shed together with a large turntable after the conversion of locomotive operations to coal.

A further expansion of freight transport facilities followed in 1860. The two existing freight sheds were expanded and a third was built. However, the lack of space within the fortifications grew increasingly noticeable, and the Thuringian Railway Company purchased a large area in front of the Schmidtstedter gate in 1865 to erect a freight yard. Due to the Austro-Prussian War of 1866, the start of construction was delayed and work only began in the following year. Freight sheds were built in 1871, allowing the freight yard to be opened in 1872, but it was only finally completed five years later in 1877.

The timetable at the opening of Erfurt Hauptbahnhof showed four trains running daily between Halle and Erfurt with a journey time of three to three and a half hours. Ten years later, in the summer of 1857, two express trains, three ordinary passenger trains, and one mixed train ran daily between Halle and Eisenach via Erfurt.

The Nordhausen-Erfurt Railway Company (Nordhausen-Erfurter-Eisenbahn-Gesellschaft) opened the Nordhausen–Erfurt railway on 17 August 1869. The Erfurt terminus was originally at the Nordhäuser Bahnhof (Nordhausen station) on the Schmidtstedter field; there existed from the outset a transfer railway to the station of the Thuringian Railway Company and from 1872 passenger trains continued through to its station. The Nordhäuser Bahnhof served freight traffic from then on and its entrance building is now used as a residential house. The Sangerhausen–Erfurt railway also originally ended at its own station, the Sangerhäuser Bahnhof, after the opening of the section to Erfurt on 24 October 1881. It was not far from the Nordhäuser Bahnhof and was integrated into the Thuringian station a few years later via the branch line of the Thuringian Railway to the Royal Salt Mine at Ilversgehofen. After that the Sangerhäuser Bahnhof was also exclusively used for freight transport.

The three-storey entrance building of the first Erfurt station is still preserved and is now used by Deutsche Bahn AG. It is located west of today's Hauptbahnhof and has a white/olive colour scheme. Previously, with the low buildings on Bahnhofstraße (station street), its tower was widely visible. The building operated from 1847 to 1890 and later became the seat of the railway division (Reichsbahndirektion) of Erfurt.

=== 1890–2002 station ===
The second station building was built as an island station from 1887 to the plans of the railway construction inspector (Eisenbahnbauinspektor) Eduard Keil and the government architect Otto Erlandsen and put into operation in 1893. It is located 30 metres east of the first station building and consisted of a station entrance hall on the station forecourt with shops and the ticket offices as well as the actual entrance building, which was located between the tracks. The buildings were designed in the style of Historicism, with yellow veneer walls and red sandstone walls and ceilings. The tracks were located on an embankment, the former fortress wall.

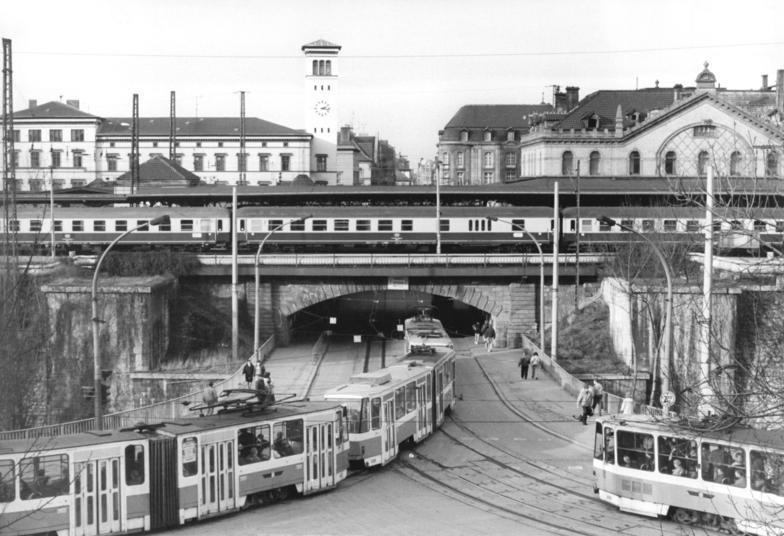
South-side 1990

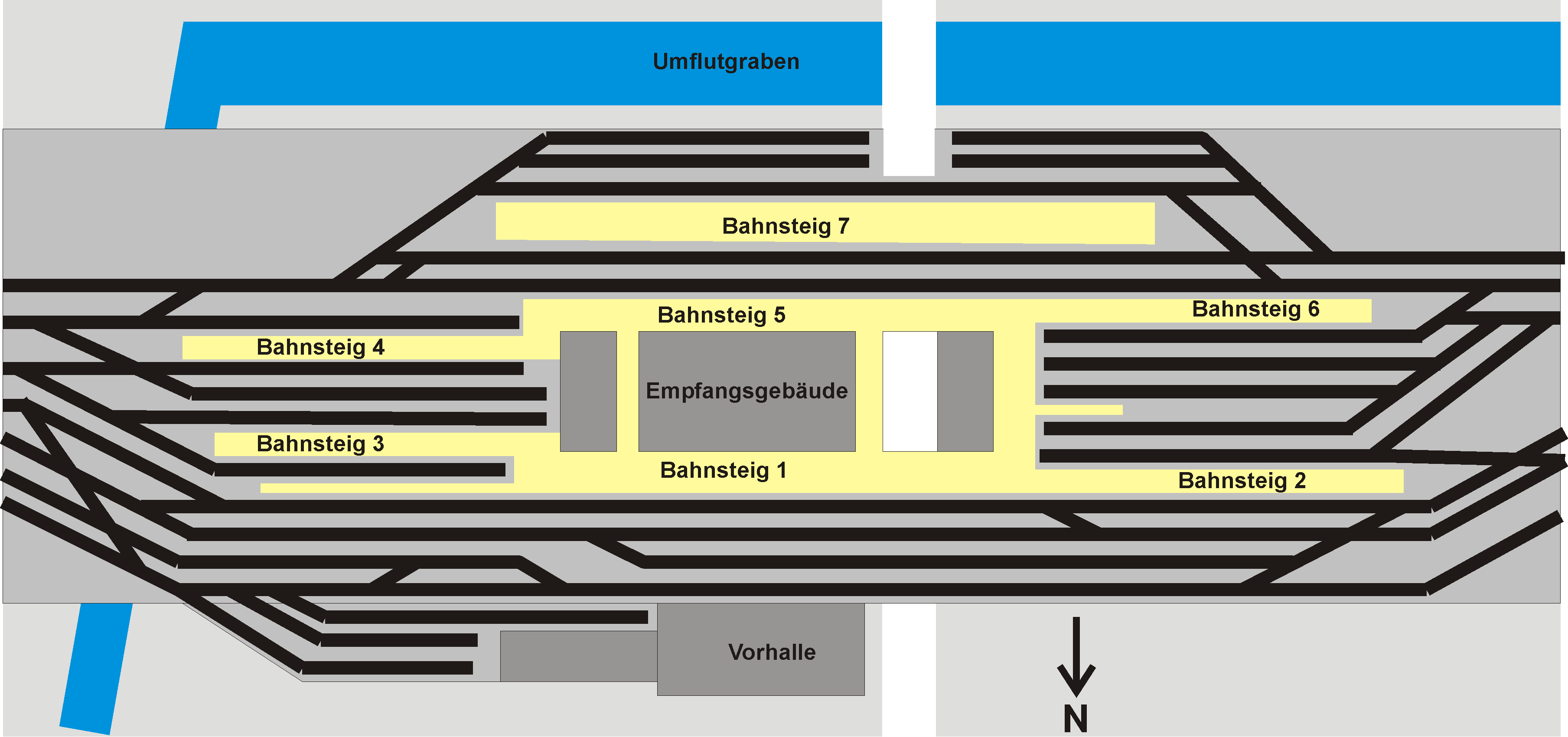
Track plan in 1957

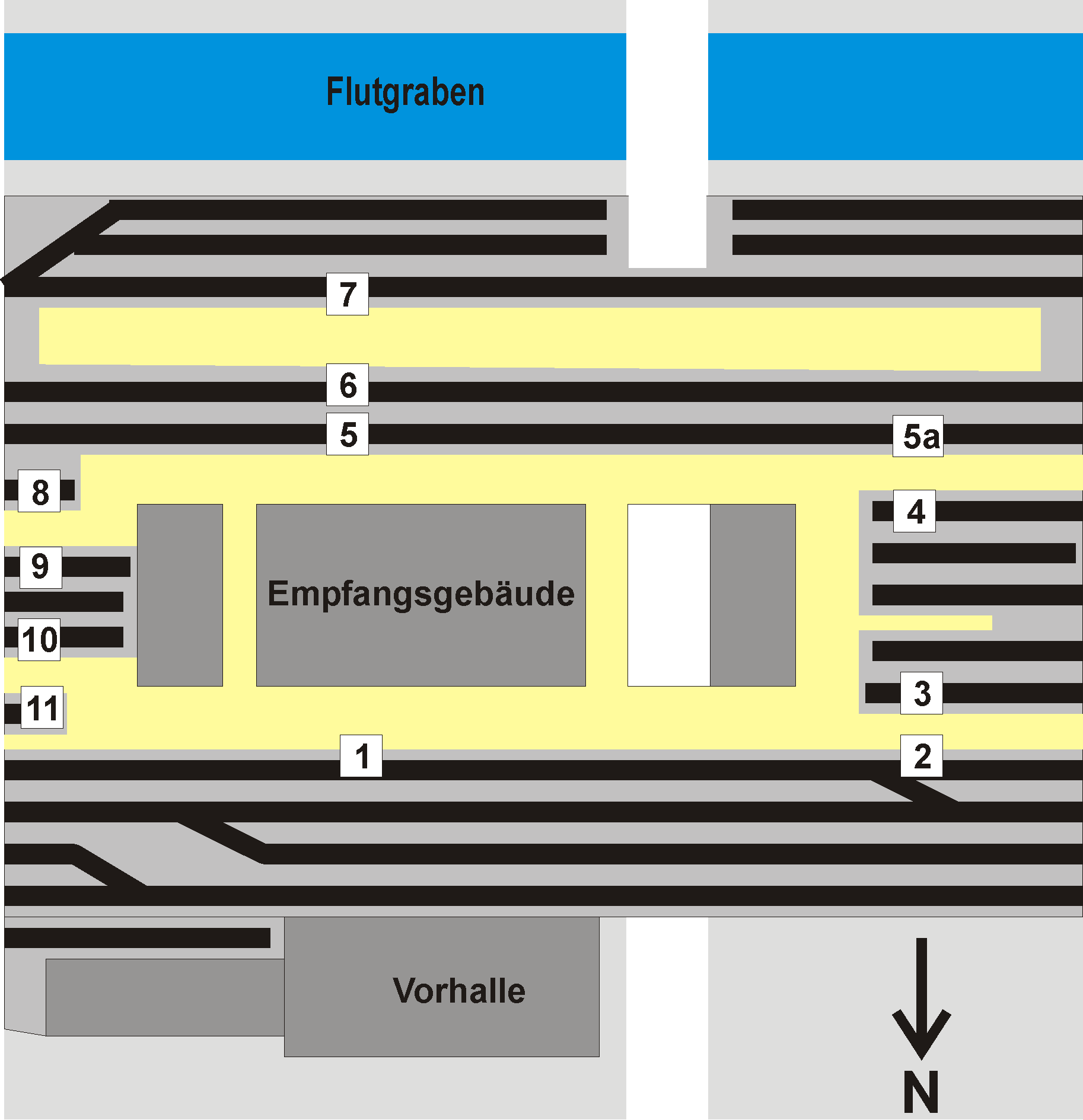
Platform numbers from 1975 to 2005

The station had a track on the south side of platform 5 and 6 for the through track for the main line from Bebra to Halle and on the north side of platform 1 and 2 for the track for the opposite direction. In 1912, an additional set of points was installed at platform 1, which made it possible to process two trains one after the other at platforms 1 and 2. In addition, there were two tracks, which were on the north side and served as transit routes for freight transport from Erfurt freight yard to Neudietendorf. The eastern bay platform 4 was used by trains to and from Sangerhausen and the adjacent bay platform 3 by trains to and from Nordhausen and Bad Langensalza. The western bay platforms 2 and 6 mostly served trains to and from Arnstadt and towards Suhl, Ilmenau or Saalfeld. In addition, on the south side, there was the island platform 7, with through tracks for trains heading east to Weimar, which was built in 1940/1941. The platform designation was valid until 1975. After that there was a new numbering system, giving each track at a platform its own number. In 1992, Deutsche Bundesbahn finally changed to using the term Gleis (track) instead of Bahnsteig (platform). This was, however, a bit problematic because the in-house track numbers used in the signalling technology did not correspond to the adopted track numbers.

The station had the "Ew" signal box on the southern side at its western entrance and the elevated "Er" signal box at the eastern exit. In addition between the tracks 5 and 8 there were the "mushroom" signal box "Es" as well as the small "Ev" signal box (Vogelnest—"bird's nest") in the entrance hall. The station tracks were electrified in 1967.

This second station building operated in its original form until 2000. Only the entrance hall, which has been integrated into the new, third station, still stands.

=== Station reconstruction ===
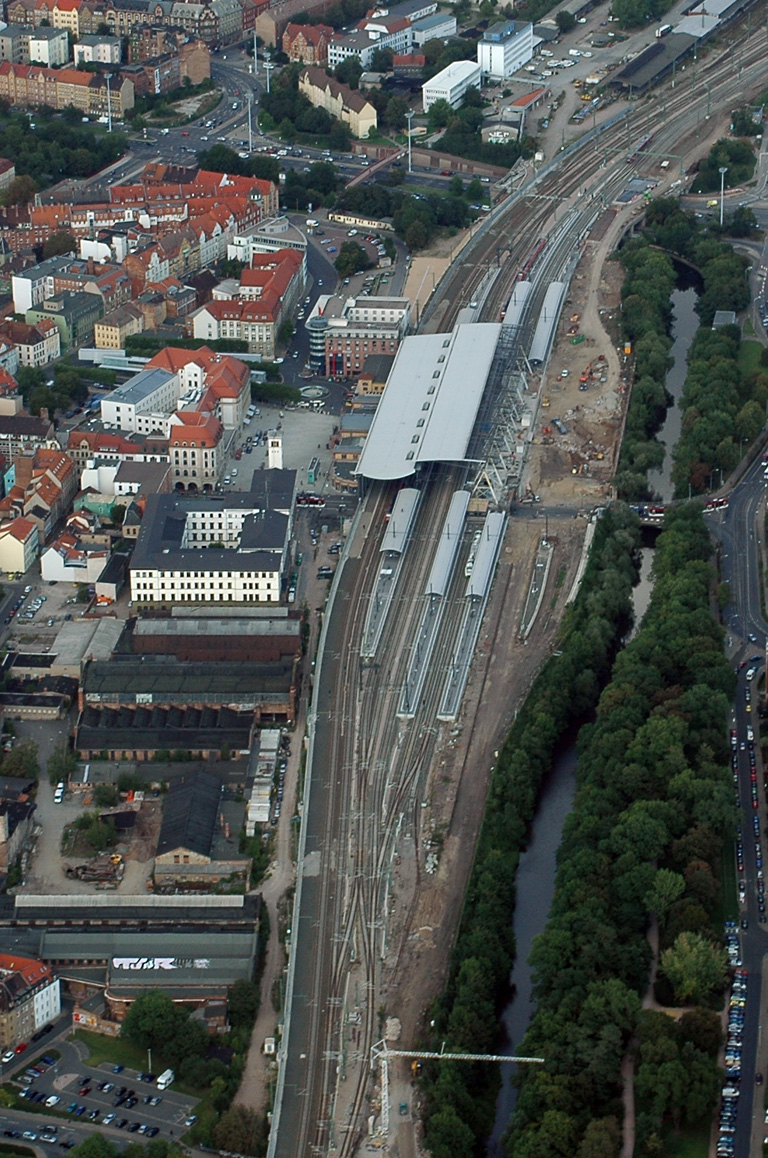
Construction in August 2007 (aerial photo)

The Zentrale Hauptverwaltung (ZHvDR—central headquarters) of Deutsche Reichsbahn was given the task of carrying out preliminary planning work at the Erfurt node on 18 August 1992. Planning work was then started. The preliminary planning documents were provided to ZHvDR for confirmation in mid-1993. They proposed a new electronic signalling centre, the renewal of 44 km (27 mi) tracks and 143 sets of points. 11 bridges in the urban area of Erfurt would be replaced or rehabilitated. The estimated cost of these measures was DM 439 million.

The station was comprehensively modernised from 2002—after the demolition of the historical island building, which gave the station its appearance until then—and was officially handed over to the traffic on 13 December 2008, although not all reconstruction work had yet been completed. The cost of the reconstruction would amount to about €260 million. The Free State of Thuringia and the City of Erfurt would contribute €44 million of this.

The planning approval for the reconstruction was given in the mid-1990s. The official groundbreaking was celebrated on 22 September 2001. The newly constructed track layout comprise 21 platform tracks at 12 platforms as well as 67 sets of points. Six railway bridges were built during the construction work. Underneath the station a shopping arcade has been built on an area of around 3,000 m^{2} (32,000 sq ft). Underneath this shopping arcade is an underground car park. Both facilities were reduced in size during the planning phase.

An open competition was held for the design of the new station. In the autumn of 1995, an eleven-member jury selected the winning plan for the station from a total of 123 submissions. Civil protests against the demolition of the historic island building, which was supported by a building historian of the Bauhaus University, Weimar, were not considered.

Planning approval was given for the reconstruction of the railway node in September 1995. The planned measures included five kilometres of track, 46 kilometres of overhead wires and the renewal of eight railway bridges.

The financing agreement for the reconstruction was concluded on 26 March 1998. The planned total costs were around DM 207 million. Work would start in the autumn of 1999 and be completed in 2003. An electronic interlocking for controlling the Erfurt rail node was put into operations before the start of the large-scale construction work on 14 March 1999. This replaced the eight relay, electro-mechanical and mechanical signal boxes, which were up to 92 years old and controlled by up to three train dispatchers, 155 sets of points, 154 signals and 119 repeater signals. This early completion had become necessary, as there was a ban had been placed on refurbishing the old signalling technology. Conceptually, the plan provided for a safety-related longitudinal separation of the station, in order to be able to carry out the rebuilding in stages. The electronic interlocking is now remote-controlled from the Leipzig signalling centre.

In October 2001, Vieselbach and Hopfgarten stations and three block posts were also connected to the Erfurt electronic interlocking.

The renovated entrance building went into operation on 21 August 2002 after eight months of construction. The construction works, which were then estimated to cost around €250 million were expected to be completed by 2006.

The extensive reconstruction of Erfurt Hauptbahnhof started in 2002. A comprehensive redesign of the track layout was carried out as well as the demolition of part of the existing entrance building and the underpass of Bahnhofstraße. As a result of the rebuilding, Erfurt Hauptbahnhof will be able to operate as a junction between the Nuremberg–Erfurt and Erfurt–Leipzig/Halle high-speed lines. A major goal of the planning was to link the ICE line between Munich and Berlin with the ICE line between Frankfurt am Main and Dresden and to reduce travel times by means of interchange.

In the meantime, the construction work was suspended for two years, when it was unclear whether the two high-speed lines projects connecting with Erfurt would be realised.

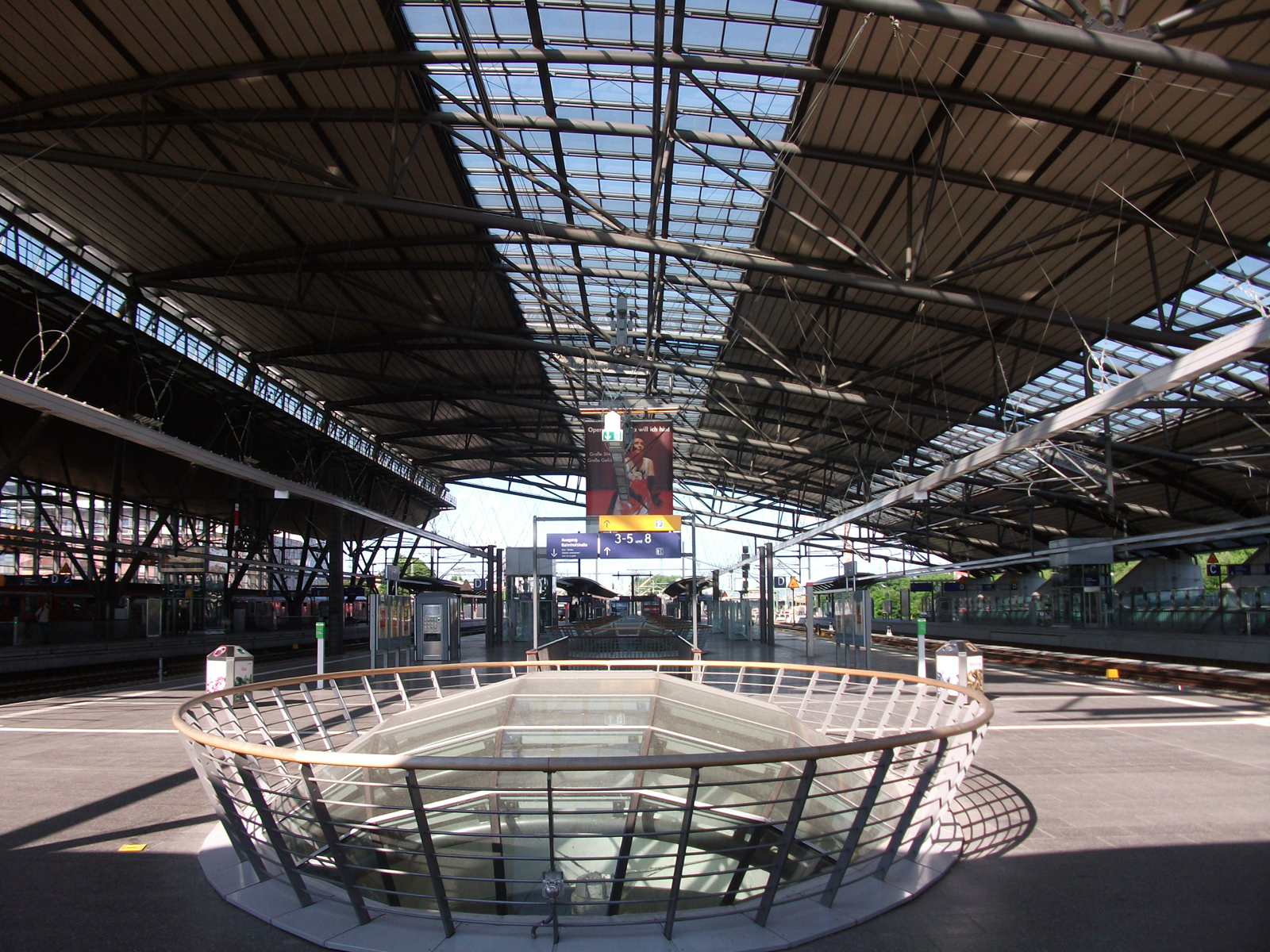
Inside the station

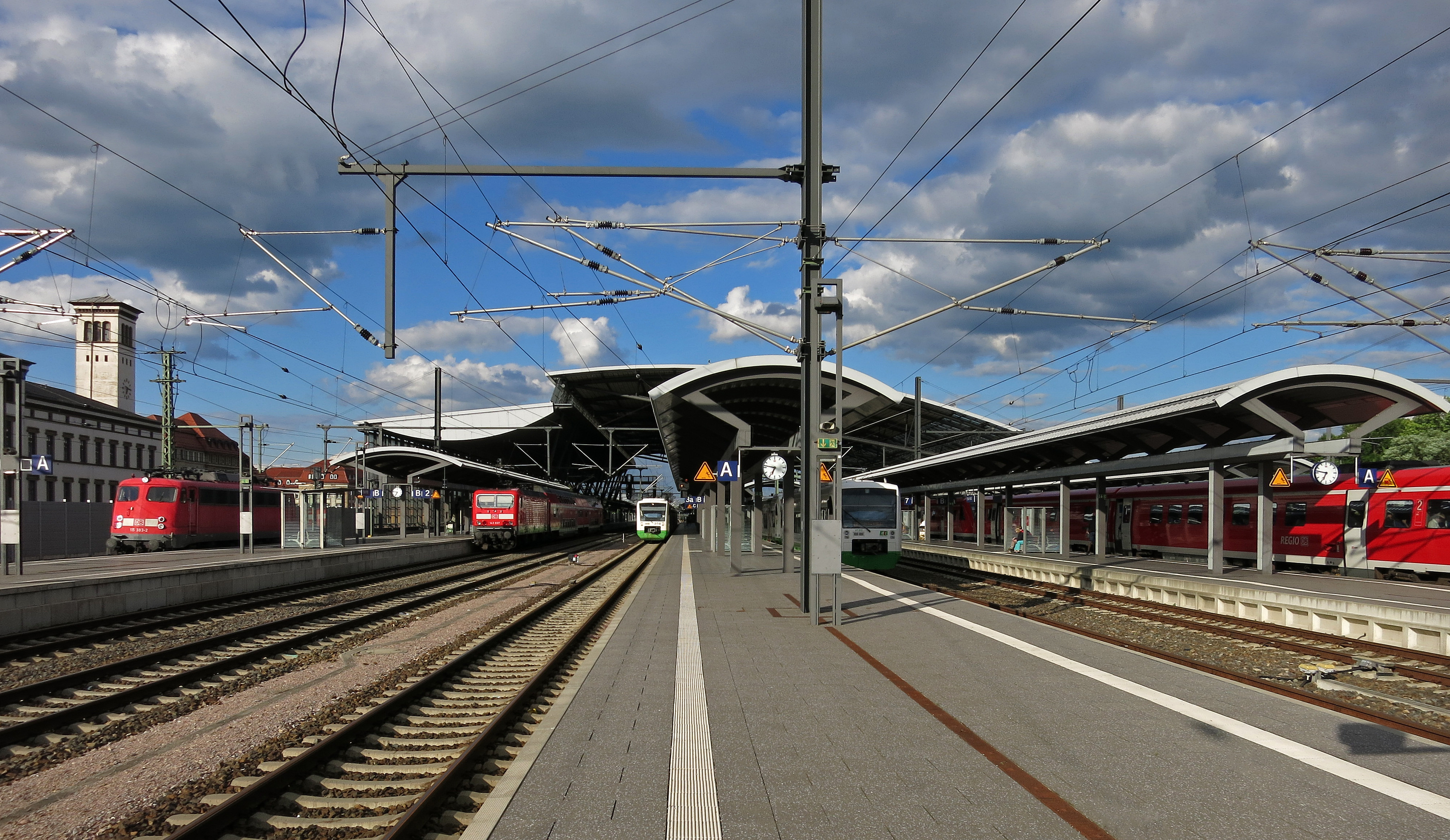
Erfurt Hbf. looking towards Halle in 2014

The new station was built in several stages, as train operations had to be fully maintained. A provisional platform for the additional track 7a was first built on the south side of the station. An island platform with nine through tracks and four bay platforms were built. The two outside located long-distance platforms 1/2 and 9/10 have a length of 420 metres (1,377 ft 11 in).

The two-aisled, 154-metre (505 ft 3 in) long hall roof consists of one side aisle that has a 20-metre (65 ft 7 in) wide span and another side aisle that has 65-metre (213 ft 3 in) wide span, with a maximum height of around 20 metres (65 ft 7 in). The originally planned length was 190 metres (623 ft 4 in). During the rebuilding of the around 2.5-kilometre (1.6 mi)-long rail junction area, soundproof walls with a total length of around 3.0 kilometres (1.9 mi) were also installed.

The converted entrance hall was opened in 2005 as a first part of the new railway station.

The north side of the main station was officially put into operation at the timetable change in December 2005. It consisted of a "half" glass hall on the upper floor, which spans the newly opened northern island platform with tracks 1 and 2 and partly the middle platform, as well as a shopping arcade on the ground floor and an underground car park.

At this time, the planned total costs were €260 million. These funds were supplied by the state of Thuringia, the city of Erfurt and Deutsche Bahn.

The next section was opened on 3 June 2007. Working to a 44-hour limit, the northern part of the platform with track 3 as well as the four new tracks 4 and 5 on the eastern platform and 6 and 7 on the western platform were put into operation. In the last phase of construction, the old southern part of the track area (old tracks 5, 6, 7 and 7a), including the old pedestrian overbridge, were demolished by March 2008. Then the rest of the glass roof construction and the platforms underneath were built with tracks 8, 9 and 10. Commissioning took place on 30 November 2008 after a 27-hour total blockade. In the process, the southern long-distance platform 9 was put into operation, first as a 320-metre (1,050 ft)-long bay platform without overhead wire, and platform 10 was opened with a provisional connection until two subsequent bridge structures were completed in the eastern exit.

At the end of May 2012, in a 64-hour possession, additional tracks for the high-speed lines were integrated east and west of the station with a length of 12 kilometres (7.5 mi). The platforms 9/10 were now connected in both directions and its full length of 420 metres (1,377 ft 11 in) was usable as an ICE platform. In addition, the new southern entrance to the Flutgraben was handed over and the waiting room was redesigned.

A crossing structure was built east of the station in Daberstedt to allow trains on the high-speed to Leipzig to pass over the tracks of the lines from Sangerhausen and Wolkramshausen. At Pentecost 2013, the structure was put into operation during a further blockade of the node. The commissioning of five tracks in the western part of the station took place at that time.

A total of nine full possessions were carried out for the integration of the two new lines. A total of €336 million had been invested up to May 2012 of the total estimated cost of €480 million. Several dozen companies and more than 300 people were involved in the project (as of August 2014). The station was fully blockaded from 20 to 22 November 2015 for the commissioning of additional tracks. At the end of November 2017, there was a blockade to allow the installation of a new software version of the ETCS. The next full closure was from 10 pm on 23 June 2019 to the following 12 pm (noon) to complete work on the ETCS and install new software.

The passage speed has been up to 100 km/h (62 mph) since the completion of the construction work. In a second stage of construction, the line from Eisenach is to be connected with the high-speed lines to Leipzig. Due to a lack of funds, this is only an option for which appropriate land has been reserved.

Located in the area of the station are two of the three electronic interlocking subcentres (Erfurt and Erfurt NBS), Erfurt Knoten and Erfurt Neubaustrecke, as well as two of the five ETCS Radio Block Centres of the new high-speed lines, being built under German Unity Transport Project No. 8 (Verkehrsprojekt Deutsche Einheit Nr. 8). These facilities are housed in a modular building on the north side of the freight station.

== Traffic services ==
The unique position of the station at the Willy-Brandt-Platz combines the regional and long-distance trains with perfect connections to the regional bus station, tram services, local buses, taxi cabs, long-distance buses, an underground car park and two bike stations.

=== Long-distance trains ===
The following tables show the status of 2022 timetable:

Line	Route	Frequency (min)
ICE 11	Munich – Augsburg – Ulm – Stuttgart – Mannheim – Frankfurt – Erfurt – Leipzig – Berlin – Berlin Gesundbrunnen	120
ICE 15	Saarbrücken – Kaiserslautern – Mannheim – Darmstadt – Frankfurt – Erfurt – Halle – Berlin – Eberswalde – Stralsund – Binz	120
ICE 18	Munich – Augsburg – Nuremberg – Erfurt – Halle – Berlin – Hamburg – Hamburg-Altona	120
ICE 28	Munich – Nuremberg – Erfurt – Leipzig – Wittenberg – Berlin – Berlin-Spandau – Hamburg – Hamburg-Altona	120
ICE 29	Munich – Nuremberg – Erfurt – Halle – Berlin – Berlin Gesundbrunnen (– Hamburg – Hamburg-Altona)	120 (Sprinter)
ICE 50	Dresden – Riesa – Leipzig – Erfurt – Gotha – Eisenach – Fulda – Frankfurt (Main) – Frankfurt Airport – Mainz – Wiesbaden	120 (Lufthansa Express Rail)
ICE 91	Berlin – Halle – Erfurt – Coburg – Nuremberg – Passau – Linz – St. Polten – Vienna	One train pair
IC 51	Frankfurt (Main) – Hanau – Schlüchtern – Fulda – Hünfeld – Bad Hersfeld – Eisenach – Gotha – Erfurt	One train pair
IC 51	Dusseldorf/Cologne – Dortmund – Kassel – Eisenach – Erfurt – Weimar – Jena – Gera	Two train pairs
IC 51	Kassel – Bebra – Eisenach – Erfurt – Weimar – Jena – Gera	One train pair
IC 51	Leipzig – Weimar – Erfurt – Gotha – Eisenach – Fulda – Hanau – Frankfurt (Main) – Heidelberg – Karlsruhe	Relief trains (Fri, Sun)
IC 51	Cologne/Dusseldorf – Essen – Bochum – Dortmund – Kassel – Bebra – Eisenach – Erfurt – Weimar – Leipzig	Relief trains (Fri, Sun)
FLX 10	Berlin Hbf – Berlin Südkreuz – Halle (Saale) – Erfurt – Gotha – Eisenach – Fulda – Frankfurt South – Darmstadt – Weinheim – Heidelberg – Stuttgart	2 train pairs

=== Regional trains ===
Due to the central position, Erfurt has connections to all regions inside Thuringia. Red highlighted trains have fewer stops. Blue highlighted trains are stopping services.

Line	Route	Frequency (min)	Vehicle type	Railway company
RE 1	Göttingen – Leinefelde – Gotha – Erfurt – Jena-Göschwitz – Gera – Gößnitz – Glauchau (Sachs)	120	Class 612	DB Regio Südost
RE 2	Erfurt – Bad Langensalza – Mühlhausen (Thür) – Leinefelde – Eichenberg – Kassel Wilhelmshöhe	120	Siemens Desiro Classic	DB Regio Südost
RE 3	Erfurt – Weimar – Jena-Göschwitz – Hermsdorf-Klosterlausnitz – Gera – Altenburg/Greiz – Elsterberg	120	Class 612	DB Regio Südost
RE 3	Erfurt – Weimar – Jena West – Jena-Göschwitz	120	Class 612	DB Regio Südost
RE 7	Erfurt – Arnstadt – Plaue (Thür) – Zella-Mehlis – Suhl – Grimmenthal – Schweinfurt – Würzburg	120	Class 612	DB Regio Südost
RE 10	Erfurt – Sömmerda – Artern – Sangerhausen – Hettstedt – Güsten – Staßfurt – Magdeburg	120	Siemens Desiro Classic	Abellio
RE 16	Erfurt – Weimar – Apolda – Großheringen – Bad Kösen – Naumburg (Saale)	120	Bombardier Talent 2	Abellio
RE 45	Erfurt – Neudietendorf – Arnstadt Hbf – Arnstadt Süd – Ilmenau	Four train pairs	Stadler Regio-Shuttle RS1	Süd-Thüringen-Bahn
RE 50	Erfurt – Arnstadt – Zella-Mehlis - Suhl - Meiningen	Six train pairs	Stadler Regio-Shuttle RS1	Süd-Thüringen-Bahn
RE 55	Erfurt – Straußfurt – Greußen – Sondershausen – Wolkramshausen – Nordhausen	120	Siemens Desiro Classic	DB Regio Südost
RE 56	Erfurt – Straußfurt – Greußen – Sondershausen – Wolkramshausen – Nordhausen	120	Siemens Desiro Classic	DB Regio Südost
RB 20	Eisenach – Gotha – Erfurt – Weimar – Apolda – Naumburg (Saale) – Weißenfels – Leipzig	60	Bombardier Talent 2	Abellio
RB 21	Erfurt – Weimar – Jena West – Jena-Göschwitz - Hermsdorf-Klosterlausnitz - Gera	120	Stadler Regio-Shuttle RS1	Erfurter Bahn
RB 23	Erfurt – Neudietendorf – Arnstadt – Stadtilm – Rottenbach – Saalfeld (Saale)	60	Stadler Regio-Shuttle RS1	Erfurter Bahn
RB 44	Erfurt – Neudietendorf – Arnstadt – Plaue (Thür) – Zella-Mehlis – Suhl – Grimmenthal – Meiningen	120	Stadler Regio-Shuttle RS1	Süd-Thüringen-Bahn
RB 52	Erfurt – Bad Langensalza – Mühlhausen (Thür) – Leinefelde	120	Siemens Desiro Classic	DB Regio Südost
RB 59	Erfurt – Sömmerda – Artern – Sangerhausen	120	Bombardier Talent 2	Abellio
RB 59	Erfurt – Erfurt Ost – Stotternheim – Großrudestedt – Sömmerda	120	Bombardier Talent 2	Abellio

=== City tram ===
The station is served by five of six tram lines and also by many bus lines. The central bus station is directly opposite to the entrance hall. All tram lines are operated by low floor vehicles. With the trams you can reach the university in the north of the city and also the international airport in the western district called Bindersleben.

Line	Route
1	Europaplatz - Rieth - Lutherkirche(Luther church) - Augustinerkloster(Augustinian monastery) - Anger - Hauptbahnhof - Thüringenhalle
3	Europaplatz - Universität(University) - Klinikum(Clinical centre) - Domplatz(Cathedral square) - Anger - Hauptbahnhof - Urbicher Kreuz
4	Bindersleben - Flughafen(Airport) - Bundesarbeitsgericht(Federal labour court) - Domplatz(Cathedral square) - Anger - Hauptbahnhof - Wiesenhügel
5	Zoopark(Zoo) - Grubenstraße - Lutherkirche(Luther church) - Augustinerkloster(Augustinian monastery) - Anger - Hauptbahnhof
6	Rieth - Universität(University) - Domplatz(Cathedral square) - Rathaus(City hall) - Anger - Hauptbahnhof - Steigerstraße

== Photogallery ==
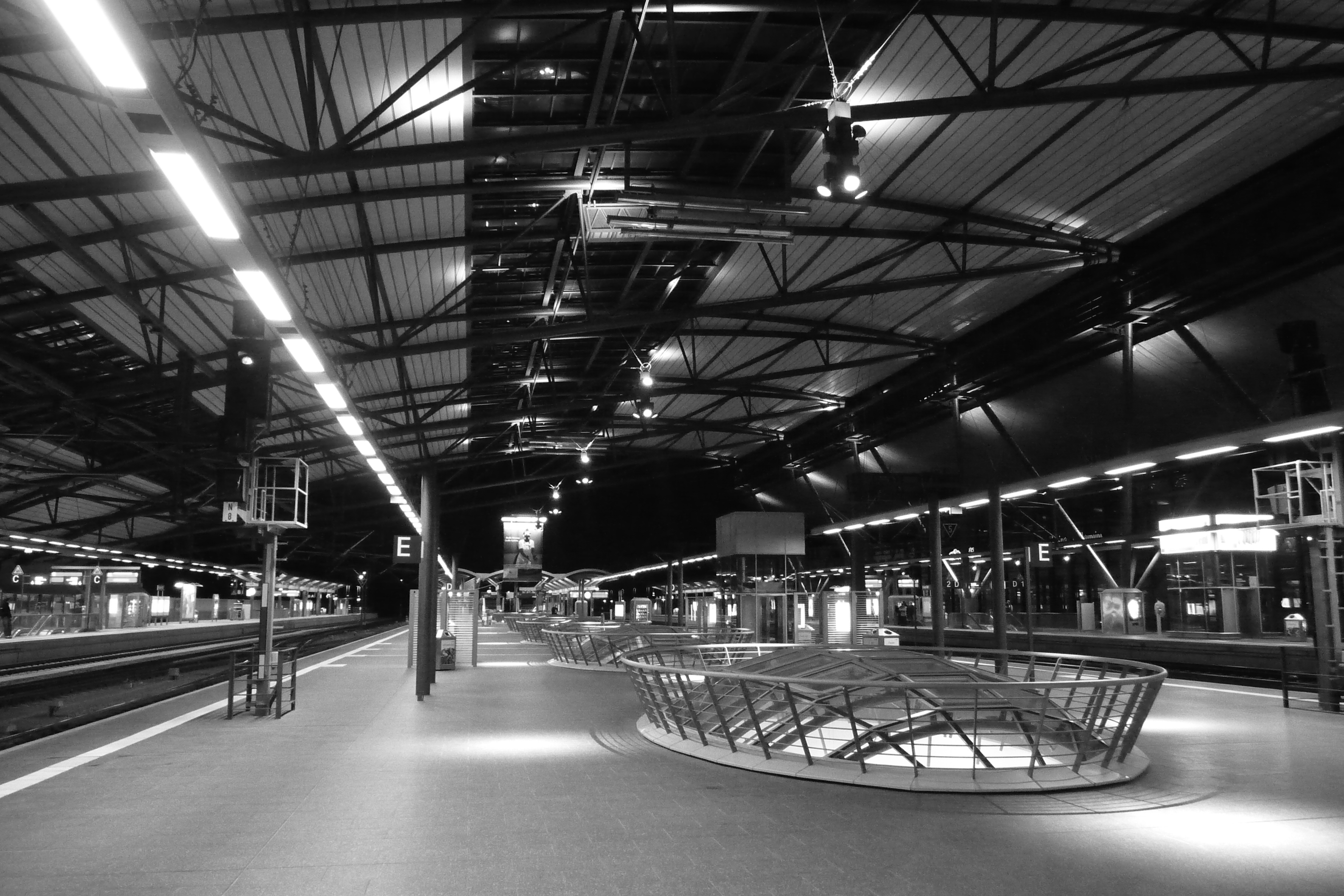
Station at night, 2009

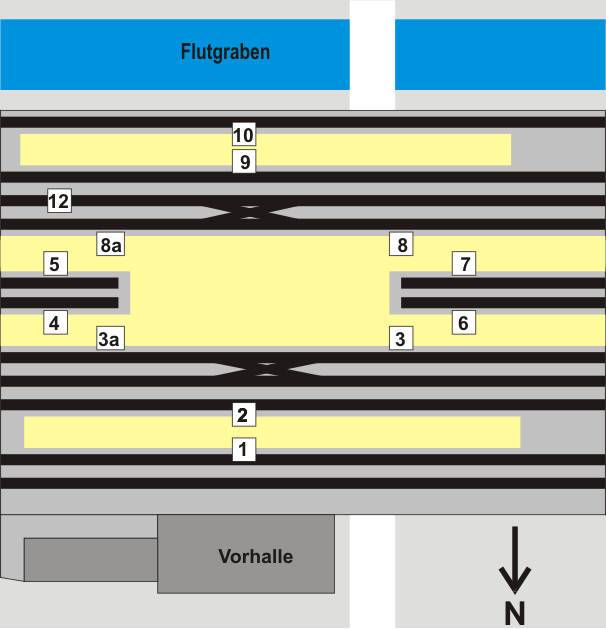
Platform layout since 2007

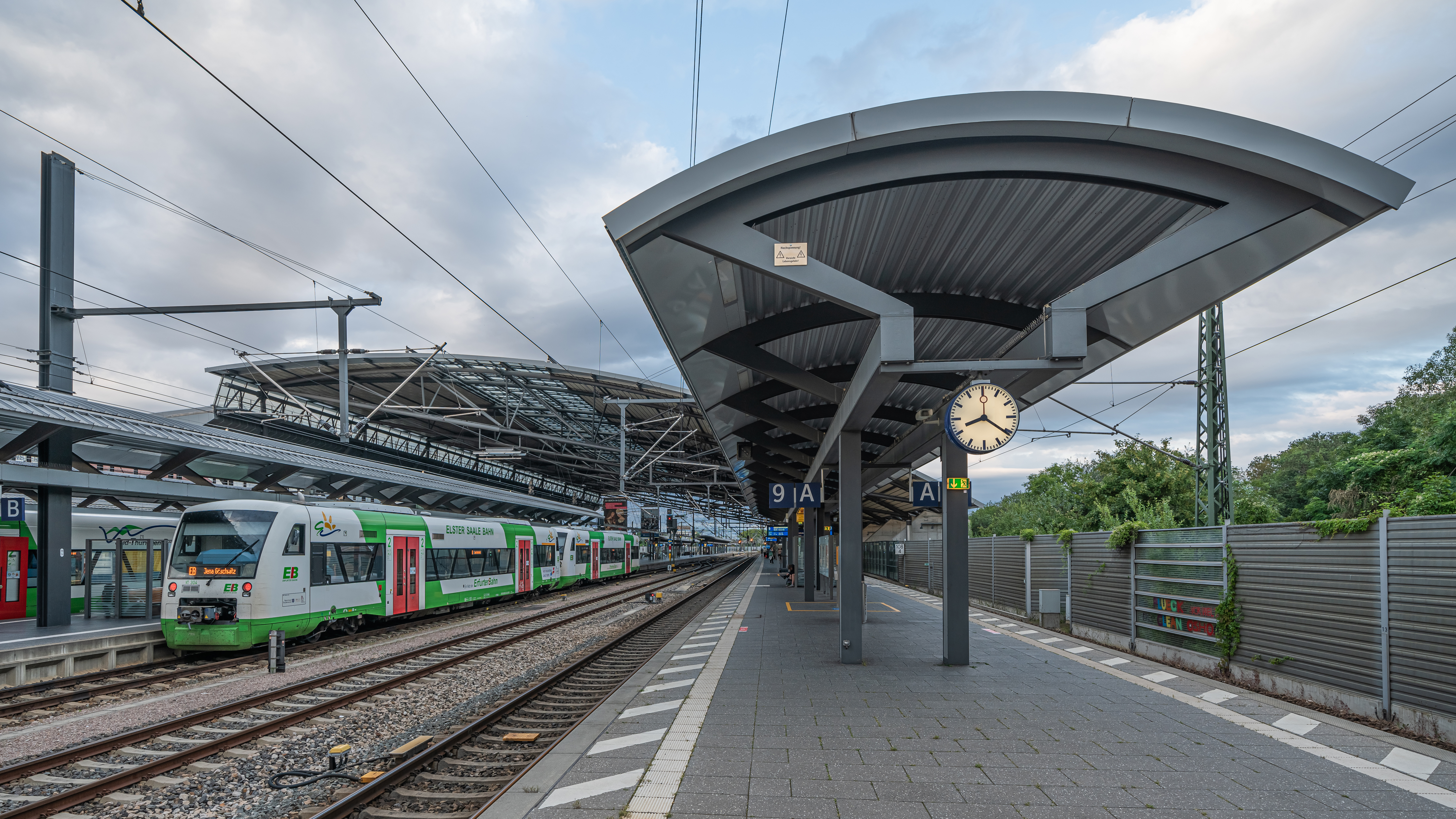
A train of Erfurter Bahn at Erfurt Hbf

== See also ==
- Rail transport in Germany
- Railway stations in Germany
