= Sömmerda station =

Railway station in Sömmerda, Germany

Sömmerda
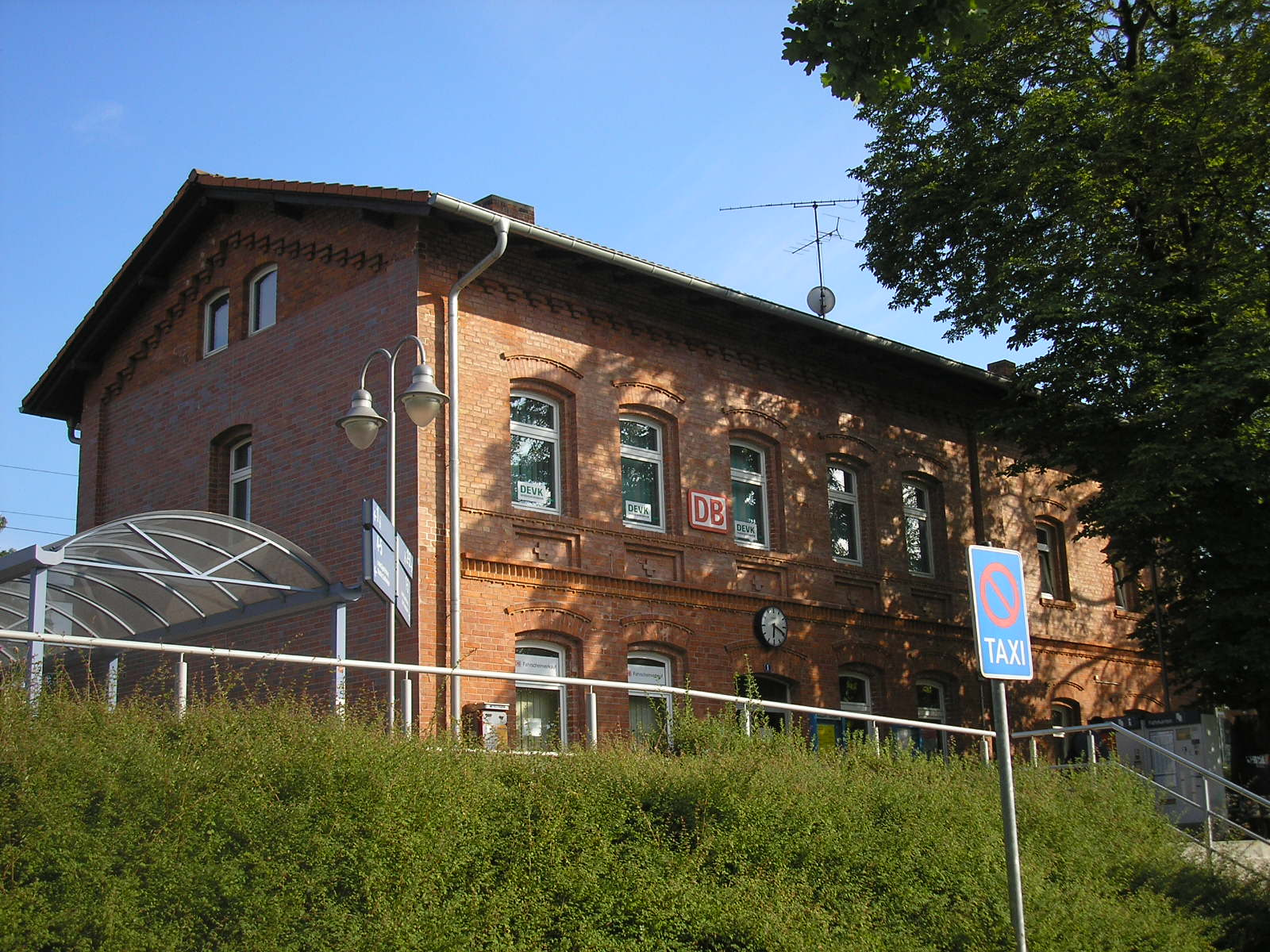
- Entrance building

General information
- Location: Am Bahnhof 1, Sömmerda, Thuringia; Germany
- Coordinates: 51°09′56″N 11°07′41″E
- Lines: Straußfurt–Großheringen (KBS 594); Sangerhausen–Erfurt (KBS 595)
- Platforms: 5

Construction
- Accessible: Yes

Other information
- Station code: 5895
- DS100 code: USD
- IBNR: 8010328
- Category: 4
- Website: www.bahnhof.de

History
- Opened: 14 August 1874

Services
Preceding station	Abellio Rail Mitteldeutschland	Following station
Großrudestedt towards Erfurt Hbf	RE 10	Leubingen towards Magdeburg Hbf
Großrudestedt towards Erfurt Hbf	RB 59	Leubingen towards Sangerhausen
Preceding station		Following station
Terminus	RB 27	Kiebitzhöhe towards Buttstädt
Location
- Location within Thuringia Location within Germany Location within Europe

Sömmerda station is the station of Sömmerda in the German state of Thuringia. It is the public transport hub of the Sömmerda district and the only Turmbahnhof ("tower station"—two-level interchange station) in Thuringia.

== History ==
The first railway reached Sömmerda on 14 August 1874. It was the Straußfurt–Großheringen railway (known as the Pfefferminzbahn—"Peppermint Railway"), which connects Straußfurt in the west via Sömmerda to Großheringen in the east. This line was built by the Nordhausen-Erfurt Railway Company (Nordhausen-Erfurter Eisenbahn-Gesellschaft) and owned by the Prussian state railways (Preußische Staatsbahn) from 1887. On 24 October 1881, the second and more important line, the Sangerhausen–Erfurt railway was opened through Sömmerda. In preparation for it, the station had to be developed into a two-level interchange station in order to link both lines. Since then, the higher Sangerhausen–Erfurt railway has run above the Peppermint Railway. This line served the traffic from Erfurt to the then capital of the Prussian Province of Saxony, Magdeburg. It was built by the Magdeburg–Halberstadt Railway Company (Magdeburg-Halberstädter Eisenbahngesellschaft) and was taken over by the Prussian government in 1886. A second track was built between Erfurt and Sömmerda. The second track was dismantled in 1946 to provide reparations, but was restored after the reunification of Germany. The line was electrified by the end of the 1990s. Passenger traffic on the Straußfurt–Sömmerda section ended on 9 December 2007 and Regionalbahn services now run on the Peppermint Railway only to Großheringen.

== Infrastructure ==
=== Platforms ===
There is barrier-free access to platform 1 via a ramp and to platform 2/3 (island platform) via a lift. Platforms 4 and 5 are accessible without barriers, although they are significantly lower than the floor height of the railcars used. Platform 5 is accessible via a walkway.

Platform	Length in m	Height in cm
1	146	55
2	146	55
3	146	55
4	194	28
5	281	26

== Regional services ==
In the 2025 timetable Sömmerda station was served by the following lines:

Line	Route	Interval (min)	Operator
RE 10	Magdeburg – Staßfurt – Hettstedt – Sangerhausen – Artern – Sömmerda – Erfurt	120	Abellio Rail Mitteldeutschland
RB 27	Sömmerda – Kölleda – Buttstädt	120; 60 (peak)	Erfurter Bahn
RB 59	Sangerhausen – Artern – Sömmerda – Erfurt	120	Abellio Rail Mitteldeutschland

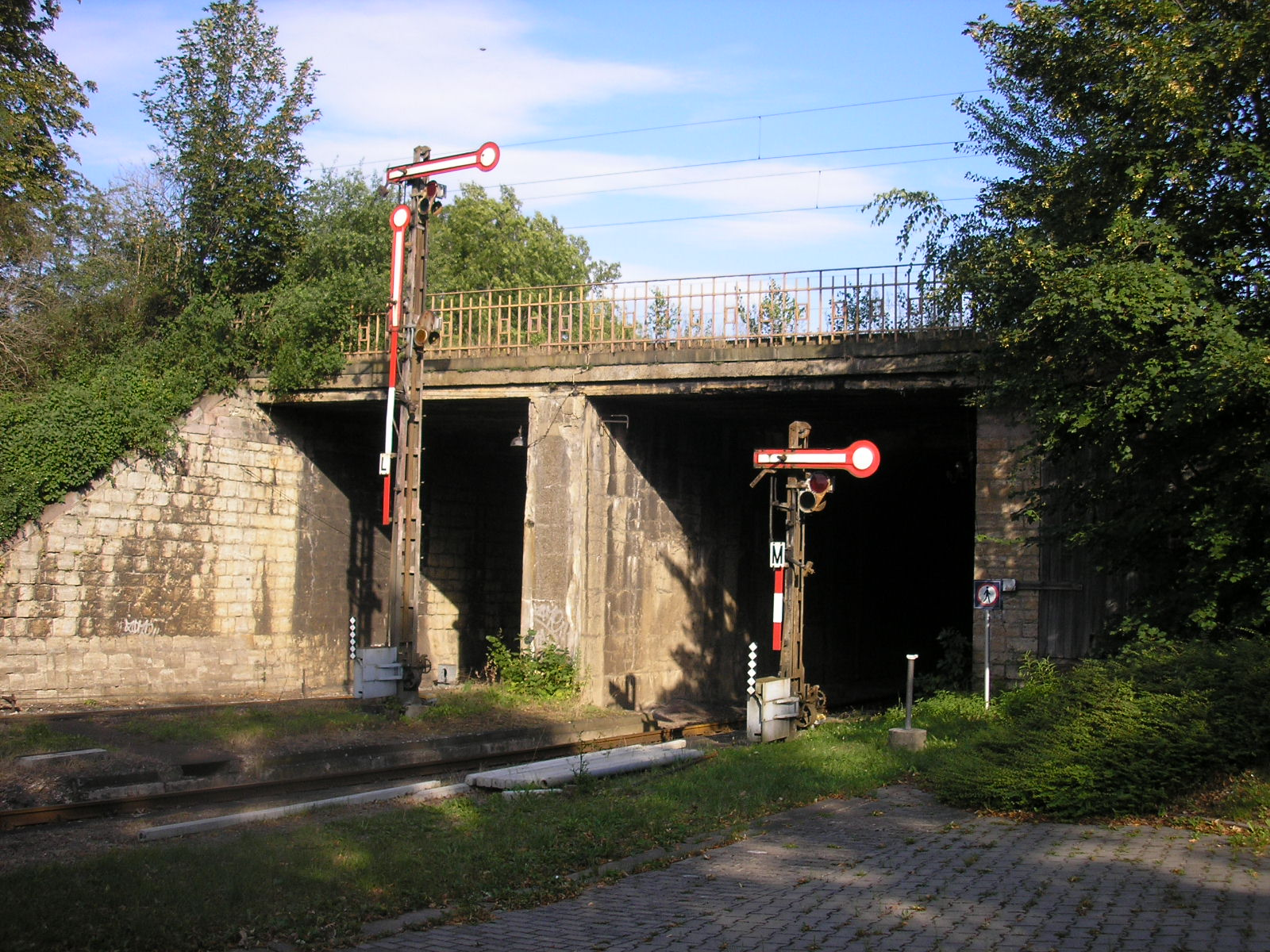
Rail crossing in the two-level station

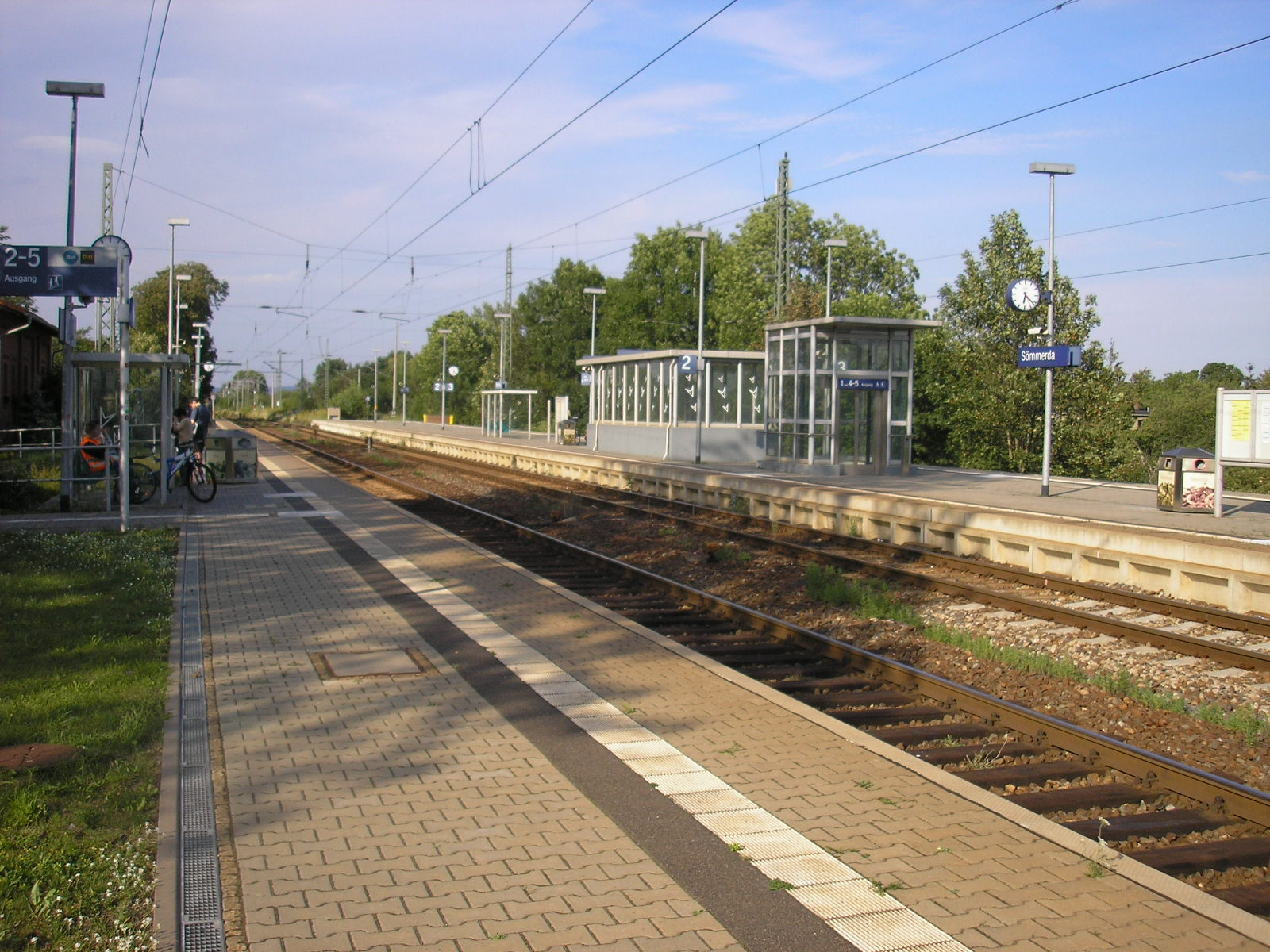
Platforms 1–3 (above)

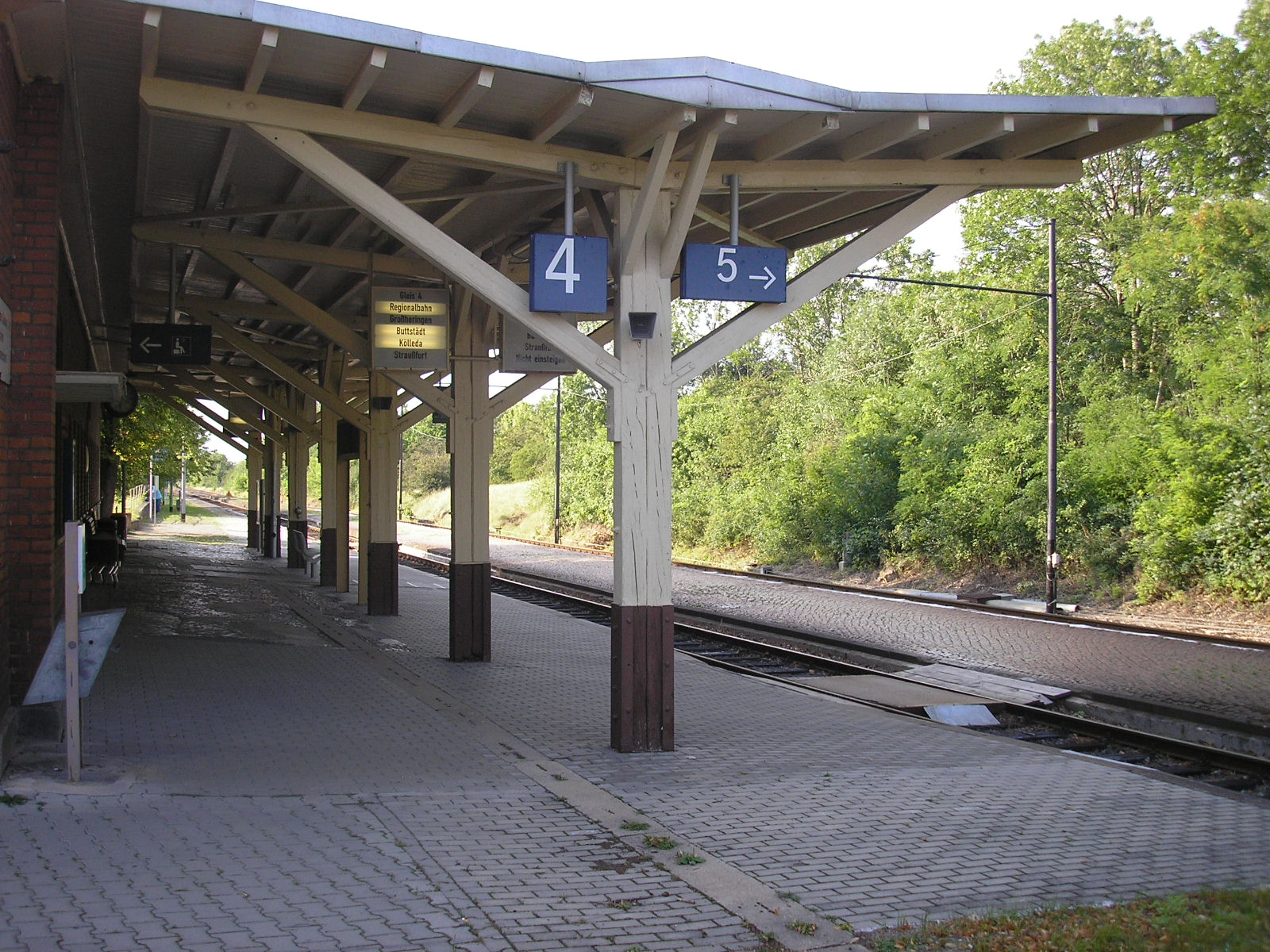
Platforms 4–5 (under)
