= Nordhausen station =

Railway station in Nordhausen, Germany

Nordhausen
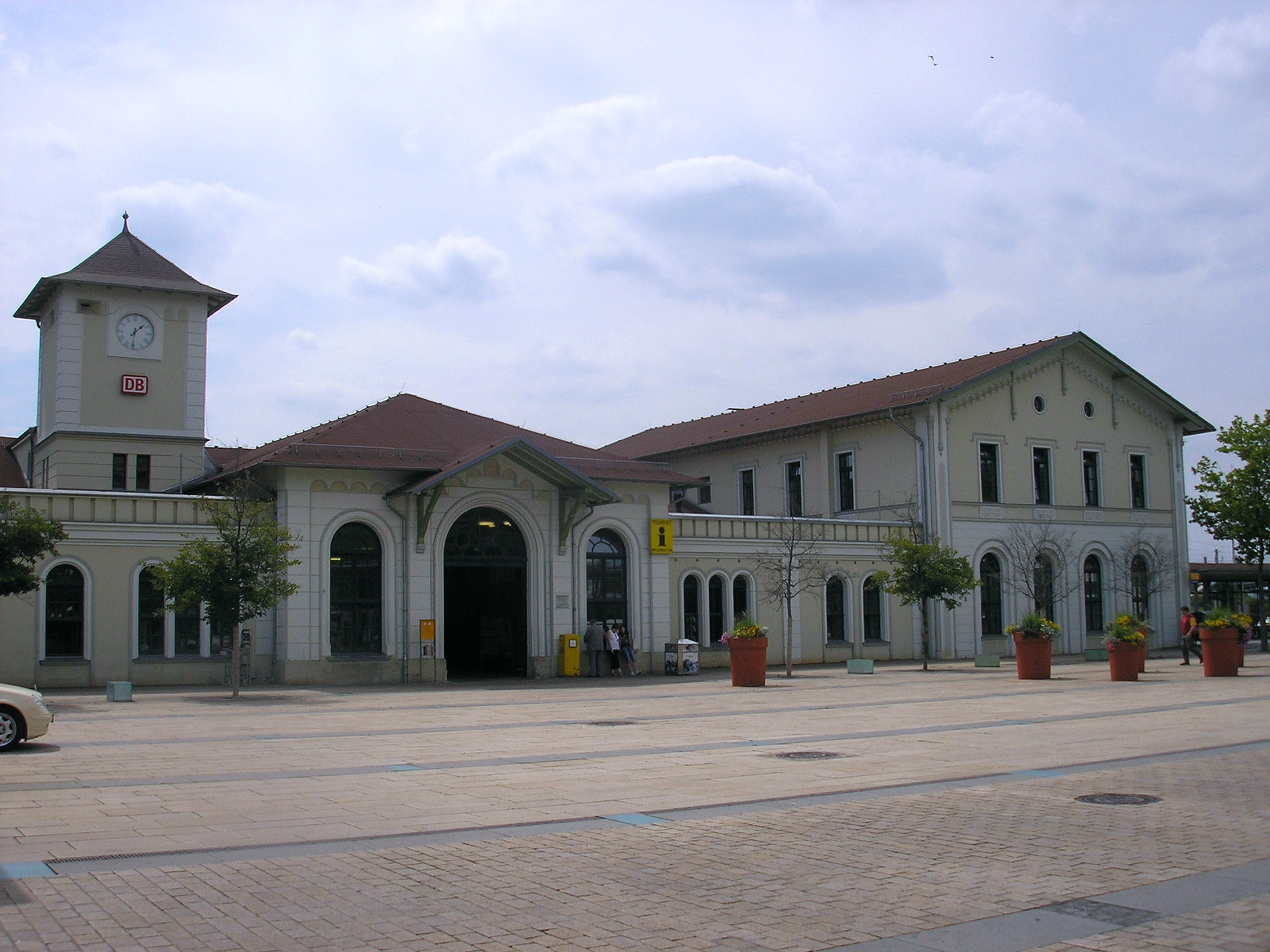

General information
- Location: Bahnhofsplatz 6, Nordhausen, Thuringia; Germany
- Coordinates: 51°29′36″N 10°47′21″E
- Owner: Deutsche Bahn
- Operator: DB Netz; DB Station&Service
- Lines: Halle–Kassel (KBS 590 / KBS 600); South Harz Railway (KBS 357); Nordhausen–Erfurt (KBS 601); Harz Railway (narrow gauge) (KBS 326); Helme Valley Railway (closed)
- Platforms: 5
- Connections: Trams: 1 10

Construction
- Accessible: Yes
- Architectural style: Historicism

Other information
- Station code: 4576
- DS100 code: UN
- IBNR: 8010256
- Category: 3
- Website: www.bahnhof.de

History
- Opened: 1866

Passengers
- 3,000

Services
Preceding station	Abellio Rail Mitteldeutschland	Following station
Wolkramshausen towards Leinefelde	RE 8	Berga-Kelbra towards Halle (Saale) Hbf
Wolkramshausen towards Kassel-Wilhelmshöhe	RE 9	Berga-Kelbra towards Halle (Saale) Hbf
Preceding station	DB Regio Südost	Following station
Wolkramshausen towards Erfurt Hbf	RE 55	Terminus
Werther towards Erfurt Hbf	RE 56	Terminus
Preceding station	DB Regio Nord	Following station
Nordhausen-Salza towards Göttingen	RB 80	Terminus
Nordhausen-Salza towards Bodenfelde	RB 81	Terminus
Preceding station	Harzer Schmalspurbahnen	Following station
Terminus	Harzquerbahn	Nordhausen Altentor towards Drei Annen Hohne
Location

Nordhausen station is a railway junction in the north of the German state of Thuringia and the main station in the city of Nordhausen. It is located just south of the city centre in the valley of the Zorge.

== History ==
The railway arrived in Nordhausen on 10 July 1866 with the opening of the line to Halle, which was extended on 9 July 1867 to the west to Eichenberg. In 1869 lines to Northeim and to Erfurt were added. In 1897, the narrow gauge Harz Railway was opened to Wernigerode, starting at the Nordhausen Nord station on the north side of the station. In the station forecourt there is a stop on the Nordhausen tramway that connects the station with most districts of the town.

In 1994 the station was electrified. The station is also important for east-west freight and a large freight yard is located east of the station.

== Rail services ==
Line	Route	Interval (mins)
RE 8	Halle – Sangerhausen – Berga-Kelbra – Nordhausen – Leinefelde	120
RE 9	Bitterfeld – Halle – Nordhausen – Leinefelde – Kassel-Wilhelmshöhe	120
RE 55	Nordhausen – Wolkramshausen – Sondershausen – Straußfurt – Erfurt	120
RE 56	Nordhausen – Wolkramshausen – Sondershausen – Straußfurt – Erfurt	120
RB 57	Heiligenstadt – Leinefelde – Bleicherode Ost – Nordhausen – Berga-Kelbra – Sangerhausen	120
RB 80	Nordhausen – Walkenried – Herzberg (Harz) – Northeim (Han) – Göttingen	120
RB 81	Nordhausen – Walkenried – Herzberg (Harz) – Northeim (Han) – Bodenfelde	120
Harzquerbahn	Nordhausen Nord – Ilfeld – Eisfelder Talmühle – Drei Annen Hohne	Some services
