= Sangerhausen station =

Railway station in Sangerhausen, Germany

Sangerhausen
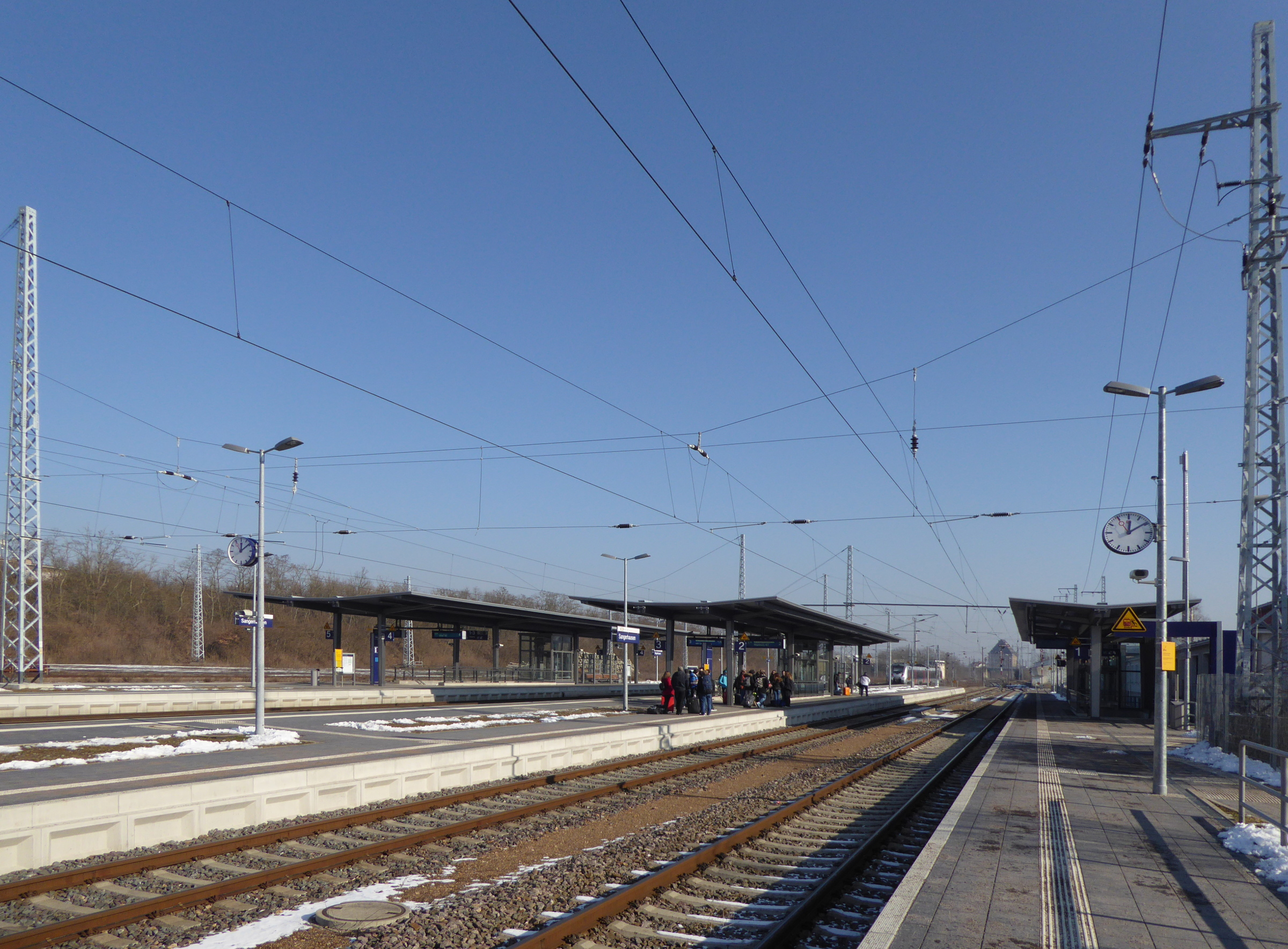
- Platforms (2017)

General information
- Location: Bahnhofstr. 33a, Sangerhausen; Saxony-Anhalt, Germany
- Coordinates: 51°28′48″N 11°17′40″E
- Owner: Deutsche Bahn
- Operator: DB Station&Service
- Lines: Halle–Hann. Münden km 59.2; Sangerhausen–Erfurt km 0.0
- Platforms: 5
- Tracks: 7
- Train operators: Abellio Rail Mitteldeutschland

Construction
- Accessible: Yes

Other information
- Station code: 5505
- DS100 code: USG
- IBNR: 8010312
- Category: 4
- Website: www.bahnhof.de

History
- Opened: 10 June 1866

Services
Preceding station	Abellio Rail Mitteldeutschland	Following station
Berga-Kelbra towards Leinefelde	RE 8	Wolferode towards Halle (Saale) Hbf
Wallhausen (Helme) towards Kassel-Wilhelmshöhe	RE 9	Blankenheim towards Halle (Saale) Hbf
Oberröblingen towards Erfurt Hbf	RE 10	Klostermansfeld towards Magdeburg Hbf
Oberröblingen towards Erfurt Hbf	RB 59	Terminus
Preceding station	Mitteldeutschland S-Bahn	Following station
Terminus	S 7	Riestedt towards Halle (Saale) Hbf
Location
- Location within Saxony-Anhalt Location within Germany Location within Europe

Sangerhausen station is a station in the town of Sangerhausen in the district of Mansfeld-Südharz in the German state of Saxony-Anhalt. It was opened for passenger operations in 1866. It became a junction station in 1881 with the opening of the Sangerhausen–Erfurt railway. A new station building was built after the Second World War, which is now heritage-listed. In the past, it was served by long-distance traffic. Extensive modernisation of the platforms and buildings have taken place since 2014.

== Location ==
The station is located in the north of the town and almost a kilometre from the town centre. It is located at line kilometre 59.2 of the Halle–Hann. Münden railway and is the starting point of the line to Erfurt. It faces Lengefelder Straße and Kaltenborner Weg. The next station towards Halle is the halt (Haltepunkt) of Riestedt, towards Hann. Münden, it is Wallhausen station and on the line towards Erfurt, the first stop is at Oberröblingen station about five kilometres away.

== History ==
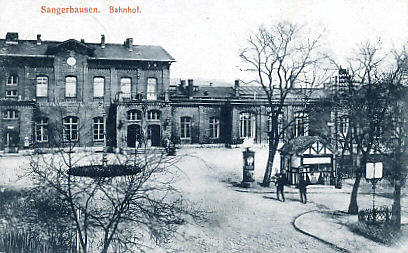
Old entrance building (1910)

Construction of the station in Sangerhausen began in 1865. The railway between Halle and Hann. Münden was opened for passenger operations on 10 July 1866. The first entrance building was built in the same year. Sangerhausen became a junction station in 1881 when the line to Erfurt was added. An ammunition train exploded in the station in 1944 and it was destroyed. Today's entrance building was built in 1963.

== Infrastructure ==
=== Platforms and tracks ===
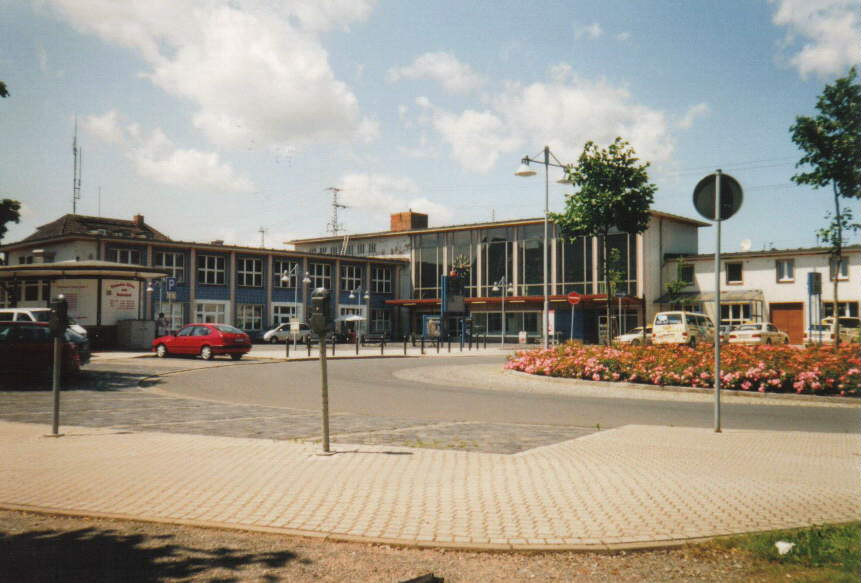
Entrance building (2014)

In 1979, there were three platforms in Sangerhäusen station. A total of 17 tracks were available. Their structural length was between 50 and 855 metres. In addition, five connecting tracks ran from the station to local factories. The shortest was 190 metres long and the longest was 149 metres.

Extensive modernisation work was started in September 2014. The platform, the passenger subway and the platform were renewed by 2016 for €5.5 million and, in addition, lifts were installed.

=== Entrance building ===
The present entrance building, which is located south of the railway tracks, was built in 1963. It was the first station to be built in the GDR and is protected as a monument. The painter and graphic designer, Wilhelm Schmied created a particularly striking wall mosaic in the station's entrance hall. It shows the Mansfeld Land with its agriculture and mining. The round kiosk on the forecourt was built in 1957.

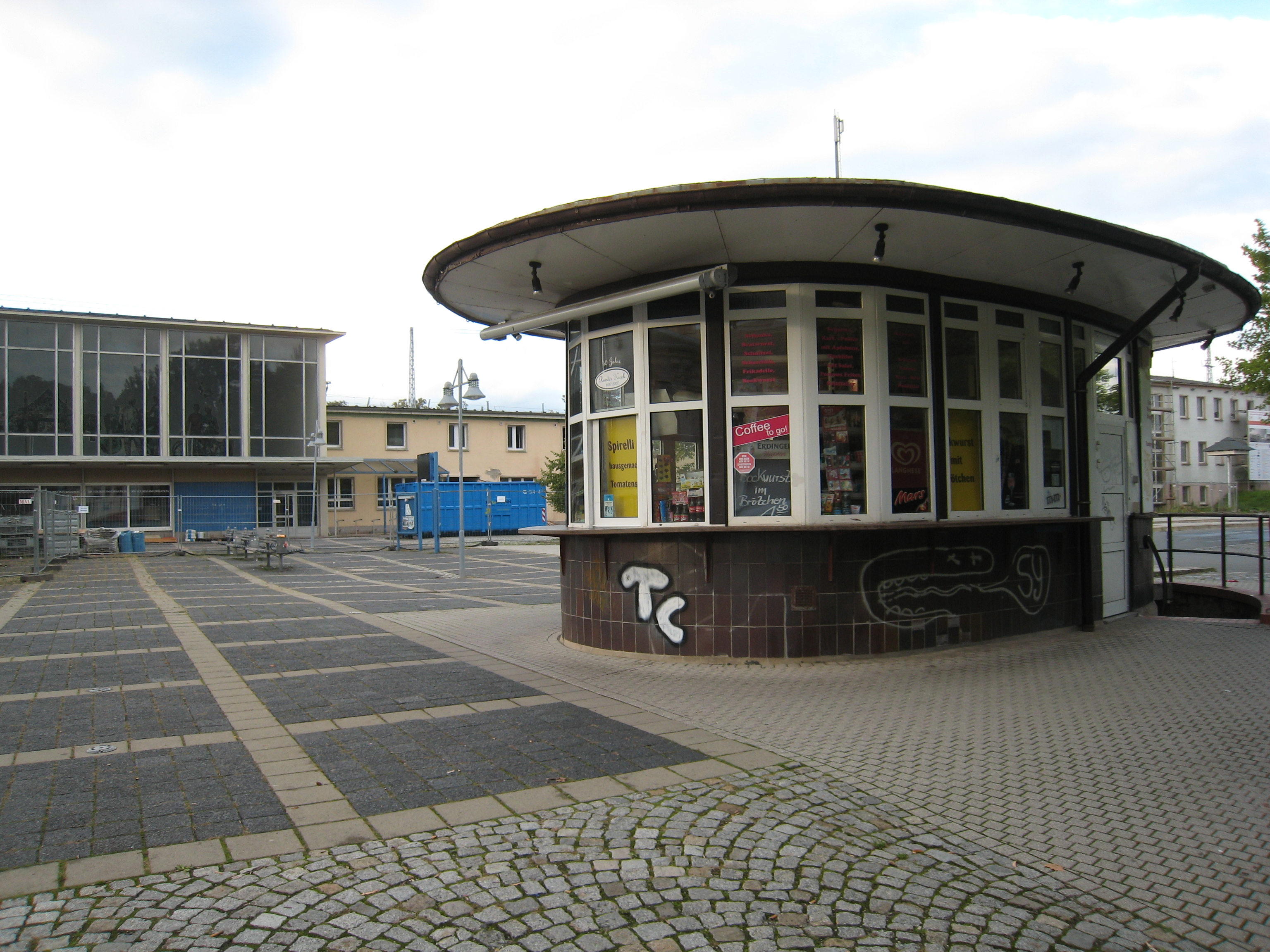
Round kiosk built in 1957 (2015)

In 2009, the town of Sangerhausen acquired the station for €405,000 from Deutsche Bahn.

The refurbished entrance building is scheduled to open in October 2016. €6 million has been earmarked for this. Subsequently, it will contain a service point, tourist information, WCs and the municipal library.

=== Other facilities ===
Two loading roads led to the tracks. In addition, there was a freight-handling facility with six parallel tracks, as well as a head and a side ramp each of which had a carrying capacity of 60 tonnes. There were eleven water cranes available for steam locomotives that could pump two cubic metres of water per minute.

=== Repair shop and washing facility ===
The groundbreaking ceremony was held on 2 June 2014 for the construction of a repair shop and a washing facility for the Abellio trains. It was built on the site of the former freight yard south of the railway tracks in the eastern part of the station. On 5 June 2015, its overhead wires were energised. Abellio took over the operation on the line to Erfurt in December 2015. Sangerhausen was chosen for its good location in the Saale-Thuringia-South Harz network.

== Locomotive depot ==
The former locomotive depot (Bahnbetriebswerk) of Sangerhausen was located northwest of the station. There were two locomotive sheds with turntables. Locomotive shed 1 was built in 1899 with a turntable with a diameter of 20 metres. It was built out of yellow bricks. Locomotive shed 2 was built in 1923 with a diameter of 23 metres.

Until 1945, the depot was supervised by the Reichsbahn railway division (Reichsbahndirektion) of Kassel. From 3 January 1947 to 15 January 1947, it was supervised by the railway division of Halle. After that it belonged to the railway division of Erfurt.

In the 1990s, the Sangershausen Locomotive depot was closed. The rolling stock maintenance was reorganised and merged into fewer locations. The maintenance of trains is now carried out for the most part in Magdeburg and Halle.

The building is now unused. Its sale was considered in 2011/12.

== Connections ==
=== Long distance ===
Durchgangszug (express trains) stopped in Sangerhausen until 1992.

In 1993/94, the station was served by InterRegio trains. These ran between Frankfurt (Main) and Halle as well as between Konstanz and Dessau.

From 2010 onwards, a pair of IC trains ran between Leipzig and Frankfurt (Main) on Sundays. This was part of line 50 and was run as a relief train. This train was removed from the timetable in December 2014. Thus Sangerhausen lost its long-distance traffic.

=== Regional services ===
Currently (2025) Sangerhausen station is served by the following regional services:

Line	Route	Interval (min)	Operator
RE 8	(Dessau –) Bitterfeld – Halle (Saale) – Lutherstadt Eisleben – Sangerhausen – Nordhausen – Leinefelde	120	Abellio Rail Mitteldeutschland
RE 9	Bitterfeld – Halle (Saale) – Lutherstadt Eisleben – Sangerhausen – Nordhausen – Eichenberg – Kassel-Wilhelmshöhe	120	Abellio Rail Mitteldeutschland
RE 10	Magdeburg – Staßfurt – Hettstedt – Sangerhausen – Artern – Sömmerda – Erfurt	120	Abellio Rail Mitteldeutschland
RB 59	Sangerhausen – Artern – Sömmerda – Erfurt	120	Abellio Rail Mitteldeutschland
S 7	Halle (Saale) – Lutherstadt Eisleben – Sangerhausen	Some services	Abellio Rail Mitteldeutschland

In the two-hour cycle the state bus route 460 operated by Verkehrsgesellschaft Südharz runs from the bus station to Hettstedt via Wippra. The line was established after the restructuring of the Wipperliese service on the Klostermansfeld–Wippra railway. Also some services of state bus route 460 run to Stolberg (Harz) via Berga and Rottleberode.
