= Wolkramshausen–Erfurt railway =

Main line railway in the German state of Thuringia

Overview
- Line number: 6302
- Locale: Thuringia, Germany

Service
- Route number: 601

Technical
- Line length: 71.0 km (44.1 mi)
- Track gauge: 1,435 mm (4 ft 8 1/2 in) standard gauge
Route map
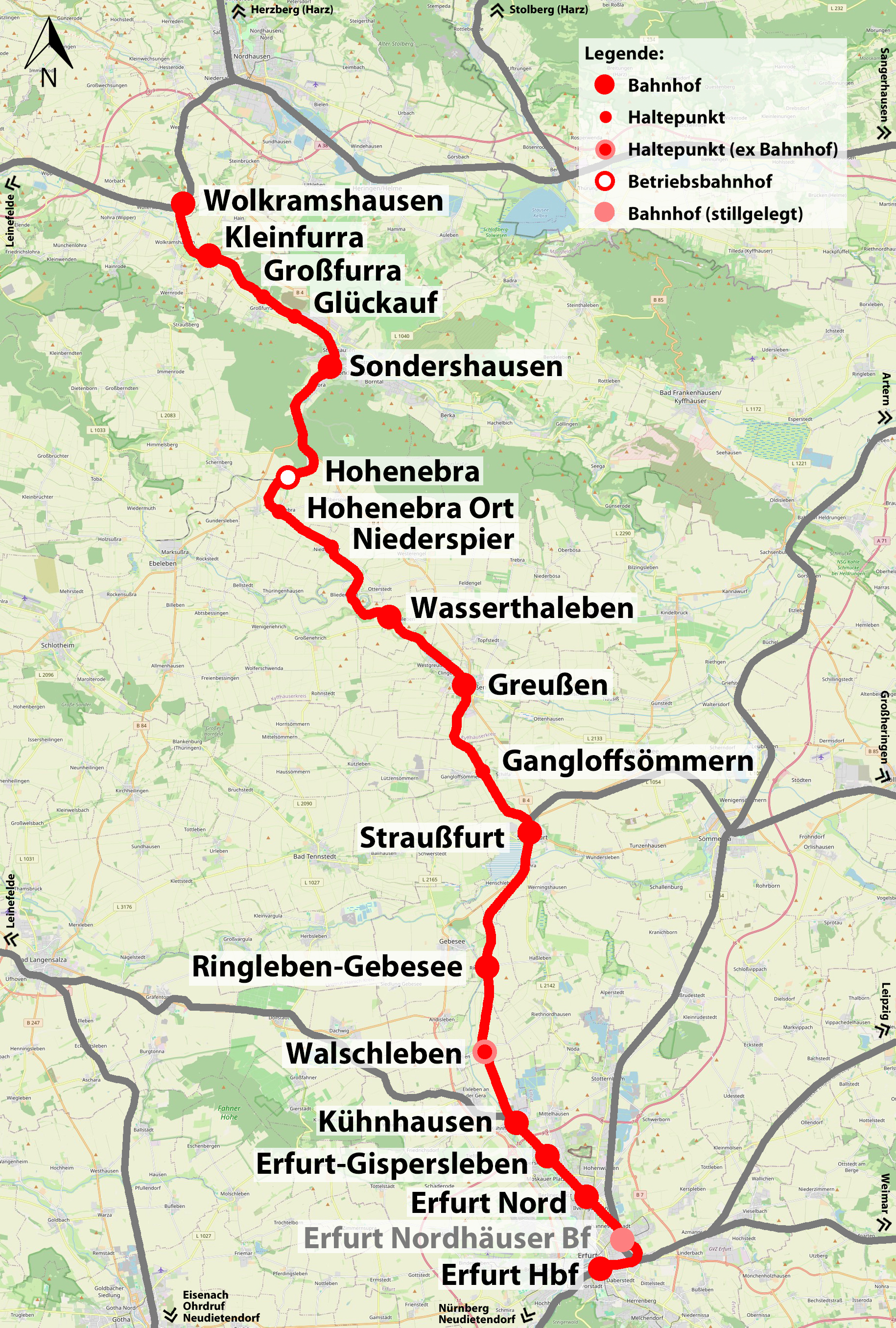
- Source: German railway atlas

The Wolkramshausen–Erfurt railway is a 71 kilometre-long single-track main line railway in the German state of Thuringia, which is served only by regional services.

== History ==
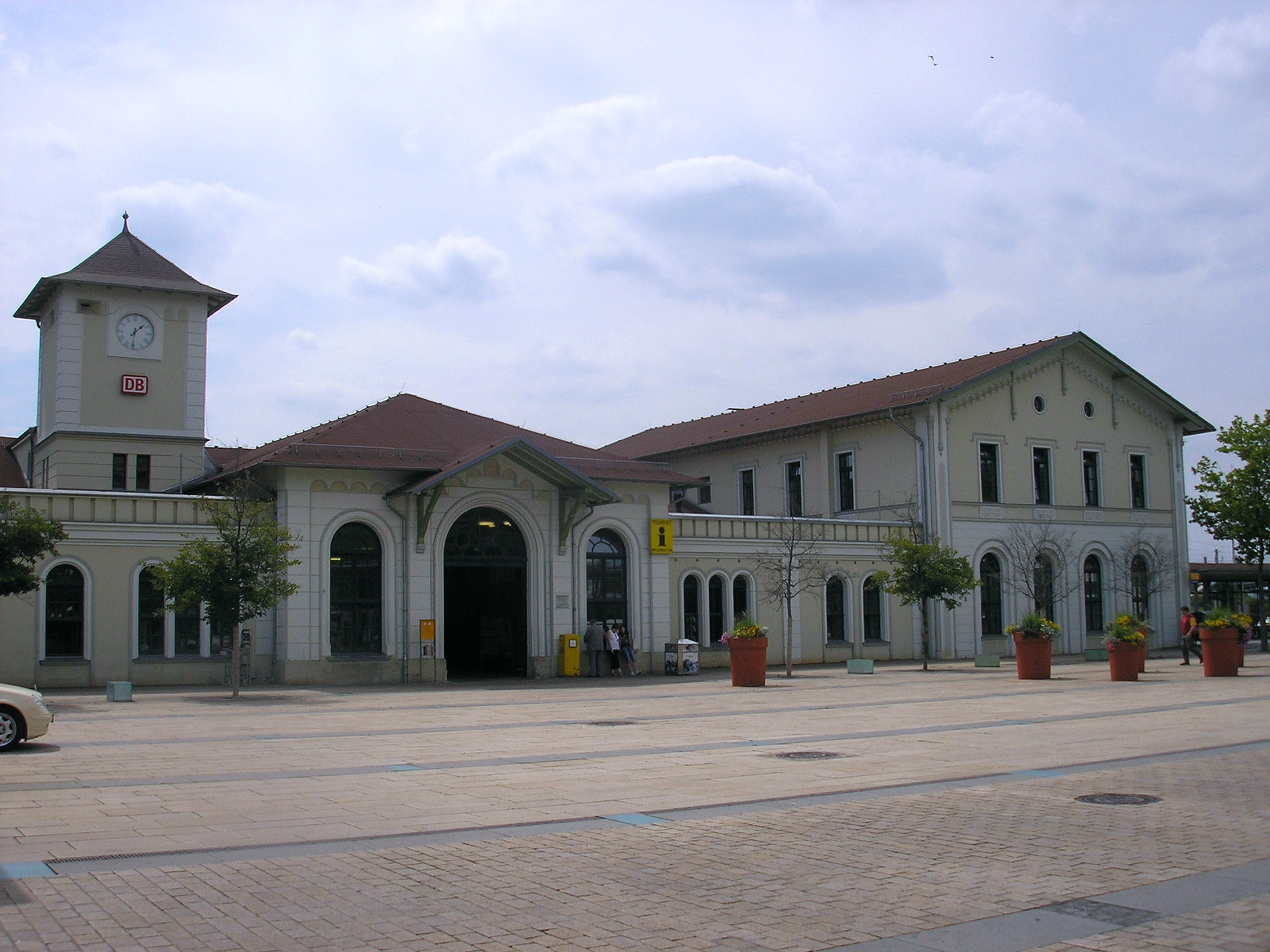
Nordhausen station

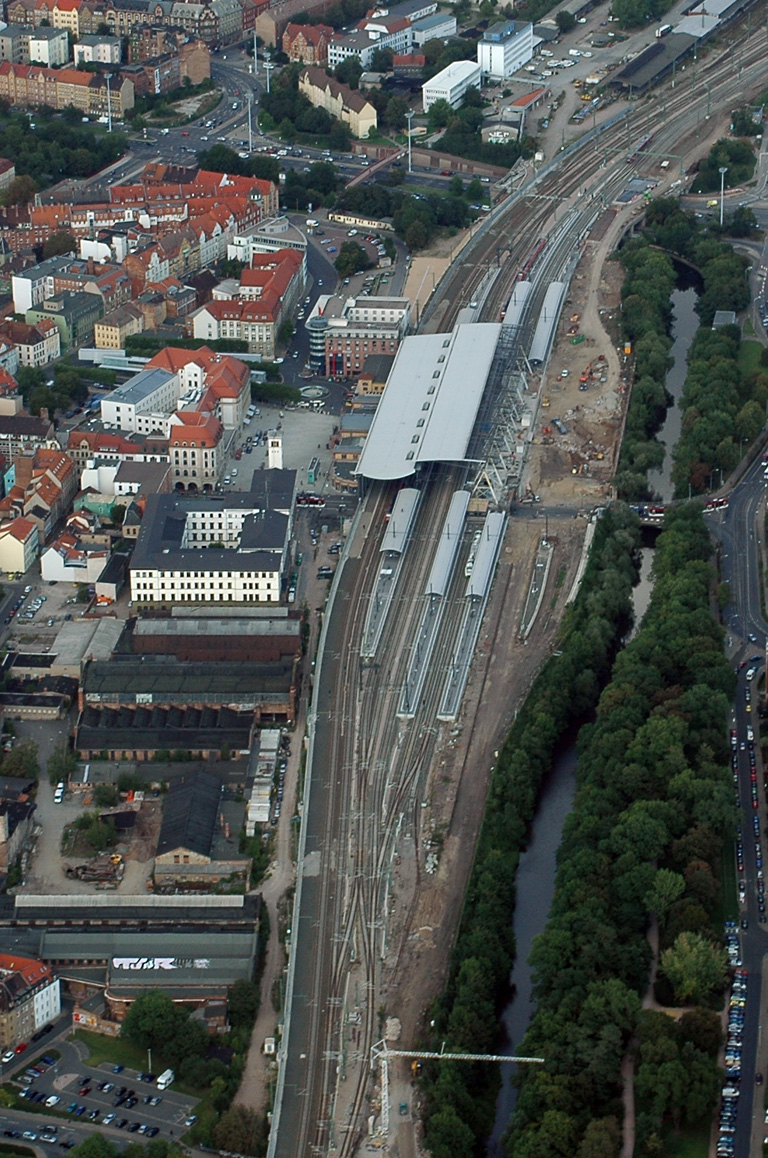
Erfurt Central Station under reconstruction (2007)

The construction of the Erfurt-Nordhausen railway was constructed in accordance with a treaty between Prussia and the Principality of Schwarzburg-Sondershausen signed on 21 December 1866. Agreements were reached for the provision of government investment and guarantees from Schwarzburg-Sondershausen and the adjacent districts and cities of Prussia so that the Nordhausen-Erfurter Eisenbahn (Nordhausen-Erfurt Railway, NEE) company could be founded on 24 April 1867 and it received a licence for the project from Schwarzburg-Sondershausen on 17 June 1867. The aim of the railway construction was to connect the cities of Nordhausen and Erfurt (both in the Prussian Province of Saxony at that time), and at the same time establish the first rail connection to part of the Schwarzburg-Sondershäuser Unterherrschaft (under dominion), which was the northern part of the principality of Schwarzburg-Sondershausen.

The line was built by a consortium of the companies of Plessner, Schultze and Steinfeld of Berlin and was opened on 17 August 1869. It ran for its first eight kilometres from Nordhausen to Wolkramshausen along the Halle–Kassel railway towards Eichenberg and Kassel, though on a second track built for the line, reached the Residenzstadt (royal capital) of Sondershausen and further south crossed the Hainleite ridge and ran by Greußen and Straußfurt to the state capital of Erfurt, where it ended at the station of the Thuringian Railway. Later several branches and connecting lines branched off the line. The Kyffhäuser Railway branched off from Sondershausen to Bad Frankenhausen from 1898. The Hohenebra-Ebeleben railway was opened from Hohenebra in 1883 and the Greußen-Ebeleben-Keula railway was opened from Greußen in 1901, connecting to Ebeleben and Keula. The Ballstädt–Straußfurt railway (opened from 1889 to 1906) and the Straußfurt–Großheringen railway (opened in 1874) branched off from Straußfurt and the Erfurt–Bad Langensalza railway (opened in 1897) branched off from Kühnhausen.

Following the nationalisation of private railways in Prussia and because the line's profits were below expectations as a result of growing competition from other railways, the company agreed to be bought by the Prussian State, which took control on 1 January 1887. The company was dissolved and its assets were placed under the railway division (Eisenbahndirektion) of Frankfurt, but was soon transferred to the railway division of Erfurt.

== Planning ==
It is planned to upgrade the line from Nordhausen and Erfurt to allow a line speed of 120 km/h. It is envisaged that travel time will be reduced to less than an hour and services will connect to the Intercity-Express line to the south. In Kühnhausen provision will be made for the coupling of railcars from Bad Langensalza. The first section between Wolkramshausen and Sondershausen was scheduled to be completed by the end of 2013 but was delayed until 2014.

== Passenger services ==
- 1880: three pairs of trains per day, running time: 2:18.
- 1913: six pairs of trains per day, including 2 pairs of express trains, running time: 1:27.
- 1936: 9 pairs of trains per day, including 2 pairs of express trains, running time: 1:40.
- 2006: KBS 601, hourly services, every second services was a Regional-Express (RE), running time: 1:19.
- 2009: up to 17 pairs of services daily with additional services between Nordhausen and Sondershausen during peak hours, hourly services, every second service is an RE, running time: 1:15.
