= North–South railway =

Railway line in Germany

North-South line

Flieden–Frankfurt branch

The North–South railway (German: Nord-Süd-Strecke) is an amalgamation of several railway lines in Germany that came to significant importance in West Germany and are therefore commonly regarded as a single entity. During the division of Germany, it was the most important and the most densely used long-distance line of the Deutsche Bundesbahn. Since 1991, after the opening of the Hanover–Würzburg high-speed railway, the line mainly sees local passenger trains, freight trains and night services, as the long-distance services almost exclusively use the new line.

== History ==
The single lines on the route were quite notable, however the long-distance traffic Hanover–Fulda–Frankfurt/Würzburg was negligible. Most trains between Hanover and Frankfurt were routed via Kassel Central Station and the Main-Weser Railway, and many trains to Bavaria ran via Leipzig/Halle and the Saal Railway line.

=== Post-1945 ===
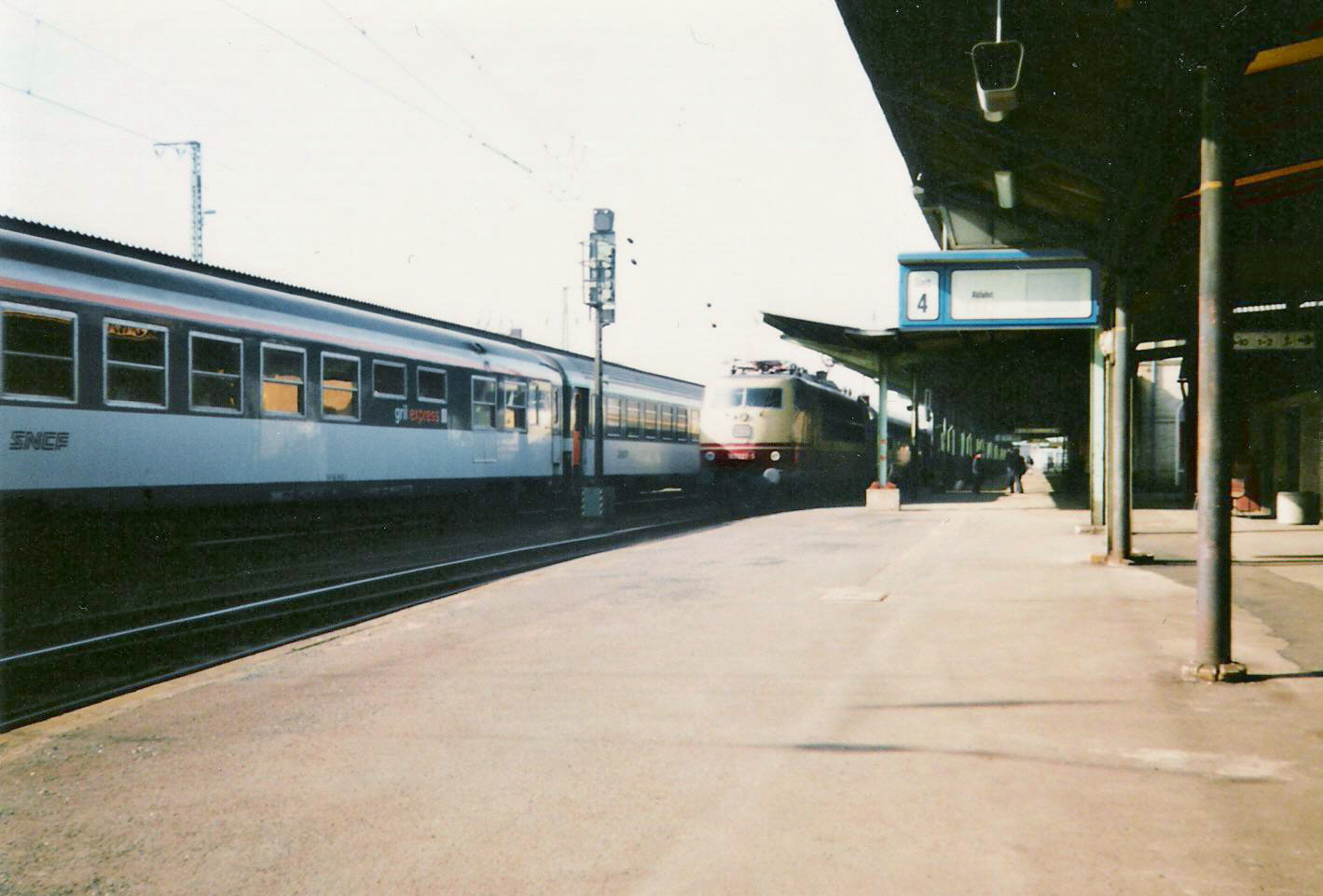
Long distance trains in Bebra

The situation changed drastically after World War II – Germany was divided in half, and, owing to the Wanfried Agreement, all of the lines forming the North-South line were situated inside West Germany. As the connection via Leipzig and Halle was no longer available, the lines had to carry most of the traffic, which had shifted from Germany's previous East-West orientation. Providing a convenient bypass around the GDR, the lines also took international trains like the Copenhagen to Vienna expresses. The Deutsche Bundesbahn favoured the faster connection via Hanover, Fulda and Würzburg over the Main-Weser Railway which had the disadvantage of the terminal station in Kassel, among others. With the Main-Weser Railway taking most of the freight traffic, the passenger traffic on the North–South railway increased steadily in the 1950s and 1960s.

The line saw massive investments, among them the 1963 electrification. The maximum speed was increased wherever possible, with several stretches of line permitting speeds of 160 km/h and 200 km/h on some short stretches between Gelnhausen and Hanau. However, other places like Eichenberg or Bebra became severe bottlenecks, only permitting speeds of 100 km/h or even lower.

It was foreseeable since the 1960s that the existing railway line would be too overloaded and too slow for the traffic demand expected in West Germany. The situation worsened when the InterCity service was introduced in 1972 and 1979, and the old line was amended by the Hanover-Würzburg high-speed rail line, whose Fulda-Würzburg part opened in 1988, the Hanover-Fulda part following in 1991.

=== Since 1991 ===
The ICE trains from and to Hanover use the high-speed line north of Fulda. Trains going to Frankfurt use the Frankfurt branch of the old line. The section Bebra-Fulda sees ICE services from Dresden to Frankfurt.

Between Göttingen and Hanover, the former InterRegio services now run as InterCity trains, calling at Alfeld, Kreiensen and Northeim.

Other than that, the Nord-Süd-Strecke sees almost exclusively RegionalExpress and RegionalBahn trains as well as a high number of freight trains. Some night trains operated by DB NachtZug use the line at night to prolong travel times to prevent a too early arrival at their destination.

== Route ==
The North–South Line is made up of several historically developed railway lines:

=== Hannover–Göttingen–Friedland ===
The section from Göttingen is part of the Hanoverian Southern Railway that was opened in 1854 (Hanover–Kassel–Marburg–Frankfurt am Main). Important stations are Alfeld (Leine) and Northeim. In 1867, a branch line via Friedland was built to Arenshausen to connect the Halle-Kassel Railway with Göttingen and the Southern Railway (Südbahn). This part of the line mostly runs in the Leine river valley.

=== Friedland–Bebra ===
In 1876, after Prussia had annexed the Kingdom of Hanover and Kurhessen, the Prussian railways built a connection between the Hanoverian Southern Railway and the Frankfurt–Bebra railway via Bad Sooden-Allendorf and Eschwege. Near Eichenberg and Cornberg, four tunnels had to be built.

=== Bebra–Fulda–Frankfurt am Main ===
The line was opened in 1868 as the Frankfurt–Bebra railway. Between Bad Hersfeld and Fulda, it leaves the valley of the Fulda. Originally, the line connected Flieden to Elm using a zig zag, then went down again to Schlüchtern. This section has been cut off since 1914 by the Distelrasen Tunnel. From Schlüchtern, the line follows the Kinzig river, ultimately leading to Frankfurt via Gelnhausen and Hanau. Between Hanau and Frankfurt there are two lines, the north bank line and the south bank line.

=== Flieden–Gemünden ===
The Flieden–Gemünden railway, built in 1872, is a very curvy line that is rich in tunnels. It leads through the valleys of the rivers Fliede, Kinzig and Sinn, following the Sinn until it meets the Main near Gemünden.

=== Gemünden–Würzburg ===
Traffic on the North–South Line uses the Würzburg–Aschaffenburg railway, which mostly runs in the valley of the river Main between Gemünden and Würzburg.
