= Flieden =

- Municipality
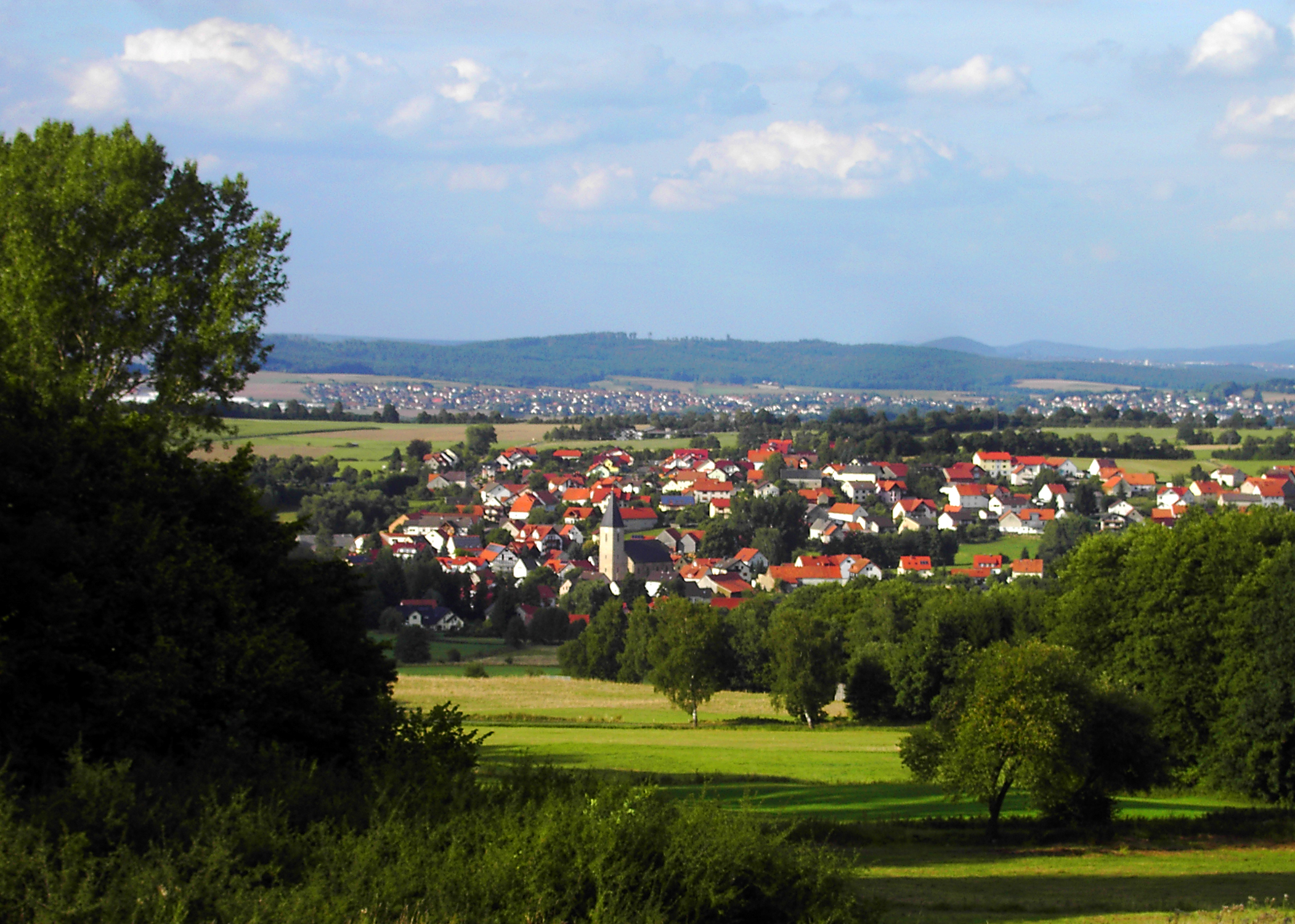
- Village of Rückers, part of Flieden

- Coat of arms

- Location of Flieden within Fulda district
- Interactive map of Flieden
- Location within Germany Location within Hesse
- Coordinates: 50°25′N 09°34′E
- Country: Germany
- State: Hesse
- Admin. region: Kassel
- District: Fulda
- Founded: before 806
- Subdivisions: 9 districts

Government
  - Mayor (2018–24): Christian Henkel (CDU)

Area
  - Total: 49.65 km^{2} (19.17 sq mi)
- Elevation: 280–508 m (919–1,667 ft)

Population (2025-12-31)
  - Total: 8,624
  - Density: 173.7/km^{2} (449.9/sq mi)
- Time zone: UTC+01:00 (CET)
  - Summer (DST): UTC+02:00 (CEST)
- Postal codes: 36103
- Dialling codes: 0 66 55
- Vehicle registration: FD
- Website: www.flieden.de

Flieden is a municipality in the district of Fulda, in Hesse, Germany. Traditionally called a “Königreich” (Kingdom), it may show a crown in its coat of arms.

== Geography ==
Flieden is located in a valley north west of the Landrücken between the Vogelsberg and the Rhön. It is an area of low hills with the highest elevations being Knöschen near Buchenrod (509 m) and the Storker Küppel near Oberstork (470 m). At the very center of Flieden the creeks Magdloser Wasser und Kautzer Wasser merge into the river Fliede which later flows into the Fulda.

In the north Flieden borders Neuhof and in the east Kalbach both in the district of Fulda. In the south and west Flieden borders Schlüchtern and Steinau an der Straße (Main-Kinzig-Kreis).

Besides the main locality, Flieden consists of the districts Berishof, Buchenrod, Döngesmühle, Federwisch, Fuldaische Höfe, Höf und Haid, Katzenberg, Kautz, Kellerei, Keutzelbuch, Langenau, Laugendorf, Leimenhof, Magdlos, Rückers, Schweben, Stork (Ober- and Unterstork), Storker Hof, Struth and Weinberg.

== History ==
In 806 Flieden was first mentioned as “Mark Flieden” in a deed of donation to the monastery of Fulda.

In the Middle Ages Flieden was located at the Via Regia from Frankfurt am Main to Leipzig which was a very important country and military road in the Holy Roman Empire.

In 1868, Flieden station was opened with the Kinzig Valley Railway. The mountains between Flieden and Schlüchtern initially led to the decision to build a zig zag line in order to avoid building an almost 4 km long tunnel. This required all through trains to reverse at Elm, which led to increasing congestion as traffic increased with the connection of the Flieden–Gemünden railway to the line at Elm in 1873. Tunnel-building technology had improved significantly by the beginning of the 20th century, notably with the increased availability of dynamite. Thus in 1909 construction of the Schlüchtern tunnel began under Distelrasen; it was completed on 14 February 1914 and put into operation on 1 May. In 2009 a second tube was opened and the old tunnel is now being rebuilt as a single-track tunnel.

At the end of World War II about 1000 displaced persons from the former eastern territories of Germany settled in Flieden.

=== Statistics ===
Year	People	Notes
1000		14 Liden and 23 Dreitagsfröner
1512		3 settlers
1516		93 neighbours
1708	596	
1791	2943	approx. later large-scale community
1983	7846	from now on a large-scale community
2004	8811	
2005	8840	
2006	8755	
2007	8717	
2008	8814	
2009	8644	
