= Ulfe =

Ulfe may refer to the following rivers in Hesse, Germany:

- Ulfe (Fulda), tributary of the Fulda
- Ulfe (Sontra), tributary of the Sontra

== See also ==
- Uelfe, alternative spelling Ülfe, a river of North Rhine-Westphalia, Germany, tributary of the Wupper
