= Frankfurt–Göttingen railway =

Railway line in Germany

Frankfurt–Göttingen
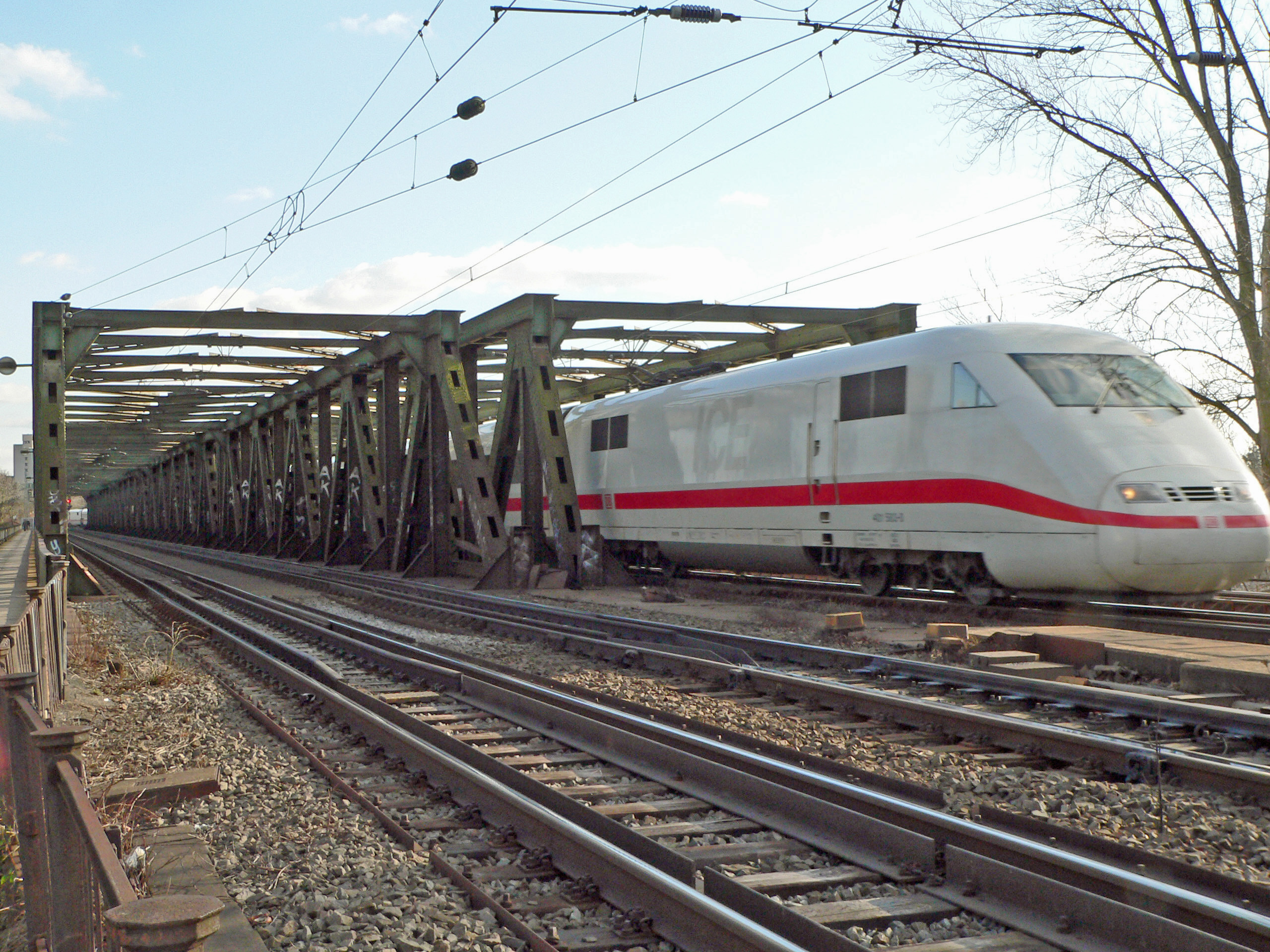
- Intercity-Express running over the Main-Neckar Bridge

Overview
- Line number: 3600; 3680 (Frankfurt-Schlachthof–Hanau); 3677 (third track: Wolfgang–Hailer-Meerholz); 3826 (Schlüchtern Ziegenberg–Elm); 3825 (Flieden–Elm); 3828 (third track: Fulda Bronnzell–Fulda)
- Locale: Hesse and Lower Saxony, Germany

Service
- Route number: 610, 615, 540.1, 611, 613

Technical
- Line length: 240 km (150 mi)
- Num of tracks: 2 (throughout)
- Track gauge: 1,435 mm (4 ft 8 1/2 in) standard gauge
- Electrification: 15 kV 16.7 Hz AC Overhead line
- Operating speed: 200 km/h (120 mph) (maximum)

The Frankfurt–Göttingen railway is a continuously double track and electrified main line in Hesse and southern Lower Saxony, Germany. The line was initially built from Bebra towards Fulda by the Kurhessen State Railway. After the Prussian annexation of the Electorate of Hesse as a result of the Austro-Prussian War of 1866, it was completed to Frankfurt as the Frankfurt-Bebra Railway. The line was later extended from Bebra to Göttingen.

During the division of Germany, it became part of one of the most important German north-south axes in long-distance rail freight and rail passenger transport, the North–South railway. The route continues to be of great importance for traffic, but has been relieved in sections since 1991 by the Hanover–Würzburg high-speed railway. Further new lines are being planned as part of the Aus- und Neubaustrecke Hanau–Würzburg/Fulda–Erfurt ("Hanau-Würzburg/Fulda-Erfurt upgraded and new line") project.

== History ==
When railways began to be built in Germany in the nineteenth century, the two largest cities of the Electorate of Hesse (Kurfürstentum Hessen, shortened to Kurhessen), which had been re-established by the Congress of Vienna in 1815, were its capital Kassel and the city of Hanau in its far south. Initially it was not practical to build a railway to connect Kurhessen through the mountainous country between Hanau and Fulda. Instead a railway was established jointly by the three countries of Kurhessen, the Grand Duchy of Hesse and Free City of Frankfurt, and completed between Frankfurt and Kassel in 1852. Meanwhile, the Frankfurt–Hanau railway was opened in 1848 by the Frankfurt-Hanauer Eisenbahn-Gesellschaft (Frankfurt–Hanau Railway Company), allowing a connection between Kassel and Hanau via Frankfurt, although the lines were not physically linked.

In order to reach Hanau through the Kurhessian area, it would be necessary to start from the town of Bebra, which was on the line of the Friedrich-Wilhelms-Nordbahn-Gesellschaft ("Frederick William Northern Railway Company") and could be reached from Kassel. A railway line could be built via Fulda to Hanau. The Kurhessische Staatsbahn ("Kurhessen State Railway") was given the commission to construct the line by a decision of the Kurhessian Estates Assembly (Kurhessische Ständeversammlung) on 19 March 1863.

=== Construction ===
The first section between Bebra and Hersfeld was opened on 22 January 1866. After the annexation of the Electorate of Hesse by Prussia following the Austro-Prussian War in 1866, the project was taken over by Prussia and construction began in the southern section as well. In order not to leave Kurhessian territory, the railway followed the valley of the Haune and not that of the Fulda, which belonged to the Grand Duchy of Hesse. A winding route was accepted for this. The Kingdom of Prussia was able to open the line to Hanau within two years.

As late as 1864, the former Free City of Frankfurt had prevented the line from being continued to Frankfurt and also refused the Frankfurt–Hanau Railway Company permission to use the Frankfurt East–Hanau–Aschaffenburg route, even though it ran through Kurhessian territory. After Prussia had also annexed Frankfurt in the Peace of Prague, trains from Bebra could now run via Hanau station to Frankfurt. However, since this was in the east of Frankfurt and thus far away from the Frankfurt western stations and the lines ending there, the trains were connected to the Main-Neckar station (Main-Neckar-Bahnhof) via the Frankfurt City Link Line from 1869.

=== Extension to Frankfurt ===
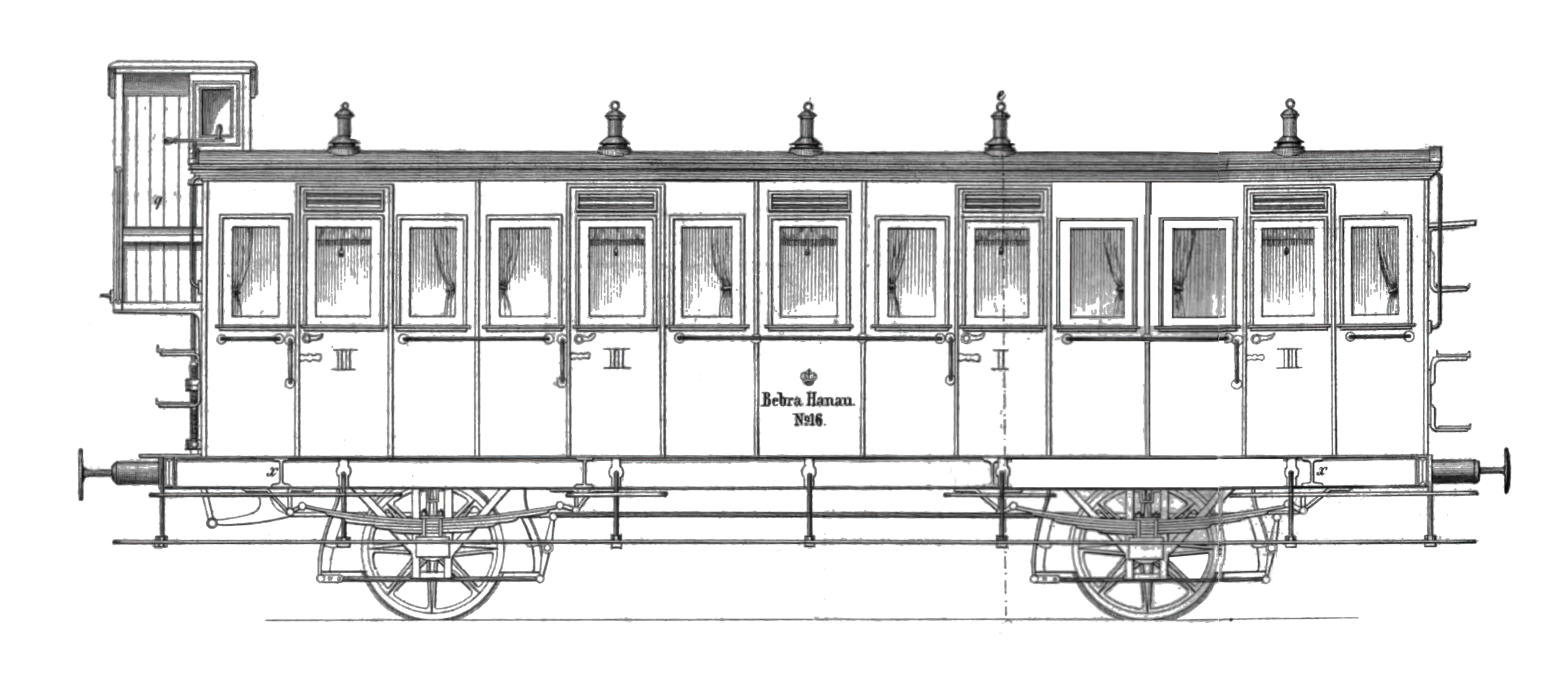
Car no. 16, 1./2. class of the Bebra-Hanauer Eisenbahn, about 1869

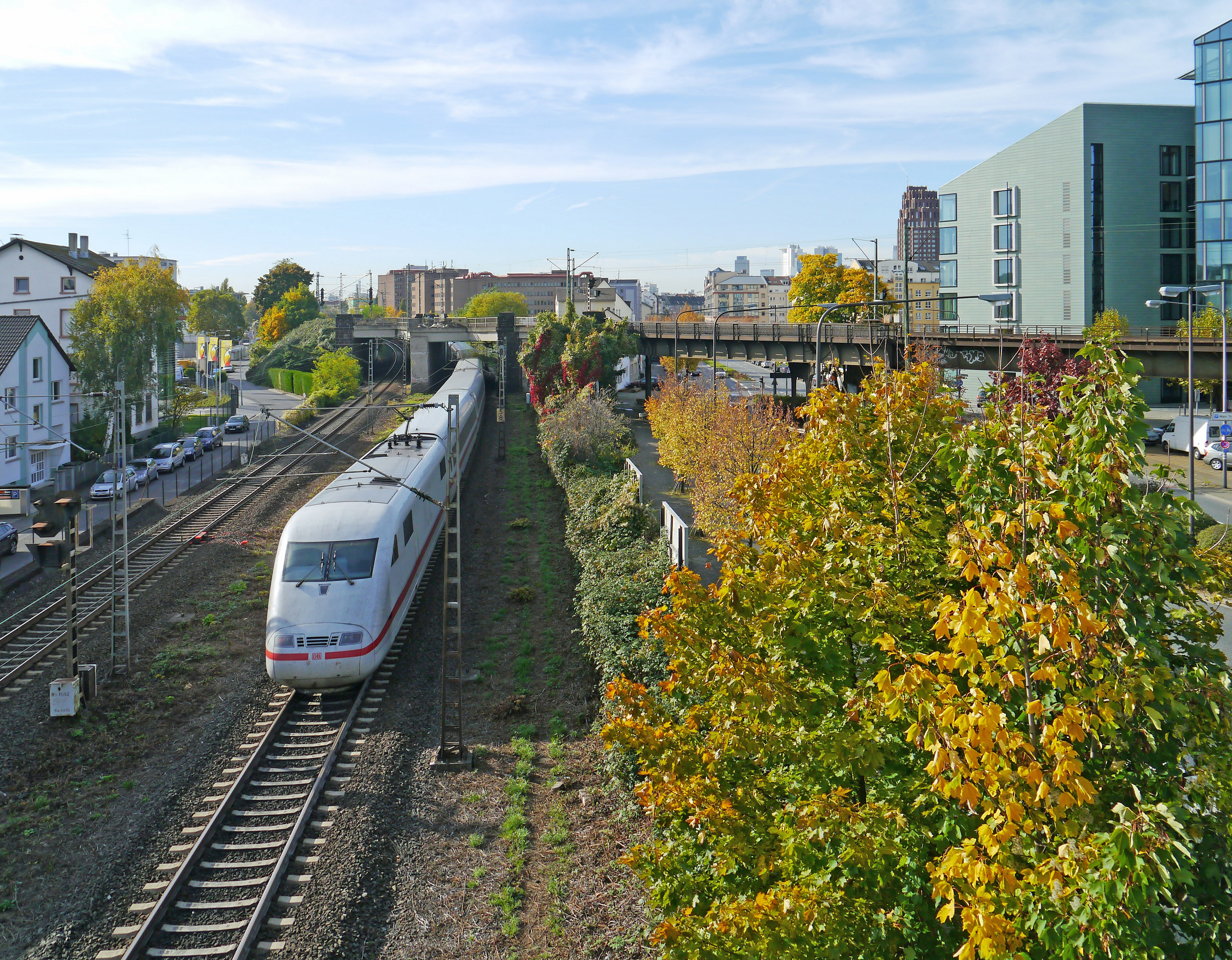
Frankfurt-Sachsenhausen: in front the southern Main route, on the right the North Main line on the Deutschherrn Bridge

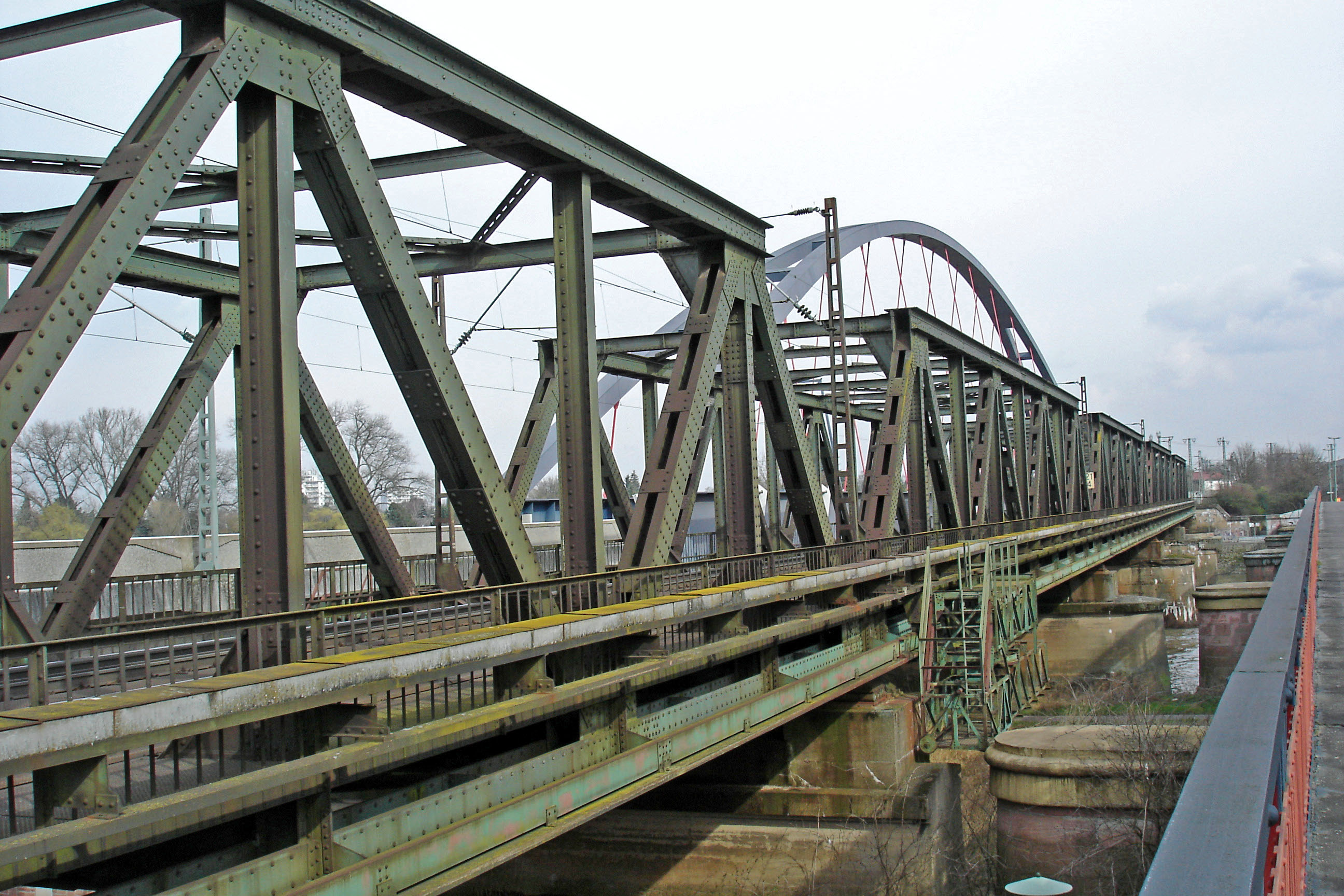
Steinheim Main Bridge

The North Main connection via the Frankfurt–Hanau Railway Company line had several disadvantages. It meant a detour and bypassed the town of Offenbach am Main, not least because the capacity of the city link line was limited. So there were plans for a southern Main line that would connect with the Frankfurt–Offenbach Local Railway in Offenbach. However, the tracks of the local railway were not designed to handle long-distance railway traffic, so a new long-distance line was built on an embankment, which bypassed the centres of Sachsenhausen and Offenbach to the south. The proposed line ran through the Grand Duchy of Hesse. This section of the new railway line was therefore authorised a state treaty of 12 June 1868. This state treaty determined, among other things, in Article 21, that:

- all scheduled trains that transport passengers had to stop at the station for Offenbach and
- at all stops for Steinheim and Mühlheim, at least three trains would stop daily in each direction to arrange passenger traffic to and from the other stations of the Hanau-Frankfurt railway and, as far as practicable, also to and from the connecting railways.

In Hanau, the line could not be routed through the then Hanau station (now Hanau West) as it was not well-located for the location specified for the Main crossing. Instead, Hanau Ost station (now Hanau Hauptbahnhof) was built a little further south-east, at the point where the Frankfurt–Bebra railway crosses the Frankfurt–Hanau Railway Company line to Aschaffenburg.

The opening of the new line was delayed until the completion of the Steinheim Main Bridge. The line was first put into operation to Bebra station (now Frankfurt (Main) Süd station) in Sachsenhausen on 15 November 1873.

In 1874 the new railway was subordinated to the Direction der Bebra-Hanauer Bahn (railway division of the Bebra-Hanau Railway), which was relocated from Kassel to Frankfurt and from 1 April 1874 was called the Königliche Eisenbahn-Direction zu Frankfurt am Main (Royal Railway Division of Frankfurt am Main). On 15 November 1874, the Bebra-Hanauer Eisenbahn (Bebra-Hanau Railway) was renamed the Frankfurt-Bebraer Eisenbahn (Frankfurt-Bebra Railway).

Trains from Sachsenhausen could reach Frankfurt's Main-Neckar station from 1 December 1875.

Opening dates
22 January 1866	Bebra–Bad Hersfeld
1 October 1866	Bad Hersfeld–Hünfeld–Fulda
1 May 1867	Hanau (Ost)–Wächtersbach
1 July 1868	Fulda–Neuhof
1 July 1868	Wächtersbach–Steinau (Straße)
15 December 1868	Neuhof–Steinau (Straße) (including the zig zag in Elm station)
15 November 1873	Hanau (Ost)–Frankfurt Bebraer station
1 December 1875	Frankfurt Bebraer station–Frankfurt Main-Neckar station

=== Extension to Göttingen ===
The section from Friedland (Han) to Göttingen was built in 1867 as part of a connecting line from Arenshausen on the Halle–Hann. Münden railway to the Hanoverian Southern Railway.

After the annexation of Hanover and Kurhessen, the Prussian state railways wanted to connect the Hanoverian Southern Railway and the Frankfurt-Bebra Railway directly. A north–south axis was to be created together with the Elm–Gemünden railway that was planned at the same time. In addition, the also planned, militarily important Kanonenbahn ("Cannons Railway") would have connections to the north (Hannover–Göttingen) and south (Bebra–Hanau). Arenshausen and Witzenhausen were also discussed as connections in the north, but agreement was reached on a link in Friedland and a link with the Halle–Hann. Münden railway in Eichenberg. On 25 March 1872, the Prussian state decided to build a line from Bebra to Friedland and a branch line from Niederhone to Eschwege.

The section from Bebra to Niederhone (now Eschwege West) and from there the first section of the Cannons Railway to Eschwege station were opened in 1875. A year later, the Niederhone–Eichenberg–Friedland section followed. In order to cross the watersheds between the Fulda and the Werra near Cornberg and between the Werra and the Leine near Eichenberg, considerable gradients and four tunnels were necessary and the route had many curves.

The direct connection between Friedland and Arenshausen was abandoned in 1884 as the connection via Eichenberg was sufficient.

=== Development up to the Second World War ===
To connect to the new Central-Bahnhof Frankfurt ("Frankfurt Central Station", now Frankfurt (Main) Hauptbahnhof), a new line had to be built from Sachsenhausen to a point about a kilometre further to the south-west. For this purpose, the new Main-Neckar Bridge was built from 1881 and opened on 1 August 1885 initially only for freight traffic. After the closure of the Frankfurt West station and the opening of the Central Station on 18 August 1888, the old line over the old Main-Neckar Bridge (now the Friedensbrücke) was abandoned.

From 1908 to 1910, the railway facilities in Göttingen were redesigned: the tracks were raised, a marshalling yard (that is now closed) was built and the Göttingen–Bodenfelde railway was connected. The railway to Bebra also received a new route from Göttingen to Rosdorf west of Leineberg. Before that, the line separated from the Hanover–Kassel line at Göttingen station and ran almost in a straight line south towards Rosdorf, hence the Eisenbahnstraße ("Railway Street") in the Leineviertel (the area south of Göttingen station on the east bank of the Leine).

The topographic problem was crossing the ridge between Flieden and Schluechtern. With the technical means available at the time when the railway was being built, a tunnel of almost 4 km in length was initially too complex and expensive. Instead, a zig zag was built—with Elm as the zig zag station. Here, all through trains had to change direction, which became increasingly unacceptable with increasing traffic and the connection of the Flieden–Gemünden railway in Elm in 1873. The technology for building longer tunnels was improved at the beginning of the 20th century and, in particular, significantly improved by the dynamite that was now available. The construction of the Schluechtern Tunnel under the Distelrasen range began in 1909. This was completed on 14 February 1914 and went into operation on 1 May.

In 1914, a connecting curve was opened south of Bebra, which enabled journeys from Frankfurt to Leipzig to Berlin without having to change direction in Bebra. So it is called the Berliner Kurve ("Berlin curve").

The regional traffic volume in the sparsely populated region north of Fulda was low. The branch lines that branched off did not increase traffic much. The Bad Hersfeld–Treysa railway was opened from Bad Hersfeld in 1906. Some of it is still used for freight transport. The Hersfeld Kreisbahn (Hersfeld District Railway) also branched off in Bad Hersfeld from 1912 to 1993. In Hünfeld there was a connection via Eiterfeld to Vacha. From Götzenhof it was possible to travel through the northern Rhön to Hilders from 1889 to 1986.

In 1939, four pairs of Durchgangszug (express trains with corridor coaches) ran between Göttingen and Bebra each day, while twelve expresses ran on the neighbouring Main–Weser Railway between Kassel and Frankfurt.

During the Second World War, the strategically important line was the target of Allied air raids, notably on 4 December 1944 near Schluechtern and Gelnhausen.

=== Division of Germany ===
Since 1866, national borders between Eichenberg and Bebra had been irrelevant. That changed in 1945 when Germany was divided into occupation zones. A section about four kilometers long near Werleshausen south of Eichenberg ran through the Soviet occupation zone. In order to ease this situation, an exchange of territories was agreed in the Wanfried Agreement in 1945. After the agreement was concluded, the participating officers exchanged flasks of whisky and vodka, and from then on the railway line was known jokingly in German as the Whisky-Wodka-Linie.

As a result of the new border, the line was consistently in the area of the Western Allies and thus completely on the territory of the later Federal Republic. All eastbound routes from Eichenberg (Halle–Hann. Münden railway) and Eschwege (Kanonenbahn, several branch lines) were interrupted by the border.

Until the Second World War, it was mainly used for traffic on the Frankfurt–Leipzig route. Due to the division of Germany, this east–west traffic came to a standstill—apart from transit and interzone trains, which now operated with a change of locomotive and direction of travel in Bebra. As a result, the main traffic direction shifted to north–south, from Hanover and Hamburg to Frankfurt and also via the Flieden–Gemünden railway towards Bavaria. The latter axis became an important connection in the Federal Republic, known as the North–South railway. In the summer of 1989, 37 long-distance trains ran between Göttingen and Bebra per day in each direction.

In order to be able to handle the traffic, the line was upgraded. As early as the 1950s, more powerful signal boxes were built, which enabled "track change operations" (safe operations in either direction on either track) on the inclines before Cornberg and Eichenberg. The commissioning of track change operations from Bebra to Cornberg took place on 17 October 1951.

On 30 September 1961, the electrified line between Hanau and Fulda was ceremonially opened for operation as the first electrified section of the north–south line., the 4000th electrified kilometre in the Deutsche Bundesbahn network had been celebrated near Wächtersbach in September 1961. A total of around 3,000 catenary masts, 250 kilometres of catenary and a traction current line with several hundred high-voltage pylons were erected, which connected the Aschaffenburg power station with the new Flieden substation. In addition to several bridges that were rebuilt to create the necessary clearance, the porous vault of the Schluechtern tunnel had to be renovated.

By 1963 the remaining sections were electrified. To make room for the overhead line, the Braunhausen tunnel was converted into a cutting, and the tracks in the other tunnels were lowered.

Many smaller stations were abandoned so that the local trains that stopped would not impede the intercity trains. This happened at Obernjesa in 1989.

=== Development and new construction ===
==== Hanover–Würzburg high-speed line ====
As early as the 1960s, it became clear that the entire North–South railway was too congested and too slow to adequately handle long-distance traffic. At Eichenberg, the curves only allow 90 km/h, at Bebra only 70 km/h. This led to the planning and construction of the Hanover–Würzburg high-speed railway, which took over the high-speed long-distance traffic on the north–south axis between Göttingen and Fulda in 1991. Freight trains, night trains and regional services stayed on the old line.

In the course of the discussion about connecting Fulda to the new Hanover–Würzburg line, it was considered in the first half of the 1970s that the new line would bypass Fulda and only provide links to the existing line to the north and south of Fulda. Later it was decided that the line would pass through Fulda instead. During the construction phase of the new line, the connection of the Frankfurt–Göttingen line to the Fulda junction was changed. Since then, both southbound tracks have left the junction next to each other before the new track towards Würzburg crosses the track towards Frankfurt at the southern flying junction. In addition, a centrally located flying junction was built, which provides a grade-separated connection to the eastern track of the line from Frankfurt with the platform next to the station building of Fulda station (track 1).

==== Hanau–Fulda upgrade project ====
The upgrade of the line was already part of the development program for the Deutsche Bundesbahn network presented in 1970. In the Federal Transport Routes Plan (Bundesverkehrswegeplan) of 1973, the Flieden–Frankfurt am Main section was listed as one of eight planned upgrade routes in the field of railways. The route was no longer included in the 1976 coordinated investment program for federal transport routes up to 1985. The available investment funds would thus be concentrated on the six upgraded lines and the two new lines that had been started at this time. The development project was also not included in the Federal Transport Routes Plan 1980. As early as the mid-1980s, the line was considered to be congested and the operational quality was very unsatisfactory in some sections.

In mid-1984, the Bundesbahn division (Bundesbahndirektion) in Frankfurt am Main began investigating how to update the Federal Transport Route Plan. An iterative procedure was to be used to identify sections of the route that would allow the greatest possible reduction in travel time by means of small upgrade steps and pieces of new infrastructure. An upgrade allowing a speed of 200 km/h was aimed at. For the individual sections of the Kinzig Valley Railway, the investigation showed very different costs due to variable topographies and structures. This resulted in a package of measures worth DM 460m (1984 prices). Depending on the train design, a travel time reduction of six to nine minutes should be achieved on the 103-kilometer section compared to the travel time of an Intercity train of 54 minutes in 1985. The line capacity would be increased by around fifty trains per day and direction. A joint investigation of the Kinzig Valley route and the Riedbahn (Mannheim–Frankfurt railway) commissioned by the Federal Ministry of Transport resulted in a benefit–cost ratio of 15. With a total investment of DM 960m (1983 prices), an annual contribution to the net results of the Bundesbahn of DM 256m per year was expected. The section between Fulda and Frankfurt was estimated to cost DM 460m. These results led to the project being listed in the "urgent needs" of the Federal Transport Routes Plan 1985. The measure was to be implemented as quickly as possible and essentially completed in 1991 for the start of ICE traffic.

Immediately after the Federal Transport Route Plan was approved in 1985, the Bundesbahn began planning the development project. As part of the preliminary planning completed in 1986, it was intended to create three 200 km/h high-speed sections with a total length of 55 kilometres: between Hanau-Wolfgang and Gelnhausen-Höchst, north of Wächtersbach and between the Flieden and Fulda areas. Between the southern and the middle high-speed section, the line should be able to be operated at 170 km/h. The lowest target speed of 110 km/h would be reached in Hanau-Wolfgang and Schluechtern. Major line improvements for the project were planned in Kerzell, Neuhof, Bad Soden-Salmünster and Wirtheim, with smaller works in Wächtersbach and Gelnhausen. Five passing tracks were to be built and five more were to be extended. In addition, six new signal boxes and four new platform edges were to be built. Five signal boxes and a total of 41 bridges were to be rebuilt and the entire route equipped with the Linienzugbeeinflussung train control system.

An audit by the Deutsche Bundesbahn headquarters showed that the specified budget of DM 460m would be exceeded by DM 72m. The upgrade targets were therefore reduced. By reducing the upgrade target in the section between Bad Soden-Salmünster and Haitz-Höchst from 200 or 170 km/h to 160 or 150 km/h, DM 65m would be saved with a reduced travel time gain of 0.7 minutes. In addition, an overtaking track south of Gelnhausen and a transfer point with a total cost of around DM 5m were to be dispensed with.

The planning from 1988 envisaged expanding the Wolfgang–Gelnhausen section to three tracks to enable 200 km/h operations by 1991. An extension of the three-track development to Wächtersbach was taken into account in the planning. The Neuhof–Fulda section was to follow by 1994. DM 66 million of an estimated DM 460m was spent between 1986 and 1989.

After the state of Hesse had requested a spatial planning procedure for the three-track expansion from Hanau to Gelnhausen and the line improvements at Kerzell and Neuhof on 1 December 1986, there were delays. By the end of 1988, the expansion target that had been aimed for up to 1991 had been reduced to an approximately 12-kilometer high-speed section between Rodenbach and Hailer-Meerholz. By then, all spatial planning procedures, with the exception of the Neuhof section, had been completed and most of the planning approval procedures had been initiated. In 1989, the last of four spatial planning procedures for the Neuhof area was completed. 65 individual measures were planned along the 103 kilometres of the route. At the end of 1989, 13 projects were under construction.

The official start of upgrade was marked by the symbolic driving of a first pile by the then Hessian State Secretary for Economic Affairs, Dieter Posch, on 27 September 1989 in Steinau an der Straße. According to the planning status of 1989, the approximately 25-kilometre-long section between Hanau-Wolfgang and Gelnhausen-Höchst and the approximately 15-kilometre section between Flieden and the southern outskirts of Fulda were intended to be upgraded to 200 km/h. In the course of the decision on the future of the Schluechtern tunnel, an extension of the northern high-speed section by a further 8 kilometres to the south would also be examined. Along the rest of the route, 120 to 160 km/h would be possible. Drops in line speeds after completion of the upgrade were planned for Hanau-Wolfgang (90 km/h) and Schluechtern (100 km/h). Including the elimination of level crossings, around 120 individual measures were planned. After completion of the upgrade measures, speeds of 200 km/h would be possible on around 37 kilometres of track. Together with the upgrade of the Mannheim–Frankfurt railway, the journey time between Fulda and Mannheim was initially to be reduced by seven minutes for the start of ICE operations (1991) and by 15 minutes compared to the initial situation by 1995.

The development work began in 1987; completion was planned (in 1991) for 1994. The construction of the Schluechtern Tunnel was the most important sub-project. The second stage was originally to be completed by the time the Hanover–Würzburg and Mannheim–Stuttgart high-speed lines were fully operational (1991). There were delays in the planning approval process, especially when removing the 20 level crossings.

In 1990, it was planned to spend DM 610m within six years, of which DM 150m would be financed by other parties to eliminate level crossings. Half of the DB investment costs of DM 460m would serve to increase capacity and increase performance. The third track between Hanau and Gelnhausen alone was estimated to cost DM 179m.

By the beginning of 1991, four of the 25 planning approval sections had been completed, 13 were under construction, five were in the planning approval process and three were in planning. As of 1990, the overall project was to be completed in the second half of the 1990s.

When scheduled ICE operations began on 2 June 1991, the high-speed section (200 km/h) between Hanau-Wolfgang and Hailer-Meerholz was put into operation. In addition, the Bronnzell–Flieden, Ahl–Wächtersbach and Wirtheim–Niedermittlau sections have since been authorised to be operated at 160 km/h. By the end of 1991, a total of DM 281m had been invested out of an estimated DM 630m (1 January 1991 prices).

In 1992, the line was one of the five lines that were primarily to be equipped with CIR-ELKE high-performance signalling blocks.

On 22 May 1993, the third track between Hanau and Hailer-Meerholz (19 kilometres) went into operation. Like the parallel tracks in this section, it is largely designed for speeds of 200 km/h. A total of DM 230m were invested in the four-year three-track upgrade, combined with upgrading the existing tracks for 200 km/h, including around DM 150m for the third track. A total of around 200,000 cubic metres of earth were removed and temporarily stored. The strength of some of the subsoil had to be reinforced.

==== Frankfurt–Hanau S-Bahn line ====
The construction of the Frankfurt Schlachthof–Hanau railway via Offenbach at the end of the 20th century also affected a large part of the existing track infrastructure. Since then, the platforms of Offenbach Ost station have only been served by the S-Bahn, while the old main line was relocated to a new route to the north of, and parallel with, the old line.

At the former Steinheim (Main) station, the entrance building to the south of the old line was demolished and an outside platform was built on the north side of the new S-Bahn line.

The entrance building of the former Mühlheim (Main) station built in 1873 has been preserved as a cultural monument. The platform close to the entrance building was closed. The trains on the main line pass now through without stopping. An island platform was retained for the double-track S-Bahn line.

=== After German reunification ===
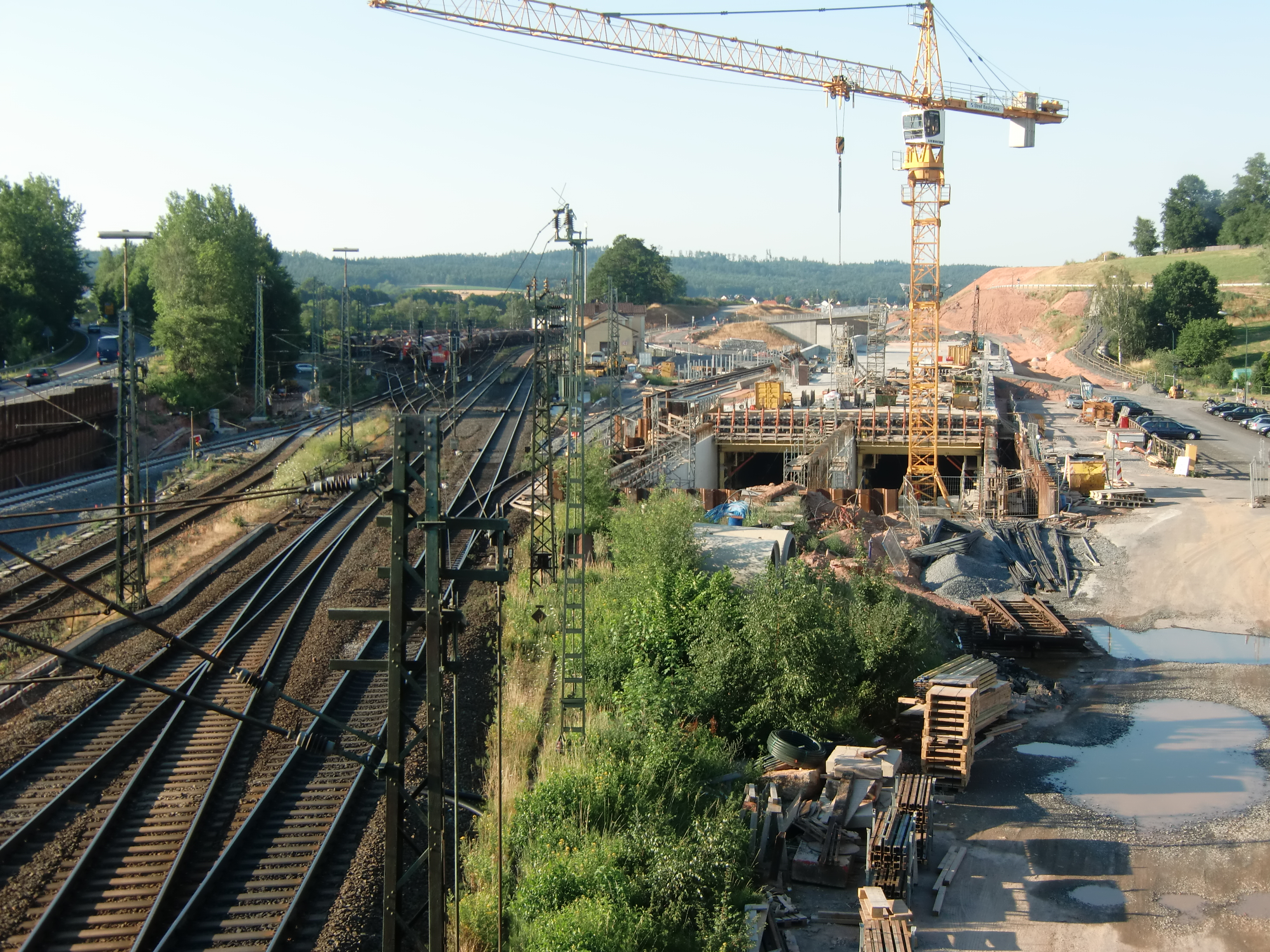
Construction site of autobahn 66 in the area of the Neuhof station (2010)

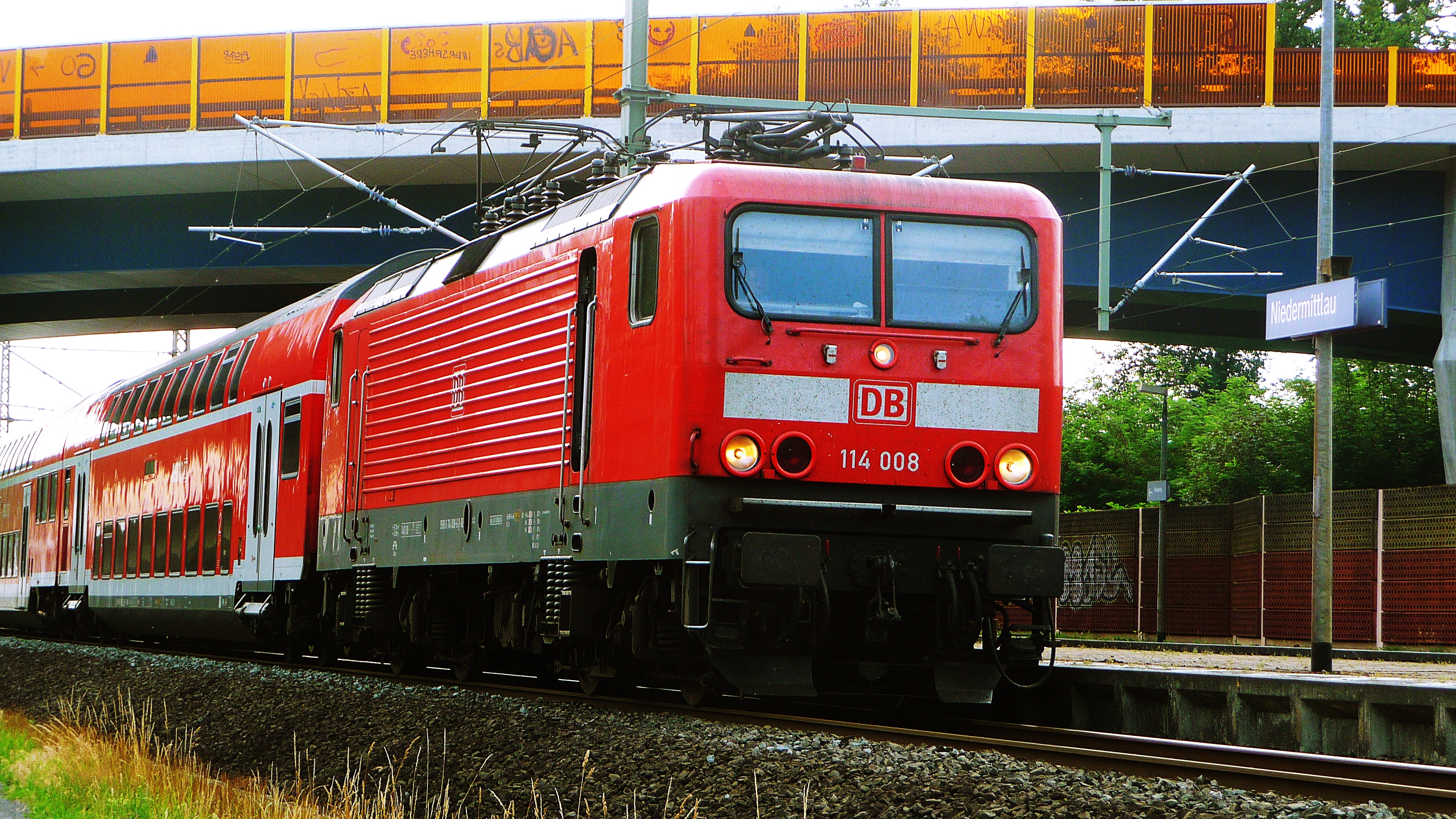
A Regionalbahn train from Wächtersbach to Frankfurt makes an unscheduled stop on platform 3 of Niedermittlau station. The bridge of the bypass from Gründau to Niedermittlau can be seen in the background.

After 1945, the Halle–Hann. Münden railway was interrupted at the Inner German border, which was abolished in July 1990. The line reopened east of Eichenberg at the same time. In 1998, a connecting curve was built north-east of Eichenberg, which enables direct journeys from Göttingen to Heilbad Heiligenstadt. It thus resumed the function of the Arenshausen–Friedland railway, which had been abandoned in 1884.

On 2 February 1995, scheduled use of double-decker coaches began on the line between Hanau and Fulda, half funded by Deutsche Bahn and half by the state of Hesse (from funds from the Municipal Transport Financing Act).

With the possibility of being able to overtake regional trains "on the fly" as a result of the establishment of bidirectional track operations, longer waiting times in the stations could be avoided. The travel time on the 55-kilometre Wächtersbach–Frankfurt line fell by up to 18 minutes; the number of working-day regional trains was increased from 87 to 91 when it went into operation.

From 2007, DB Netz built the new Schluechtern tunnel, which initially went into operation on two tracks in April 2011, and then renovated the old tunnel. At the beginning of 2014, the old tunnel was returned to operation, but as a single track. The second tunnel was reduced to one track by June 2014; since then, one track has been available for each direction. The permissible speed in this section was increased from 110 km/h to 140 km/h and then to 160 km/h as part of the renovation.

During the construction of the Autobahn 66 (Neuhof–Eichenzell), the line in the Neuhof area was rerouted over a 3.3-kilometre section. The line speed in the station area was increased from 130 km/h to 160 km/h. The estimated cost (as of 2006) was €56 m. Commissioning took place in stages up to the end of 2011.

Between 2010 and 2013, a new 1030 metre-long new building was drilled next to the Bebenroth tunnel and the previous tunnel was renovated. Since then, both tubes have only contained one track.

The Fulda–Bebra section was upgraded as part of the Fulda–Erfurt axis for the use of the eddy current brakes (for ICE 3 sets).

In December 2015, a bridge was built over the railway line in Niedermittlau, replacing the former level crossing.

In 2018, DB Netz set up electronic interlockings in Bad Hersfeld and Haunetal-Neukirchen. The Haunetal electronic interlocking, with a control centre in Bad Hersfeld, went into operation on 25 March 2019. It controls a roughly 25 km section between Mecklar and Burghaun.

At the end of December 2019, the Gelnhausen flood bridge was renewed, and temporary bridges that had been used for several years were upgraded. This meant that Gelnhausen station could once again be used at 160 km/h. The temporary bridges could be operated at 90 km/h.

On 9 April 2021, an electronic interlocking was put into operation in Flieden.

In July 2020, the Federal Railway Authority approved the construction of an electronic control centre in Wirtheim.

=== Hanau-Würzburg/Fulda-Erfurt construction project ===
After German reunification—even before the completion of the previous development project—due to the expected increase in traffic in the early 1990s, a partial four-track upgrade between Hanau and Fulda was examined. The traffic forecast for the Federal Transport Routes Plan 1992 provided for 36 long-distance passenger and 104 freight trains per day and direction for the year 2010 on the upgraded line. In mid-1994, Deutsche Bahn expected 38 long-distance passenger trains and 25 freight trains. The segregation of fast and slow traffic (Network 21) was not yet taken into account.

In addition, since the 1990s there have been considerations about building a new line for high-speed traffic. One solution that was discussed was the Mottgers Spange ("Mottgers clasp"), a new line that would have branched out from the existing line at Wächtersbach and merged into the high-speed line between Hanover and Würzburg at Mottgers in the Sinntal. The higher speeds could have reduced the travel times from Frankfurt to Fulda and to Würzburg by around ten minutes each. In addition, the little-used section of the Hanover-Würzburg high-speed line between Fulda and Würzburg would have been more heavily used. In the meantime, a "Nordspessart variant" was also considered as an alternative, which in fact largely corresponded to the Mottgers Spange.

A spatial sensitivity analysis from 2002 resulted in two possible solutions: a four-track upgrade between Hanau and Gelnhausen with a new line from Gelnhausen (Mottgers-Spange) and a four-track upgrade and a new Hanau-Gelnhausen-Fulda line with an additional Hanau–Aschaffenburg–Nantenbach (–Würzburg) upgrade. Based on this, Deutsche Bahn had developed a preliminary plan for the comparison of variants and included it in the spatial planning process. The necessary rebuilding of Hanau station would not have been part of the project.

In the Federal Transport Routes Plan 2030, an upgraded Hanau-Gelnhausen line and a new Gelnhausen-Fulda line are listed as "urgent needs". With more than 300 trains a day in freight, regional and long-distance traffic, the Fulda–Bebra section is also largely utilised, so a new route for the Fulda–Erfurt line is also part of the planning.

In January 2013, Deutsche Bahn and the Hessian Ministry of Transport announced that they would start further planning and that a project would be set up in the following months to develop the transport and operational tasks. Affected municipalities and citizens would be involved in the planning at an early stage.

==== Hanau–Gelnhausen line upgrade ====
According to the planning status of 2009, the third track would first be extended beyond Hailer-Meerholz station to Gelnhausen. A four-track development would be kept open as an option. Around 2014, a continuous four-track development between Hanau and Gelnhausen was planned. The Darmstadt Regional Council decided not to initiate a regional planning procedure. Deutsche Bahn hoped to begin an upgrade around 2020.

It is planned to run the tracks for long-distance traffic on the inside and the tracks for local traffic on the outside. The design speed is 230 km/h. In May 2017, the preliminary planning for the upgrade section was completed and construction is scheduled to start in 2025. However, in order for the development to begin at all, the Gelnhausen electronic control centre (ESTW) must be built and the existing level crossings must be removed. The ESTW is scheduled to go into operation in October 2023. The project is divided into seven planning approval sections. The eastern section between Gelnhausen Ost and Langenselbold Ost is scheduled to go into operation in 2030, and the remaining section to Hanau in 2036.

==== Gelnhausen–Kalbach new line ====
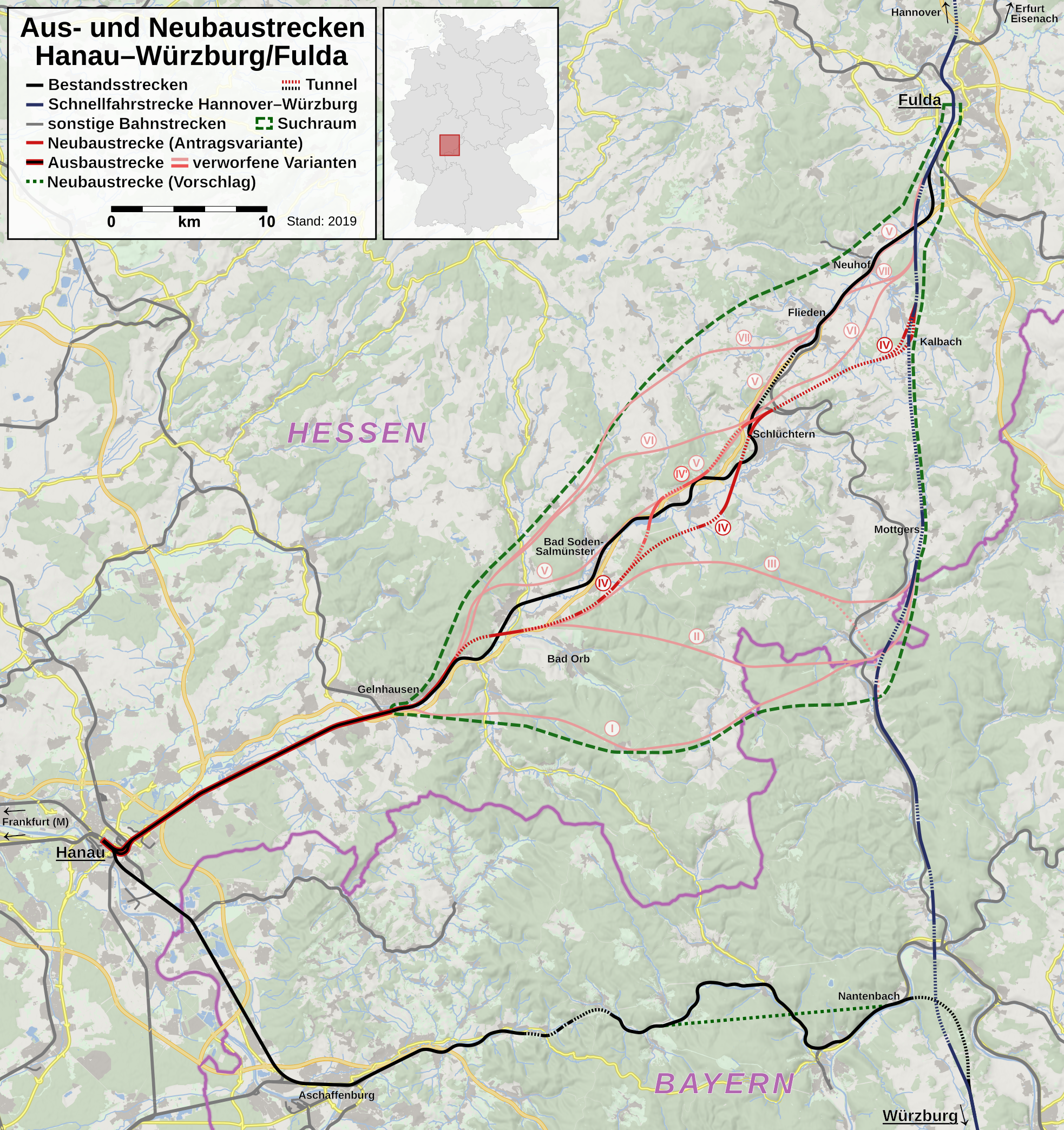
Map of the Hanau–Würzburg/Fulda project with variants of the Gelnhausen–Fulda new line. The current preferred variant is Variant IV with the eastern bypass of the Kinzig reservoir.

In contrast to the Hanau–Gelnhausen section, a "spatial planning procedure" (Raumordnungsverfahren) is required for the section north of Gelnhausen to Fulda, which ends with a state planning assessment of spatial compatibility. In addition to application option IV, option VII was also proposed by DB Netz during the regional planning procedure. Parallel to the regional planning process, exploratory drilling for the construction of the line began in July 2020.

Option IV, which was introduced by Deutsche Bahn as the preferred option in the upcoming spatial planning procedure, is to be built largely in a tunnel between Gelnhausen and Mittelkalbach. A 10 km long railway tunnel is planned between Schlüchtern and Mittelkalbach, which does not cross the land ridge on the shortest route from south to north (option V), but runs from Schlüchtern over a longer distance from west to east via the district of Rückers to Mittelkalbach. The planned connection to the high-speed line between Hanover and Würzburg would be in Mittelkalbach and a link to the existing line north of Schlüchtern is planned.

The municipalities of Bad Soden-Salmünster, Schlüchtern, Steinau and Kalbach, which were severely affected by option IV, have rejected this option.

==== Fulda–Bebra(–Gerstungen) ====
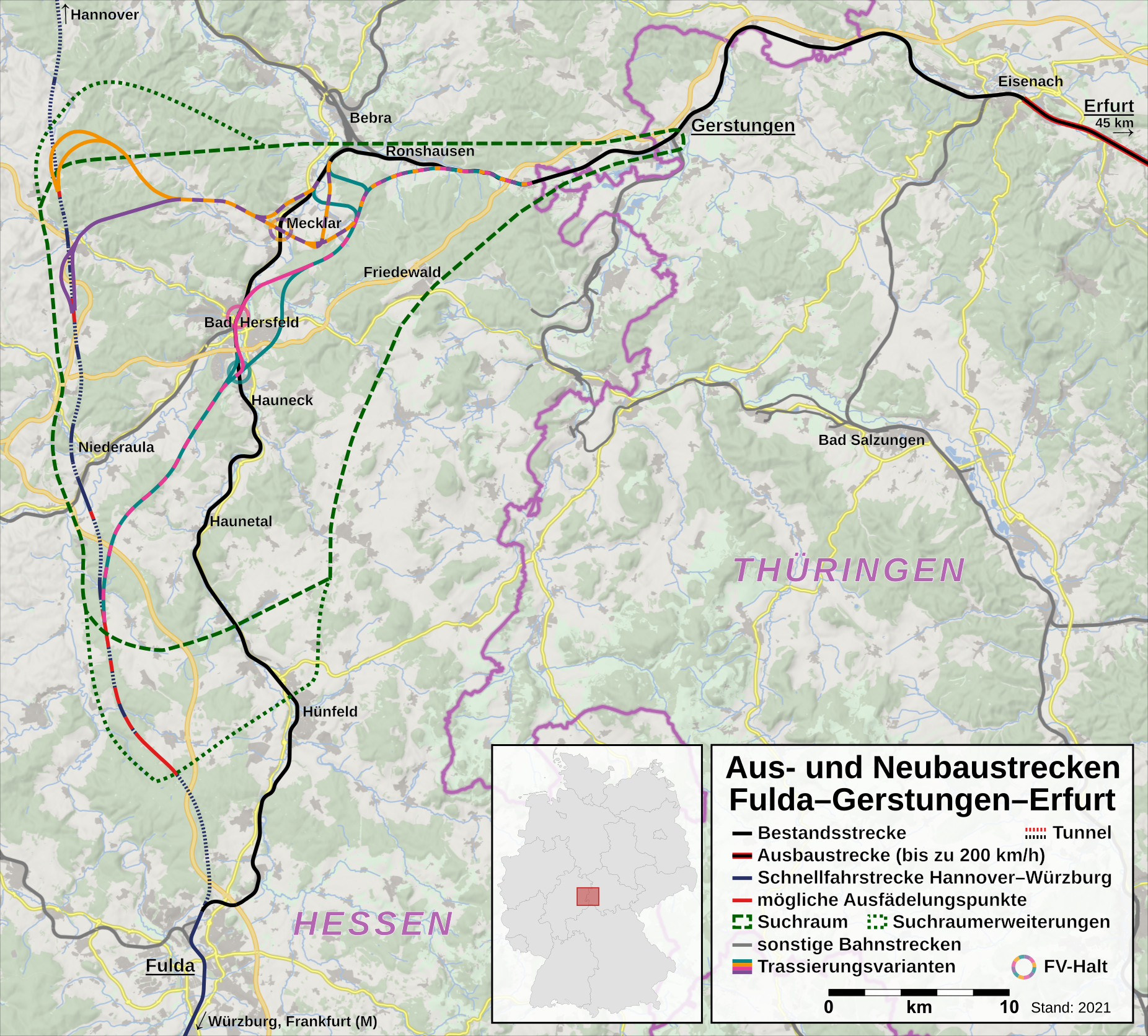
Search area for the Fulda–Gerstungen upgrade and new build project and upgrade of the existing Eisenach–Erfurt line

As part of the planning process, spatial planning for the course of a relief route has been underway since mid-2018, which will enable a direct link from Fulda to the line to Erfurt near Gerstungen.

=== Long-distance railway tunnel and the German integrated timetable ===
The planned Frankfurt long-distance railway tunnel, which is to run through Frankfurt in a west–east direction and which will make it possible for long-distance trains to operate through Frankfurt (Main) Hauptbahnhof without changing direction there, may exit the Hanau line at Offenbach. However, the exact course of the tunnel has not yet been determined.

To solve an expected bottleneck at the southern Main connection of the long-distance railway tunnel, an additional double-track line between Offenbach West and the north side of Hanau station operated at up to 200 km/h is assumed in the third expert draft of the proposed German integrated regular-interval timetable. The estimated cost of this work is €2.1b at 2015 prices. If a two-pronged eastern connection of the long-distance railway tunnel (to the lines north and south of the Main) is adopted, this new line will not be necessary.

=== Other plans ===
Rosdorf station is to be reopened for passenger trains. This was agreed between the State of Lower Saxony, Landesnahverkehrsgesellschaft Niedersachsen (Lower Saxony Regional Transport Association) and Deutsche Bahn on 28 March 2019.

== Route ==
The line runs south and parallel to the Main from Frankfurt to Hanau, then on the northern slope of the Kinzig valley, traverses the Hessian ridge and from there runs to Fulda.

From Fulda, the line continues north to Bad Hersfeld. Although both towns are on the Fulda, a route along the Haune was chosen in order not to leave the territory of the Electorate of Hesse. At the time the line was built, part of the Fulda valley belonged to the Grand Duchy of Hesse. In order to get from Fulda to the Haune valley, the mountain ridge between the two river valleys near Steinau, north-east of Fulda, had to be negotiated 0ver a complex line with a drop of fifty metres in altitude. The Burghaun tunnel was built near Burghaun to avoid a narrow valley east of the Haune. From Bad Hersfeld, where the Haune flows into the Fulda, the line runs back through the Fulda valley to Bebra.

The line leaves Bebra station in a loop and heads northeast into the Solz valley and then into a side valley to Braunhausen. From there, the valley of the Bebra was originally reached through the Braunhausen tunnel, which was converted into a cutting in 1962. The line then follows the route of the Bebra to the Cornberg tunnel, which passes through the ridge of land between the Bebra and the Cornberger Wasser; this is the watershed between Fulda and Werra. Along the Cornberger Wasser, the Sontra and the Wehre, the line descends to Eschwege-Niederhone, where the valley of the Werra is reached. The line continues north through this, with a loop of the Werra being shortened by the Schürzeberg tunnel. At Werleshausen, the line separates from the Werra and runs through the Bebenroth tunnel to Eichenberg. From there, the line descends into the valley of the Leine, which it follows to Göttingen.

== Train control ==
A 16-kilometre section between Hanau and Gelnhausen (line kilometers 24.8-40.3) is equipped with the Linienzugbeeinflussung cab signalling and train protection system, has three tracks and can be operated at up to 200 km/h. The rest of the line has two tracks and can be operated at up to 160 km/h.

Between Frankfurt Hbf and Hanau Hbf and between Haitz-Höchst and Flieden, the line is also equipped with the ZUB 262 speed control for tilting technology system, since there are curves in the area of Wirtheim, Wächtersbach and between Bad Soden-Salmünster and Flieden, some of which only have a maximum speed of 130 km/h (only 110 km/h between Bad Soden-Salmünster and Schlüchtern). With the introduction of ICE T sets on ICE route 50, the journey time should be reduced. Operating at high speeds (tilting technology) was not used for several years because of technical problems on the sets. From the end of 2022, all trains on route 50 are capable of using tilting again, but the travel time gains from the tilting technology only serve to reduce delays and are not included in the regular timetable.

== Operations ==
In 1993, around 300 trains ran daily on the section between Gelnhausen and Hanau. In about 2006, around 175 trains per day ran in each direction on the section between Flieden and Fulda. Of this, 23 percent was accounted for by long-distance passenger traffic, 18 percent by local passenger traffic and 59 percent by freight traffic. During peak passenger traffic, up to nine trains per hour and direction (five long-distance, four local trains) ran.

In 2015, 250 to 300 trains traveled the line every day.

The section between Hailer-Meerholz and Fulda was declared an overloaded railway on 30 September 2008. Since 2011, freight trains have been switched to other lines whenever possible. From December 2019, no additional train paths for passenger transport would be accepted between 6 a.m. and 10 p.m. that went beyond the concept of the 2018 working timetable. Two relief infrastructure measures were to be implemented in 2020 and 2021, which was intended exclusively to improve operational quality. An updated plan to increase railway capacity for the section was presented in 2021.

Between Hanau and Flieden there are about 60 freight trains per day and direction, between Flieden and Fulda there are about 110 (as of 2015). Due to the congestion, the majority of freight traffic runs separately from passenger traffic at night between 10 p.m. and 6 a.m.

The transport demand on the route is expected to increase by 25 percent in long-distance traffic by 2025 and by 53 percent in freight traffic (as of 2017).

=== Long-distance services ===
The line between Frankfurt and Aschaffenburg is the line with the most Intercity-Express trains in Germany, with nine ICE services running at least every two hours.

With the opening of the Hanover–Würzburg high-speed railway in 1991, the Fulda–Göttingen line lost the InterCity trains that ran between Hanover and Frankfurt or Würzburg. On the other hand, with the fall of the Inner German border in 1989, east–west long-distance traffic continued to be handled on the existing line and traffic levels increased. It has handled Intercity services every 120 minutes since 1992 and ICE services have run every 120 minutes since 2000 on the Dresden–Leipzig–Erfurt–Eisenach–Frankfurt line and individual Intercity trains run as relief trains. Since the 2017/2018 timetable change and the full commissioning of the new Erfurt–Leipzig/Halle high-speed railway, ICE route 11 has also been running from Munich via Stuttgart, Mannheim, Frankfurt, Fulda, Erfurt and Leipzig to Berlin. There is also night train service on the line consisting of ÖBB NightJet trains and the (now suspended) Paris–Moscow night train.

Service	Route	Frequency
ICE 11	Berlin – Leipzig – Erfurt – Fulda – Frankfurt – Mannheim – Stuttgart – Munich	120 min
ICE 12	Berlin – Braunschweig – Kassel-Wilhelmshöhe – Fulda – Hanau – Frankfurt – Mannheim – Karlsruhe – Basel SBB (– Interlaken Ost)	120 min
ICE 13	Berlin – Braunschweig – Kassel-Wilhelmshöhe – Fulda – Frankfurt Süd – Frankfurt Airport	120 min
ICE 15	(Binz – Stralsund –) Berlin – Halle – Erfurt – Frankfurt (– Darmstadt – Stuttgart)	120 min
ICE/ECE 20	(Kiel –) Hamburg – Kassel-Wilhelmshöhe – Frankfurt – Mannheim – Karlsruhe – Basel SBB (– Zürich – Chur)	120 min
ICE 22	(Kiel –) Hamburg – Kassel-Wilhelmshöhe – Frankfurt – Frankfurt Airport – Stuttgart	120 min
ICE 41	(Dortmund –) Essen – Duisburg – Köln Messe/Deutz – Frankfurt Airport – Frankfurt – Würzburg – Nuremberg – Munich (– Garmisch-Partenkirchen)	60 min
ICE 50	Dresden – Leipzig – Erfurt – Bad Hersfeld – Fulda – Frankfurt – Frankfurt Airport – Wiesbaden (or Darmstadt – Mannheim – Kaiserslautern – Saarbrücken)	120 min
ICE 91	(Dortmund – Duisburg/Wuppertal – Cologne – Koblenz – Frankfurt Airport –) Frankfurt – Hanau – Nuremberg – Passau – Vienna	120 min

=== Regional services ===
==== Frankfurt–Hanau–Fulda ====
There are three Regional-Express services and one Regionalbahn service. The trains of the Rhine-Main S-Bahn use the mostly parallel Frankfurt Schlachthof–Hanau railway. The following trains operate in local rail passenger transport:

Service	Route	Frequency
RE 50	Frankfurt – Frankfurt Süd – Offenbach – Hanau – Wächtersbach – Schlüchtern – Fulda	60 min
RB 51	Frankfurt – Frankfurt Süd – Offenbach – Hanau – Gelnhausen – Wächtersbach (– Bad Soden-Salmünster)	60 min
RE 55	Frankfurt – Frankfurt Süd – Offenbach – Hanau – Aschaffenburg – Würzburg (– Nuremberg)	120 min
RE 85	Frankfurt – Frankfurt Süd – Offenbach – Hanau – Groß-Umstadt Wiebelsbach – Erbach	120 min

Most trains on the RE50 and RB51 consist of a class 114 locomotive with 5 double-deck cars and a double-deck control car. Relief trains with a class 114 and 3 double-deck cars and a double-deck control car also run several times a day.

A new transport contract for regional transport between Frankfurt and Fulda was tendered in July 2021 and awarded to DB Regio AG in 2022. The contract runs from 14 December 2025 to 8 December 2040 and should cover 3.2 million train kilometres per year. New rolling stock of Alstom Coradia Stream HC, which are equipped with free WLAN and power points, are to be used. The journey time between Frankfurt and Fulda is to be reduced by 8 minutes.

==== Fulda–Bebra ====
Local transport has been operated by Cantus Verkehrsgesellschaft since 10 December 2006. The RB5 of the Nordhessischer Verkehrsverbund (NVV) runs every hour between Fulda and Kassel. In addition, the RE5 has been running between Bad Hersfeld and Kassel since 13 December 2020, also hourly. Some DB Regio regional express train pairs run from Bebra to Frankfurt and back during the peak hour under the designations "RE5" or "RE50".

==== Bebra–Göttingen ====
In passenger transport, Cantus Verkehrsgesellschaft runs hourly with Stadler Stadler Flirt sets between Göttingen, Eschwege and Bebra as RB 87 of the NVV.

When the timetable changed on 13 December 2009, the Nordhessischer Verkehrsverbund put the line between Eschwege West and Eschwege Stadt) back into operation under its own control and modernised it. A connecting curve to the route of the former Kanonenbahn was built north and south of Eschwege West station. This bypasses Eschwege West station, which therefore no longer has any scheduled passenger services. Eschwege-Niederhone station was also built.

== Gallery ==
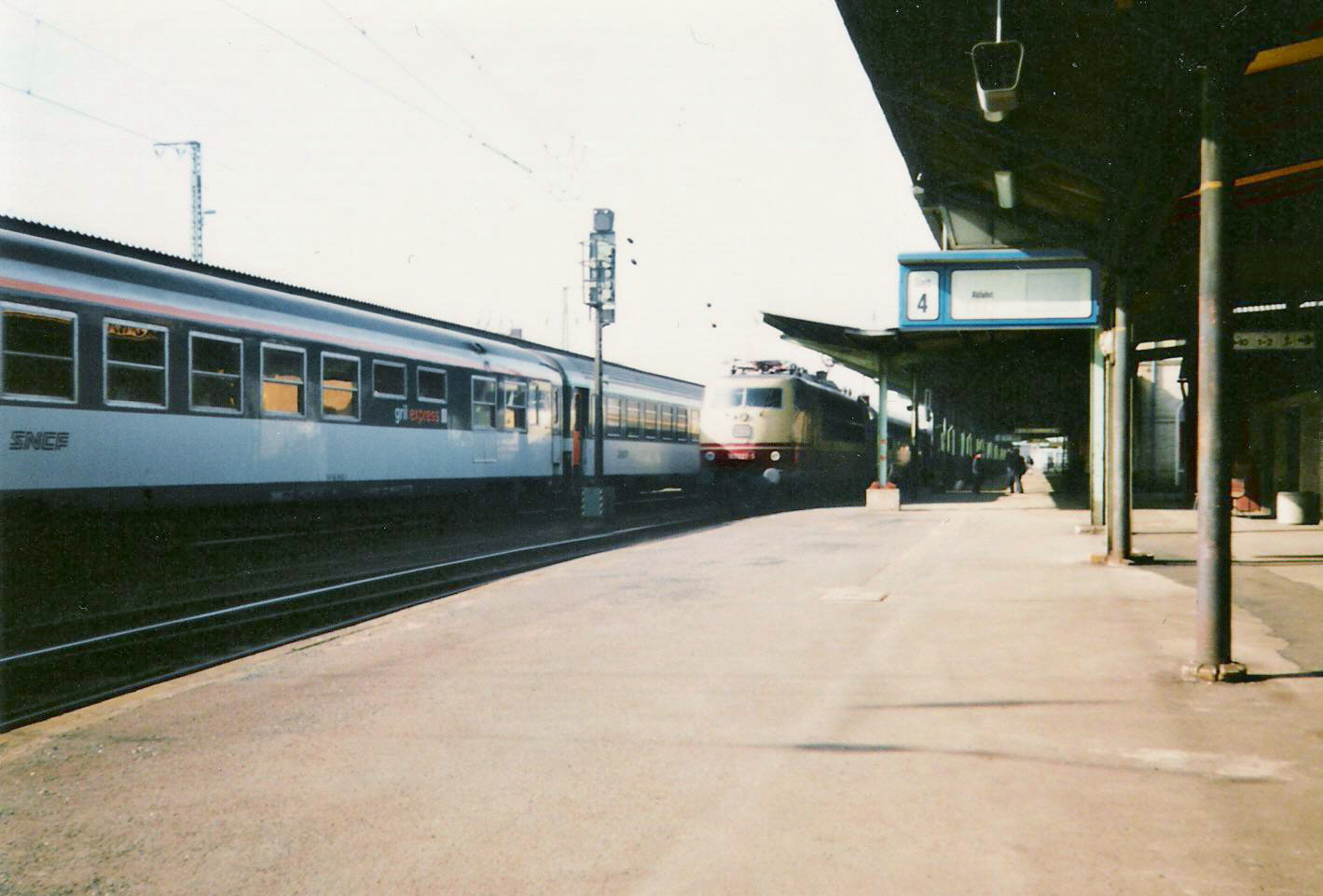
Platforms of Bebra station in the early 1990s

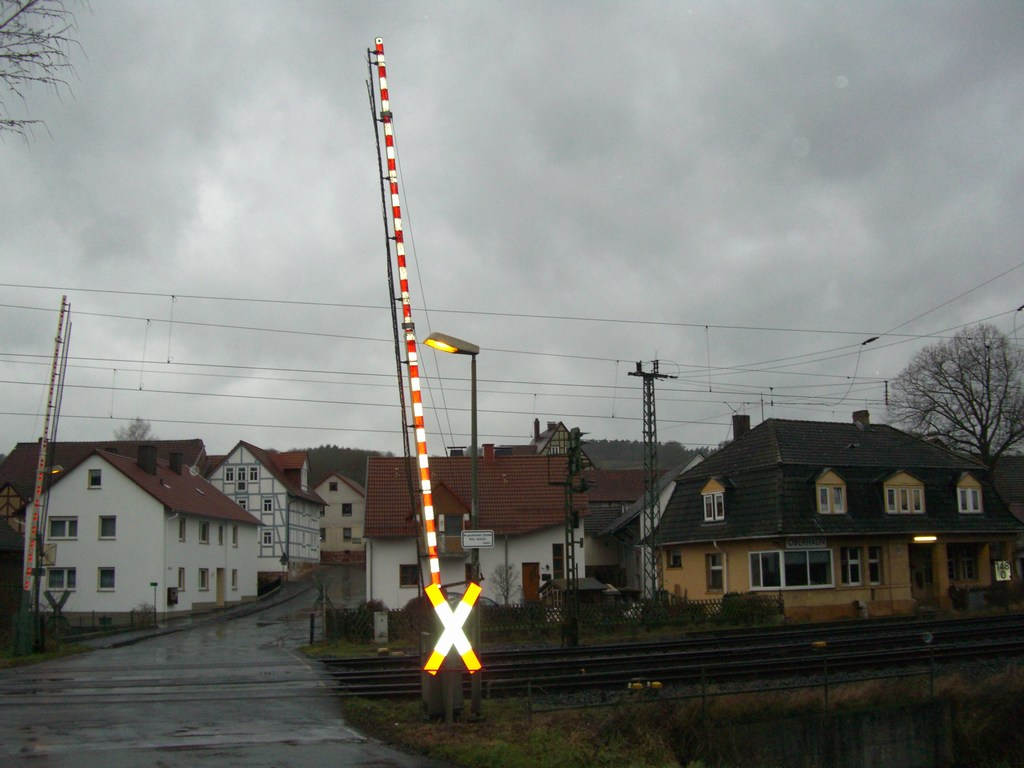
Manually operated level crossing in Oberhaun

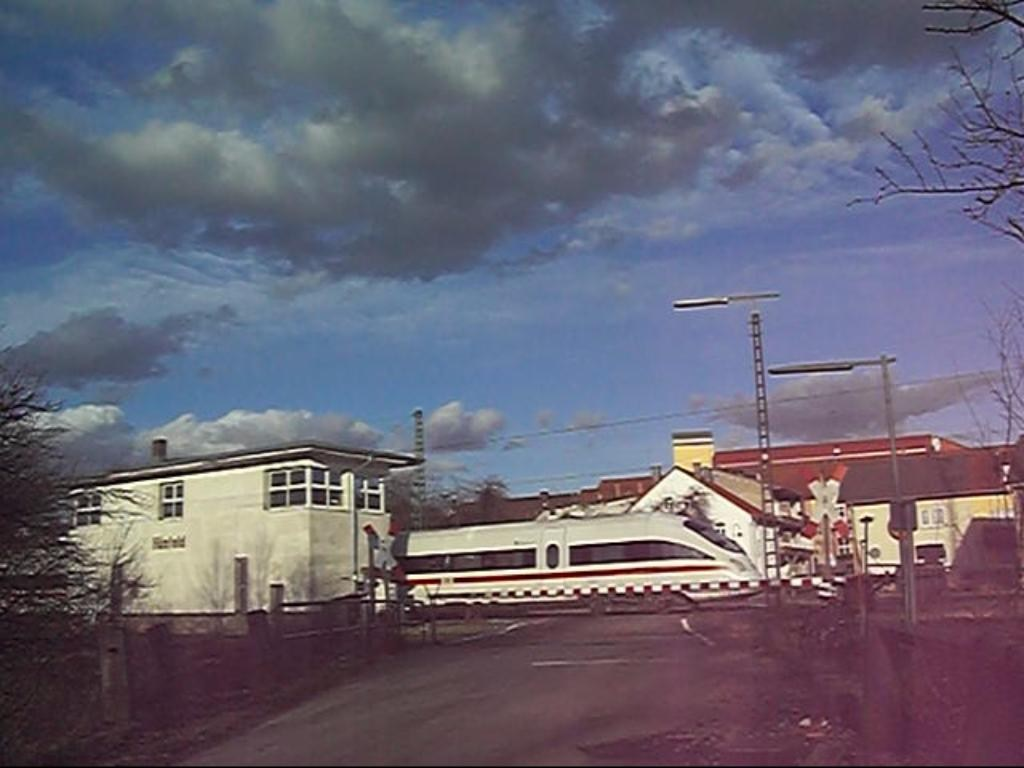
Intercity-Express at Hünfeld level crossing

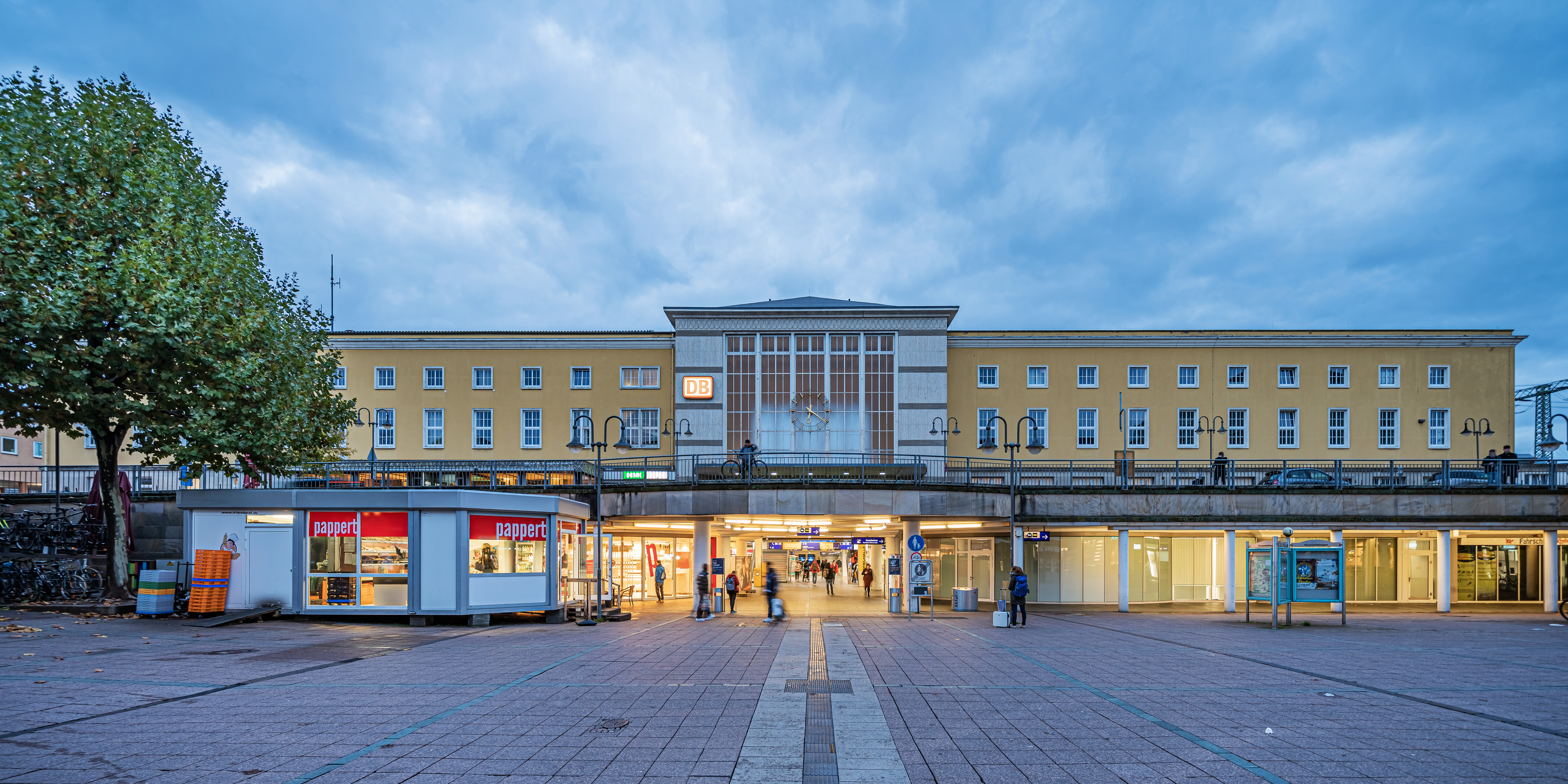
Fulda station entrance building
