= Ulfe (Sontra) =

River in Germany

Location
- Country: Germany
- State: Hesse

Physical characteristics
- Mouth
  - location: Sontra
  - coordinates: 51.1056°N 9.9654°E
- Length: 13.7 km (8.5 mi)

Basin features
- Progression: Sontra→ Wehre→ Werra→ Weser→ North Sea

Ulfe is a river of Hesse, Germany. It flows into the Sontra in Wichmannshausen.

== See also ==
- List of rivers of Hesse
