= Flieden station =

Railway station in Flieden, Germany

Flieden
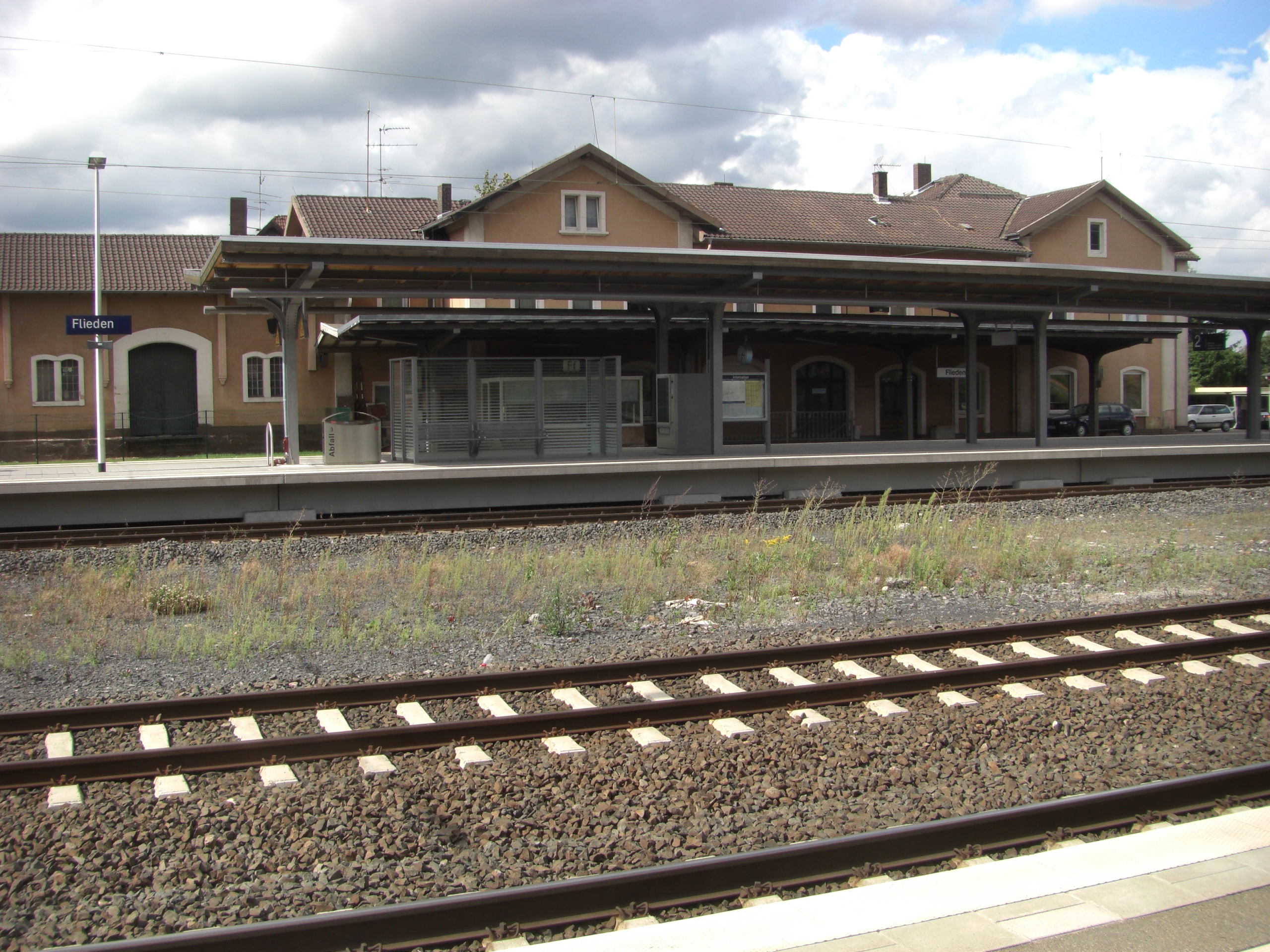
- Flieden station seen from platform 7

General information
- Location: Bahnhofsstraße 28, Flieden, Hesse; Germany
- Coordinates: 50°25′18″N 9°34′35″E
- Owner: Deutsche Bahn
- Operator: DB Netz; DB Station&Service
- Lines: Frankfurt–Göttingen (85.2 ≡ 92.2; Flieden–Gemünden (km 0.0 km)
- Platforms: 4
- Train operators: DB Regio Mitte

Construction
- Accessible: Yes

Other information
- Station code: 1812
- DS100 code: FFD
- IBNR: 8002010
- Category: 5
- Fare zone: : 1925
- Website: www.bahnhof.de

History
- Opened: 15 December 1868

Services
Preceding station	DB Regio Mitte	Following station
Schlüchtern towards Frankfurt (Main) Hbf	RE 50	Neuhof (Kr Fulda) towards Bebra
Location

Flieden station is a station in the town of Flieden in the German state of Hesse, where the Flieden–Gemünden railway branches off the Frankfurt–Göttingen railway. The station is classified by Deutsche Bahn (DB) as a category 5 station.

== History ==
Flieden station was opened on 15 December 1868 along with the Neuhof–Steinau (Straße) section of the Kinzig Valley Railway. Between the Fulda valley and the Kinzig valley is the Hessischer Landrücken ("Hessian land ridge") that the line had to cross between Flieden and Schlüchtern. At the time tunnelling techniques were not sufficiently advanced to build a tunnel of the length required for a crossing of the ridge, and a direct crossing would have required the grades on the climbs to be too steep. Therefore, a zig zag turn was built at Elm. This solution was operationally complicated: the locomotives had to run into the zig zag and an additional locomotive was required to attach to the other end of heavy freight trains to help haul them out of the zig zag over the still steep ascents. Therefore, the Flieden station also had an attached depot, for the storage and maintenance of the required locomotives.

Due to the high cost of operating the zig zag, construction began in 1909 of the Schlüchtern tunnel to Distelrasen in order to shorten the line. The new tunnel was opened on 1 May 1914. The Kinzig Valley Railway now branched in Flieden from the line to Elm opened in 1879, which became a secondary route to Gemünden. As a result, Flieden station was separated from the Kinzig Valley Railway and lost much of its operational importance.

The introduction of more powerful locomotives meant that the additional locomotives were no longer needed for trains between Gemünden and Elm and the Flieden depot was abandoned. This site is now occupied by a substation and a shed for storing vehicles for inspecting overhead line.

The station gained extensive park-and-ride facilities in the 1990s and in 2006-2007 its platforms were renewed and it gained a new underpass with barrier-free access for the disabled and a new bus station. Since then all platforms provide level access to trains except for the "home" platform (platform 1), which is not used in normal operations. The entrance building is a heritage-listed building.

== Operations ==
The line to Gemünden was served every two hours by local trains on the Fulda–Flieden–Gemünden route until the introduction of the 2006/2007 timetable on 10 December 2006. At the request of the Rhine-Main Transport Association (Rhein-Main-Verkehrsverbund, RMV) the starting point of the trains was moved from Fulda to Schlüchtern, where there are now connections to Fulda and Frankfurt. The passenger trains now run from Schlüchtern on the connecting curve on the opposite side of the Schlüchtern tunnel to Elm and Gemünden. Regionalbahn services run every two hours between Schlüchtern and Jossa; south of Jossa they run every hour. The Flieden–Gemünden line is busy with freight.

Regional-Express services operate hourly on the Frankfurt–Göttingen railway on the Fulda–Flieden–Hanau–Frankfurt route. This provides a fast connection to Fulda with a journey time of 13 minutes. Many people from Flieden commute to work in the Frankfurt Rhine-Main area, which takes about an hour.

The Frankfurt–Göttingen railway is used by about 260 passenger and freight trains per day (as of 2007) and is one of the busiest railway lines in Germany.
