= Flieden–Gemünden railway =

Railway line in Germany

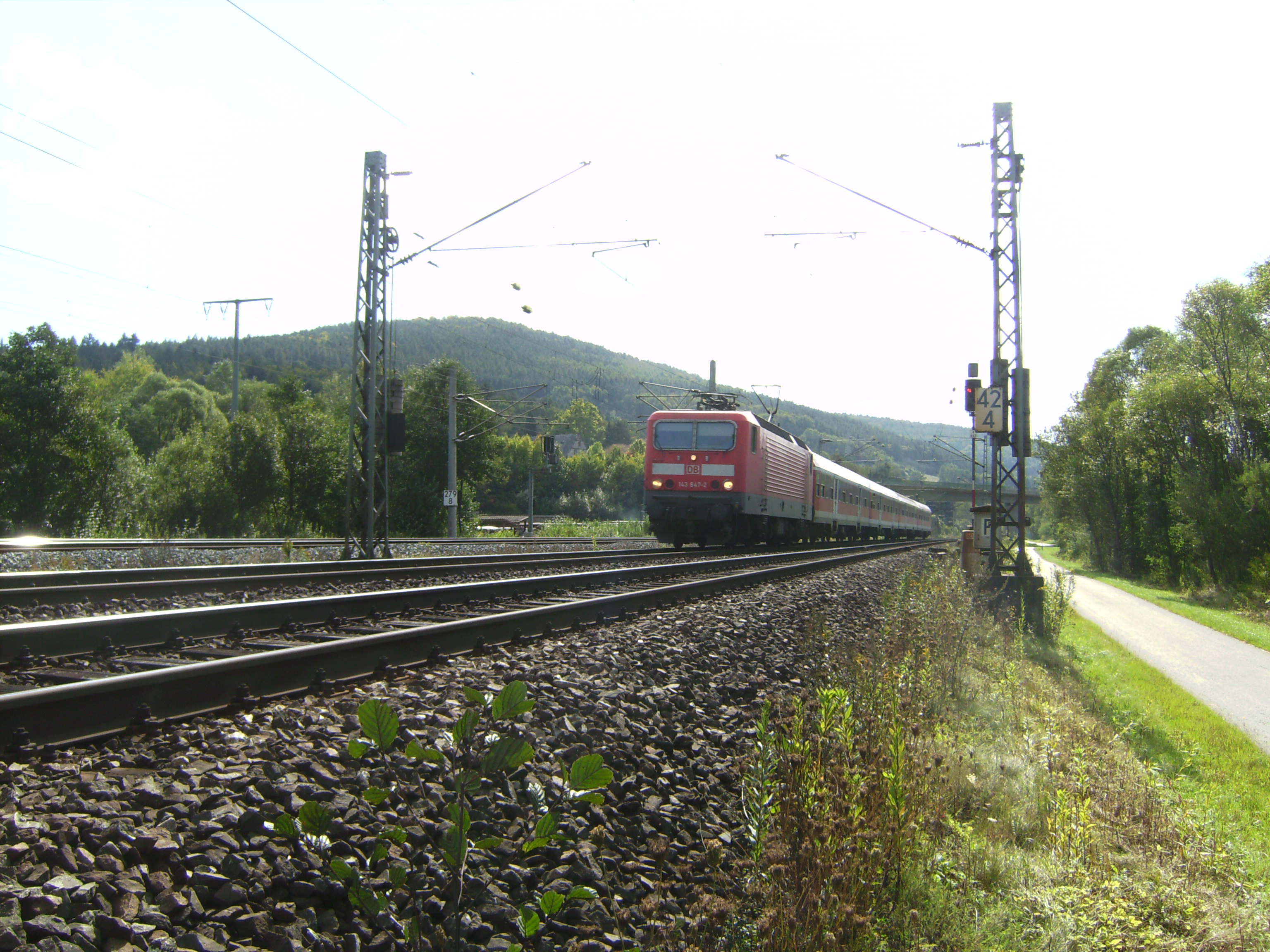
- Regional train into the Burgsinn station

Overview
- Other name(s): Fulda–Main-Bahn
- Native name: Bahnstrecke Flieden–Gemünden
- Status: Operational
- Owner: Deutsche Bahn
- Line number: 3825, 3826
- Locale: Hesse; Bavaria
- Termini: Flieden; Gemünden (Main)
- Stations: 9

Service
- Type: Heavy rail, Passenger/Freight rail Regional rail
- Route number: 801
- Operator(s): DB Bahn
- Rolling stock: Alstom Coradia (DBAG class 440)

History
- Opened: Stages between 1868–1873

Technical
- Line length: 56.3 km (35.0 mi)
- Number of tracks: Double track
- Track gauge: 1,435 mm (4 ft 8 1/2 in) standard gauge
- Electrification: 15 kV/16.7 Hz AC Overhead line
- Operating speed: 160 km/h (99 mph)
Route map
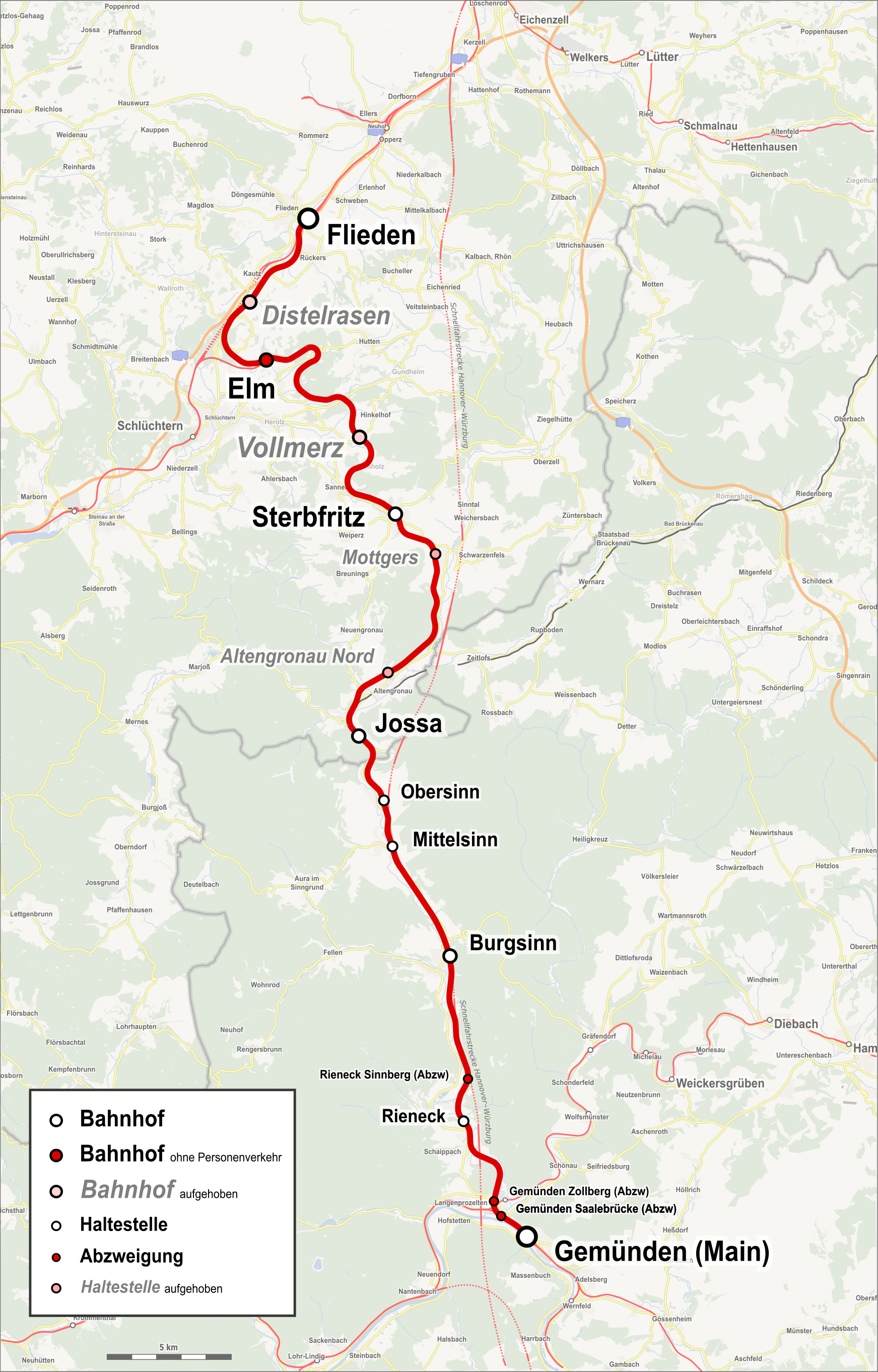
- Source: German railway atlas

The Flieden–Gemünden railway is a double track electrified railway line from Fulda, Flieden and Schlüchtern via Jossa to Gemünden am Main. The northern part of the line is in the German state of Hesse and it crosses into Bavaria south of Jossa.

== Route ==
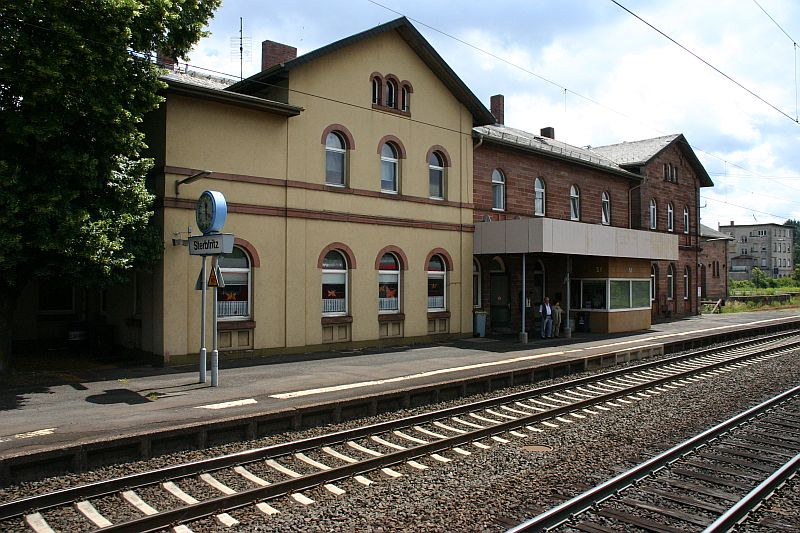
Sterbfritz station

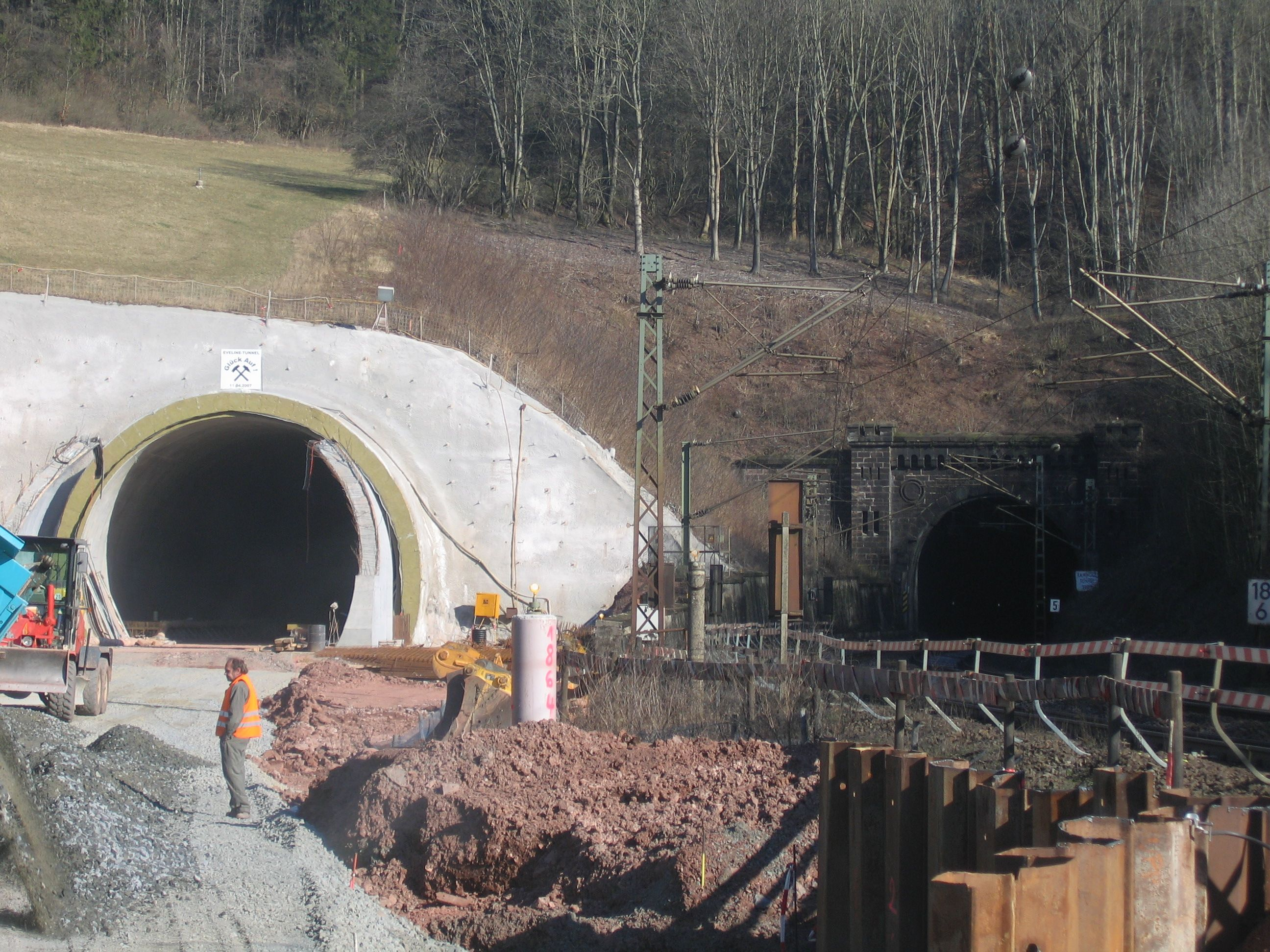
New and old Ramholz tunnel portals

The route runs from Fulda, initially on the same tracks as the line via Hanau to Frankfurt am Main, the Kinzig Valley line. At Flieden it leaves the Kinzig Valley line and runs through the Spessart and Rhön foothills through the closed stations of Elm and Vollmerz, followed by Sterbfritz station, which remains open to passengers, and the abandoned stations of Mottgers and Altengronau Nord before reaching Jossa in the Sinn Valley.

The route mostly follows the Sinn river and runs partly parallel to the Würzburg–Hannover high-speed line. There is a link to the new line south of Burgsinn through the Burgsinn depot. The old 388 metre-long Ramholz tunnel (built 1868-1871) has been replaced by a new 474 metre-long tunnel. The new tunnel was broken through in June 2007. Since 17 June 2008 trains running to the south have used the new tunnel.

== History ==
The railway line was part of the old North-South line from Hanover to Würzburg. It was opened in 1872. Prior to the opening of the Schlüchtern Tunnel in 1914 all trains between Frankfurt and Fulda on the train Kinzig Valley line had to reverse in Elm.

== Operations ==
Regionalbahn trains run between Schlüchtern and Jossa roughly every two hours and roughly hour between Jossa and Gemünden.
