= Bad Hersfeld station =

Railway station in Bad Hersfeld, Germany

Bad Hersfeld
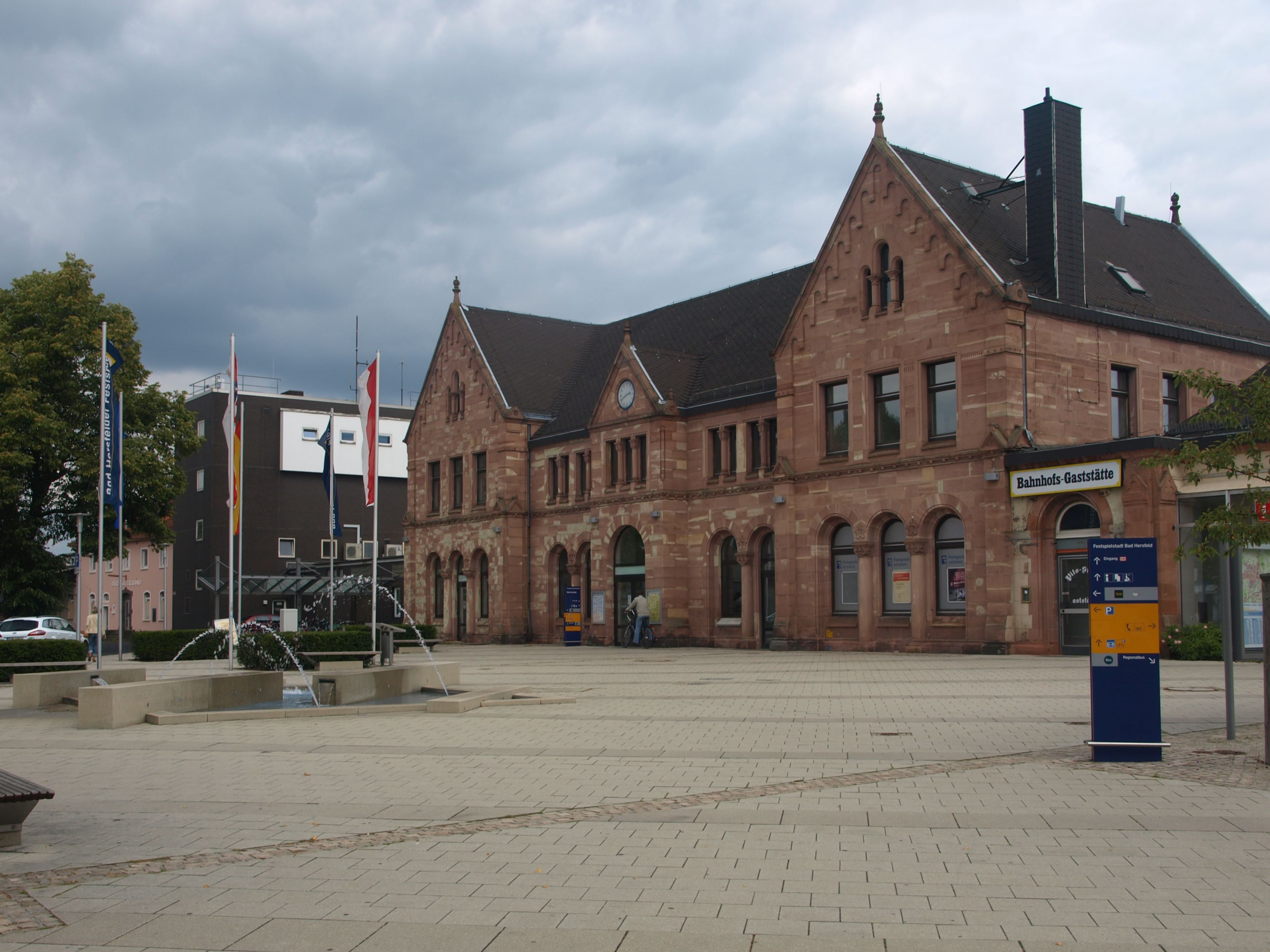
- Bad Hersfeld station and forecourt

General information
- Location: Bahnhofstr. 16, Bad Hersfeld, Hesse; Germany
- Coordinates: 50°52′12″N 9°42′57″E
- Owner: Deutsche Bahn
- Operator: DB Station&Service
- Lines: Frankfurt–Göttingen railway (km 153.2); Bad Hersfeld–Treysa railway (km 0.0); Hersfeld District Railway (km 0.0, closed)
- Platforms: 5
- Connections: Bus interchange

Construction
- Accessible: Yes
- Architect: Paul Rowald
- Architectural style: Romanesque Revival

Other information
- Station code: 282
- DS100 code: FBHF
- IBNR: 8000020
- Category: 3
- Fare zone: NVV: 2020; : 8701 (NVV transitional tariff)
- Website: www.bahnhof.de

History
- Opened: 1866/1883
Services
| Preceding station | DB Fernverkehr | Following station |
|---|---|---|
| Eisenach Hbf towards Dresden Hbf | ICE 50 | Fulda towards Wiesbaden Hbf |
| Preceding station | Cantus | Following station |
| Bebra towards Kassel Hbf | RE 5 | Terminus |
| Haunetal-Neukirchen towards Kassel Hbf | RB 5 | Ludwigsau-Friedlos towards Fulda |
Location
- Location within Hesse Location within Germany Location within Europe

Bad Hersfeld station is a through station in Bad Hersfeld in the German state of Hesse on the Frankfurt–Göttingen railway. The first station was opened in 1866 and the current station building was completed in 1883. It is classified by Deutsche Bahn as a category 3 station. It is a stop for Intercity-Express and Intercity services and is a public transport node for northern Hesse.

Since 2006, Cantus Verkehrsgesellschaft has operated regional services on the Fulda–Bad Hersfeld–Kassel route.

== Station buildings ==
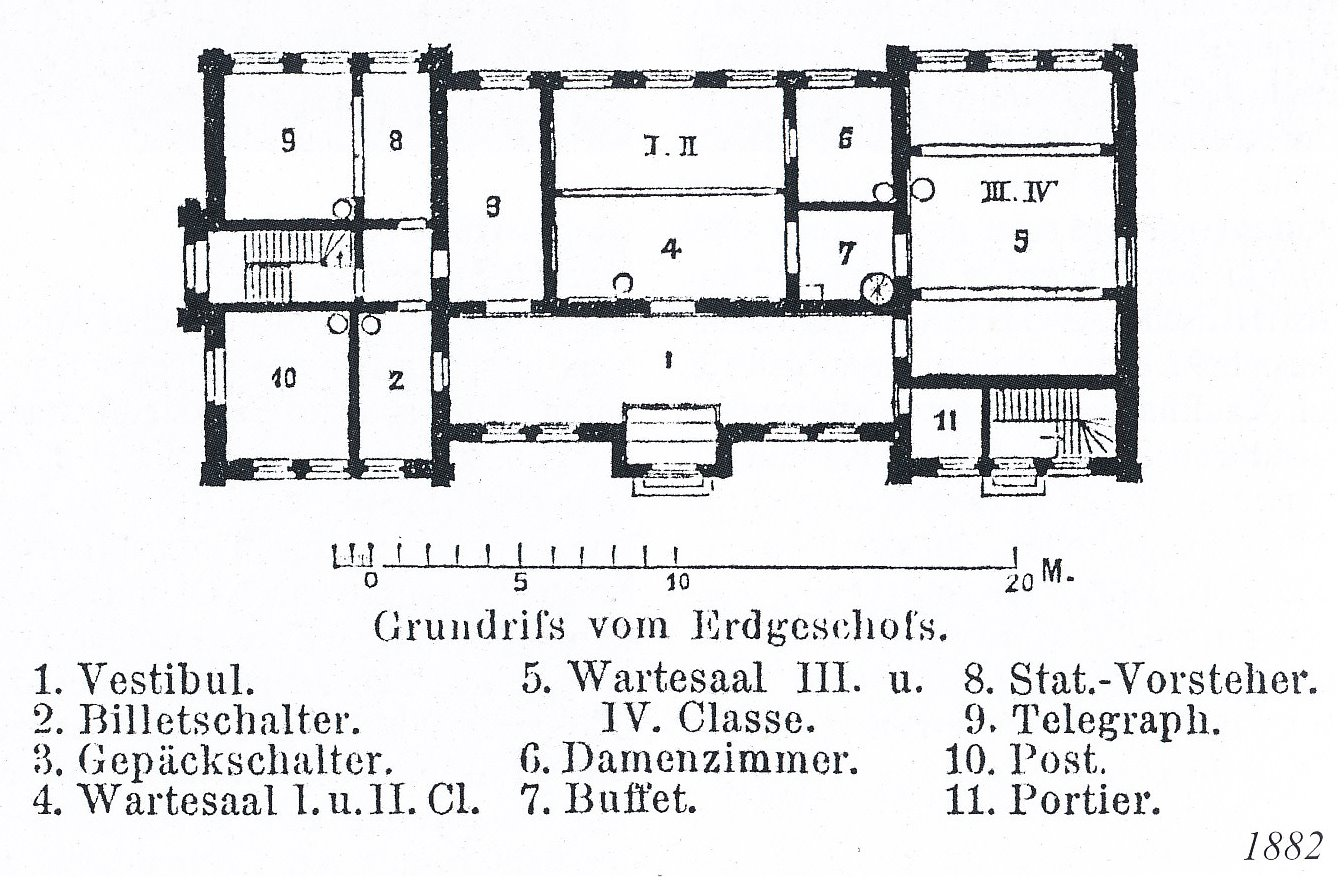
Floor plan of the station in 1882; the former vestibule, 1 + 2 class waiting room, ladies room and buffet are now a waiting room. In the former telegraph and station master's room there is now a DB Service Store

At the opening of the line between Bebra and Bad Hersfeld on 22 January 1866, a station building was built, only as a temporary measure, known as the Bude (shack). This building was later extended and still exists made of wood shingles south of the current station building. Its temporary nature was obviously a result of the Austro-Prussian War of 1866. The subsequent annexation of Hesse-Kassel by Prussia meant that the temporary station served for 17 years.

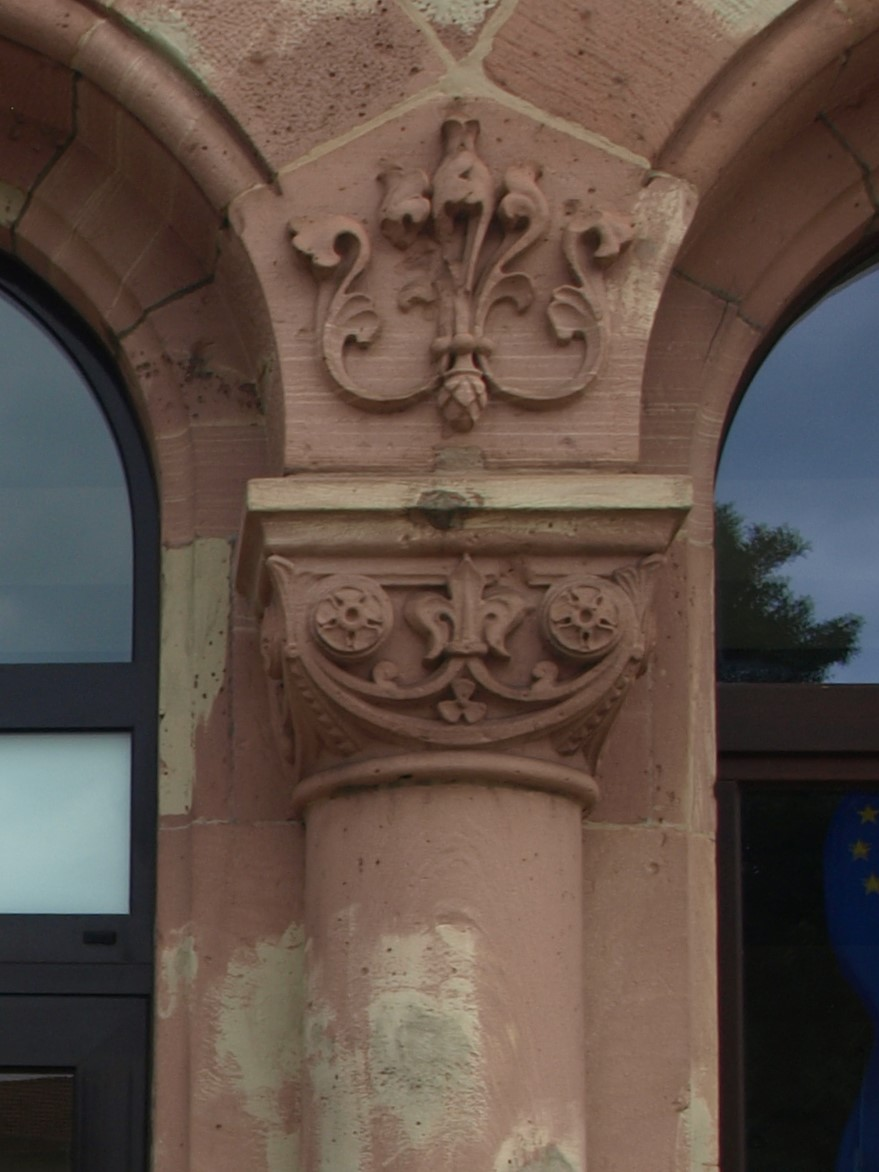
Romanesque Revival half column with capital

The current station building was opened in 1883 and was designed by the architect Paul Rowald, who worked at this time in the civil engineering office of the railway division (German: Eisenbahndirektion) of Frankfurt.

The building is a two-storey sandstone building in the Romanesque Revival style. The floors are separated by a cornice, which runs around the entire building. The sandstone for the station came from a quarry near Jossa. The station building has a rectangular central block, with a risalit at the centre of the facade on the station forecourt. This has a gable which is accented by a cornice. The station clock is installed in the gable. The risalit contains the main entrance at ground level, in the form of a circular arch, the distinguishing characteristic of Romanesque buildings. This form appears in all the ground floor windows and in the windows in the gables. On both sides of this central block are two symmetrical wings, which slightly protrude from the central block both at the front and at the rear. These have the same architectural style as the central block and have high gables.

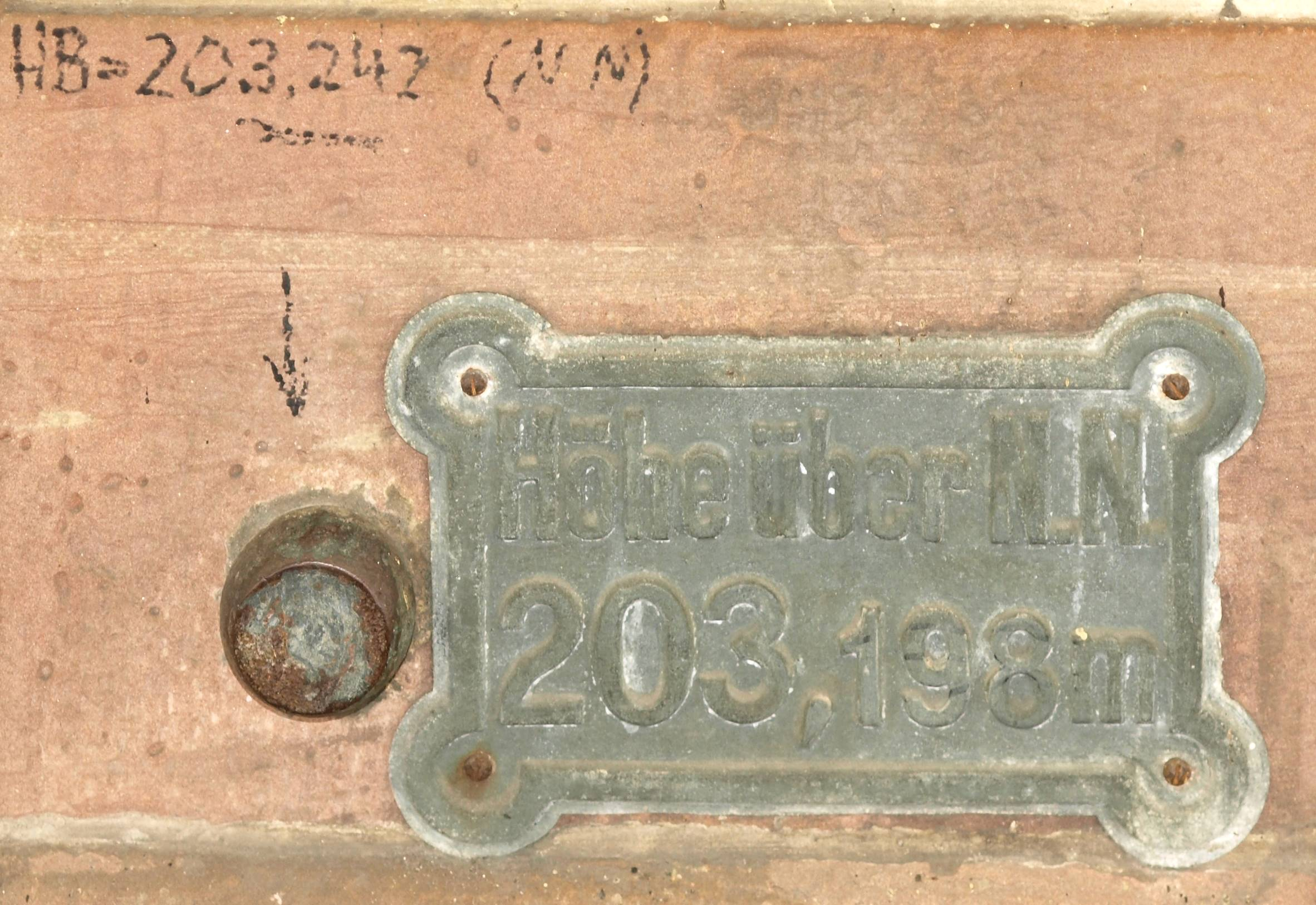
Geodetic height benchmarks from 1883

Rowald took the Romanesque style elements from the architecture of existing medieval buildings in the old town of Hersfeld, for example from the ruins of the Romanesque abbey, without copying their individual elements (Gelnhausen station, which was also designed by Rowald, has a similar design). Rowald drew heavily on the Romanesque style in the shape of the window on the ground floor, the window frames with their half-columns and capitals and the arched windows in the gables. The tops of the gable are adorned with finials; these are borrowed from Gothic architecture.

On the south side there is a one-story building that was built in 1908 that matched the style of the main building. This building was rebuilt in 1957 as a pavilion with a hipped roof. The station restaurant was located in this building until 2005.

The exterior of the station has been preserved largely unchanged, but the interior of the building has been rebuilt several times and the floor plan has been changed. This occurred most recently between 2005 and 2008. During this time, the station and the pedestrian underpass were upgraded and redesigned. In 2008, the Federation of German Architects (Bund Deutscher Architekten) gave the participating developers, the town of Bad Hersfeld, the Nordhessischer Verkehrsverbund (North Hessian Transport Association, NVV), Deutsche Bahn and the architects involved the Simon-Louis-du-Ry-Plakette architectural prize.

== Services ==
South of the station forecourt is the Bad Hersfeld bus station for regional and local bus routes. Five interurban routes are operated by ÜWAG buses. Six other interurban routes are operated by RKH. Outside the station forecourt there is also a taxi rank and short stay parking. There is a park and ride facility on the opposite side of the tracks, which is connected by an underground passage with the platforms and the station building. Platform 1 is at ground level; in 2008, the underpass to tracks 2 and 3 and the park and ride was provided with lifts to provide barrier-free access for the disabled. In the hall there is a ServicePoint and since the end of 2008 a DB Service Store.

=== Long distance and regional services ===
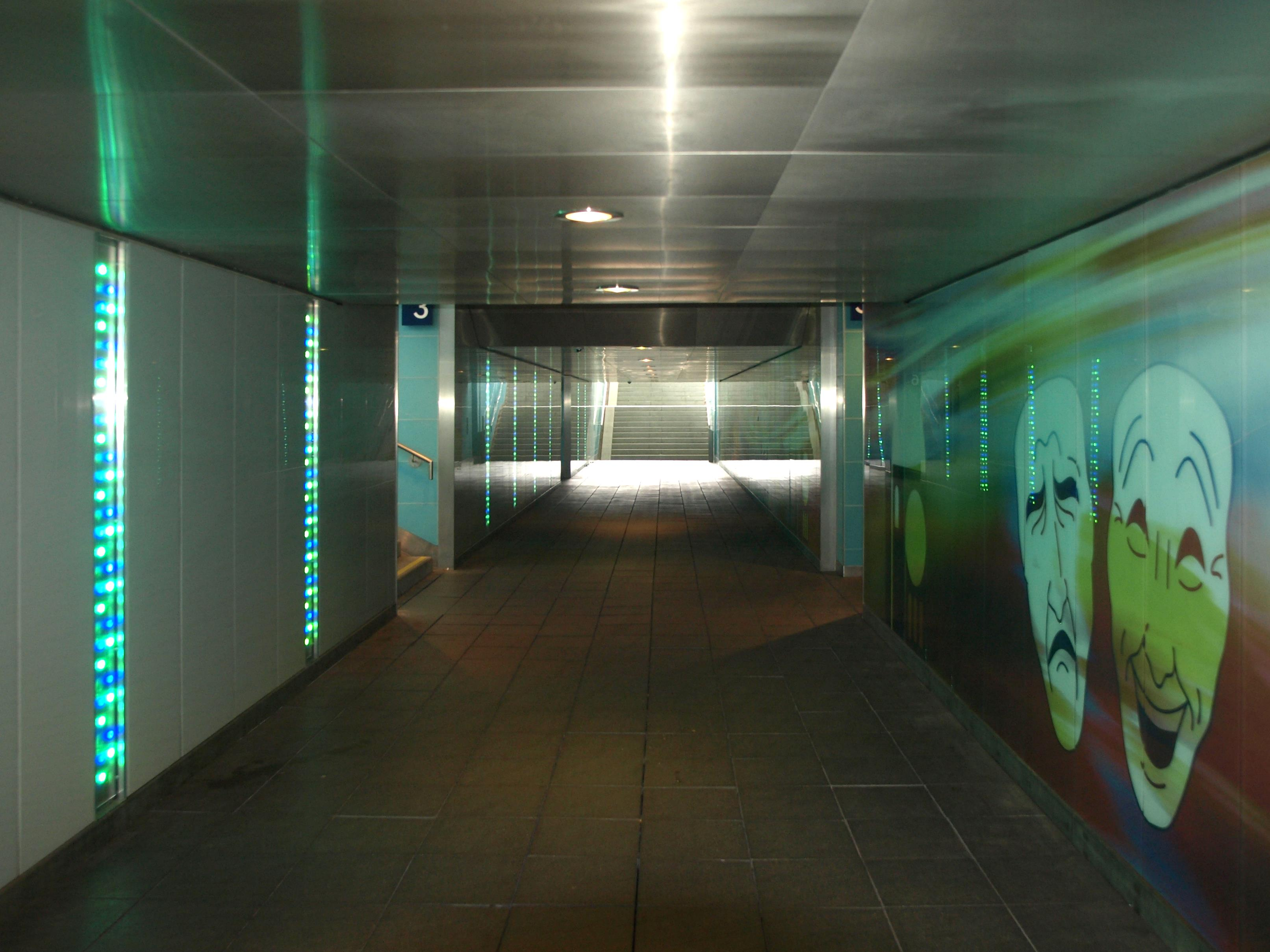
The redesigned pedestrian underpass in 2007

| Line | Route | Frequency |
|---|---|---|
| ICE 50 | Dresden – Leipzig – Erfurt – Eisenach – Bad Hersfeld – Fulda – Frankfurt – Frankfurt Airport – Wiesbaden | 120 min |
| IC 51 | Bebra – Bad Hersfeld – Hünfeld – Fulda – Hanau – Offenbach – Frankfurt | Some trains |
| RE 5 (RMV) | Bebra – Bad Hersfeld – Fulda – Hanau – Frankfurt | Some trains |
| RE 50 | Bebra – Bad Hersfeld – Fulda – Hanau – Frankfurt | Some trains |
| RE 5 | Kassel Hbf – Kassel-Wilhelmshöhe – Bebra – Bad Hersfeld | Hourly |
| RB 5 | Kassel – Bebra – Bad Hersfeld – Fulda | Hourly |
