= Schlüchtern station =

Railway station in Schlüchtern, Germany

Schlüchtern
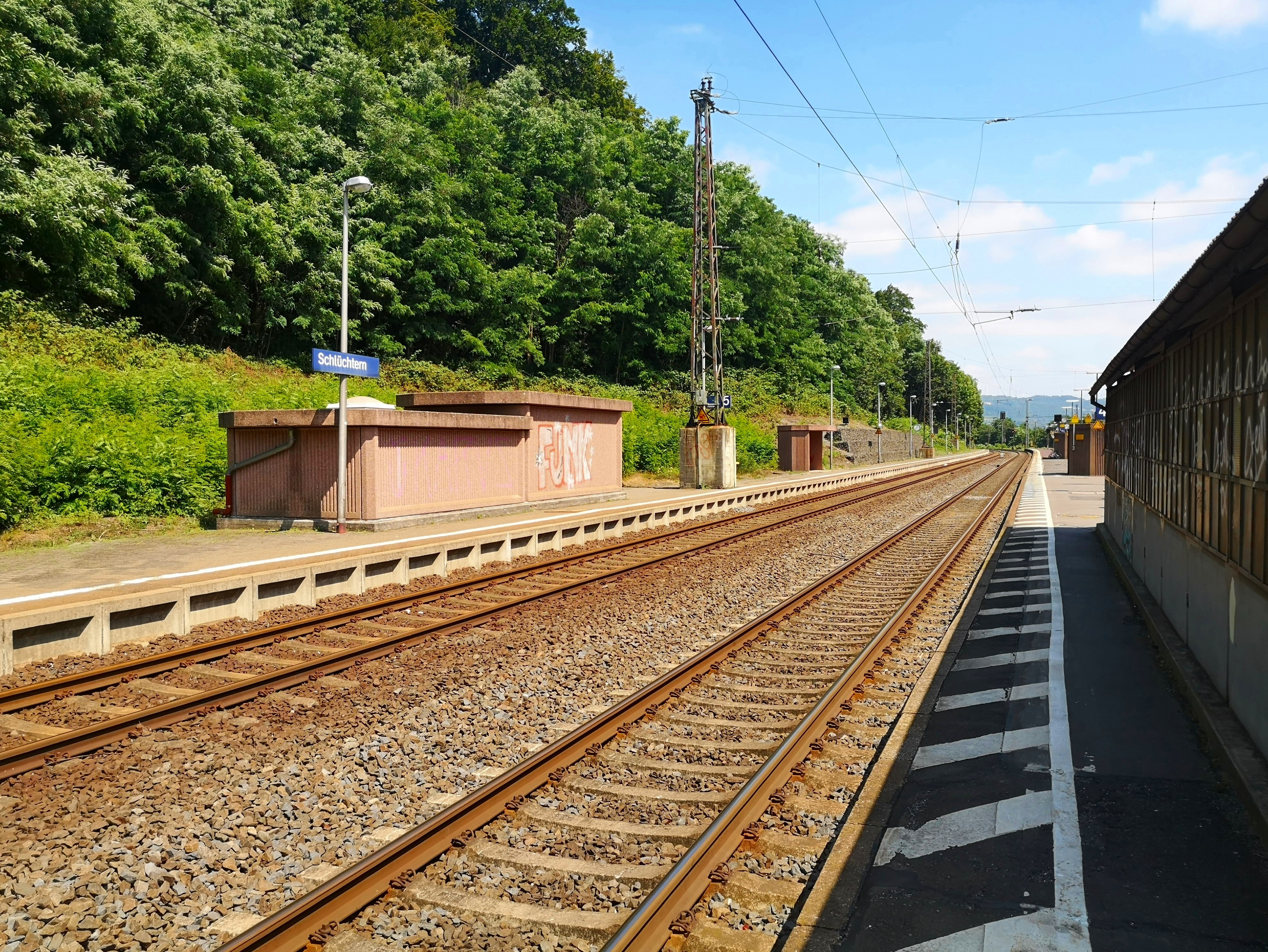
- 2019

General information
- Location: Am Bahnhof 1 Schlüchtern, Hesse; Germany
- Coordinates: 50°20′28″N 9°30′35″E
- Owner: Deutsche Bahn
- Operator: DB Netz; DB Station&Service
- Lines: Flieden–Gemünden railway (77.6 km); Frankfurt–Göttingen railway (74.4 km)
- Platforms: 4

Construction
- Accessible: No (except platform 1)

Other information
- Station code: 5601
- DS100 code: FSUE
- IBNR: 8000891
- Category: 4
- Fare zone: : 3450
- Website: www.bahnhof.de

History
- Opened: 15 December 1868

Services
Preceding station	DB Regio Mitte	Following station
Steinau (Straße) towards Frankfurt (Main) Hbf	RE 50	Flieden towards Bebra
Preceding station	DB Regio Bayern	Following station
Terminus	RB 53	Sterbfritz towards Bamberg
Location

Schlüchtern station is a station for trains. It is in the town of Schlüchtern in the German state of Hesse on the Frankfurt–Göttingen railway. The station is classified by Deutsche Bahn (DB) as a category 4 station.

== History ==
The station was opened on 15 December 1868 along with the Neuhof–Steinau (Straße) section of the Frankfurt–Bebra railway, which was established by the Landgraviate of Hesse-Kassel, the Grand Duchy of Hesse and Free City of Frankfurt, but was confiscated by the Prussian government following the War of 1866.

== Station facilities ==
=== Platforms ===
The train station has 4 platform tracks, a "home" platform (that is next to the station building), an island platform and a side platform. The home platform (platform 1) is only used by Regionalbahn services running on the Schlüchtern–Jossa–Gemünden–Würzburg route, which begin and end here. The central platform (tracks 2 and 4) is used by Regional-Express services on the Frankfurt–Fulda route. The side platform (platform 5) is rarely used. About 3 km east of the station is the beginning of the Schlüchtern tunnel through the Distelrasen ridge.

=== Entrance building ===
The stately entrance building, constructed in 1868, is now listed as a monument under the Hessian Heritage Act. It is built in various architectural styles and situated on the hillside above the town on the south side of the tracks. The two-story brick building features an H-shaped floor plan with a completely symmetrical facade. The freight shed is located uphill to the west. Additionally, the canopies over the pedestrian underpass were constructed in 1910 using steel and glass in the Art Nouveau style.

== Operations ==
Fares in Schlüchtern are set by the Rhein-Main-Verkehrsverbund (Rhine-Main Transport Association, RMV). The station is served by a Regionalbahn service every two hours and a Regional-Express service every hour. Additionally, there is a single Intercity service on the Bebra–Fulda–Frankfurt route from Mondays to Fridays, which stops at the station at 5:56. On Mondays, the service starts from Berlin-Gesundbrunnen. It stops in the opposite direction at 19:09.
