= Sontra (river) =

River in Germany

Location
- Country: Germany
- State: Hesse

Physical characteristics
- Mouth
  - location: Wehre
  - coordinates: 51.1394°N 9.9789°E
- Length: 21.4 km (13.3 mi)

Basin features
- Progression: Wehre→ Werra→ Weser→ North Sea

Sontra is a river of Hesse, Germany. It passes through the town Sontra, and flows into the Wehre in Oetmannshausen.

== See also ==
- List of rivers of Hesse
