= Hann Münden station =

Railway station in Lower Saxony, Germany

Hann Münden
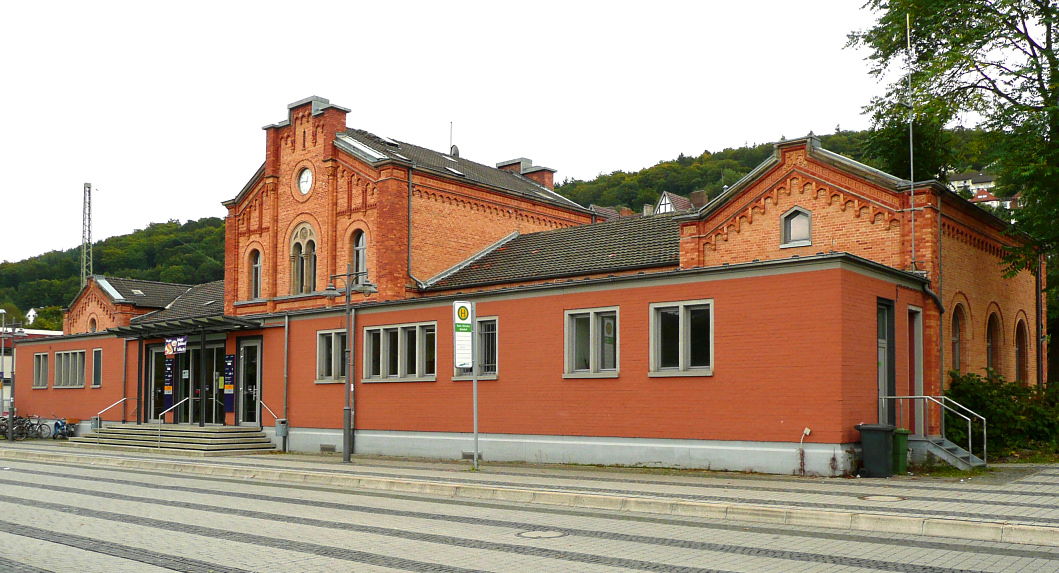
- Hann Münden station on Adam-von-Trott-zu-Solz-Platz, 2010

General information
- Location: Adam von Trott zu Solz-Platz 2, Hann. Münden, Lower Saxony; Germany
- Coordinates: 51°24′45″N 9°39′28″E
- System: Through station
- Lines: Hanover – Kassel (KBS 611); Halle – Hann Münden (KBS 611)
- Platforms: 2

Construction
- Accessible: Yes

Other information
- Station code: 2543
- DS100 code: HHML
- IBNR: 8006707
- Category: 6
- Website: www.bahnhof.de

History
- Opened: 8 May 1856

Services
Preceding station	DB Regio Südost	Following station
Kassel-Wilhelmshöhe Terminus	RE 2	Witzenhausen Nord towards Erfurt Hbf
Preceding station	Abellio Rail Mitteldeutschland	Following station
Kassel-Wilhelmshöhe Terminus	RE 9	Witzenhausen Nord towards Halle (Saale) Hbf
Preceding station	Cantus	Following station
Speele towards Kassel Hbf	RB 83	Hedemünden towards Göttingen
Location
- Location within Lower Saxony Location within Germany Location within Europe

Hann Münden station is on the Hanoverian Southern Railway and the line from Halle. The station in central Hann. Münden, Lower Saxony, Germany is connected by regional trains to the cities of Göttingen, Kassel, Halle (Saale) and Erfurt, where there are connections to the Deutsche Bahn long-distance train network.

== Facilities ==
The tracks have been significantly dismantled. In 2018, the station still had two platform tracks with an outer platform and a central through track. The old house platform (next to the station building) and the central platform between the former tracks 2 and 3 have been abandoned; remnants of the central platform are still visible. A new platform was built on the site of the former track next to the house platform. The platform is covered and access is via an underpass and a ramp. Parts of the former railway site have been built over.

== History ==
The construction of the railway for the Dransfeld ramp as part of the Hanoverian Southern Railway (Hannöversche Südbahn) began in the town of Münden in 1851. At times up to 500 men were employed on the work. They carried out the necessary earth moving, including the building of embankments, using pushcarts and earth carrying vehicles. After the Werra Viaduct in Münden was completed in 1856, passenger traffic began to run between Hanover and Münden. The station building in Münden was built in 1857 as a simple brick building typical of the time, the planning of which was influenced by the architect Conrad Wilhelm Hase. The building was built outside the town because it was not possible to route the line through the much lower town. The connection of the station to the town by a new road initiated a lot of building activity in the open area between the town and the station, which created the station district (Bahnhofsviertel). Public institutions in particular were based there and villas were built for factory owners. Numerous industrial works, which had become too cramped in the densely built-up town centre, were re-established at the station.

In 2005, the station building was completely renovated after its privatisation for €780,000.

== Services ==
The station was served by the NVV lines RE2, RE9 and RB83 in 2023:

Line	Route	Interval (min)	Operator
RE 2	Kassel-Wilhelmshöhe – Hann Münden – Eichenberg – Leinefelde – Mühlhausen – Bad Langensalza – Erfurt	120	DB Regio Südost
RE 9	Kassel-Wilhelmshöhe – Eichenberg – Leinefelde – Nordhausen – Sangerhausen – Halle – Bitterfeld	120	Abellio
RB 83	Kassel Hauptbahnhof – Hann Münden – Eichenberg – Göttingen	120	DB Regio Südost
