= Kassel-Wilhelmshöhe station =

Railway station in Kassel, Germany

Kassel-Wilhelmshöhe
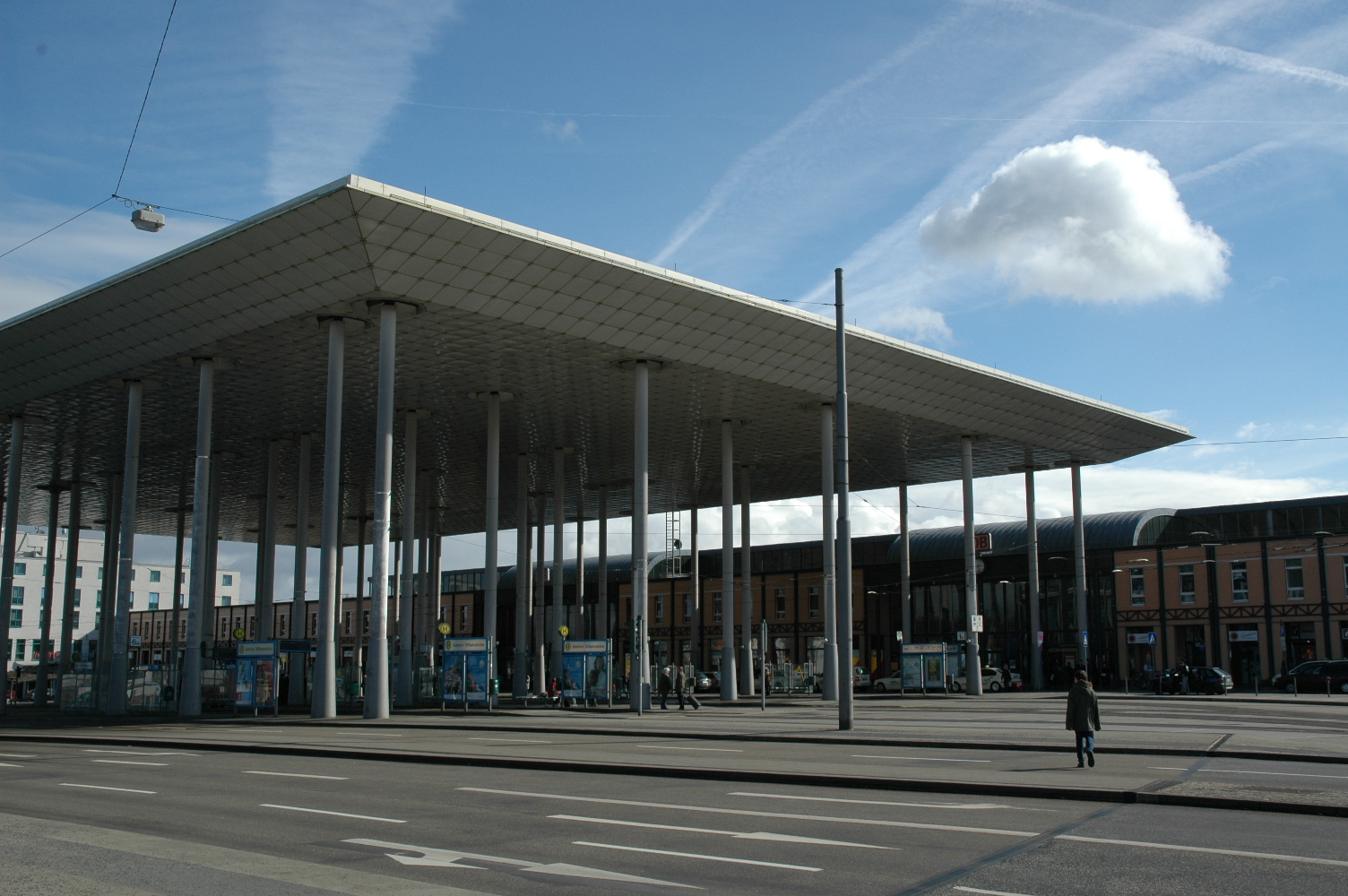
- Tram stop and station entrance

General information
- Location: Willy-Brandt-Platz 1, Bad Wilhelmshöhe, Kassel, Hesse; Germany
- Coordinates: 51°18′44″N 9°26′50″E
- Owner: Deutsche Bahn
- Operator: DB Station&Service
- Lines: Kassel–Bebra; Kassel–Frankfurt; Kassel–Warburg; Hanover–Würzburg HSL
- Platforms: 10

Construction
- Accessible: Yes

Other information
- Station code: 3127
- DS100 code: FKW
- IBNR: 8003200
- Category: 2
- Fare zone: NVV: 3000
- Website: www.bahnhof.de

History
- Opened: 1991
Services
Preceding station	DB Fernverkehr	Following station
Göttingen towards Berlin Ostbahnhof	ICE 12	Fulda towards Brig, Chur or Interlaken Ost
Göttingen towards Berlin Ostbahnhof	ICE 13	Fulda towards Frankfurt (Main) Hbf, Frankfurt Airport, Karlsruhe Hbf or Stuttgart Hbf
Göttingen One-way operation	ICE 16	Fulda towards Stuttgart Hbf
Göttingen towards Hamburg Hbf	ICE/ECE 20	Frankfurt (Main) Hbf towards Basel SBB
Göttingen towards Hamburg Hbf or Kiel Hbf	ICE 22	Frankfurt (Main) Hbf towards Stuttgart Hbf
Göttingen towards Hamburg-Altona	ICE 24	Fulda towards Innsbruck Hbf or Schwarzach-St.Veit
Göttingen towards Westerland (Sylt)	ICE 24	Wabern (Bz Kassel) towards Frankfurt (Main) Hbf
Göttingen towards Hamburg-Altona	ICE 25	Fulda towards München Hbf
Göttingen towards Bremen Hbf	ICE 26	Wabern towards Karlsruhe Hbf
Warburg towards Köln Hbf	IC 51	Eisenach Hbf towards Gera Hbf
Göttingen towards Hamburg-Altona	ICE 91	Fulda towards Wien Hbf
Preceding station	Abellio Rail Mitteldeutschland	Following station
Hann Münden towards Halle (Saale) Hbf	RE 9	Terminus
Preceding station	Cantus	Following station
Kassel Hbf Terminus	RE 5	Kassel-Oberzwehren towards Bad Hersfeld
Kassel Hbf Terminus	RB 5	Melsungen towards Fulda
Preceding station	DB Regio Mitte	Following station
Kassel Hbf Terminus	RE 30	Wabern towards Frankfurt (Main) Hbf
Preceding station	DB Regio NRW	Following station
Hofgeismar towards Hagen Hbf	RE 17	Terminus
Preceding station	DB Regio Südost	Following station
Hann Münden towards Erfurt Hbf	RE 2	Terminus
Preceding station	Hessische Landesbahn	Following station
Kassel Hbf Terminus	RE 98	Baunatal-Guntershausen towards Frankfurt (Main) Hbf
Preceding station	Kurhessenbahn	Following station
Kassel Hbf Terminus	RB 39	Kassel-Oberzwehren towards Bad Wildungen
Preceding station	National Express Germany	Following station
Hofgeismar towards Düsseldorf Hbf	RE 11 (Rhein-Hellweg-Express)	Terminus
Preceding station	Kassel RegioTram	Following station
Kassel Hbf towards Kassel Auestadion	5	Kassel-Oberzwehren towards Melsungen
Location

Kassel-Wilhelmshöhe is a railway station in the city of Kassel, in the German state of Hesse. It is the city's most important railway station, as it is connected to the Hanover–Würzburg high-speed rail line, with Intercity Express services calling at the station.

== History ==
Kassel-Wilhelmshöhe station was opened as Wahlershausen station with the last section of the Frederick William Northern Railway on 29 December 1849. Whether a station was required at this point on the line was initially controversial. Trains running between Kassel and Gerstungen stopped here as did services running on the Main-Weser Railway a little later. The station was immediately adjacent to the Wilhelmshöher Allee crossing, ensuring good road connections. The underpass originally planned under the Allee was, however, replaced by a level crossing for cost reasons. The station served not only the village of Wahlershausen, but also Schloss Wilhelmshöhe, which was two kilometres away. The station building's southern avant-corps therefore included a Fürstenzimmer ("prince's room"), a "waiting room for the nation's leaders." Julius Eugen Ruhl produced a series of designs for the station building. These had very different dimensions. A smaller version was finally built, with a two-storey brick building decorated with terracotta with five opening on each side, avant-corps and a spire, which emphasised the central axis, in the Italianate Renaissance Revival style. On the ground floor there were the waiting rooms and offices and on the first floor there were two residences for officials. The building was remodelled several times over the years and lost much of its decoration. It was finally demolished immediately before the construction of the new Kassel-Wilhelmshöhe long-distance station.

=== Structural changes in the 19th century ===
As of 1877, a steam tram ran in Wilhelmshöher Allee, originally crossing the railway at a level crossing next to Wahlershausen station. This was presumably deemed to interfere with operations so that in 1878/79 the railway was lowered by about six metres (20 ft) and a bridge was built over it carrying Wilhelmshöher Allee. The lowering of the tracks meant that the platforms and the adjacent station had to be lowered. A retaining wall was built next to the station building and a staircase was built for passengers to pass to and from trains. In addition, a pedestrian bridge was built to the platforms.

The Kassel–Waldkappel railway (also known as the Losse Valley Railway) was opened in 1879 with its own platform on the east side of Wilhelmshöhe station (today's platform 9/10).

In 1899 a third track was built for the main line.

In 1902, the narrow-gauge Hercules Railway (Herkulesbahn) was opened. It carried lignite and basalt mined in the Habichtswald to Wilhelmshöhe station, where it was transferred to the state railway. Wilhelmshöhe was also an important freight depot.

In 1904, the Kassel–Naumburg railway opened; this is now operated as a museum railway.

=== Transport connections ===
A steam tram service was opened from Königsplatz to Kassel-Wilhelmshöhe in 1877. The line was connected to the tram line to Mulang in 1900. The Hercules Railway ran to and from the Kassel-Wilhelmshöhe station from 1902. It was served by three tram lines from 1911; a fourth tram line connected later.

=== Events ===
A few days after the Battle of Sedan on 5 September 1870, the captive Emperor Napoleon III was brought in a Belgian saloon car from Cologne over the Deutz–Gießen railway to Wilhelmshöhe station and then taken to the castle, which was assigned to him as a residence. There, Empress Eugenie visited him incognito from 30 October to 1 November 1870, also arriving at Wilhelmshöhe station. On departure she travelled to Hanover. Emperor Napoleon III. on his departure travelled on 19 March 1871 via Wilhelmshöhe station to exile in England.

In 1907, Emperor Wilhelm II received his uncle, King Edward VII of the United Kingdom, at the station before a crowd of 70,000 spectators for a one-day state visit. That same year, the station was also used by King Chulalongkorn of Thailand for his visit to the Emperor.

On 14 November 1918, Field Marshal Paul von Hindenburg came to Wilhelmshöhe station. He resided at the castle hotel and there organised the demobilisation of the German Army after the end of the First World War. He departed from the station on 12 February 1919.

The last time the station was the focus of a state reception was on 21 May 1970, when Chancellor Willy Brandt received the Prime Minister of the German Democratic Republic, Willi Stoph, on a one-day visit. The political discussions were also held at the castle hotel. The guests arrived on a GDR government train.

=== Structural changes in the 20th century ===
In the 1930s, the passage under the Wilhelmshöher Allee bridge had become too narrow for the needs of the railway, which needed more tracks. But the roadway itself was too narrow for the needs of the increasing motor vehicle traffic. Therefore, in 1938 a new bridge was built, while rail and tram traffic continued, only motor vehicles were diverted. This at first resolved the traffic problems.

Deutsche Reichsbahn and the Municipality of Kassel developed plans to remodel Wilhelmshöhe station as the main station of Kassel from 1942 to 1944. The concept was not dissimilar to the project that was implemented 40 years later, but the Second World War prevented its execution.

During World War II, the station and its entrance buildings were severely damaged, but the road bridge that crosses it remained largely unscathed. However, it collapsed in 1946, when a freight train with tank cars loaded with gasoline had a hot box fire while standing there. The heat was so great that the bridge's steel beams lost their strength and the structure collapsed.

The station building, which had been severely damaged in the war was rebuilt in simplified forms and received a storage area built as an extension in the style of the 1950s.

=== Long-distance station ===
==== Options discussions ====
The planning status report of the Hanover–Würzburg high-speed railway in September 1971 provided for a station at Wilhelmshöhe. The planning status report of the preliminary route (Vortrassierung) of 1972/1973 foresaw a 6.4 kilometre-long tunnel running under Kassel. The tunnel would have run between Vellmar-Obervellmar and Kassel-Wehlheiden. Extensions to the north (Hanover) both via a direct route (via Holzminden) and via Göttingen were discussed. These two possible routes converged in Vellmar-Obervellmar (at kilometer 125 for the Holzminden option or at kilometer 144.3 for the Göttingen option). The route would have briefly run east parallel to the existing line from the southern tunnel portal and the lines would have been connected there.

As part of the planning of the new line, four options for the route through Kassel were examined from 1972: (option II is not explained in the specified source)

- option I foresaw a route via Kassel-Wilhelmshöhe station;
- option III provided for a line running continuously to the east of the city centre of Kassel, with a new station in Kassel-Bettenhausen;
- option IV would have followed part of options I from the south to Kassel-Wilhelmshöhe station and would then have run east to Kassel Hauptbahnhof. Trains would have left the urban area to the north-west after reversing in the station;
- option IVg provided for a north–south axis through Kassel, that would run underground below the city with an underground station at Kassel Hauptbahnhof.

With the large-scale profile of the new line that had originally been planned, an extraordinarily complex set of lines was considered in the different options. It was estimated that the 18 km long comparison section in Kassel would cost 1.6 to 2.5 billion Deutsche Marks (1975 prices).

==== Planning the location ====
The regional planning process for the Hessian section of the new line was initiated in a letter of 7 February 1974 and later interrupted. It was resumed in a letter dated 21 November 1975, but the district of Kassel—including the urban area of Kassel—was not included initially.

In 1977, the city of Kassel pressed strongly for the construction of an underground line through a station under the existing Kassel terminal station–including a tunnel under the city of Kassel. A new station building at the Wilhelmshöhe site and variants with different above ground and underground access lines were investigated. Deutsche Bundesbahn favoured the Wilhelmshöhe location with an above ground approach, the so-called "western route" (Westtrasse).

Both options were examined in the regional planning process, which was conducted from 1978 to 1980. Flanked by numerous reports and counter reports they were discussed amid public controversy. The underground option was—in the opinion of Deutsche Bundesbahn—much more complex, more expensive and would impose greater burdens on the population. Discussions at first focused on complex problems of urban development, but gradually shifted to noise abatement issues. On 29 March 1979, Deutsche Bundesbahn opened an exhibition on the construction project in Kassel. The "groundbreaking" ceremony for the Hessian section was held on 13 November 1981. Ultimately, the city of Kassel agreed to the station at Wilhelmshöhe after studies had shown that this site would not adversely affect the future development of the city. High cost and long construction time led to proposals for an underground through station under the main station to be discarded in favour of the peripheral station at Wilhelmshöhe.

The new station was initially designed purely as a long-distance station, which would only be used by trains running on the new line. The connection to the existing Kassel Hauptbahnhof would be carried out by shuttle trains. In the course of further planning between 1979 and 1986 it became clear that the existing Kassel Hauptbahnhof would lose its function as central rail hub to the new Wilhelmshöhe station and the Kassel Hauptbahnhof would tend to be used mainly by traffic to and from that area.

==== Architectural competition and planning of the entrance building ====
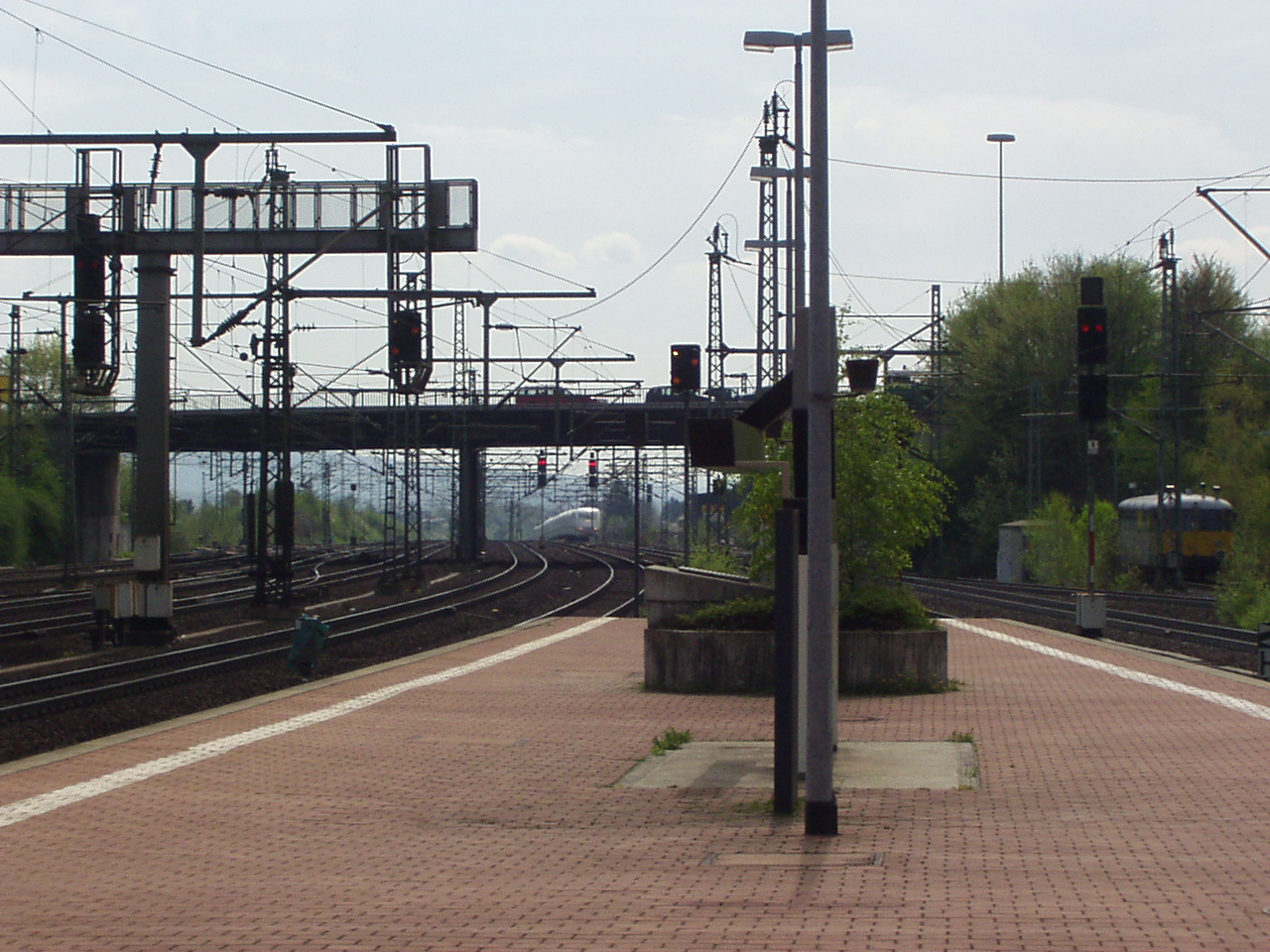
Southern end of the platform, behind an ICE departs

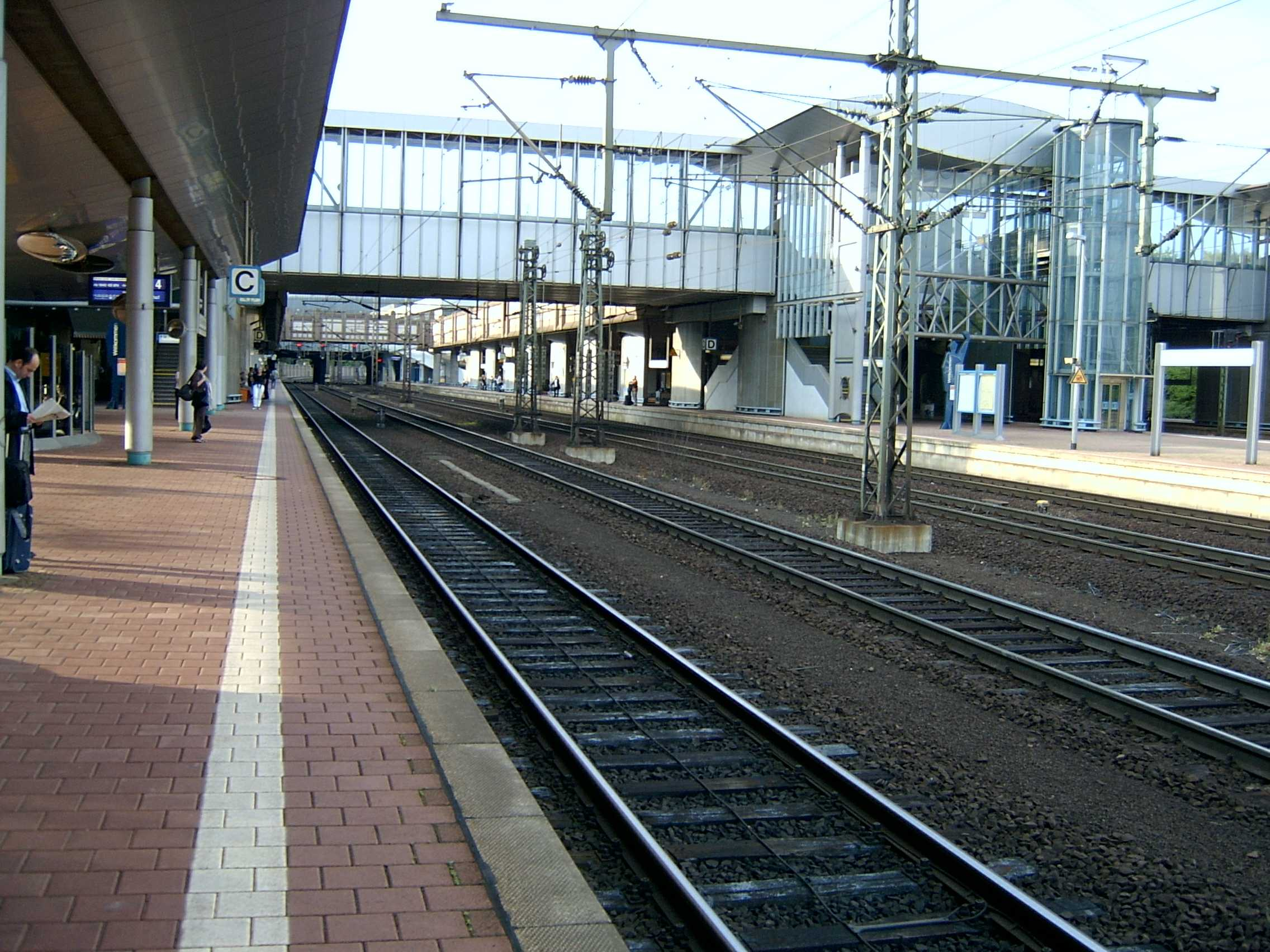
Platform in Kassel-Wilhelmshöhe

The design of the station comes an architectural competition in 1981. This was the first competition to design a station organised by Deutsche Bundesbahn in around 30 years.

The architectural competition was won in 1982 (according to another source: 1981) by the Berlin architect Andreas Brandt (Brandt & Böttcher bureau), Giovanni Signorini and Yadegar Asisi, who were also charged with its planning and execution. The architects' design contract was revoked in 1985 after the city determined that the transport connections were inadequate. During this phase, referred to as the preliminary project, the design of the building was repeatedly changed. The Dietrich, Waning, Guggenberger bureau was also contracted to design the ramp halls and the parking deck and the Schuck architectural bureau was included for the design of equipment.

On 10 September 1984, the planning decision for the area of the station was adopted (zoning section 12.5 of the new line). This decree—coinciding with that on the adjacent section 12.4—concluded the planning approval process for the 111 km long central section of the new line. Deutsche Bundesbahn arranged for the immediate implementation of the zoning section. At the beginning of March 1985, the city and Deutsche Bundesbahn agreed on the design of the station and its transport links.

Particularly controversial was the desire of Deutsche Bundesbahn for the development of long ramps to the platforms so that cars could reach the tracks. During the planning phase, the client was finally convinced of the necessity of stairs to connect to the platforms as well. The station would be fully accessible as a result of the ramp concept.

==== Construction ====
The construction of the new station under traffic required elaborate equipment at the site as it had to be rebuilt as construction progressed.

The topping out ceremony of the station canopy, which marked the completion of the structural work on the entire new line, took place on 18 January 1990.

The construction costs amounted to around 300 million marks (about €153 million). The construction costs of the new line in the Kassel node were estimated at DM 60 million per kilometre. Costs on the line between Kassel and Fulda were DM 32 million per kilometre.

==== Design ====
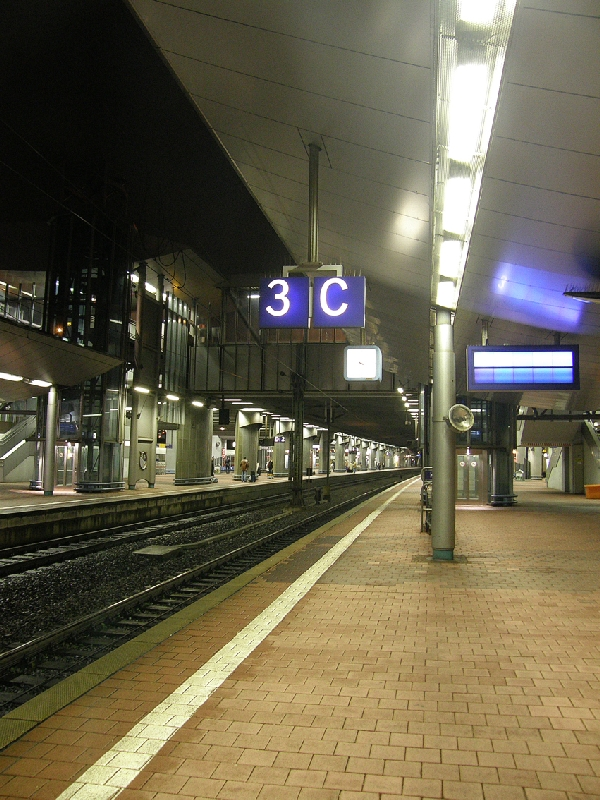
Platform on track 3 in Kassel-Wilhelmshöhe

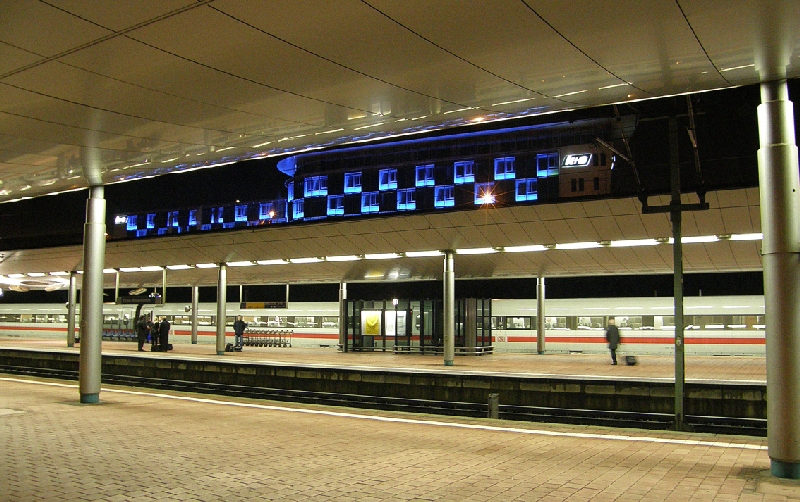
Platform in Kassel-Wilhelmshöhe

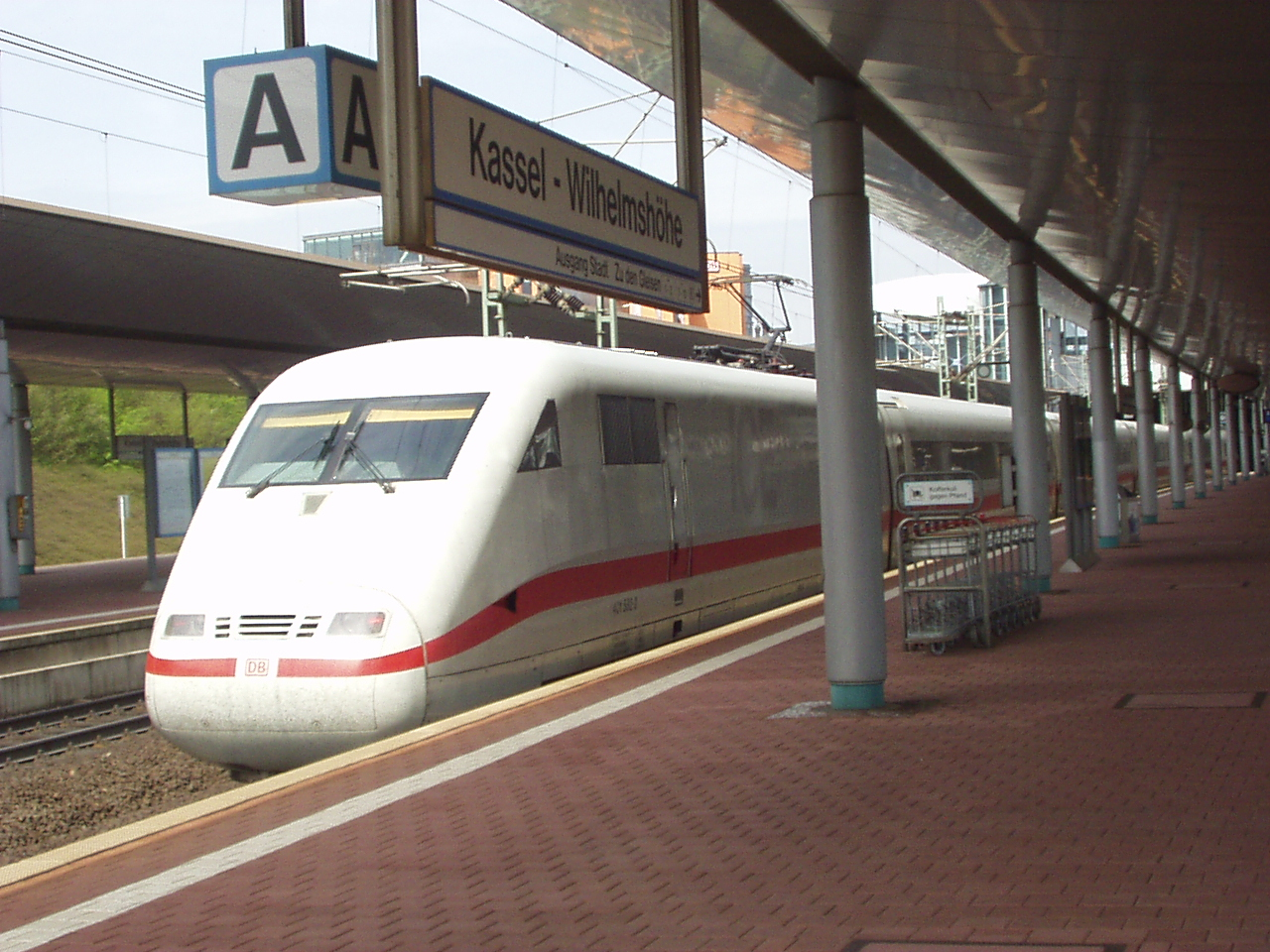
An ICE on platform track 2

Kassel-Wilhelmshöhe station is a through station with four platforms and two through tracks in a cutting. It is divided into two halves for the operation of trains. The two platforms of the west side are served by long-distance trains and the two platforms on the east side by regional trains. Two through tracks were created for the freight trains. The very wide platforms and the upper deck supported by two-sided fish-belly rows of columns make the middle of the platforms dark and drafty, leading to the station being given the nickname of the "palace of a thousand winds" (Palast der tausend Winde).

The platforms are served primarily by a 220-metre-long two-storey entrance building built over the northern approach tracks. From there the ramps and stairs lead down to the platforms. In the southern part of the platforms additional stairs and lifts connect to the platforms. This second access is aimed primarily at users of the car park, which has 300 spaces on two levels.

The station forecourt in front of the entrance building is an extension of Wilhelmshöher Allee. It is covered by a 90 m (300 ft)-long and 65 m (213 ft)-wide canopy. This rests on 59 irregularly arranged columns, 15 m (49 ft)-high over the forecourt and also projects on the axis of Wilhelmshöher Allee. This serves as the tram and bus stop.

==== Opening ====
The station was inaugurated between 29 May and 1 June 1991 as part of a comprehensive, four-day program. On the afternoon of 29 May 1991, Jürgen Kastner, president of the Bundesbahndirektion (railway division) of Frankfurt, symbolically handed the key of an Intercity Express (ICE) train that was on display to Kassel mayor Wolfram Bremeier. Numerous personnel, including several hundred police officers, secured the event. On 30 May promotional ICE services were offered to Fulda and back at special prices.

The grand opening of the new station stood in the shadow of the symbolic start of operations on the high-speed rail services in Germany on the same day (29 May). ICE services commenced on the high-speed line between Hanover and Würzburg over its full length. The fact that the ICE opening ceremony would take place in Kassel, had already been scheduled at the end of the 1980s. Five ICE trains ran to the new station from Bonn, Hamburg, Mainz, Stuttgart and Munich and reached it at the same time. German President Richard von Weizsäcker symbolically switched the exit signal to green at 12:00 noon and declared high-speed traffic in the Federal Republic of Germany open. The train driver for the first scheduled ICE service (from Hamburg on 2 June at 5:33 AM), Harry Pfaffe, was symbolically handed the key for the train. Other opening speeches were given by Federal Transport Minister Günther Krause, Deutsche Bundesbahn executive board chairman Heinz Dürr and Hesse Prime Minister Hans Eichel.

2,500 invited guests from politics and industry celebrated in the station, from which the public had been excluded. The five special trains left the station after three hours. Since the station toilets were not initially operable, long lines formed in front of two toilets in the station car park.

== Operational usage ==
In brief
Trains (daily):	600 (not including tramway)

All northbound and southbound Intercity Express services call at the station, with the exception of ICE Sprinter trains. An ICE connection also exists on the line to Erfurt and Altenbeken / Dortmund. Regional services are offered to Frankfurt Hbf, Hagen, Erfurt, Bad Hersfeld, Korbach and Kassel Hauptbahnhof where regional trains depart for Göttingen and Halle among others. In the 2026 timetable, the following services stop at the station:

=== Long distance ===
Line	Route			Interval
ICE 12	Berlin Ostbahnhof – Berlin – Wolfsburg – Braunschweig – Kassel-Wilhelmshöhe – Frankfurt – Mannheim – Karlsruhe – Freiburg – Basel – Switzerland			Every two hours
ICE 13	Berlin Ostbahnhof – Berlin – Wolfsburg – Braunschweig – Kassel-Wilhelmshöhe – Frankfurt South –	Darmstadt – Heidelberg –	Karlsruhe	Every two hours
ICE 13	Berlin Ostbahnhof – Berlin – Wolfsburg – Braunschweig – Kassel-Wilhelmshöhe – Frankfurt South –	Darmstadt – Heidelberg –	Stuttgart	Every two hours
ICE 13	Berlin Ostbahnhof – Berlin – Wolfsburg – Braunschweig – Kassel-Wilhelmshöhe – Frankfurt South –	Frankfurt Airport		Every two hours
ICE/ECE 20	Hamburg – Hanover – Kassel-Wilhelmshöhe – Frankfurt (Main) – Mannheim – Karlsruhe – Freiburg – Basel SBB			Every two hours
ICE 22	Kiel – Hamburg – Hannover – Kassel – Frankfurt – Frankfurt Airport – Mannheim (– Heidelberg) – Stuttgart			Every two hours
ICE 24	Hamburg-Altona – Hamburg – Hannover – Kassel – Fulda – Würzburg – Augsburg – Munich –		Schwarzach-St. Veit	1 train pair
ICE 24	Hamburg-Altona – Hamburg – Hannover – Kassel – Fulda – Würzburg – Augsburg – Munich –		Innsbruck	1 train pair
ICE 24	Westerland – Hamburg – Hannover – Kassel – Frankfurt			1 train pair
ICE 25	Hamburg-Altona – Hamburg – Hanover – Kassel-Wilhelmshöhe – Fulda – Würzburg – Nuremberg – Ingolstadt – Munich			Hourly
ICE 26	Bremen – Hanover – Göttingen – Kassel-Wilhelmshöhe – Gießen – Frankfurt – Heidelberg – Karlsruhe			Every four hours
ICE 41	Munich – Nuremberg – Würzburg – Fulda – Kassel-Wilhelmshöhe – Paderborn – Hamm – Dortmund – Düsseldorf (Cologne/Köln Messe/Deutz – Wiesbaden – Frankfurt)			One train pair
IC 51	(Cologne –) Düsseldorf – Essen – Dortmund – Hamm – Paderborn – Kassel-Wilhelmshöhe – Eisenach – Erfurt – Jena – Gera			Some trains

Normal times in 2015 from Kassel-Wilhelmshöhe via Intercity Express and Intercity
City	Intercity-Express	Intercity
Amsterdam	5:24	—
Basel	4:16	—
Berlin	2:49	3:14
Brussels	5:30	8:03
Frankfurt	1:24	2:03
Hamburg	2:11	2:34
Hanover	0:56	1:01
Cologne	2:36 *	3:48
Copenhagen	7:37	—
Leipzig	2:49	2:47
Munich	3:18	4:05
Paris	5:34	—
Stuttgart	2:59	4:51
Vienna	6:47	—
Zürich	5:24	7:57

* to Köln Messe/Deutz tracks 11/12; five minutes longer to Hauptbahnhof

=== Local services ===
Service	Route	Frequency	Operator
RE 2	Kassel-Wilhelmshöhe – Witzenhausen Nord – Eichenberg – Leinefelde – Erfurt	120 mins	DB Regio Südost
RB 4	Kassel-Wilhelmshöhe – Zierenberg – Wolfhagen – Volkmarsen – Bad Arolsen – Korbach	60 mins	Kurhessenbahn
RE 5	Kassel Hbf – Kassel-Wilhelmshöhe – Melsungen – Bebra – Bad Hersfeld	60 min (weekdays); 120 min (weekend)	Cantus
RB 5	Kassel Hbf – Kassel-Wilhelmshöhe – Melsungen – Bebra – Bad Hersfeld – Fulda	60 mins	Cantus
RT5	Melsungen – Kassel-Wilhelmshöhe – Kassel Hbf (low) – Rathaus/Fünffensterstraße – Auestadion	30 mins (weekdays); 60 min (Sun/holidays)	Kassel RegioTram
RE 9	Kassel-Wilhelmshöhe – Witzenhausen Nord – Eichenberg – Leinefelde – Nordhausen – Halle (Saale)	120 mins	Abellio
RE 11 (Rhein-Hellweg-Express)	Kassel-Wilhelmshöhe – Warburg (Westf) – Altenbeken – Paderborn Hbf – Hamm – Dortmund Hbf – Bochum Hbf – Essen Hbf – Duisburg Hbf – Düsseldorf Hbf	120 mins	National Express
RE 17 (Sauerland-Express)	Kassel-Wilhelmshöhe – Hofgeismar – Warburg (Westf) – Brilon Wald – Hagen	120 mins	DB Regio NRW
RE 30	Kassel Hbf – Kassel-Wilhelmshöhe – Wabern – Treysa – Marburg – Gießen – Frankfurt (Main)	120 mins	DB Regio Mitte
RB 38	Kassel Hbf – Kassel-Wilhelmshöhe – Wabern – Treysa	Some trains in peak	Kurhessenbahn
RE 39 / RB 39	Kassel Hbf – Kassel-Wilhelmshöhe – Wabern – Bad Wildungen	60 min (weekdays); 120 min (weekend)	Kurhessenbahn
RE 98 (Main-Sieg-Express)	Kassel Hbf – Kassel-Wilhelmshöhe – Wabern – Treysa – Marburg – Gießen – Frankfurt (Main)	120 mins	HLB

The station is also served by trams and two lines of the RegioTram system, the light rail system of Kassel. These two lines terminate at Treysa or Melsungen respectively.

== See also ==
- Rail transport in Germany
