= Cantus Verkehrsgesellschaft =

German transport company

- Company type: GmbH
- Industry: Transport
- Founded: 2005
- Headquarters: Kassel, Hesse, Germany
- Key people: Veit Salzmann; Andreas Ortz
- Products: transport
- Owner: Hessische Landesbahn (50%); BeNEX (50%)
- Number of employees: 85
- Website: www.cantus-bahn.de

Cantus Verkehrsgesellschaft mbH (which translates roughly as Cantus Transport Company Ltd), based in Kassel is a joint subsidiary of Hessische Landesbahn (HLB) and Hamburger Hochbahn (HHA). The word cantus refers to a steel rail-wheel tyre and is written in all lower case in the company's style. The company took over local rail passenger services on four routes in December 2006 for ten years. After the re-tendering of the unchanged Northeast Hesse network on 15 June 2013 for 15 years from 11 December 2016, cantus was again awarded the contract on 24 March 2014. Since then, annual traffic of 3.9 million train kilometres with 21 Stadler FLIRT electric multiple units has been operated.

- RE 5 Kassel – Melsungen – Bebra – Bad Hersfeld
- RB 5 Kassel – Melsungen – Bebra – Bad Hersfeld – Fulda
- RB 6 Bebra – Herleshausen – Eisenach
- RB 83 Göttingen – Eichenberg – Hann. Münden – Kassel
- RB 87 Göttingen – Eichenberg – Eschwege – Bebra

Lines RB83 and RB87 are coupled between Göttingen and Eichenberg.

Line RB83 was designated as R1 until 2015.

Twenty 3-car and 4-car Stadler FLIRT EMUs were ordered and are used on all four lines. The 3-car vehicles can carry 343 (167 seated), and the four-car vehicles 457 (219 seated). Three-car units are designated 427 (centre section: 827) and four-car units 428/828).

The vehicles were tested in November 2006 to test travels on the Friedberg-Hanau line of the HLB as well as the KBS 209.60 (operated by ODEG railway in which the HHA is involved). The HHA is also active in Hessen in the city bus services of Wiesbaden (WiBus) and Fulda (Fulda bus). In addition, Cantus took part in the Bavarian subnetwork around Würzburg, which reaches Schlüchtern in a branch south of Fulda but was subject to a competition procedure from DB Regio AG.

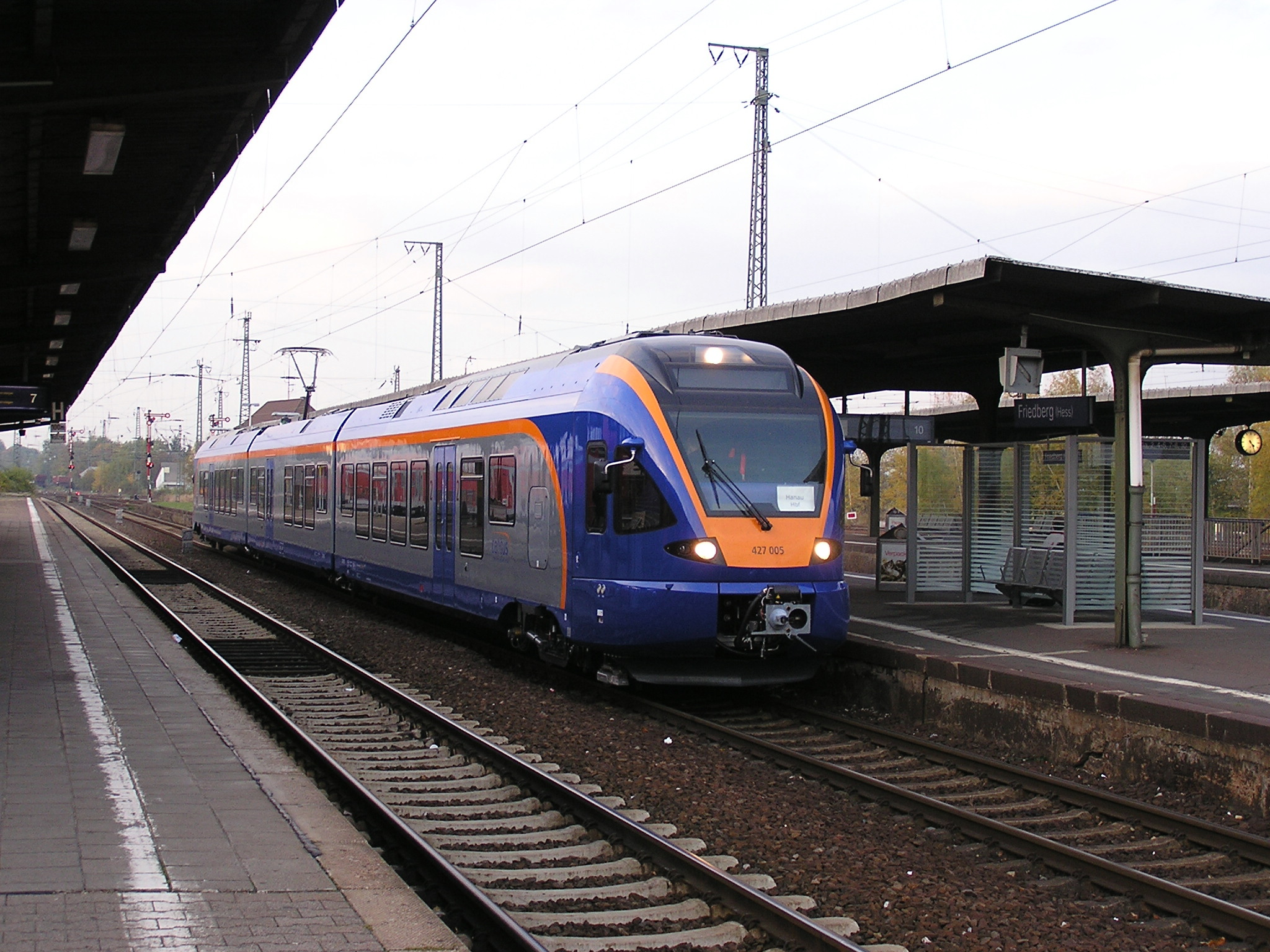
A Class 427 FLIRT-Train on a test drive in Friedberg station

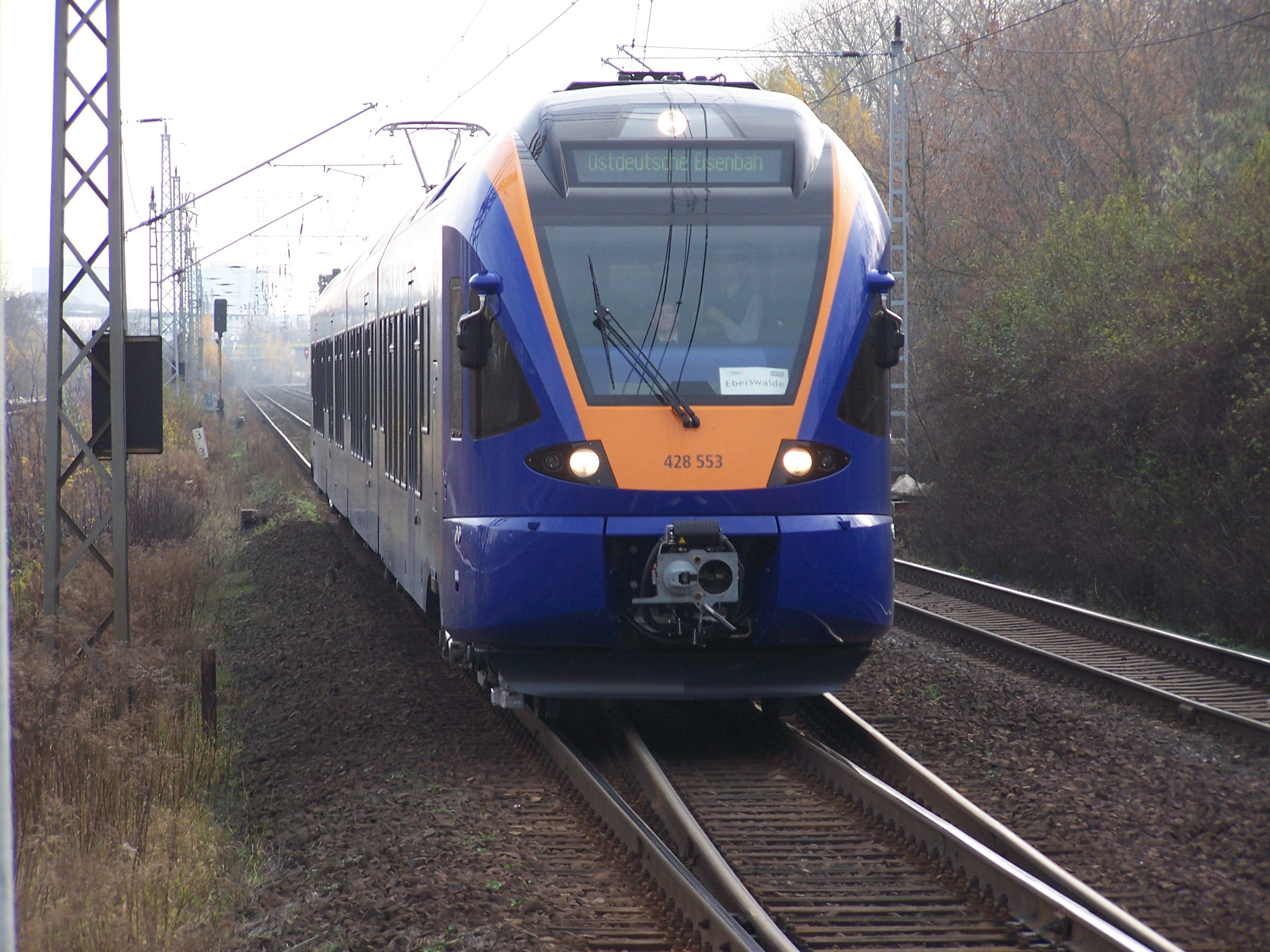
A Class 427 FLIRT unit on a test drive

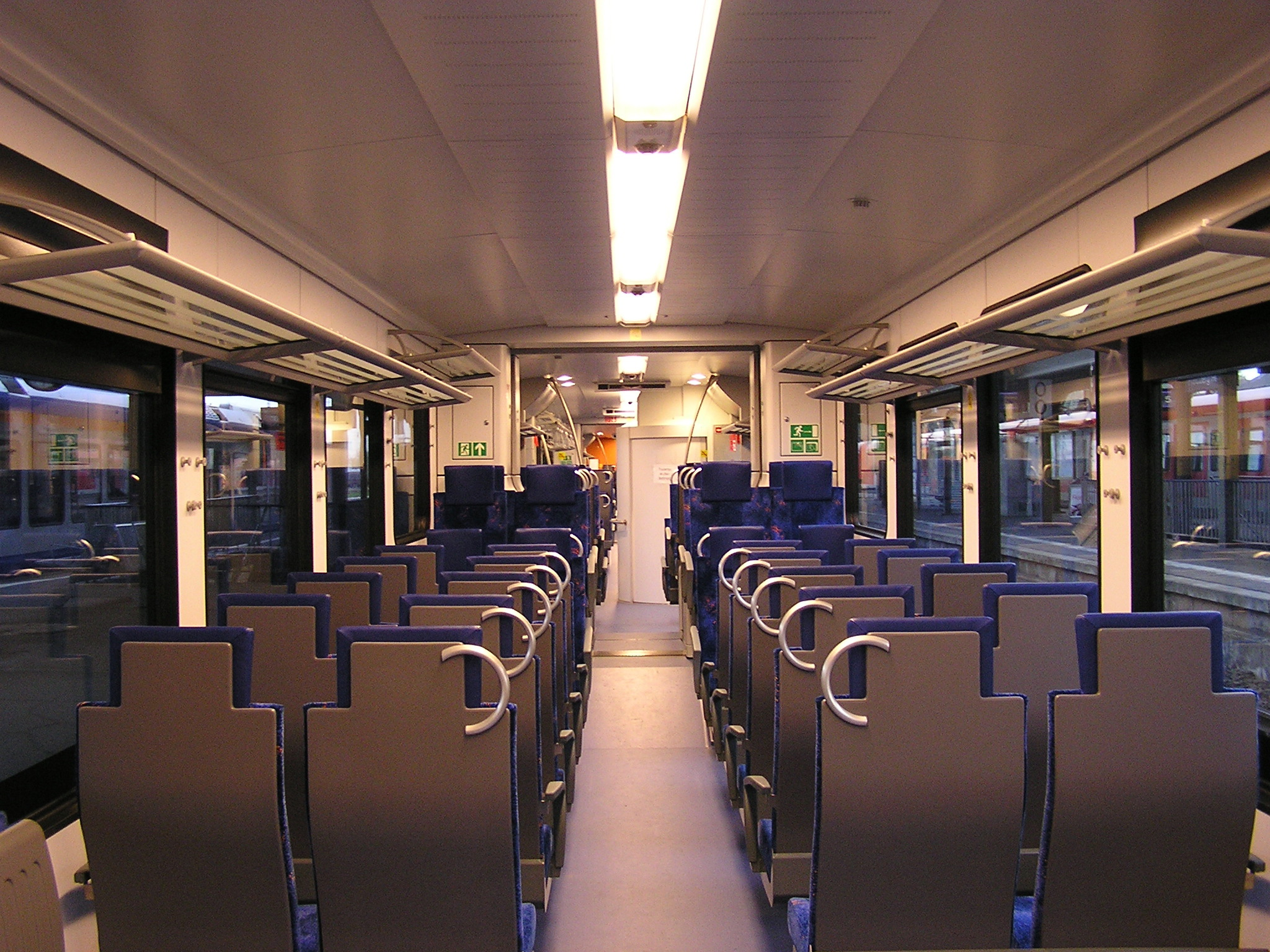
Interior of a FLIRT-Train

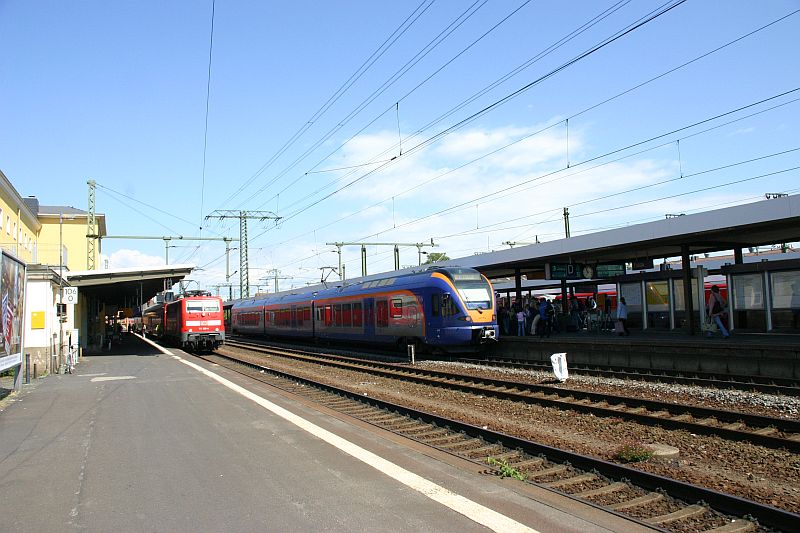
A FLIRT in Fulda station

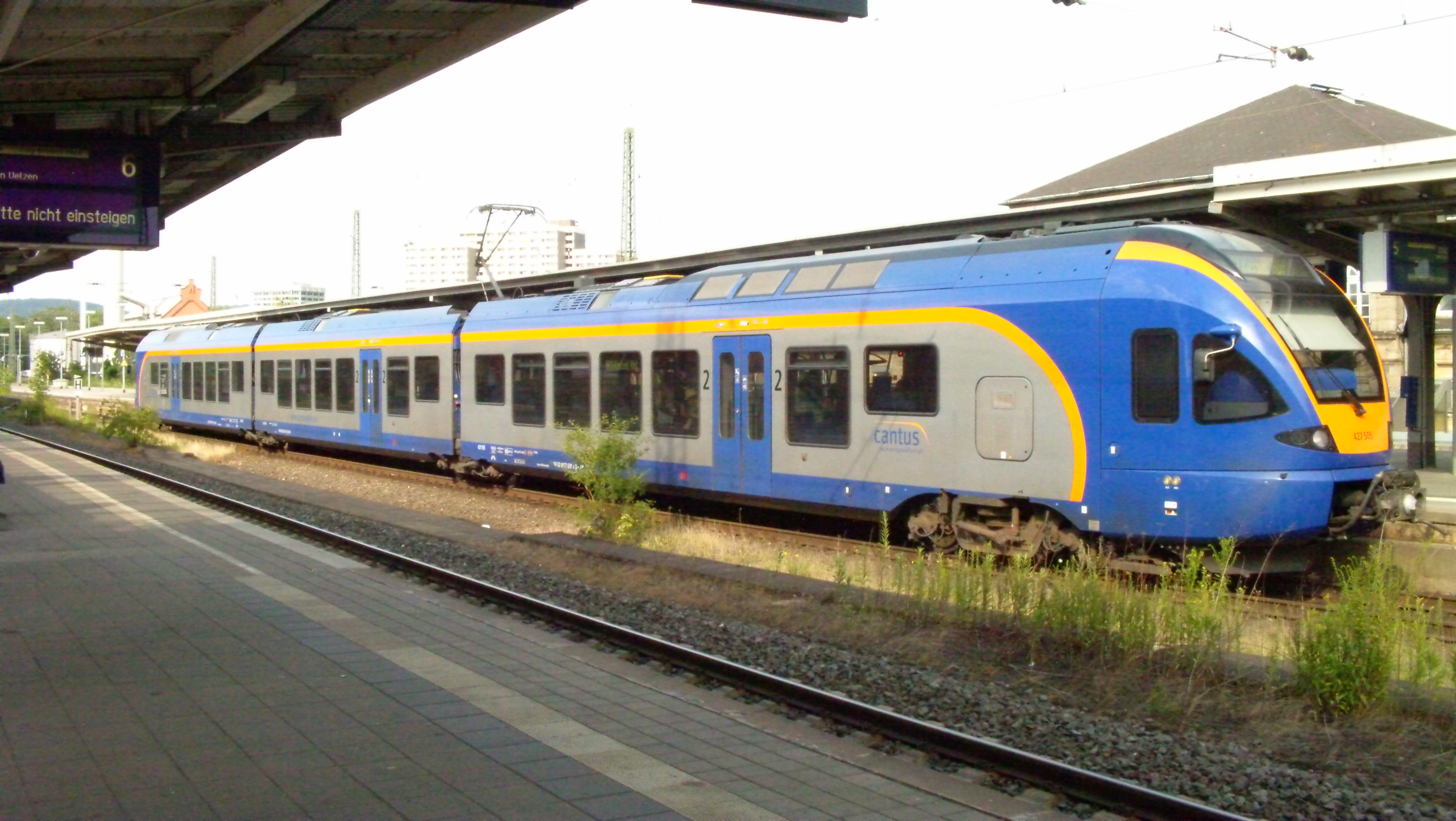
A Class 427 FLIRT unit in Göttingen station

== Network ==
Line	Route	Railway line
RE 5	Kassel Hauptbahnhof – Melsungen – Bebra – Bad Hersfeld	Bebra–Baunatal-Guntershausen railway Frankfurt–Göttingen railway
RB 5	Kassel Hauptbahnhof – Melsungen – Bebra – Bad Hersfeld – Fulda	Bebra–Baunatal-Guntershausen railway Frankfurt–Göttingen railway
RB 6	Bebra – Herleshausen – Eisenach	Halle–Bebra railway
RB 83	Göttingen – Eichenberg – Hann. Munden – Kassel	Frankfurt–Göttingen railway Halle–Hann. Münden railway Hanoverian Southern Railway
RB 87	Göttingen – Eichenberg – Eschwege – Bebra	Göttingen–Bebra railway
