= Eichenberg station =

Railway station in Neu-Eichenberg, Germany

Eichenberg
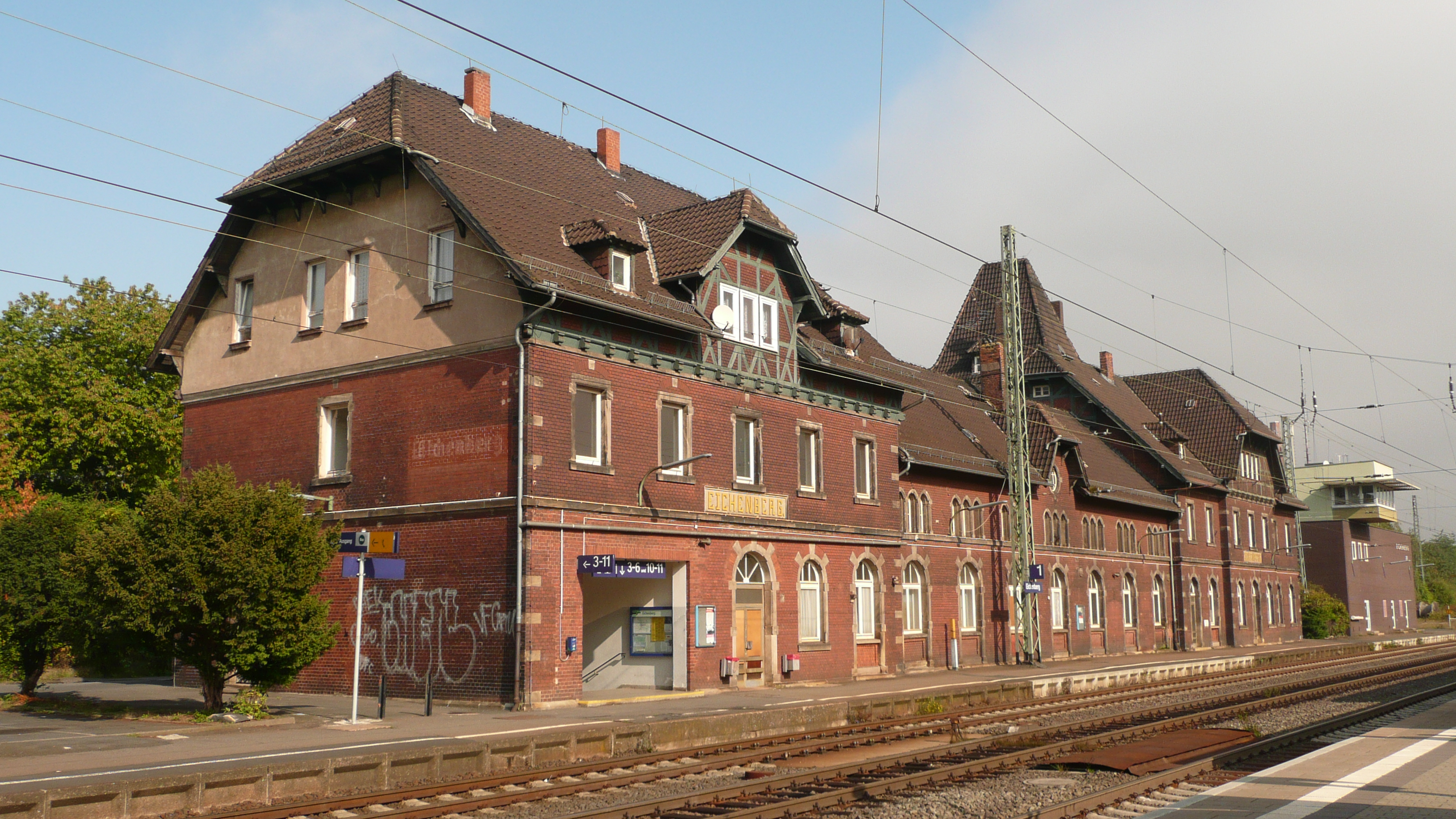

General information
- Location: Neu-Eichenberg, Hesse; Germany
- Coordinates: 51°22′31″N 9°55′17″E
- Owner: DB Netz
- Operator: DB Station&Service
- Lines: Bebra–Göttingen (km 227.3); Halle–Kassel (km 170.5); Velmeden–Eichenberg (km 25.0) (stillgelegt)
- Platforms: 7

Construction
- Accessible: No (except platform 1)

Other information
- Station code: 1499
- DS100 code: HEBG
- IBNR: 8000090
- Category: 4
- Fare zone: NVV: 6090; VSN: 640 (NVV transitional tariff)
- Website: www.bahnhof.de

History
- Opened: 1869

Services
Preceding station	Abellio Rail Mitteldeutschland	Following station
Witzenhausen Nord towards Kassel-Wilhelmshöhe	RE 9	Heilbad Heiligenstadt towards Halle (Saale) Hbf
Preceding station	Cantus	Following station
Friedland towards Bebra	RB 87	Bad Sooden-Allendorf towards Göttingen
Witzenhausen Nord towards Kassel Hbf	RB 83	Friedland towards Göttingen
Preceding station	DB Regio Südost	Following station
Witzenhausen Nord towards Kassel-Wilhelmshöhe	RE 2	Arenshausen towards Erfurt Hbf
Location
- Location within Hesse Location within Germany Location within Europe

Eichenberg station is the only station in the municipality of Neu-Eichenberg in the German state of Hesse. It is located in the hamlet of Eichenberg-Bahnhof, which lies east of and on the other side of federal highway B 27 to the historic village of Eichenberg.

== History ==
Eichenberg station originated with the opening of the Arenshausen–Hann. Münden section of the Halle–Kassel line in 1869.

In 1876, the Niederhone–Eichenberg–Friedland section of the Bebra–Göttingen railway was completed. Thus Eichenberg became a railway junction. Substantial inclines had to be overcome on the Eichenberg side of the watershed between the Fulda and the Werra rivers at Cornberg and between the Werra and the Leine, requiring four tunnels and very curvy track.

On 15 December 1915, the 25 km long Gelster Valley Railway was opened from Velmeden via Großalmerode Ost to Eichenberg. In freight transport, it primarily served the transport of lignite from the northern Hessian coal mining area.

After the end of World War II, Eichenberg was a border station. Here there were controls between the British and American zone until 1 November 1948, when they were abolished to the north (in the British zone); a year later, they were also abolished to the south (in the U.S. zone). Rail services between Eichenberg and Arenshausen (in the Russian zone) were closed. A re-opening of the line was rejected by the western authorities because Eichenberg station was congested due to the controls. Under the Helmstedt agreement of 1949, the line would have been re-opened, but this was not implemented. The tracks between Eichenberg and Arenshausen were dismantled from 1948.

On 2 June 1973, passenger services were closed on the Gelster Valley Railway. The remaining freight traffic from Eichenberg to the paper mill at Witzenhausen Süd was abandoned on 31 December 2001.

In 1989, the Eichenberg–Arenshausen line became one of the first lines to be selected for reopening over the Inner German border. On 6 January 1990, the first survey work was carried out. In Eichenberg the unused eastern platform (tracks 10 and 11) was completely renovated and extended and access to the underpass was restored. Also, a chord was built to avoid a level crossing of the north-south line and the east-west traffic on the line to Kassel. The new platform was put into operation on 26 May 1990.

Trains on the Nordhausen–Göttingen route formerly had to reverse in Eichenberg, so the Eichenberg curve was rebuilt as a connecting curve at the northern end of the station and put into operation in 1998, relieving congestion at the station.

== Platforms ==
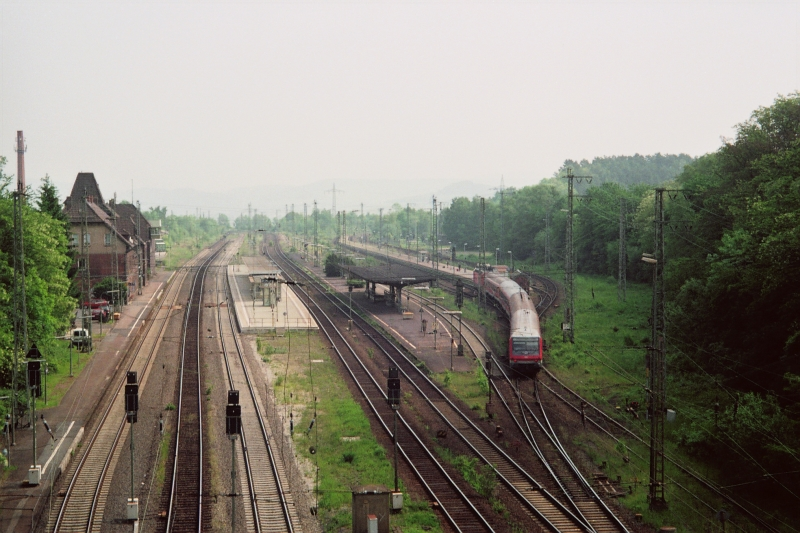
Tracks of Eichenberg station

Eichenberg station has extensive trackage today. The passenger traffic is handled at seven platform tracks.

The numbering starts on the north-west side, next to the station building.

- Track 1 is a through track and is in front of the station building. The track is no longer used for scheduled passenger services except for individual services to Kassel in the evenings.
- Track 2 is a through track without a platform and is used by freight and long-distance passenger traffic as a through track.
- Track 3 shares an island platform with track 4. Today, it is used by Cantus R1 services towards Kassel and R7 services towards Eschwege, Bebra and Fulda.
- Track 4 is a through track and is located on the island platform next to track 3. Today, it is used by Cantus trains to Göttingen.
- Track 5 is a through track and shares an island platform with track 6. Currently (as of the end of October 2012), this platform is to be modernised and therefore currently no trains operate from this platform.
- Track 6 is another through track and is located on the platform next to track 5. It is also closed for modernisation.
- Track 7 is a through track without a platform, which is, however, now mostly overgrown with bushes and small trees.
- Track 8, like track 7, is an overgrown track without a platform.
- Track 9, like tracks 7 and 8, has no platform and is now mostly overgrown with bushes and small trees.
- Platform 10 is a through track and shares the outermost island platform with 11 track. It is used by services towards Halle or Erfurt via Leinefelde and Nordhausen or to Kassel-Wilhelmshöhe.
- Track 11 is another passage track and shares an island platform with track 10. It is used by some regional services towards Nordhausen, which begin or end in Eichenberg.
- Track 12 is a through track without a platform and is used by freight trains and long-distance passenger traffic towards Leinefelde or Nordhausen.
- A track that is no longer used regularly branches from track 12.
- The platform which served the trains of the Gelster Valley Railway was, until the reconstruction of the station in 1990, between tracks 12 and 13.

The platforms of Eichenberg station are not barrier-free as they can only be reached by stairs from the pedestrian underpass.

== Rail services ==
Eichenberg is part of the Nordhessischer Verkehrsverbund (North Hesse Transport Association, NVV).

Eichenberg station is at the junction of the old North–South railway (Bebra–Göttingen railway) and the Halle–Kassel railway. There are direct connections to Witzenhausen, Hann. Munden, Kassel, Göttingen, Leinefelde, Nordhausen, Halle, Mühlhausen, Erfurt, Eschwege, Bebra, with some running to Bad Hersfeld and Fulda. These run as one Regional-Express and four Regionalbahn services operated by Deutsche Bahn, Cantus Verkehrsgesellschaft and Erfurter Bahn.

== Future ==
Eichenberger station is not accessible by wheelchair. An upgrade of the platforms to provide barrier-free access has long been desired by the population. Also a reconstruction of the station to return it to the layout before 1954 has also been repeatedly demanded. However, so far no firm planning for an upgrade have emerged.
