= Bebra station =

Railway station in Bebra, Germany

Bebra
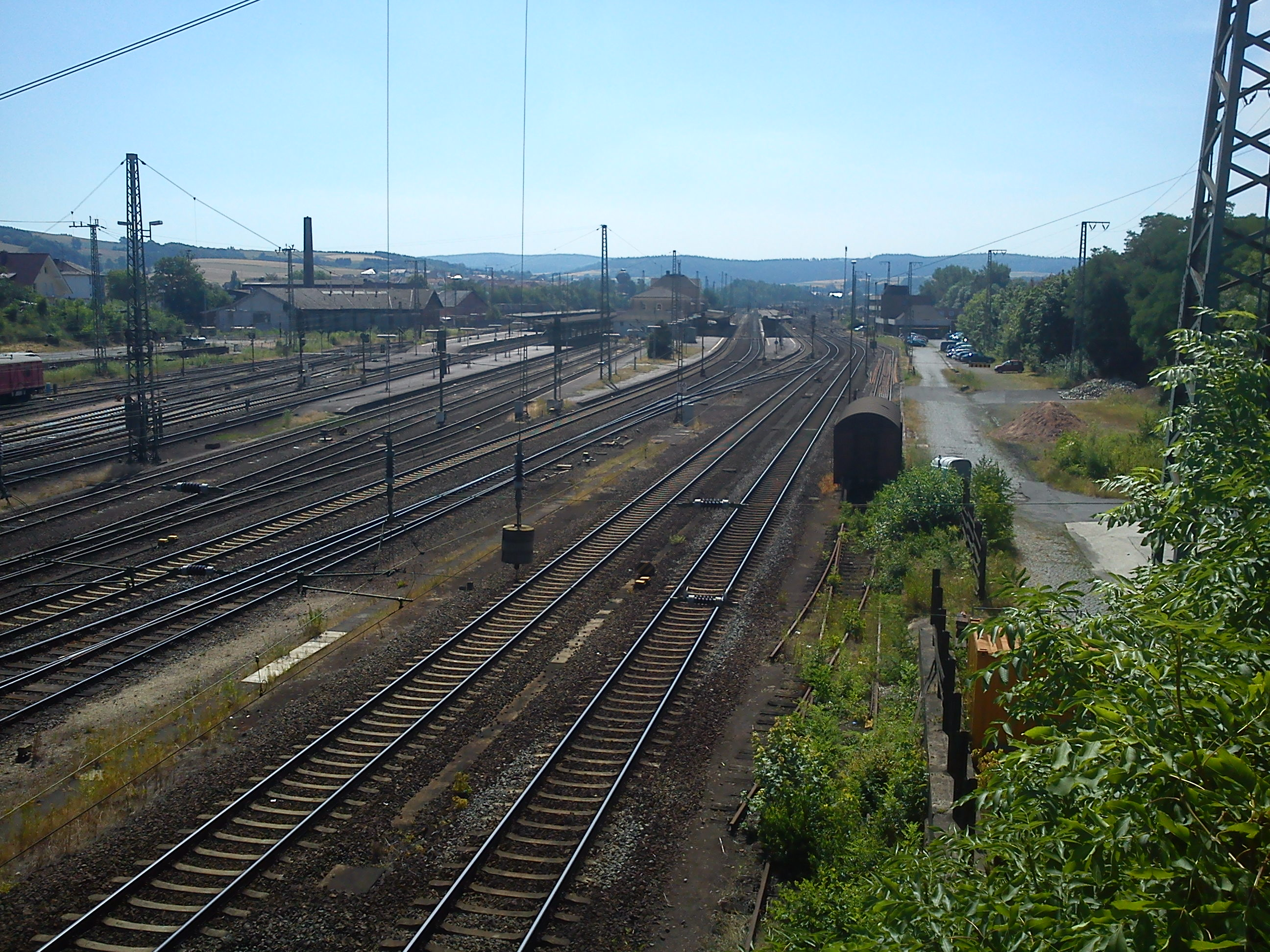

General information
- Location: Bahnhofstraße 10, Bebra, Hesse; Germany
- Coordinates: 50°58′09″N 9°47′52″E
- Lines: Frankfurt–Göttingen (km 166.6); Halle (Saale)–Bebra (km 210.4); Bebra–Kassel (km 210.4)
- Platforms: 5 (3, 5, 8–10)

Construction
- Accessible: Yes

Other information
- Station code: 226
- DS100 code: FB
- IBNR: 8000029
- Category: 3
- Fare zone: NVV: 2030; : 8810 (NVV transitional tariff)
- Website: www.bahnhof.de

History
- Opened: 28 August 1848

Services
Preceding station	Cantus	Following station
Rotenburg an der Fulda towards Kassel Hbf	RE 5	Bad Hersfeld Terminus
Lispenhausen towards Kassel Hbf	RB 5	Ludwigsau-Friedlos towards Fulda
Terminus	RB 6	Ronshausen towards Eisenach
Sontra towards Göttingen	RB 87	Terminus
Preceding station	DB Regio Mitte	Following station
Bad Hersfeld towards Frankfurt (Main) Hbf	RE 50 selected trains only	Terminus
Location
- Location within Hesse

Bebra station is a railway station on the German passenger and freight rail network in the northern Hesse town of Bebra. It is a railway junction as well as an intercity stop on the Dortmund–Berlin–Stralsund route. The station was opened in 1846 and quickly became a major transport hub. Bebra then developed into a classic railway town.

== History ==
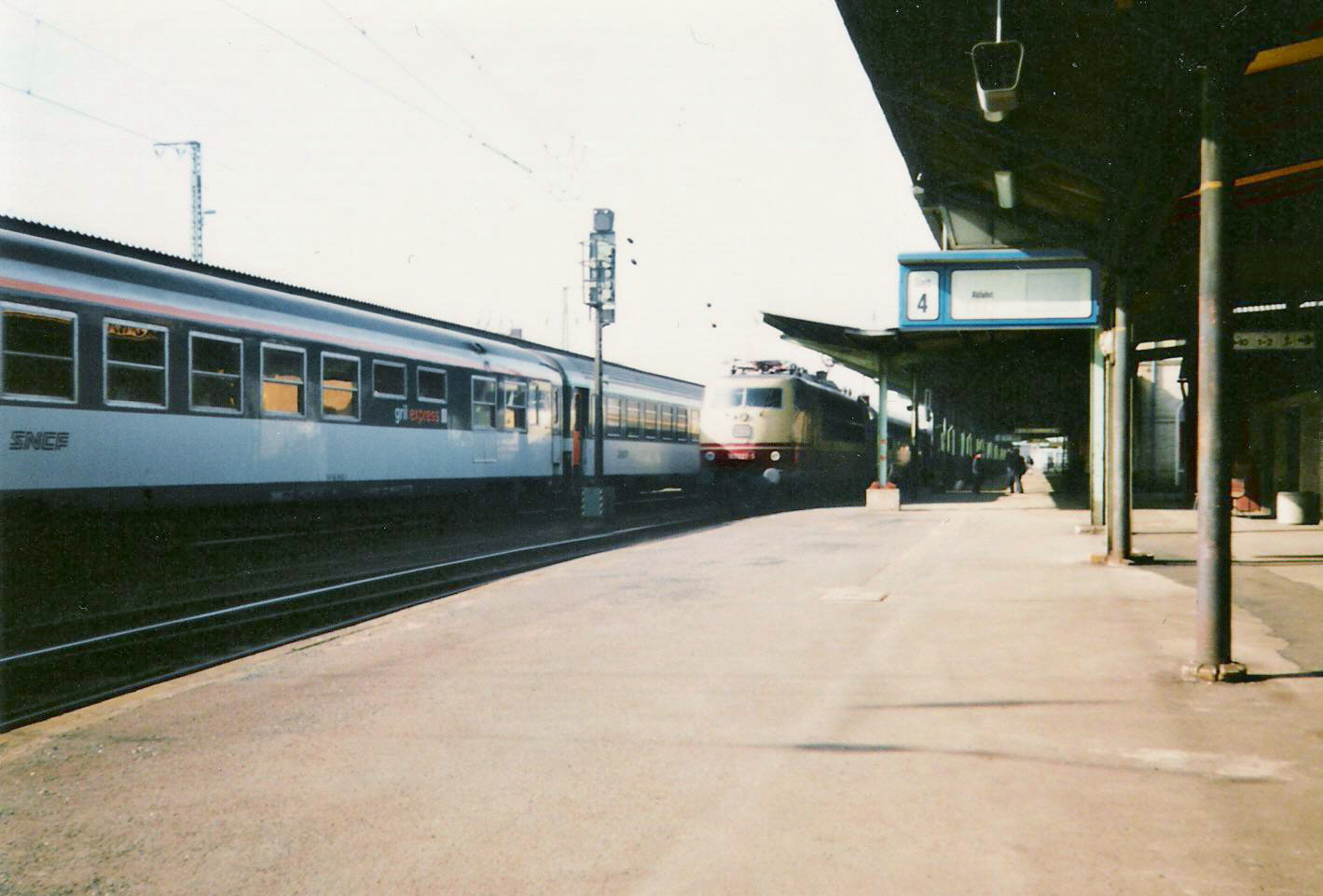
Bebra station in 1993

Bebra became part of the German railway network on 29 August 1848, with commissioning of the first section of the Frederick William Northern Railway to Guxhagen. On 25 September, the line was extended to Gerstungen. On the same day the Thuringian line to Halle was also extended to Bebra. In 1866 this was followed by the first section of the Frankfurt–Bebra railway to Bad Hersfeld and in 1875 by the line to Göttingen.

The present station building was built in 1869 on an island surrounded by rail tracks.

It experienced a small decline in importance with the opening of the Berlin curve in 1914, connecting between the Frankfurt–Bebra line and the Thuringian line and avoiding the reversal previously required in Bebra.

After World War II traffic in the area Bebra shifted more in a north–south direction as traffic heading east was disrupted by the nearby Inner German border. Bebra was, however, a border station for interzone trains to East Germany and transit trains and military trains of the Western powers to West Berlin. In Bebra, locomotives of the West German and East German railways were exchanged. From the summer 1973 timetable this was done in Gerstungen. The "Berlin curve" was not used while Germany was divided.

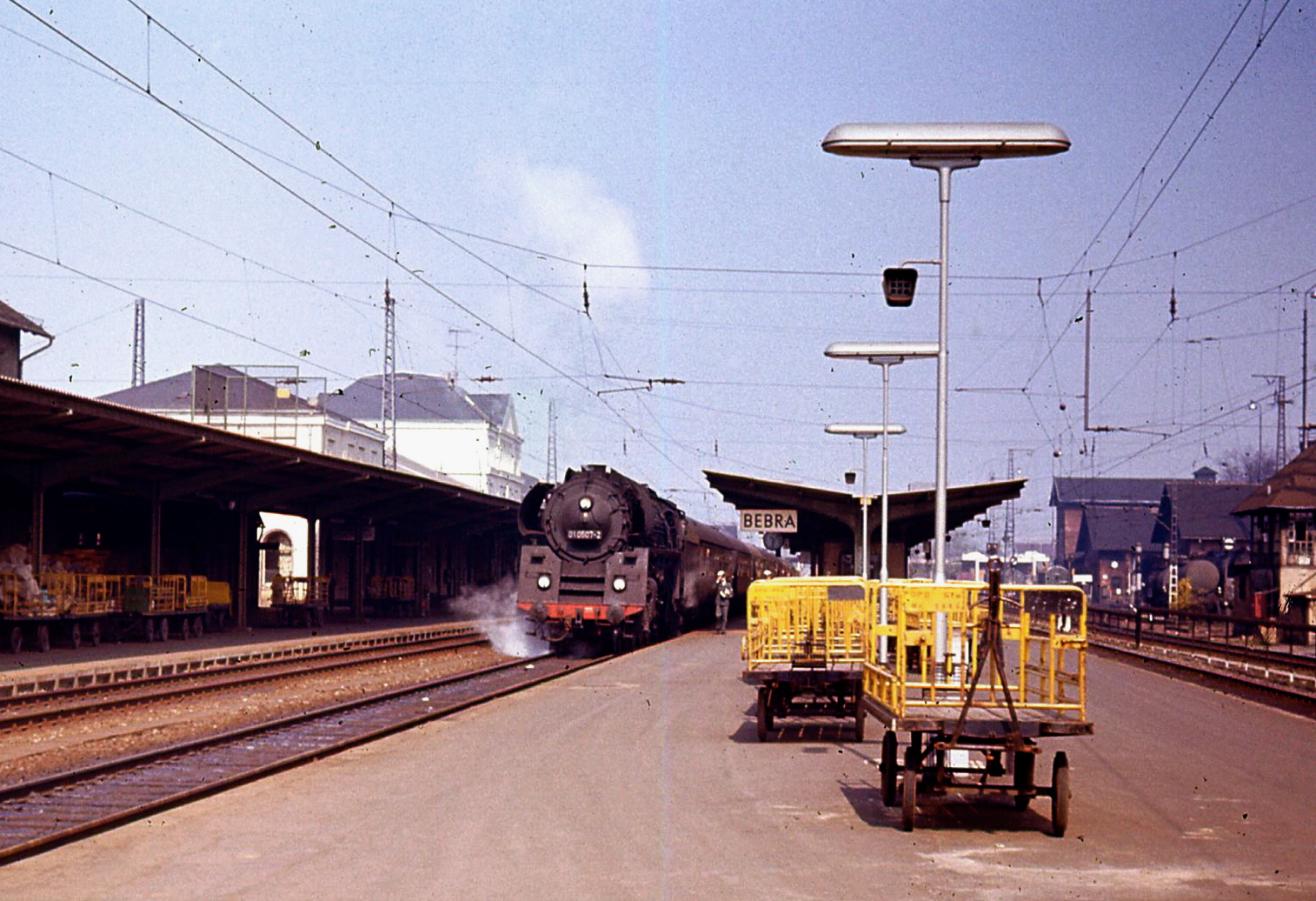
A view from Easter 1972; locomotive roundhouse on right

The electrification of the railways serving the station started in 1963. In 1990, the Berlin curve was rebuilt and put back into operation.

Bebra is now served by several regional lines. The marshalling yard is also one of Deutsche Bahn’s 13 cargo centres.

== Rail services ==
The following services serve Bebra station:

Line	Route	Operator	Frequency
RE 5 (NVV)	Kassel – Kassel-Wilhelmshöhe – Melsungen – Rotenburg an der Fulda – Bebra – Bad Hersfeld	cantus	60 min (weekdays); 120 min (weekend)
RE 5 (RMV)	Frankfurt Hbf – Frankfurt Süd – Hanau – Bad Soden-Salmünster – Schlüchtern – Fulda – Hünfeld – Bad Hersfeld – Bebra	DB Regio Mitte	Some trains
RE 50	Frankfurt Hbf – Frankfurt Süd - Offenbach – Hanau – Langenselbold – Gelnhausen – Wächtersbach – Bad Soden-Salmünster – Steinau (Straße) – Schlüchtern – Flieden – Neuhof (Kr Fulda) – Fulda – Hünfeld – Bad Hersfeld – Bebra	DB Regio Mitte	Some trains
RB 5	Kassel Hbf – Kassel-Wilhelmshöhe – Melsungen – Bebra – Bad Hersfeld – Hünfeld – Fulda	cantus	60 mins
RB 6	Bebra – Gerstungen – Eisenach	cantus	60 min (weekdays); 120 min (weekend)
RB 87	Göttingen – Eichenberg – Eschwege – Bebra	cantus	60 mins
