= Hanoverian Southern Railway =

Railway line in Germany

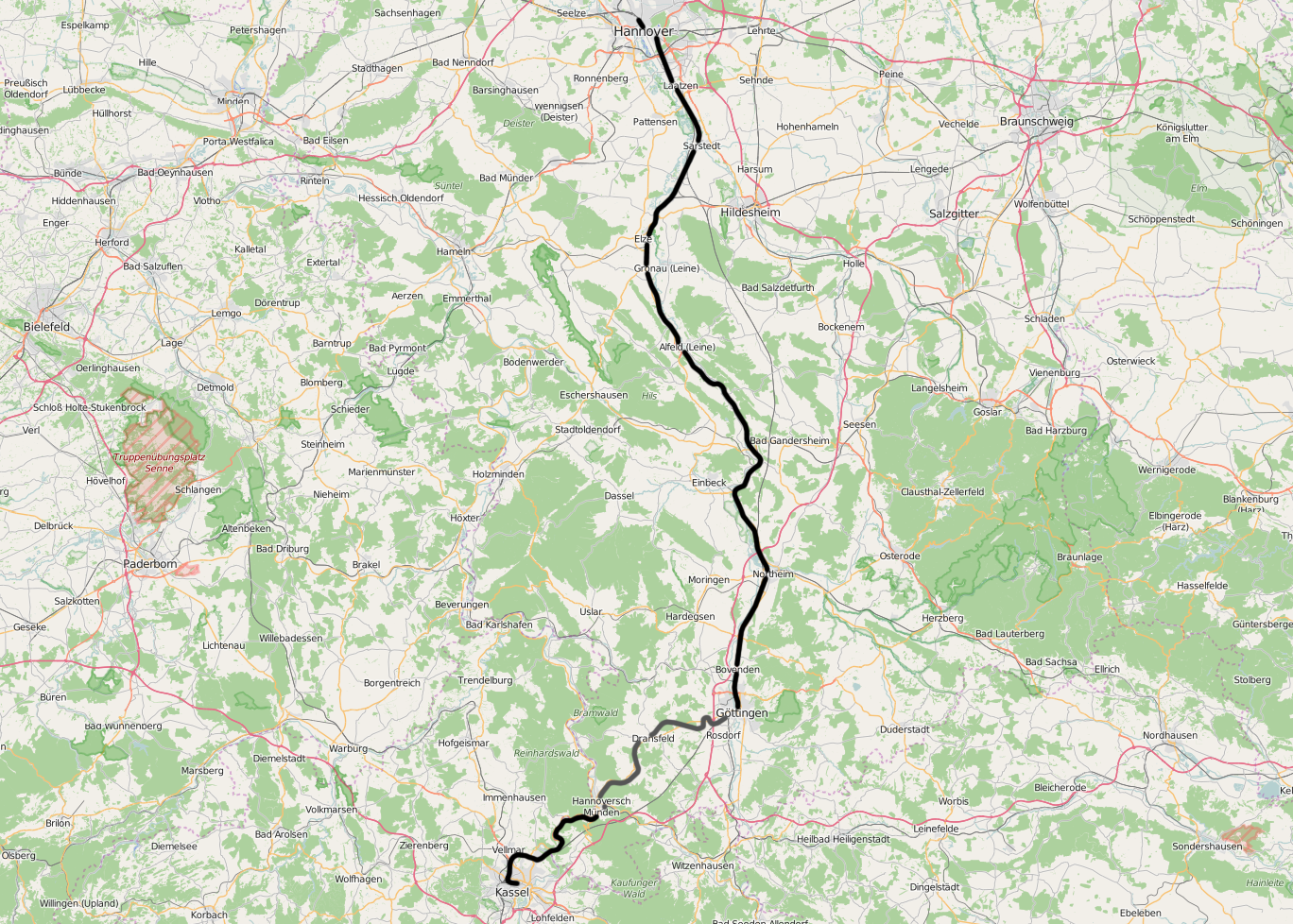

Overview
- Native name: Hannöversche Südbahn
- Line number: 1732
- Locale: Lower Saxony, Hesse, Germany
- Termini: Hannover; Kassel

Service
- Route number: 350 (ex 250, 257, 600)

Technical
- Line length: 166 km (103 mi)
- Track gauge: 1,435 mm (4 ft 8 1/2 in) standard gauge
- Electrification: 15 kV/16.7 Hz AC overhead catenary

The Hanoverian Southern Railway (German: Hannöversche Südbahn) is a historical term but it is still a common name for the line between Hanover and Kassel. It is a German main line railway in Lower Saxony and is one of the oldest lines in Germany, opened between 1853 and 1856 by the Royal Hanoverian State Railways.

== History ==
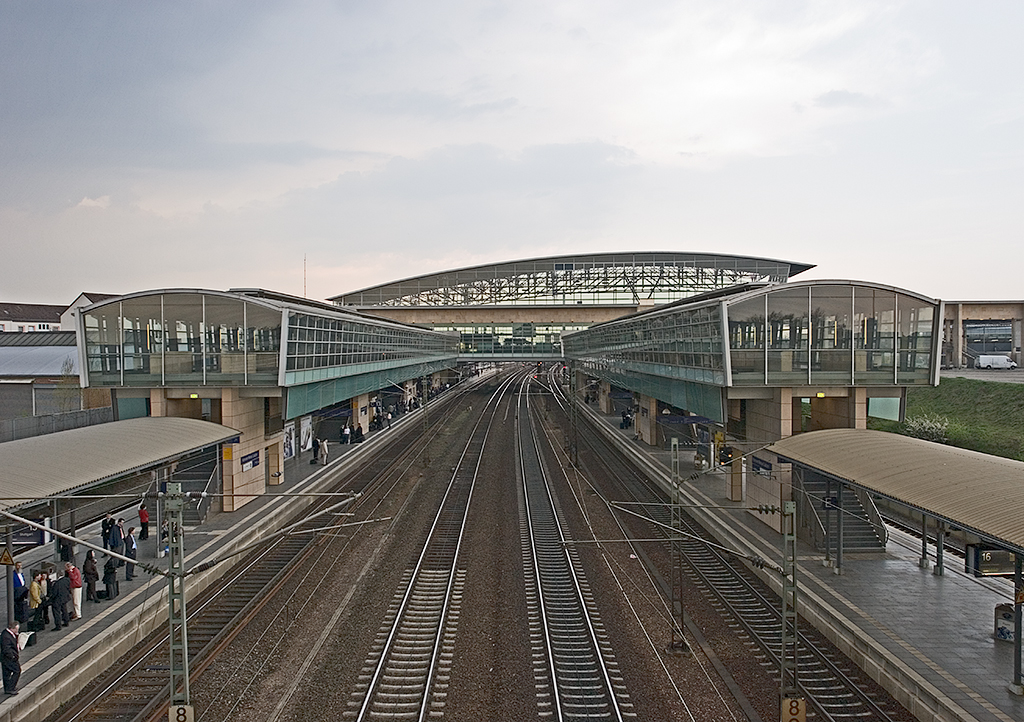
Messe/Laatzen station

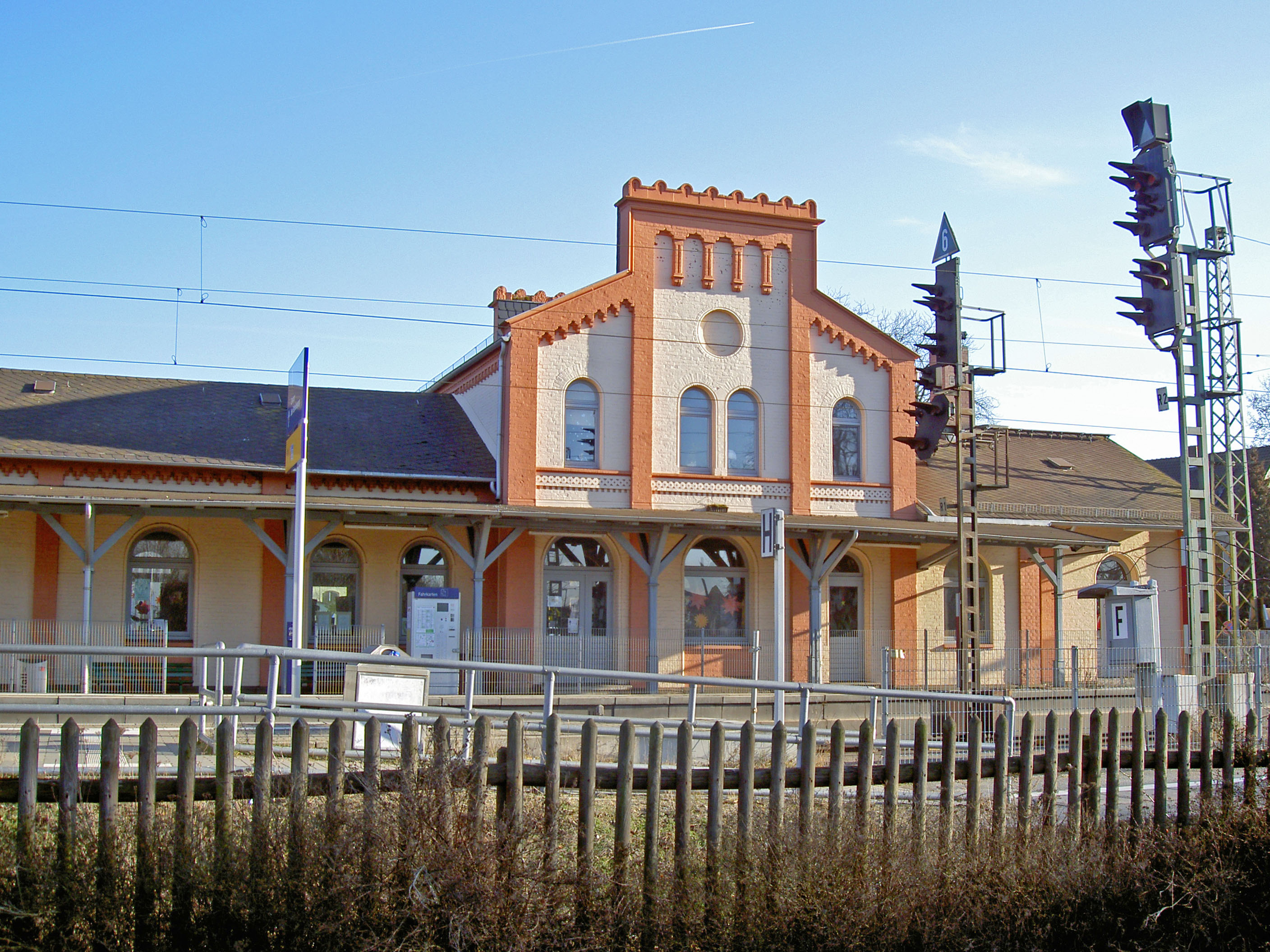
Sarstedt station

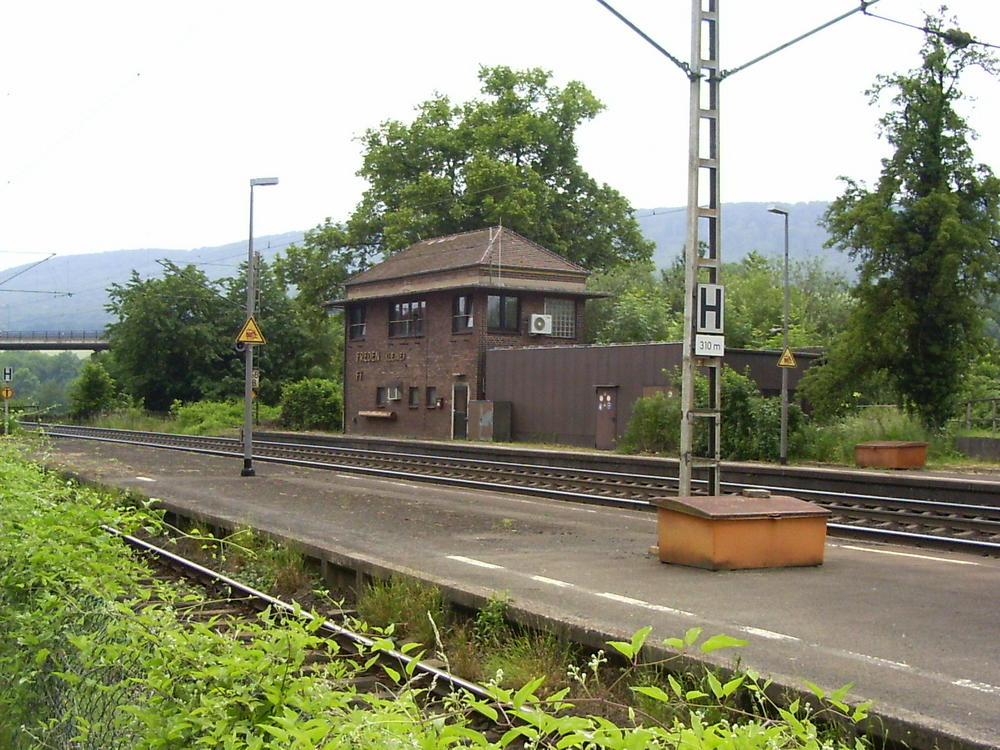
Freden (Leine) station

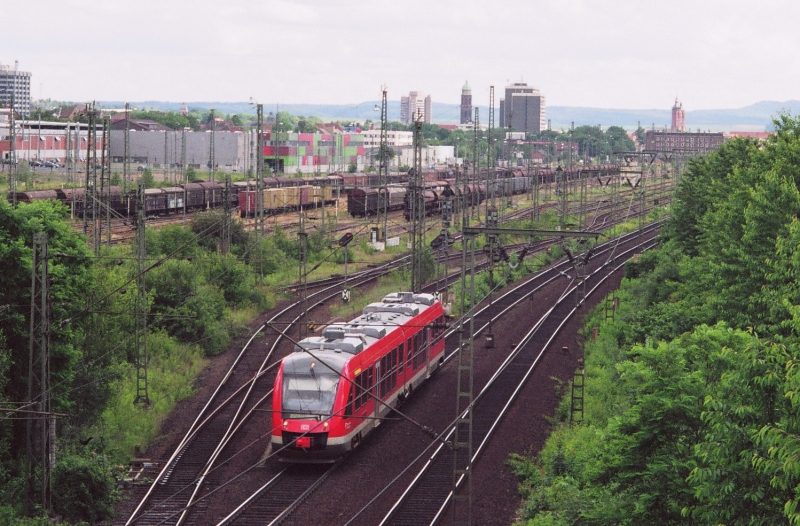
A railcar leaves Göttingen towards Nordhausen (South Harz line).

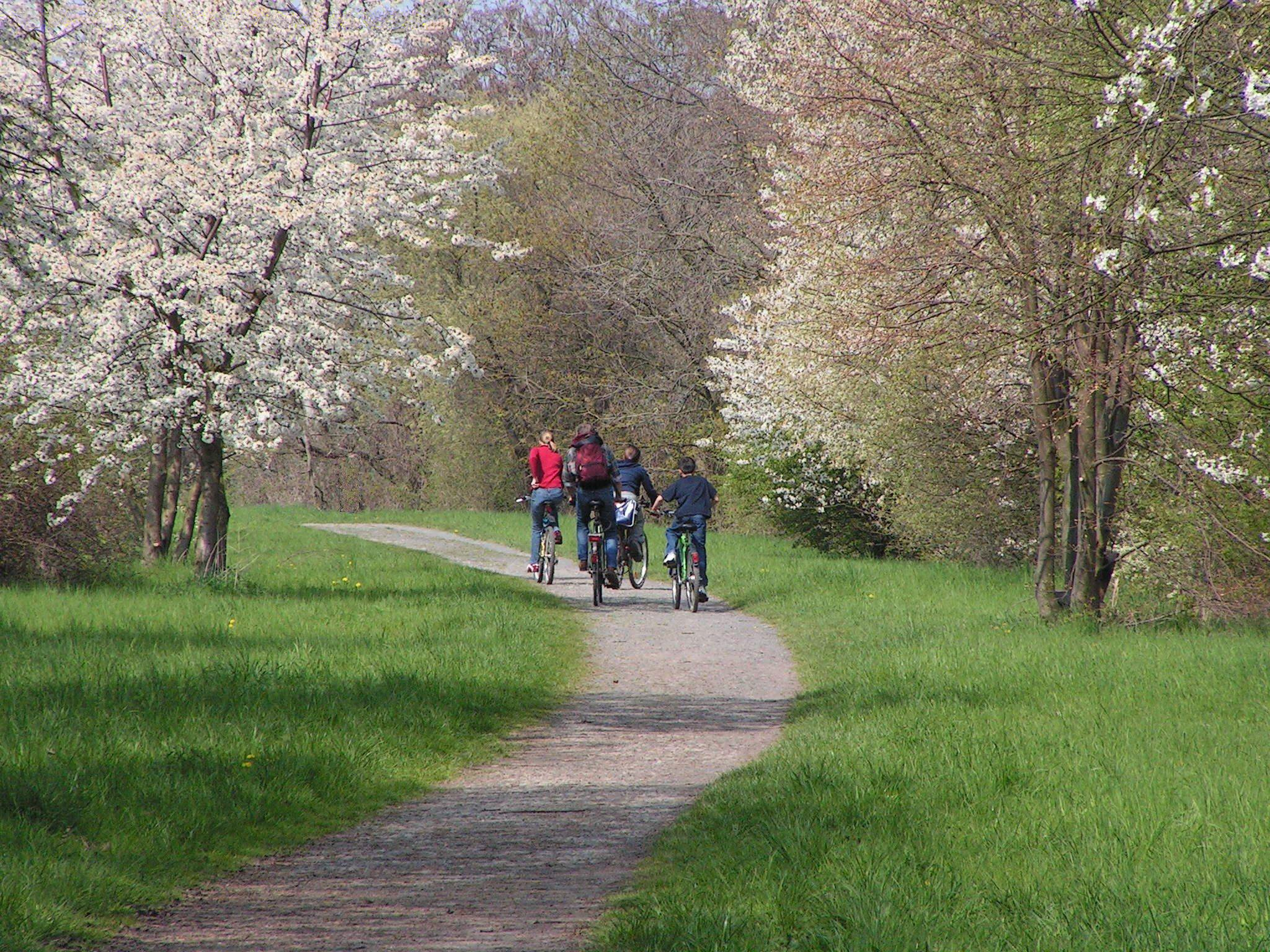
Section of cycle path on the former Dransfeld Ramp

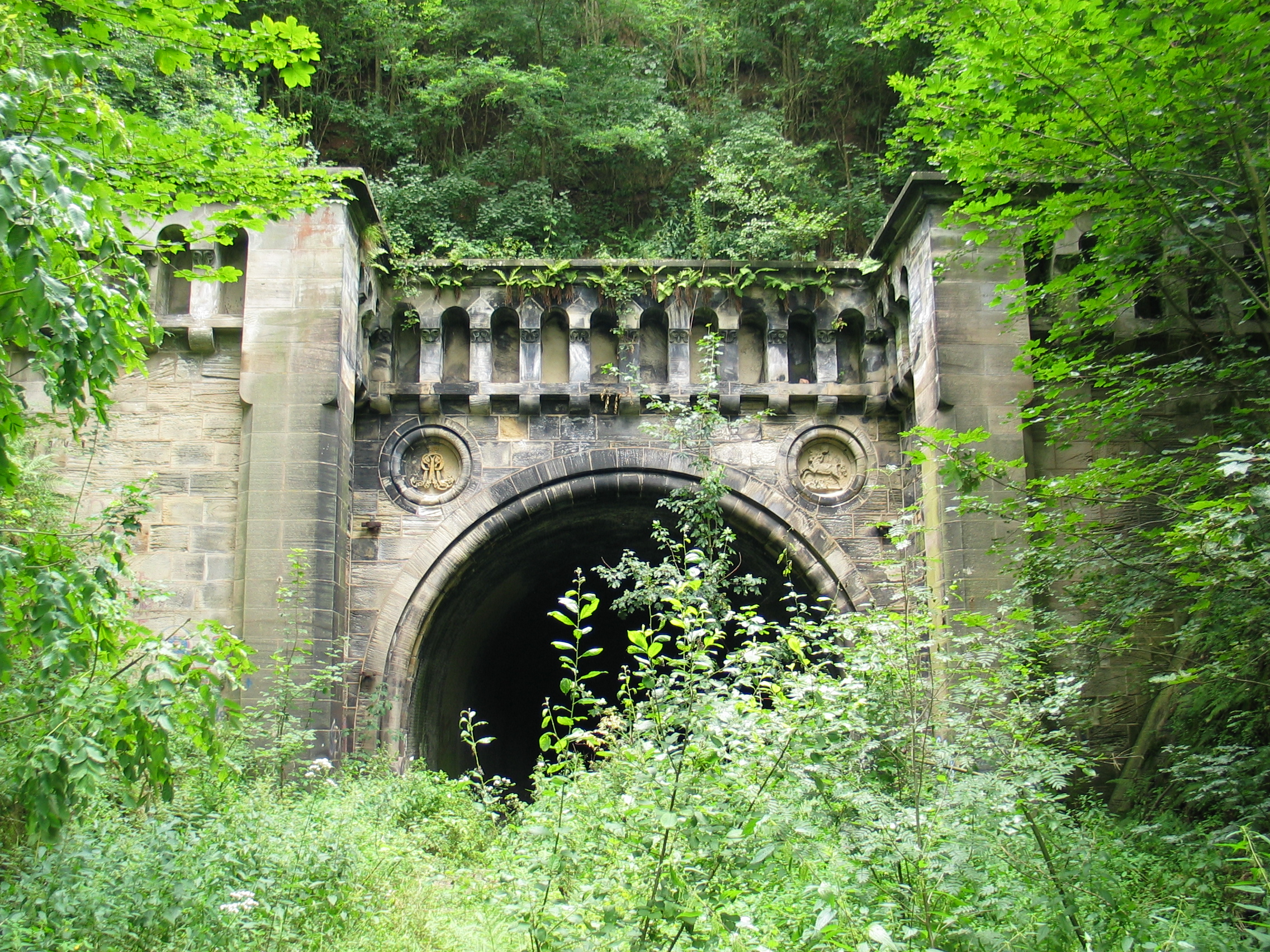
Southern portal to the abandoned Volkmarshaus Tunnel, first rail tunnel in the Kingdom of Hanover

Its northern sections from Hanover to Alfeld (opened in 1853) and Alfeld to Göttingen (opened in 1854) are part of a once important north-south route that continues in operation. The southern section, known as the Dransfeld Ramp (German: Dransfelder rampe) from Göttingen to Hannoverian Münden opened on 8 May 1856 and closed in stages between 1980 and 1995. The connection from Hann. Münden to Kassel was added in 1856 and continues in operation as part of the Halle–Kassel line.

The term Hanoverian Southern Railway fell out of official use after the annexation of the Kingdom of Hanover by Prussia after the War of 1866, but is now used by railway enthusiasts for the section between Hanover and Göttingen.

This line was built by the Royal Hanoverian State Railways and was therefore also intended to connect the trading centre of Münden with the capital of the Kingdom of Hanover. The route to Göttingen ran relatively easily through the Leine Valley, although it bypassed the major brewing city of Einbeck. In order to avoid passing through the former state of the Electorate of Hesse (Kurhessen), the line continued south through difficult terrain with steep grades between Dransfeld and Münden, known accordingly as the Dransfeld Ramp.

Until the 1960s, this whole length of the line was one of the most important lines in Germany. Due to the nearby post-war Inner German border, most rail traffic moved in a north-south direction, which made route the second busiest north-south link after those next to the Rhine between Cologne and Frankfurt (West and East Rhines).

This changed in the case of the Dransfeld Ramp when in 1963 with the electrification of the North–South line between Hanover and Gemünden am Main and in 1964 with the electrification of the connecting Werra Valley line between Kassel, Münden and Eichenberg. The Göttingen–Dransfeld–Münden section remained unwired. After that trains took the route via Eichenberg, although it was eight kilometres longer, because it had much gentler grades and was electrified. The Dransfelder ramp had three trains each way on weekdays until 1980, when passenger services on section were closed. Two years later the track between Göttingen and Dransfeld was dismantled. The rest of the section was served from Münden for 10 to 15 years as a freight siding, which was followed by the closure and partial degradation of the track.

In response to the ever-increasing traffic of the route in the 1960s, it was provided with new interlocking technology and additional passing tracks and upgraded infrastructure. The continuing increase in traffic led to consideration of the construction of a new line.

With the introduction of hourly InterCity (IC) trains on the Hanover–Göttingen line it became chronically overloaded. IC trains shared the track with express, commuter and freight trains. As a result of its terminal station layout, Kassel was left out of the IC network, with trains taking the Göttingen–Bebra route.

During the establishment of the Hanover–Würzburg high-speed line, part of the Southern Railway near Northeim was moved to the east. Only after operations commenced on the new line in November 1985, could work begin on the new line. In Hanover and Laatzen nine crossings were abolished as part of the building of the high-speed line. More crossings were abolished in the common section between Göttingen and Edesheim.

With the opening of the high-speed railway in 1991, most of the long-distance traffic on the Southern Railway moved to the new line.

== Operation today ==
Long-distance trains run almost exclusively on the high-speed line. Approximate hourly regional trains run on the Southern Railway on the Hamburg–Uelzen–Hanover-Göttingen route, operated by Metronom. Night trains and car-carrying passenger trains also use the "old" line. The line continues to be used frequently by freight trains.

Since the closure of the Dransfeld route to passenger trains in May 1980 all trains between Göttingen and Kassel run via Eichenberg, except high-speed trains, which run on the high-speed route.

=== Dransfeld ramp ===
The former section from Göttingen via Dransfeld to Hann. Münden is largely converted to a bicycle track or a habitat for fauna and flora, where it has become overgrown. Parts are now built over with houses or commercial buildings.
