= Kassel Hauptbahnhof =

Railway station in Kassel, Germany

Kassel Hbf
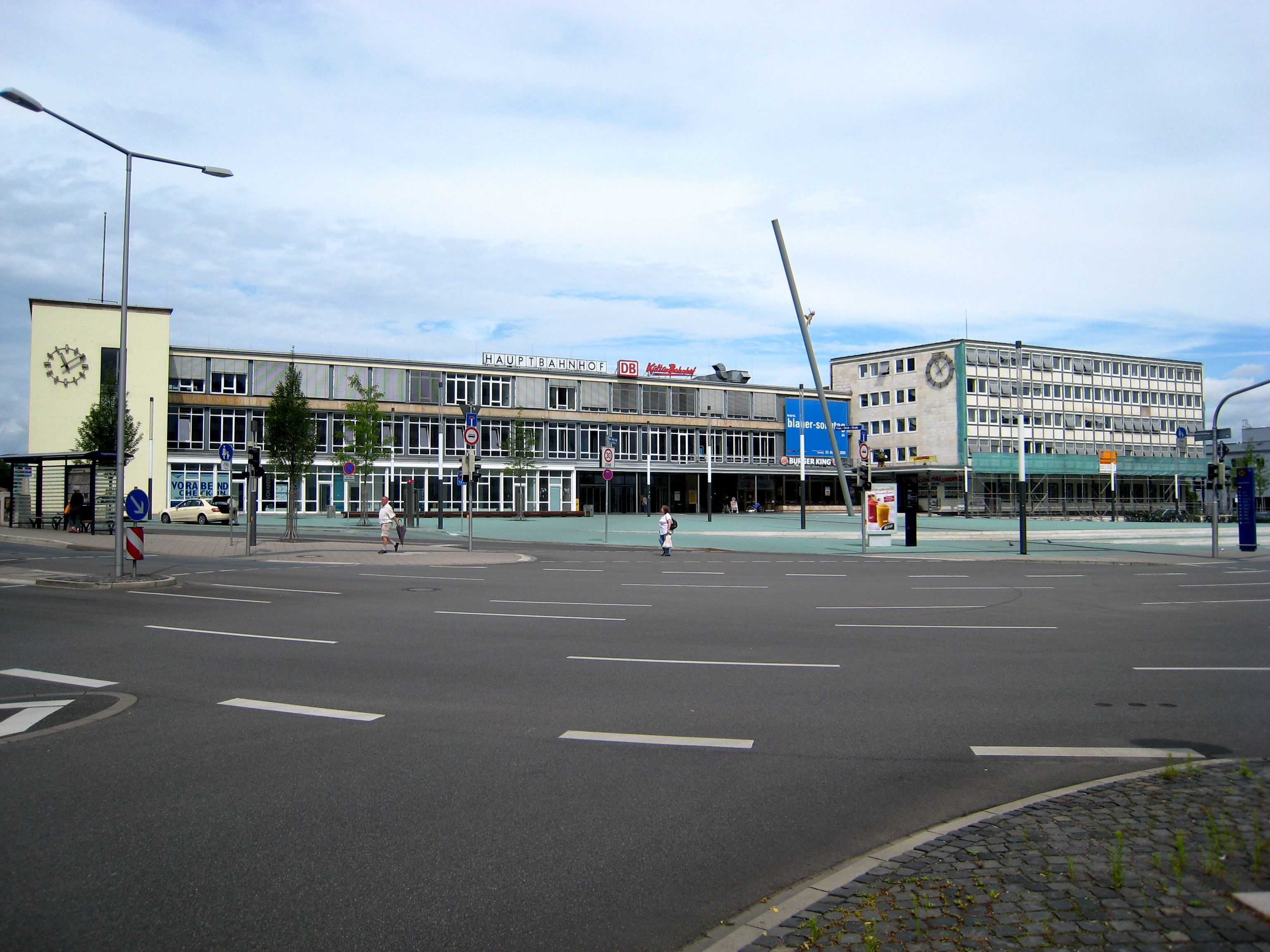
- Building of the station

General information
- Location: Bahnhhofsplatz; Mitte, Kassel, Hesse; Germany
- Coordinates: 51°19′5″N 9°29′24″E
- Owner: DB Netz
- Operator: DB Station&Service
- Lines: Kassel–Eichenberg; Kassel–Frankfurt; Kassel–Waldkappel; Kassel–Bebra; Kassel–Warburg
- Platforms: 13

Other information
- Station code: 3124
- DS100 code: FK
- Category: 2
- Fare zone: NVV: 3000
- Website: www.bahnhof.de

History
- Opened: 1856

Services
Preceding station	Cantus	Following station
Terminus	RE 5	Kassel-Wilhelmshöhe towards Bad Hersfeld
Terminus	RB 5	Kassel-Wilhelmshöhe towards Fulda
Terminus	RB 83	Vellmar-Niedervellmar towards Göttingen
Preceding station	DB Regio Mitte	Following station
Terminus	RE 30	Kassel-Wilhelmshöhe towards Frankfurt (Main) Hbf
Preceding station	Hessische Landesbahn	Following station
Terminus	RE 98	Kassel-Wilhelmshöhe towards Frankfurt (Main) Hbf
Preceding station	Kurhessenbahn	Following station
Terminus	RB 39	Kassel-Wilhelmshöhe towards Bad Wildungen
Preceding station	Kassel RegioTram	Following station
Kassel-Kirchditmold towards Hofgeismar-Hümme	1	Scheidemannplatz towards Kassel Hollandische Straße
Kassel-Kirchditmold towards Wolfhagen	4	Scheidemannplatz towards Kassel Hollandische Straße
Kassel-Wilhelmshöhe towards Melsungen	5	Scheidemannplatz towards Kassel Auestadion
Location

Kassel Hauptbahnhof is a Deutsche Bahn railway station in the city of Kassel, in the German state of Hesse. Situated in the central borough of Mitte, it is the city's second important railway station after the opening of Kassel-Wilhelmshöhe in 1991; and so it is the only Hauptbahnhof that is not the main station of its city.

== History ==
=== Early history ===
Construction of the station building, projected by Gottlob Engelhard, started in a period between 1851 and 1856. The style of the original building, bombed during World War II, was romantic neoclassical. The reconstruction, started in 1952, was completed in 1960 by the architect Friedrich Bätjer with the style of 1950s maintaining some original elements.

=== Recent history ===
When the Deutsche Bundesbahn began constructing the Hanover–Würzburg high-speed railway, Kassel originally was not supposed to have a station on the line at all. When it was decided to connect the city, Kassel posed a unique problem, Kassel was a terminal station. Options were discussed, among them the remodeling of Kassel's main station and the construction of an entirely new station. On 13 November 1981 construction of the high speed rail line started on Hesse territory, and it was decided to erect the new main station in the Kassel borough of Bad Wilhelmshöhe, opened on May 29, 1991.

In 1995 the station was thoroughly renovated and conceived (so far uniquely) as a Kulturbahnhof (cultural station). Thus emerged – in addition to art galleries, an architecture center and restaurants – an exhibition space for comic arts, the Caricatura museum and two repertory cinemas.

== Train services ==
The following services currently call at the station:

- Regional service RE 5 Kassel - Melsungen - Bebra - Bad Hersfeld
- Regional service RE 30 Kassel - Wabern - Treysa - Marburg - Gießen - Frankfurt
- Regional service RE 98 Kassel - Wabern - Treysa - Marburg - Gießen - Frankfurt
- Local service RB 5 Kassel - Melsungen - Bebra - Fulda
- Local service RB 39 Kassel - Wabern - Bad Wildungen
- Local service RB 83 Kassel - Eichenberg - Göttingen
- Tram-train service RT1 Hofgeismar-Hümme - Kassel - City Centre - Hollandische Straße
- Tram-train service RT4 Wolfhagen - Zierenberg - Kassel - City Centre - Hollandische Straße
- Tram-train service RT5 Melsungen - Kassel - City Centre - Auestadion

== Structure and transport ==
Kassel Hauptbahnhof is a terminal station with 8 tracks and other 3 in the tunnel station for the RegioTram (a sort of Stadtbahn). The station is served by several lines of the RegioTram and buses. Regular Kassel trams no longer serve the station.

Due to its central position in the city it is a busy station, terminal of several regional DB lines:

- Frederick William Northern Railway to Bebra and Frankfurt–Bebra line to Fulda,
- Halle–Kassel line to Eichenberg and Bebra–Göttingen line to Göttingen,
- Halle–Kassel line to Halle,
- Frederick William Northern Railway to Bebra and Thuringian Railway to Erfurt,
- Main-Weser line to Frankfurt,
- Kassel–Warburg railway to Warburg and Upper Ruhr Valley Railway to Hagen,
- Volkmarsen–Vellmar-Obervellmar line to Volkmarsen and Warburg–Sarnau line to Korbach and
- Edersee Railway to Bad Wildungen.

== Gallery ==
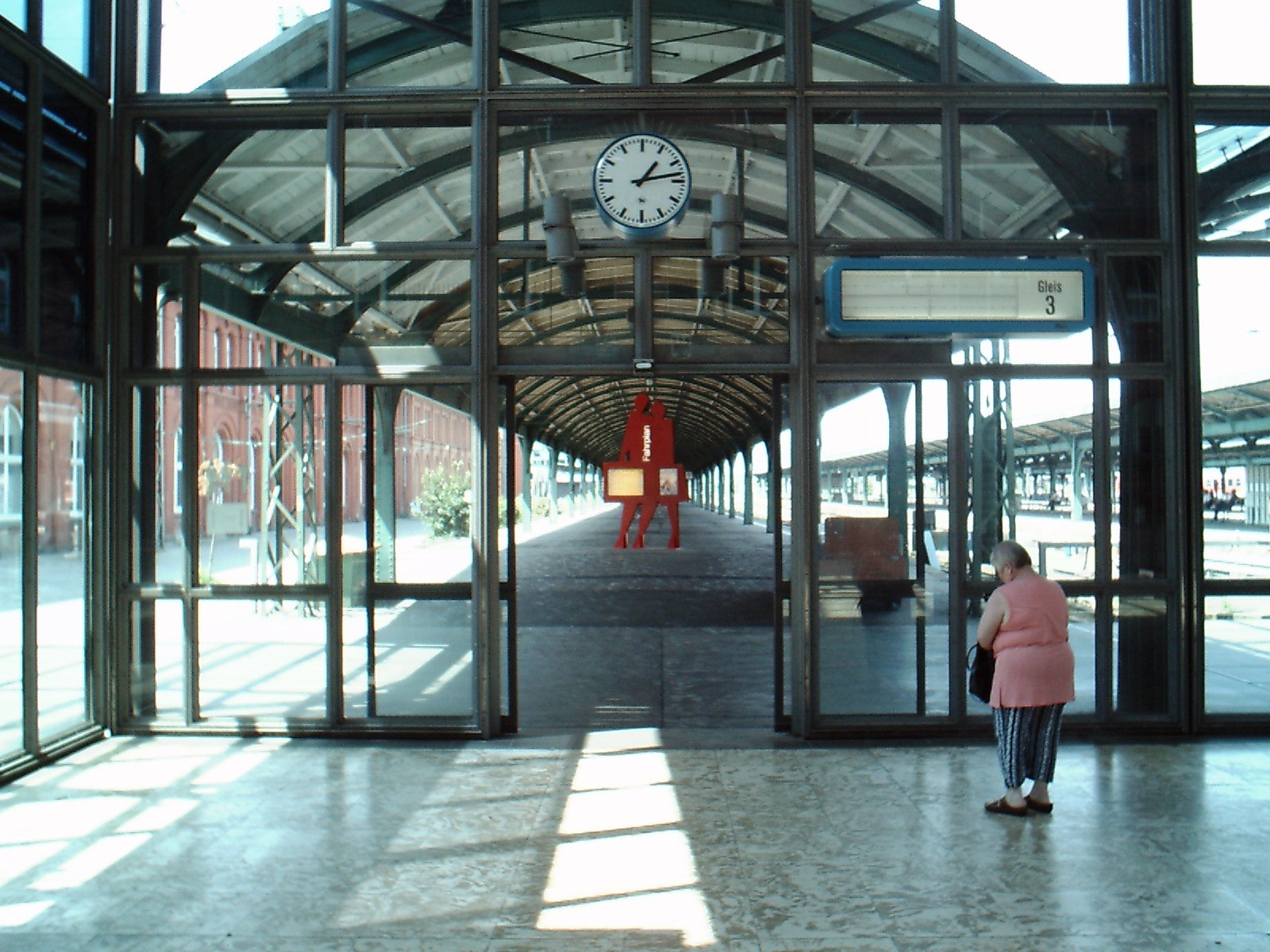
Entrance to the station

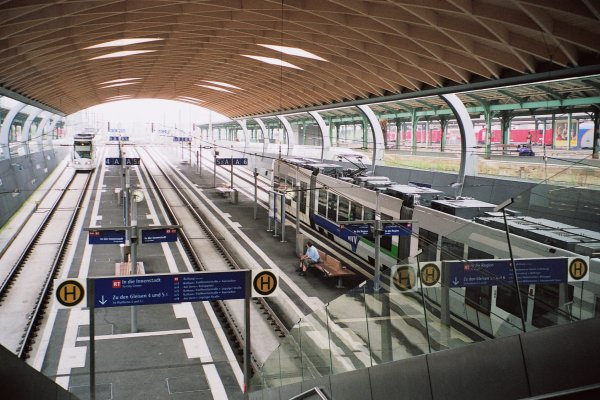
Platforms for RegioTram

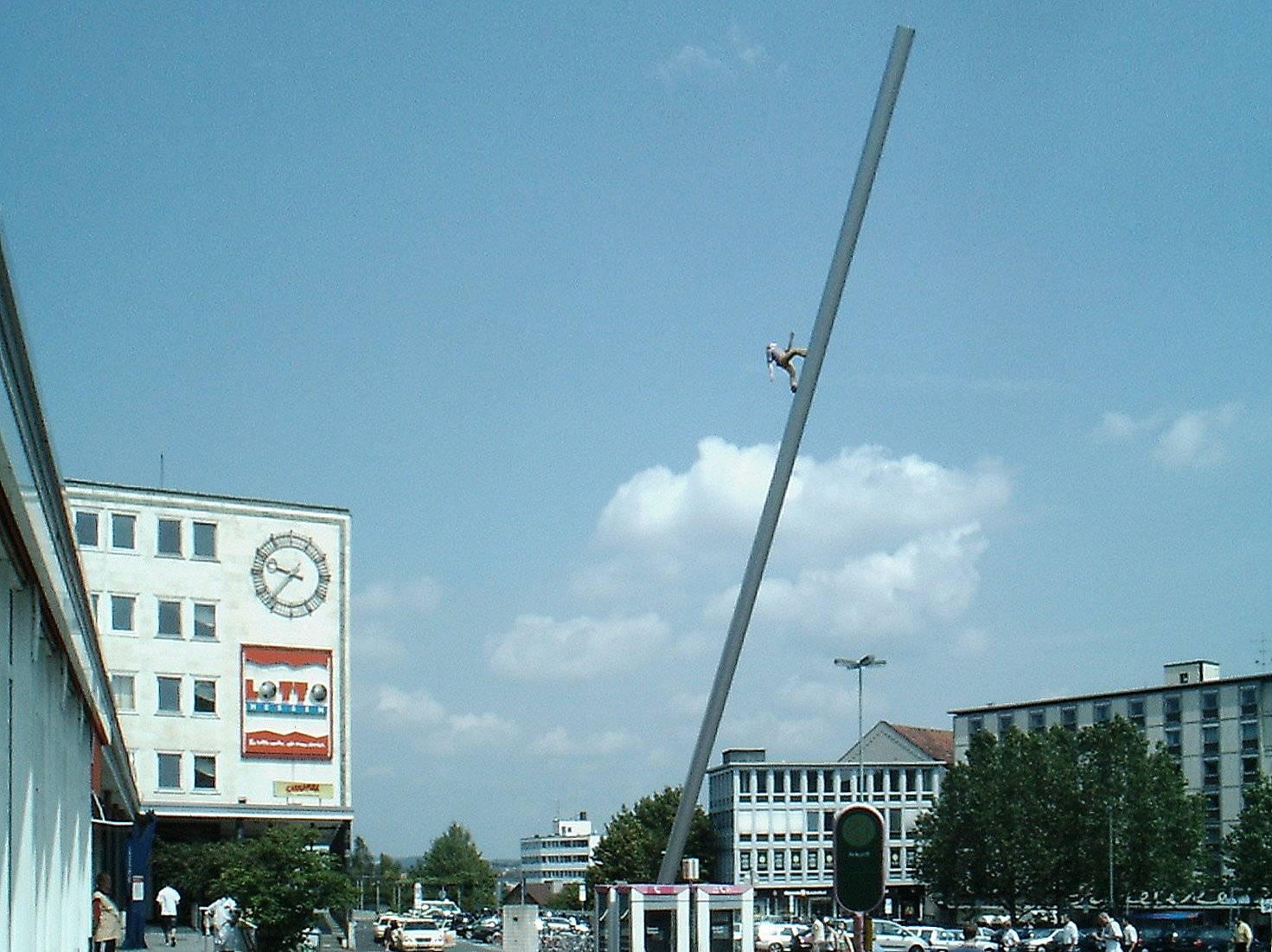
Himmelsstürmer (Man walking to the sky), realized for the Documenta in 1992 by Jonathan Borofsky, in the station square.

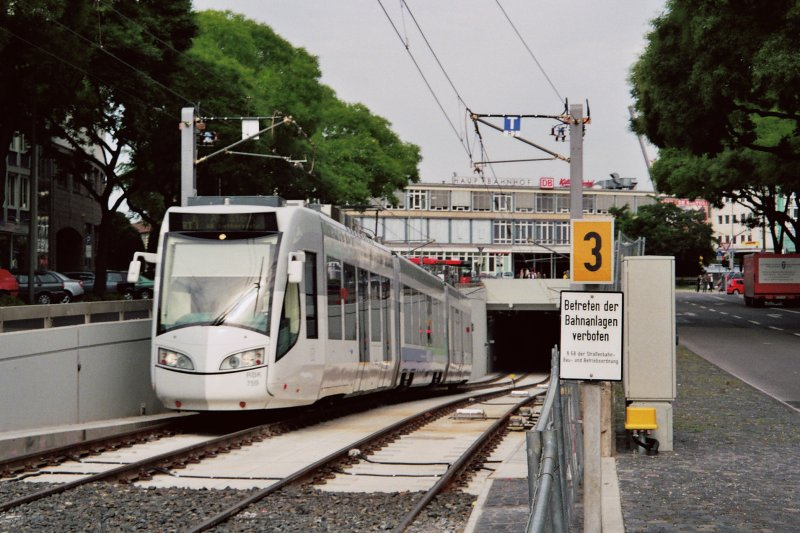
RegioTram tunnel at Hauptbahnhof. In background, the station building

== See also ==
- Kassel-Wilhelmshöhe
- List of railway stations in Hesse
