= Bebra–Baunatal-Guntershausen railway =

Electrified train line in Hesse, Germany

Bebra–Baunntal-Guntershausen railway

Overview
- Native name: Bahnstrecke Bebra–Baunatal-Guntershausen
- Status: Operational
- Owner: Deutsche Bahn
- Line number: 6340
- Locale: Hesse
- Termini: Bebra; Baunatal-Guntershausen
- Stations: 13

Service
- Type: Heavy rail, Passenger rail Regional rail
- Route number: 610
- Operator(s): Cantus, Nordhessischer Verkehrsverbund

History
- Opened: Stages between 1848–1849

Technical
- Line length: 44.3 km (27.5 mi)
- Number of tracks: Double track
- Track gauge: 1,435 mm (4 ft 8 1/2 in) standard gauge
- Electrification: 15 kV/16.7 Hz AC Overhead line
- Operating speed: 130 km/h (81 mph)

The Bebra–Baunatal-Guntershausen railway is a two-track, electrified main line in the German state of Hesse, connecting Kassel with Bebra and Gerstungen on the border with Thuringia, as well as with Bad Karlshafen (formerly) and Warburg on the border with Westphalia. It was originally part of the Friedrich-Wilhelms-Nordbahn ("Frederick William Northern Railway"), which was completed in 1849. It was one of the first railway lines in the Electorate of Hesse and in Germany.

== Route ==
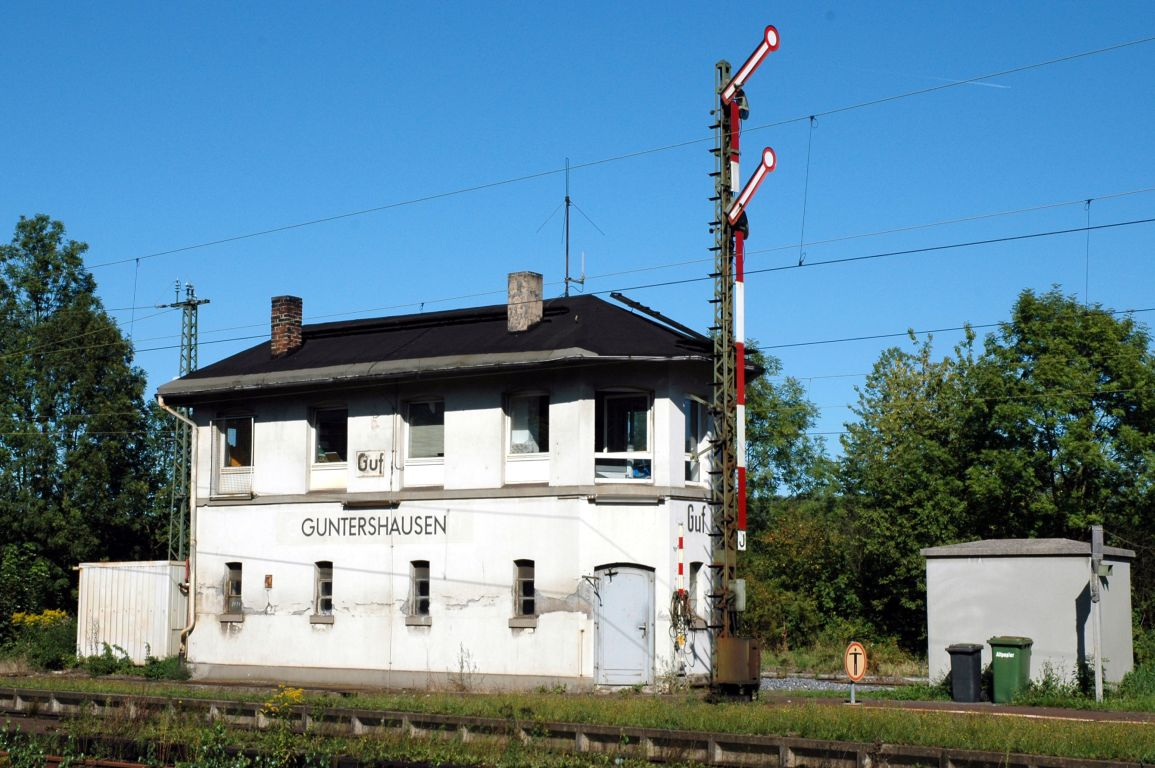
Guntershausen station

The Frederick William Northern Railway was built by the Frederick William Northern Railway Company (Friedrich-Wilhelms-Nordbahn-Gesellschaft) and named after Frederick William, the Elector of Hesse. It was part of a continuous east–west rail link built between Westphalia and Halle. In Kassel it connected with it the Carl Railway (Carl Bahn), running to the north, which in turn connected in Hümme with the line to Warburg and Westphalia. In Gerstungen it connected with the line of the Thuringian Railway Company. In Warburg it connected to the Hamm–Warburg line of the Royal Westphalian Railway Company.

== Formation ==
The states of Saxe-Weimar-Eisenach, Saxe-Coburg and Gotha, Prussia and the Electorate of Hesse negotiated from 1840 on the building of an east–west railway. Between Gerstungen in the east of Hesse-Kassel and Haueda (near Liebenau) on the border with Westphalia, the route runs through Bebra and Kassel, then capital of Hesse-Kassel. An agreement was reached in the autumn of 1841. In 1844 the Frederick William Northern Railway Company received a concession to build the line in Hesse-Kassel.

== Name ==
The line was renamed the Electoral Frederick William Northern Railway (Kurfürst-Friedrich-Wilhelms-Nordbahn) in 1853 and after the annexation of Hesse-Kassel by Prussia as a result of the Austro-Prussian War in 1866 it was renamed Hessian Northern Railway (Hessische Nordbahn).

The name Frederick William Northern Railway is not only applied to the line between Kassel and Bebra, but also to the whole route between Warburg and Gerstungen. The first line built in the Electorate was the Carl Railway, the line between Kassel and the Weser river port of Carlshafen (now Bad Karlshafen) then considered the most important line to be built in the state. Subsequently, the two links to Warburg and Gerstungen were added to create the Frederick William Northern Railway.

It soon became apparent, however, that the expected traffic to Carlshafen would not eventuate, as traffic quickly moved from the Weser to the emerging rail network. The line to Carlshafen soon became a line of only local significance. This meant that the name Carl Railway was applied to the branch from Hümme to Carlshafen. The name of the Frederick William Northern Railway was transferred to the much longer line between Warburg and Gerstungen.

Thus, from the Hessian perspective, the Frederick William Northern Railway was the first stage of a plan to build a rail network in the Electorate. Only the western branch and the Main-Weser Railway were completed during the existence of Hesse-Kassel. The eastern branch from Bebra to Fulda and Hanau (the Frankfurt–Bebra line),—all Hessian cities and thus of highest priority for the Electorate—crossed difficult topography and therefore was not completed until Hesse-Kassel was annexed by Prussia in 1866.

== Construction ==
On 1 July 1845 the groundbreaking ceremony was celebrated for the construction of the line and by 29 December 1849 the entire route was opened to traffic. It connected in Gunterhausen with the Main-Weser Railway and in Kassel with the Carl Railway. Between Guntershausen and Bebra it follows the Fulda Valley.

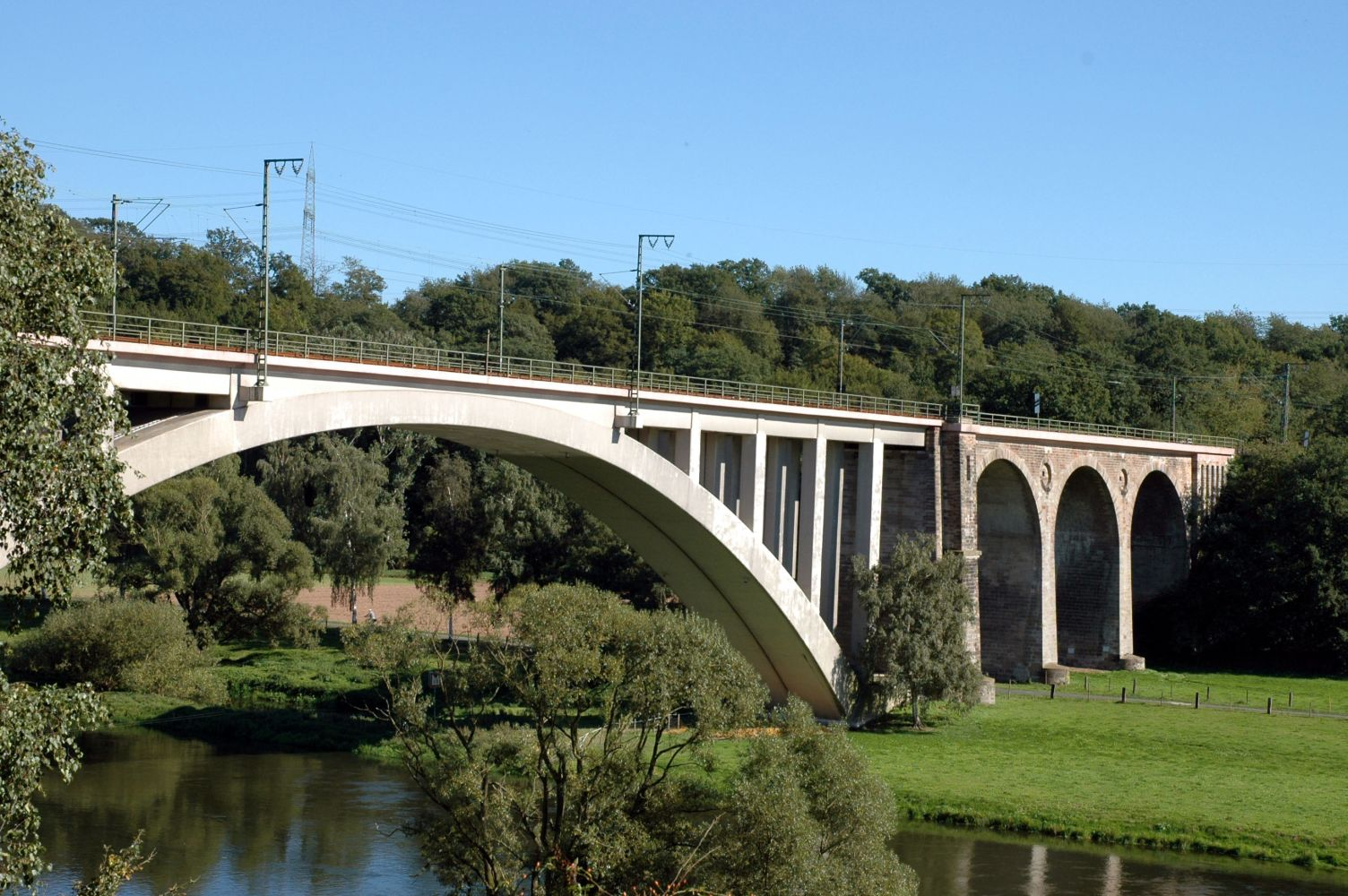
Fulda river viaduct near Baunatal-Guntershausen

Sections of track were opened as follows:

- Bebra–Malsfeld–Guxhagen: 29 August 1848
- Gerstungen–Bebra: 25 September 1849
- Guxhagen–Baunatal: 25 September 1849
- Guntershausen–Kassel: 29 December 1849 (Main-Weser Railway)

The route is now used by several Intercity lines.

== Sources ==
- Landesamt für Denkmalpflege Hessen, ed. (2005). Eisenbahn in Hessen. Kulturdenkmäler in Hessen. Denkmaltopographie Bundesrepublik Deutschland (Railways in Hesse. Cultural sites in Hesse. Monument topography of the Federal Republic of Germany) (in German). Vol. 2. Stuttgart: Theiss Verlag. pp. 102ff (lines 006–009). ISBN 3-8062-1917-6.
- Hager, Bernhard (December 2007 – January 2008). "Spuren einer anderen Zeit. Die Magistrale Eisenach - Bebra im Spiegel der Geschichte (Traces of another time. The Eisenach–Bebra railway in the mirror of history)". Eisenbahn Geschichte (in German) (25): 10–25.
