= List of mountains and hills of the Rhön =

This is a list of mountains and hills of the Rhön, a low mountain range in the Central Uplands of Germany that straddles the three federal states of Bavaria, Hesse and Thuringia. This list includes summits within the Rhön Mountains and its foothills, taking in the Rhön Biosphere Reserve and the nature parks of the Bavarian Rhön, Hessian Rhön and, where it belongs to the Rhön, the Hessian Spessart. The table currently shows mountains over 900 metres high. It will be extended over time.

Six columns in the following table, which on start up is arranged by height in metres (m) above sea level (NHN datum unless otherwise stated based on), are sortable by clicking on the symbols by their headings. In the columns "Mountain, hill, subpeak“ alternative names are given in brackets, in smaller font and italics. In these columns, where entries bear the same name they are disambiguated by the name of the municipality to which they belong shown in brackets and small font. Mountains or hills that have a low isolation or prominence and are therefore not considered independent peaks, are marked with the abbreviation "SP" for "subpeak" and their parent peak is named. In the "state" column, where a mountain or hill lies within two or more states, the state in which the actual summit lies is printed in bold.

A key to the abbreviations is at the bottom of the table.

| Mountain, hill, subpeak (coordinates) | Elevation (m) | Natural region; Nature park, Biosphere reserve | Location Villages (near/between) | County/counties (see below) | State/ States (see below) | Location of (sights; nature reserves; Rivers/sources) | Image |
|---|---|---|---|---|---|---|---|
| Wasserkuppe (50°29′53″N 9°56′16″E) | 950.0 | Wasserkuppenrhön; Hessian Rhön NP, Rhön BR | Abtsroda, Obernhausen, Reulbach, Sieblos, Tränkhof | FD | HE | highest mountain in the Rhön and Hesse; Nordhang Wasserkuppe NR, Wasserkuppe Airfield, German Gliding Museum, Wasserkuppe Ski and Toboggan Arena; S: Brandbach, S: Fulda, S: Haardt, S: Lütter | The Wasserkuppe seen from south |
| Dammersfeldkuppe (50°23′48.8″N 9°51′43.6″E) | 927.9 | Dammersfeld Ridge; Hessian Rhön NP, Rhön BR | Dalherda, Neuwildflecken, Rommers, Wildflecken | FD, KG, FD, KG | HE, **BV**, HE, BV | highest mountain in RB Lower Franconia; Wildflecken Training Area; Rhine-Weser Watershed, S: Gichenbach, S: Kleine Sinn | The Dammersfeldkuppe in Wildflecken Training Area |
| Kreuzberg (50°22′13″N 9°58′48″E) | 927.8 | Kreuzberg Group; Bavarian Rhön NP, Rhön BR | Bischofsheim, Haselbach, Kilianshof, Oberwildflecken, Sandberg, Waldberg | NES, NES, NES, KG, NES, NES | BV | "Holy Mountain of the Franconians", Kreuzberg Abbey, Kreuzberg Transmitter, Kreuzberg Ski Area, (large) summit cross; S: Sinn | View from the Kissinger Hut on the Schwarzenberg looking northeast towards the Kreuzberg |
| Heidelstein (West/East Top); Heidelstein: Schwabenhimmel: (50°27′37.8″N 10°0′24.6″E) | 925.7 m 925.7; 912.6 | Long Rhön; Bavarian Rhön NP, Hessian Rhön NP, Rhön BR | Ginolfs, Holzberg, Wüstensachsen | NES, NES, FD | **BV**, BV, HE | near: Rotes Moor NR, Heidelstein transmitter, Rhön Club commemoration site, Rotes Moor Cross Country Skiing Centre, Long Rhön Nature Reserve (Longe Rhön), Kesselrain NR; S: Els, S: Schwarzbach, S: Sonder, S: Ulster | View from the Wachtküppel looking east towards the Heidelstein |
| Eierhauckberg (50°24′21.5″N 9°54′4.3″E) | 909.9 | Dammersfeld Ridge; Hessian Rhön NP, Rhön BR | Neuwildflecken, Rengersfeld, Rommers, Wildflecken | KG, FD, FD, KG | BV, **HE**, HE, BV | Wildflecken Training Area, Rhine-Weser Watershed | View of the Eierhauckberg from the northeast |
| Abtsrodaer Kuppe (50°30′15.1″N 9°56′17.4″E) | 904.8 | Wasserkuppenrhön; Hessian Rhön NP, Rhön BR | Abtsroda, Reulbach, Sieblos, Tränkhof | FD | HE | Basalt summit with good views, part of the Wasserkuppe Ski and Toboggan Arena | View looking north to the summit of the Abtsrodaer Kuppe with the villages of Dietges and Brand and the Kuppenrhön in the background |
| Stirnberg (50°29′28.6″N 10°2′20.5″E) | 901.9 | Long Rhön; Bavarian Rhön NP, Hessian Rhön NP, Rhön BR | Roth, Wüstensachsen | NES, FD | **BV**, HE | Long Rhön (Lange Rhön) NR, Stirnberg bei Wüstensachsen NR, Rhine-Weser Watershed | |
| Hohe Hölle (50°25′43″N 9°57′41″E) | 893.8 | Dammersfeld Ridge; Bavarian Rhön NP, Hessian Rhön NP, Rhön BR | Frankenheim, Mosbach, Oberweißenbrunn | R-G, FD, R-G | BV, **HE**, BV | Schwedenwall; Skilift/piste | View from direction of Mosbach south-southeast to the Hohe Hölle |
| Steinkopf (Wüstensachsen) (50°28′41.1″N 10°1′6″E) | 888 | Lange Rhön; Bavarian Rhön NP, Hessian Rhön NP, Rhön Br | Wüstensachsen, Ginolfs | FD, R-G | **HE**, BV | Basalt blockfield pile, Steinkopf NR; Rhine-Weser watershed, S: Heuwiesenwasser | View from the direction of the Schwarzwald bei Wüstensachsen NR (near the Ottilienstein, on the B 278) east towards the Steinkopf |
| Himmeldunkberg (aAbb v. Hohe Hölle) (50°25′22.5″N 9°57′34.9″E) | 887,9 | Dammersfeld Ridge; Bavarian Rhön NP, Hessian Rhön NP, Rhön BR | Frankenheim, Mosbach, Oberweißenbrunn, Rodenbach | R-G, FD, R-G, FD | **BV**, HE, BV, HE | Hexenbuchen (ND), Würzburger Hut (DAV hut); Rhine-Weser watershed, S: Stecheller | View from Rockenstein looking N to the Himmeldunkberg |
| Mittelberg (50°24′34.6″N 9°54′50.9″E) | 880 | Dammersfeld Ridge; Hessian Rhön NP, BR Rhön | Neuwildflecken, Oberweißenbrunn, Rengersfeld | KG, R-G, FD | BV, BV, HE | Wildflecken Trg Area, tx mast, tx tower, skilift; S: Bärnlochgraben, S: Ziegelhüttengraben | View from the east of the summit region of the Mittelberg and its tx towers |
| Pferdskopf (50°29′27.4″N 9°55′14.3″E) | 874,9 | Wasserkuppenrhön; Hessian Rhön NP, Rhön BR | Rodholz, Obernhausen | FD | HE | Basalt crags; S: Lütter | Pferdskopf |

== Abbreviations ==
Key to the abbreviations used in the table:

Counties (using German car registration plate abbreviations):

- FD = Fulda
- HEF = Hersfeld-Rotenburg
- KG = Bad Kissingen
- MKK = Main-Kinzig-Kreis
- NES = Rhön-Grabfeld
- SM = Schmalkalden-Meiningen
- WAK = Wartburgkreis

States:

- BV = Bavaria
- HE = Hesse
- TH = Thuringia

Biosphere Reserve:

- Rhön BR = Rhön Biosphere Reserve

Nature parks:

- Bavarian Rhön NP = Bavarian Rhön Nature Park
- Hessian Rhön NP = Hessian Rhön Nature Park
- Hessian Spessart NP = Hessian Spessart Nature Park

Points of the compass:

- NW = Northwest
- SE = Southeast

Other:

- AT = Observation tower
- BR = Biosphere reserve
- Ex = former
- DDR = East Germany
- FVV = Fremdenverkehrsverein ("tourist association")
- Gr = Groß, Großer ("Great")
- Hk = Hauptkuppe ("main summit")
- KD = Cultural monument
- Kl = Klein, Kleiner ("Little")
- km^{2} = square kilometre
- ND = Natural monument
- NHN = Normalhöhennull (German elevation datum)
- Nk = Nebenkuppe ("subpeak")
- NP = Nature Park
- NSG = Nature reserve
- Q = Source
- RB = Regierungsbezirk ("province")
- TrÜbPl = Military training area
- v = von, vom
- Whs = Wirtshaus (pub, cafe, restaurant)
