= Mittelberg (Rhön) =

Mountain in Germany

Coordinates: 50°24′35″N 9°54′50″E

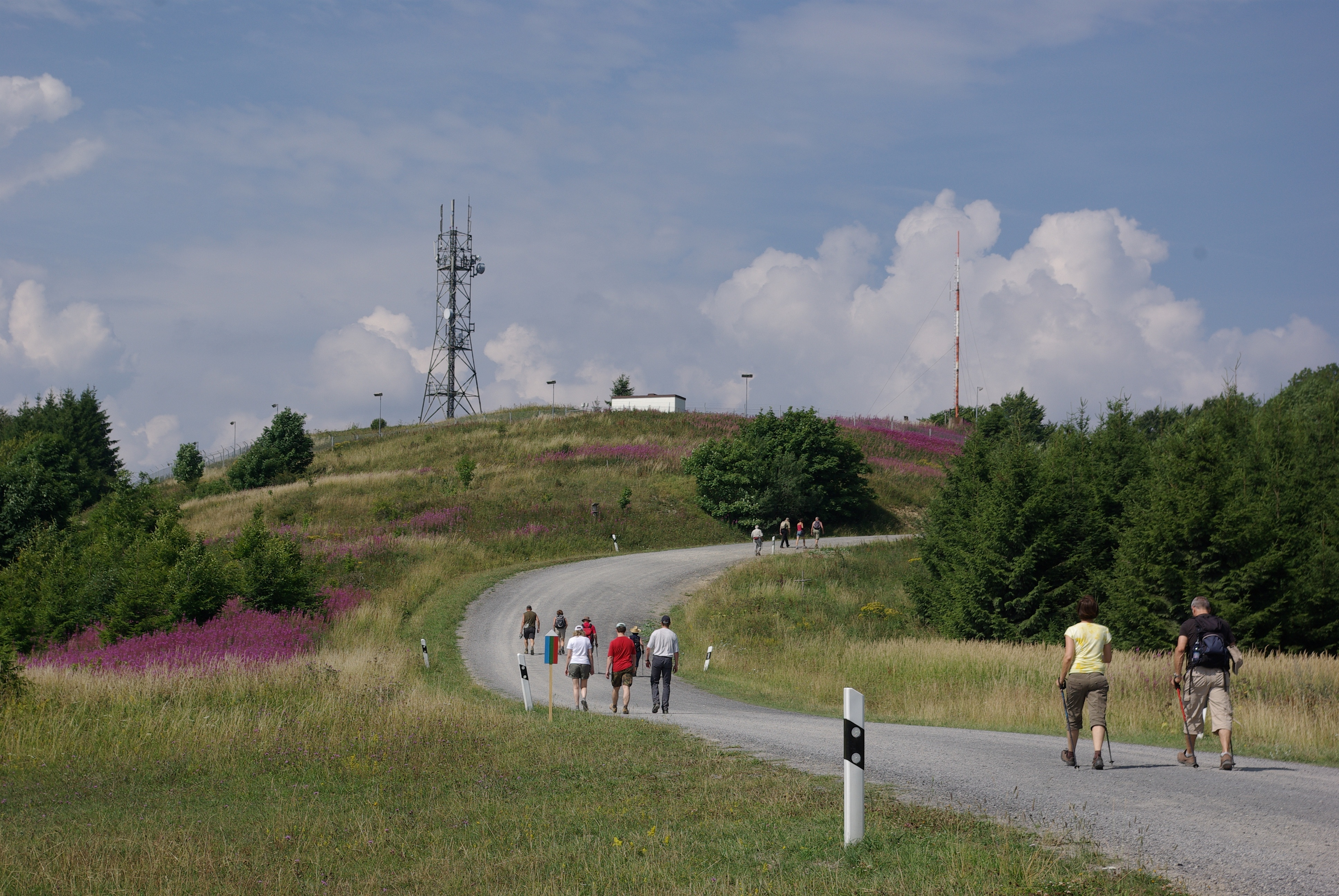
- The Western plateau of Mittelberg in the Rhön with antenna masts.

Highest point
- Elevation: 880 m (2,890 ft)

Geography
- Location: Bavaria, Germany

Mittelberg (German pronunciation: [ˈmɪtl̩bɛʁk]) is a mountain of Bavaria, Germany.

== Geography ==
=== Geographical Location ===
The Mittelberg rises as part of the "High Rhön" within the Wildflecken Military Training Area, which is surrounded by the Hessian Rhön and Bavarian Rhön nature parks, as well as the Rhön Biosphere Reserve. Its two mountain peaks are located on the border of the districts of Bad Kissingen (Franconia) and Fulda (Eastern Hesse).

The core of the town of Gersfeld (Rhön) (Hesse) lies approximately 4.7 km north of the Mittelberg, and that of the market town of Wildflecken (Bavaria) lies approximately 3.5 km south. On its northern slope is the deserted village of Kippelbach.

The Mittelberg has two hilltops: the larger western peak and the correspondingly smaller eastern peak, on which two transmission towers stand; they are approximately 165 m apart. Its foothills or neighboring mountains are (clockwise): Reesberg (Rhön) (861 m) in the north-northeast, Schachen (Rhön) (857 m) in the east, Arnsberg (843 m) and Kreuzberg (Rhön) (927.8 m) in the southeast, Zornberg (838 m) in the south, Eierhauckberg (909.9 m) in the southwest and Rommerser Berg (850.2 m) in the northwest [Height in meters above sea level] (NN)].

=== Watershed ===
Part of the Rhine-Weser watershed runs across the Mittelberg. Rivers flowing south from the mountain flow via the Sinn, Franconian Saale, and Main into the Rhine, and the water of those streams draining northward flows via Schmalnau (called Rommerser Wasser in its upper and middle reaches) and the Fulda into the Weser.
