= Nordheim vor der Rhön =

Nordheim v.d.Rhön
- Municipality
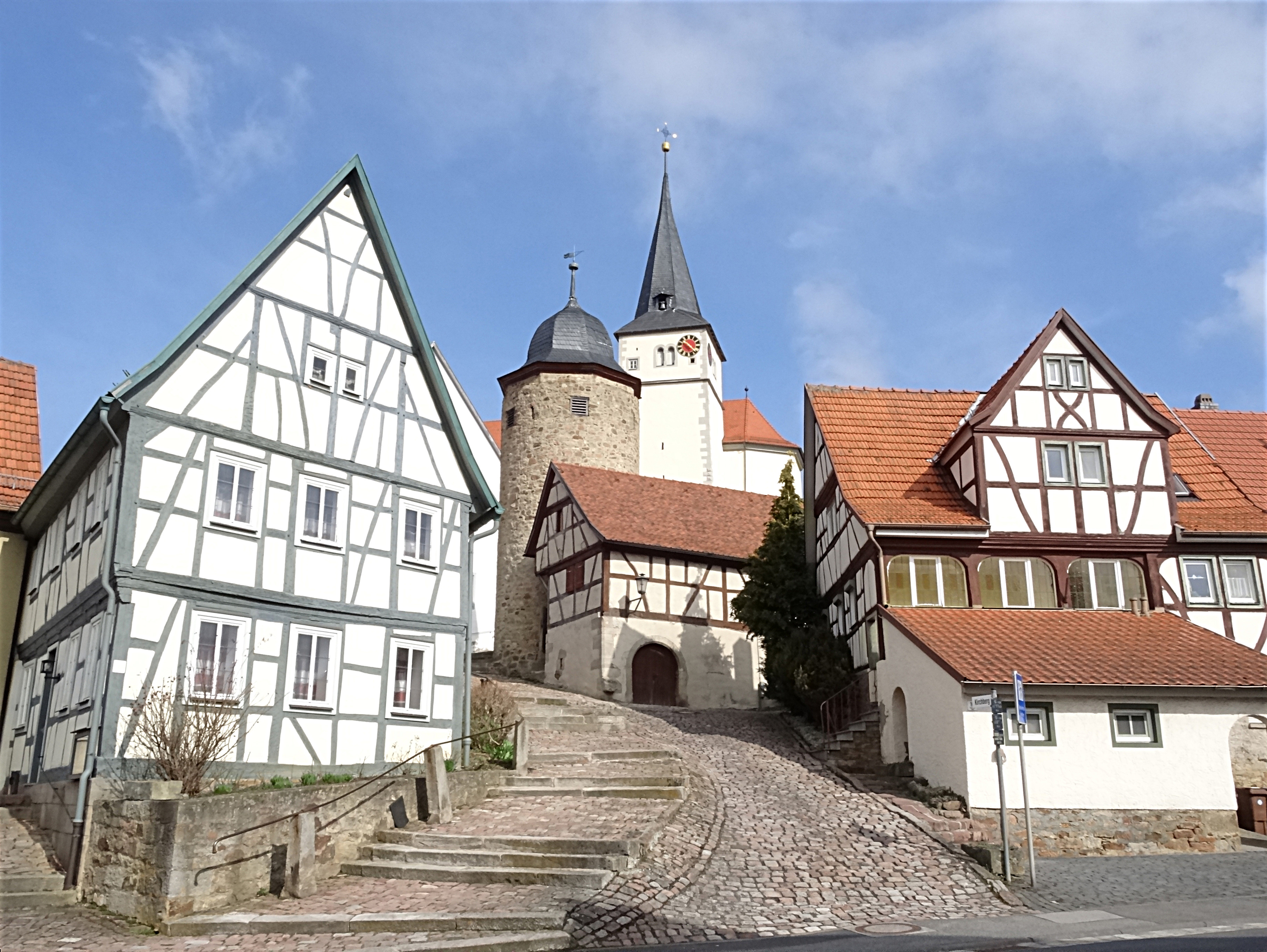
- Town center with the Church of Saint John the Baptist

- Coat of arms

- Location of Nordheim v.d.Rhön within Rhön-Grabfeld district
- Interactive map of Nordheim v.d.Rhön
- Location within Germany Location within Bavaria
- Coordinates: 50°29′N 10°11′E
- Country: Germany
- State: Bavaria
- Admin. region: Unterfranken
- District: Rhön-Grabfeld
- Municipal assoc.: Fladungen

Government
  - Mayor (2020–26): Thomas Fischer (CSU)

Area
  - Total: 16.56 km^{2} (6.39 sq mi)
- Elevation: 340 m (1,120 ft)

Population (2025-12-31)
  - Total: 1,046
  - Density: 63.16/km^{2} (163.6/sq mi)
- Time zone: UTC+01:00 (CET)
  - Summer (DST): UTC+02:00 (CEST)
- Postal codes: 97647
- Dialling codes: 09779
- Vehicle registration: NES
- Website: www.rhoen-saale.net

Nordheim vor der Rhön is a municipality in the district of Rhön-Grabfeld in Bavaria in Germany. It is located in the upper Streu valley, between Ostheim and Fladungen.

== People ==
- Franz Georg Benkert (25 September 1790 – 20 May 1859), German Roman Catholic theologian and historical writer
