= Rückers =

- Village of Flieden
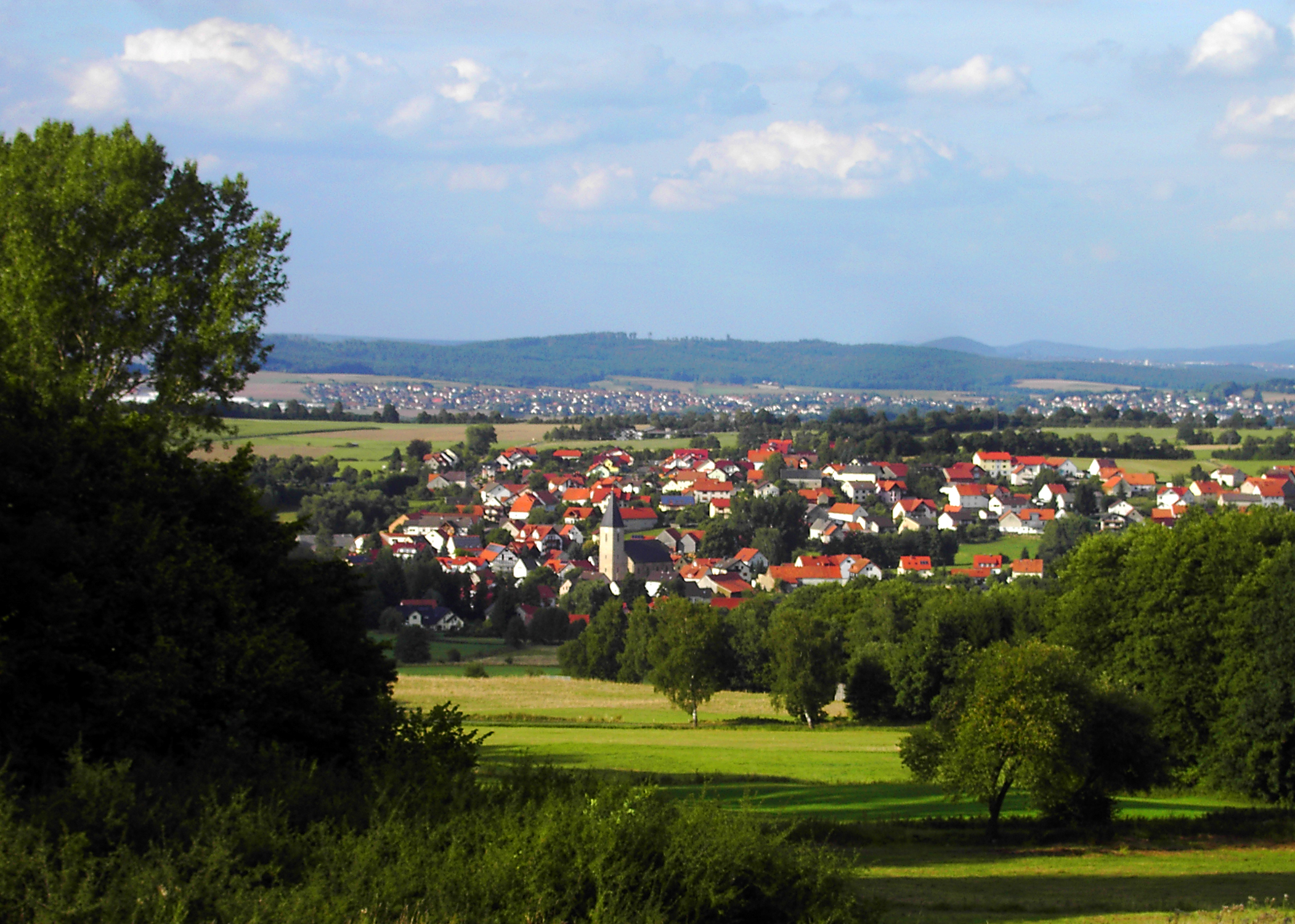
- Interactive map of Rückers
- Location within Germany Location within Hesse
- Coordinates: 50°24′N 09°34′E
- Country: Germany
- State: Hesse
- Admin. region: Kassel
- District: Fulda
- Town: Flieden
- Elevation: 330 m (1,080 ft)

Population (2020)
  - Total: 1,747
- Time zone: UTC+01:00 (CET)
  - Summer (DST): UTC+02:00 (CEST)
- Postal codes: 36103
- Dialling codes: 0 66 55
- Vehicle registration: FD

Rückers is a village in the municipality of Flieden, in the district of Fulda, in Hesse, Germany.

== Geography ==
Rückers is situated in the south of the district of Fulda, approx. 20 km south of the town Fulda, on the gently sliding northern slope of a low mountain range between Rhön and Vogelsberg Mountains called Landrücken.

== Waters and Source Areas ==
The following streams flow through the Rückers district: the Hermannswasser, the Elmer Wasser, the Kesbach, the Struther Wasser, the Arzbach and the Kressenwasser.

== Drainage divide ==
South of Rückers, across the Breitefeld (Hessischer Landrücken)| and the Steinkammer (Hessischer Landrücken)| runs one of the most important watersheds in Germany, the Rhine-Weser watershed. It is the boundary of the catchment areas of the major rivers, the Rhine and Weser. Northerly waters, such as the rivers from Rückers, drain into the Weser, while southerly waters drain into the Rhine.

== Neighboring localities ==
Rückers borders in the north-east the village of Schweben, in the south-east the village of Hutten, in the south the village of Elm, in the south-west the village of Klosterhöfe, in the west the village of Höf und Haid and in the north-west the village of Flieden.

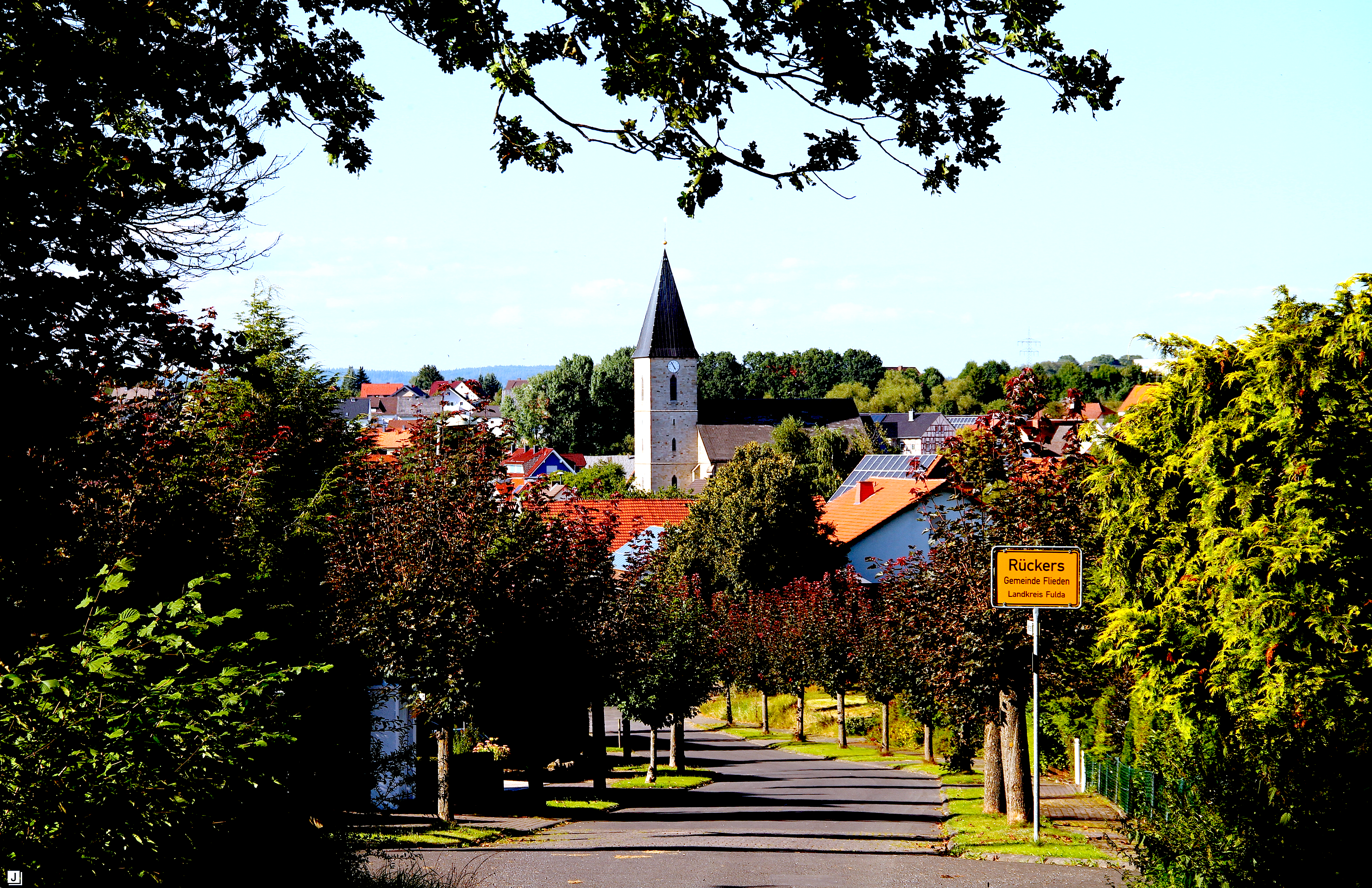
Village of Rückers

== History ==
Dolmens found at the foot of the Steinkammer give testimony that people already lived here already in ancient times. The founding of Rückers is expected around the time of Charlemagne. In a written document, Rückers is mentioned for the first time around the year of 1160.

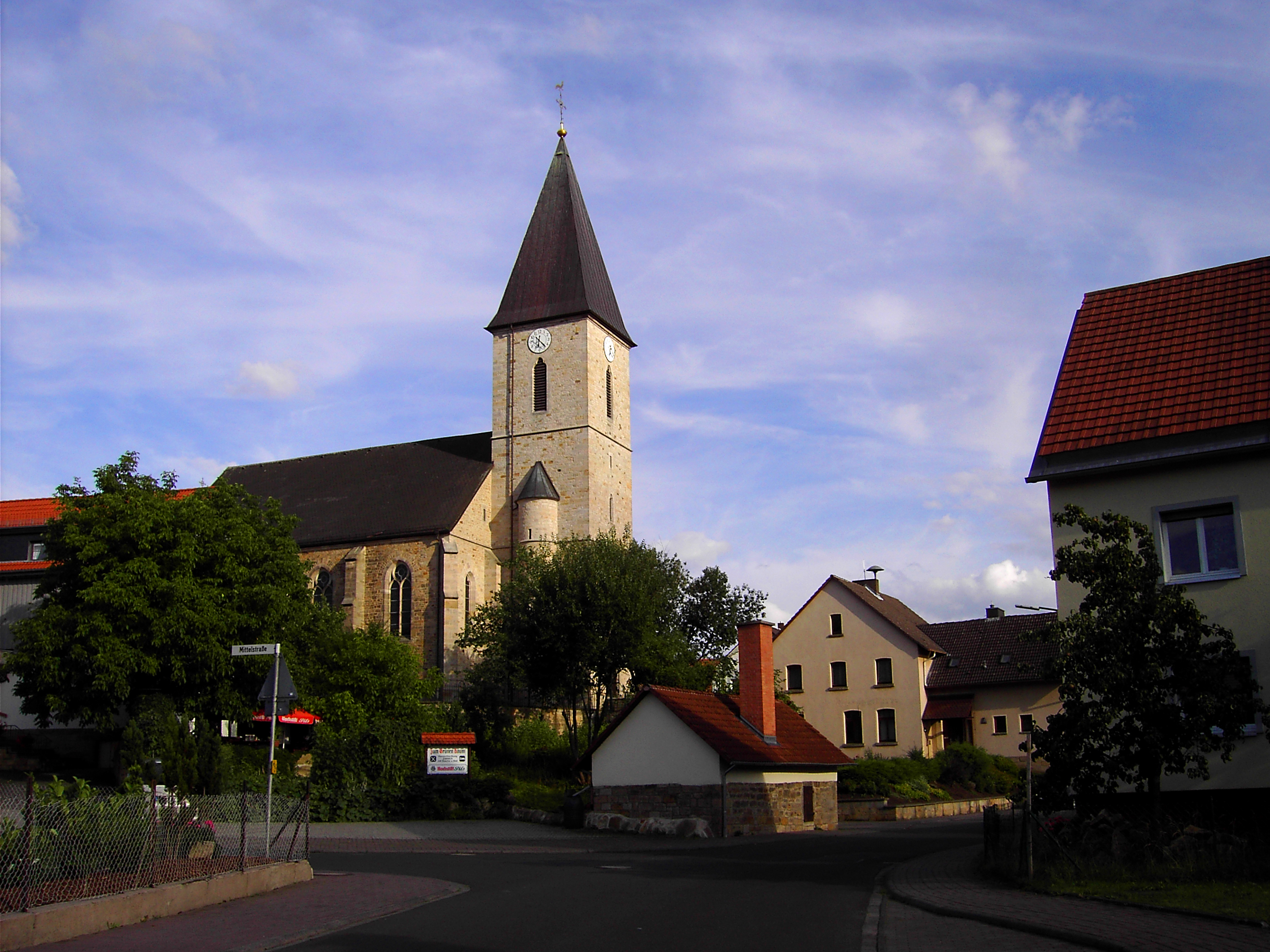
Catholic Church "Mariae Himmelfahrt" in Rückers

== Religion ==
A Catholic Pilgrimage church Mariä Himmelfahrt is situated in Rückers. The previously independent parish church "Assumption of Mary" in Rückers has been a Filial church of the newly founded Catholic Church congregation "Christ the King", Flieden, since 1 January 2021.

== Education ==
A kindergarten named St. Nikolaus and a Grundschule (elementary school) Steinkammerschule are in Rückers.

== Sites of interest ==
The headwater and local recreation area Steinkammer located on the low mountain range Landrücken serves vacationers and hikers a superb view to the mountains of Rhön, Vogelsberg and Spessart. The area of Steinkammer is a protected landscape area in the Hessian Rhön Nature Park, bordering the Spessart Nature Park, with geological and biological importance.

== Transportation ==
=== Motorway ===
- Bundesautobahn 66

=== Railway lines ===
- Line Bebra – Fulda – Frankfurt am Main
- Line Flieden – Gemünden

=== Long-distance cycle route ===
The Hessian Long-Distance Cycle Route R3 runs through the district. The approximately 240-kilometer-long long-distance cycle route begins in Rüdesheim am Rhein and leads via Fulda to Tann in the Rhön.

=== Way of St. James ===
The 125 km long "Ecumenical Way of St. James" runs through Rückers from Fulda to the Main River. The route leads from Flieden to Rückers, up to the Steinkammer and the Breite Feld, across the Distelrasen, and down to Schlüchtern. The pilgrimage route is part of the Via Regia network, whose network of paths stretched from Ukraine to Spain.

== Notable people ==
- Renate Gärtner (* 1952) a multiple German champion in the women's high jump and Olympic participant at the 1972 Summer Olympics in Munich, grew up here.
- Tobias Sammet(*1977) a German musician, songwriter, and music producer, singer and primary songwriter of the power metal band Edguy, and founder of the metal opera project Avantasia, grew up here.

== Gallery ==
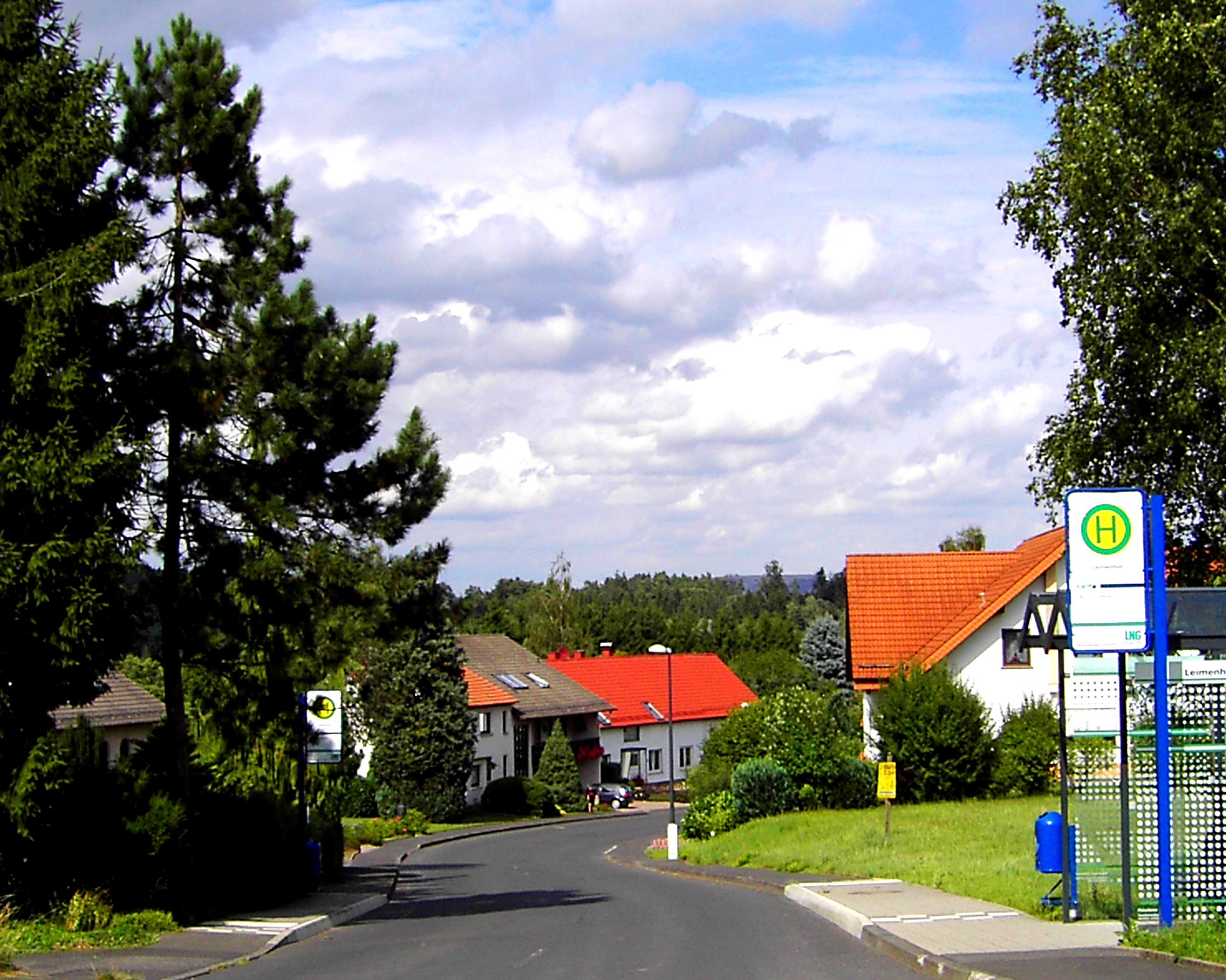
Leimenhof

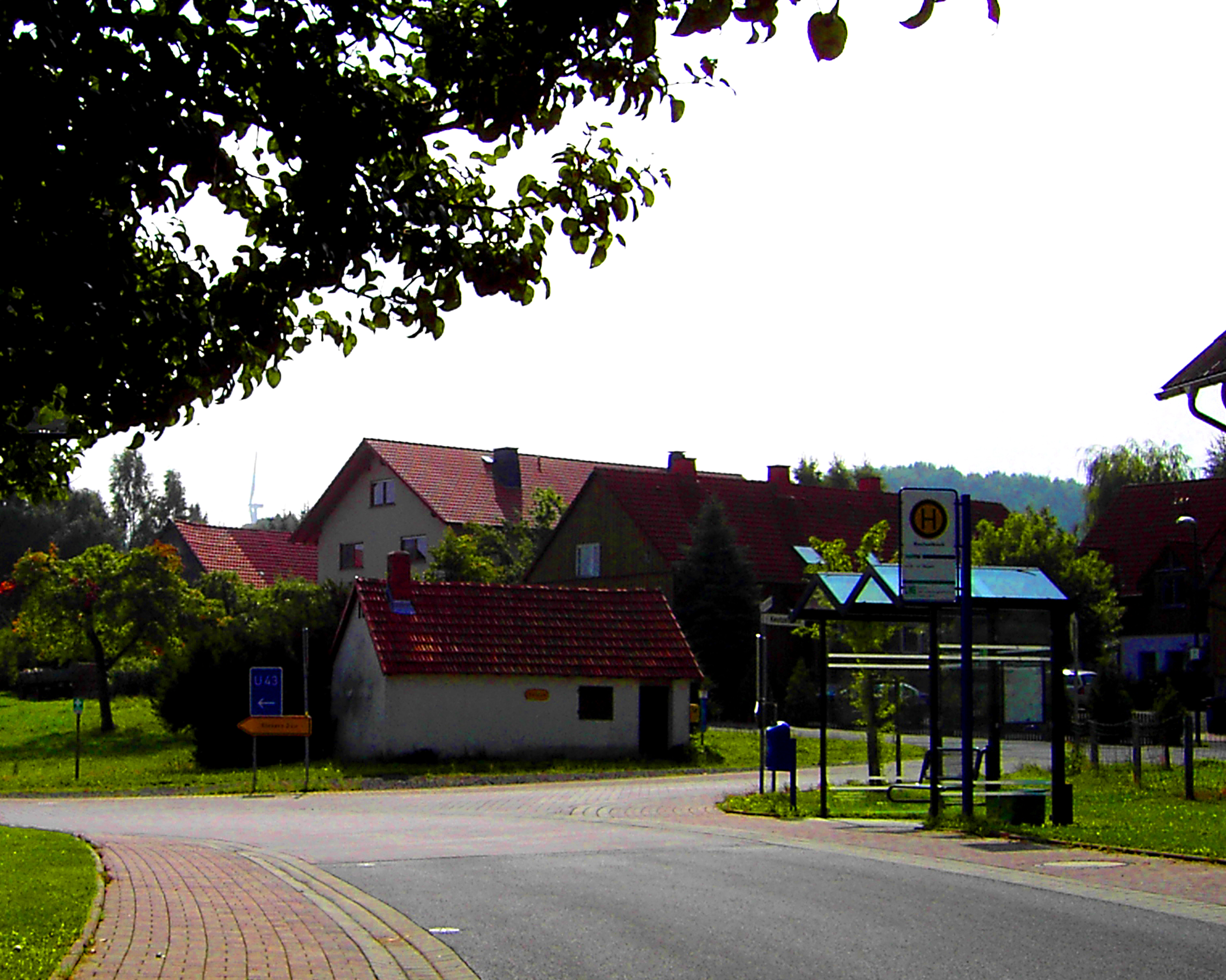
Keutzelbuch

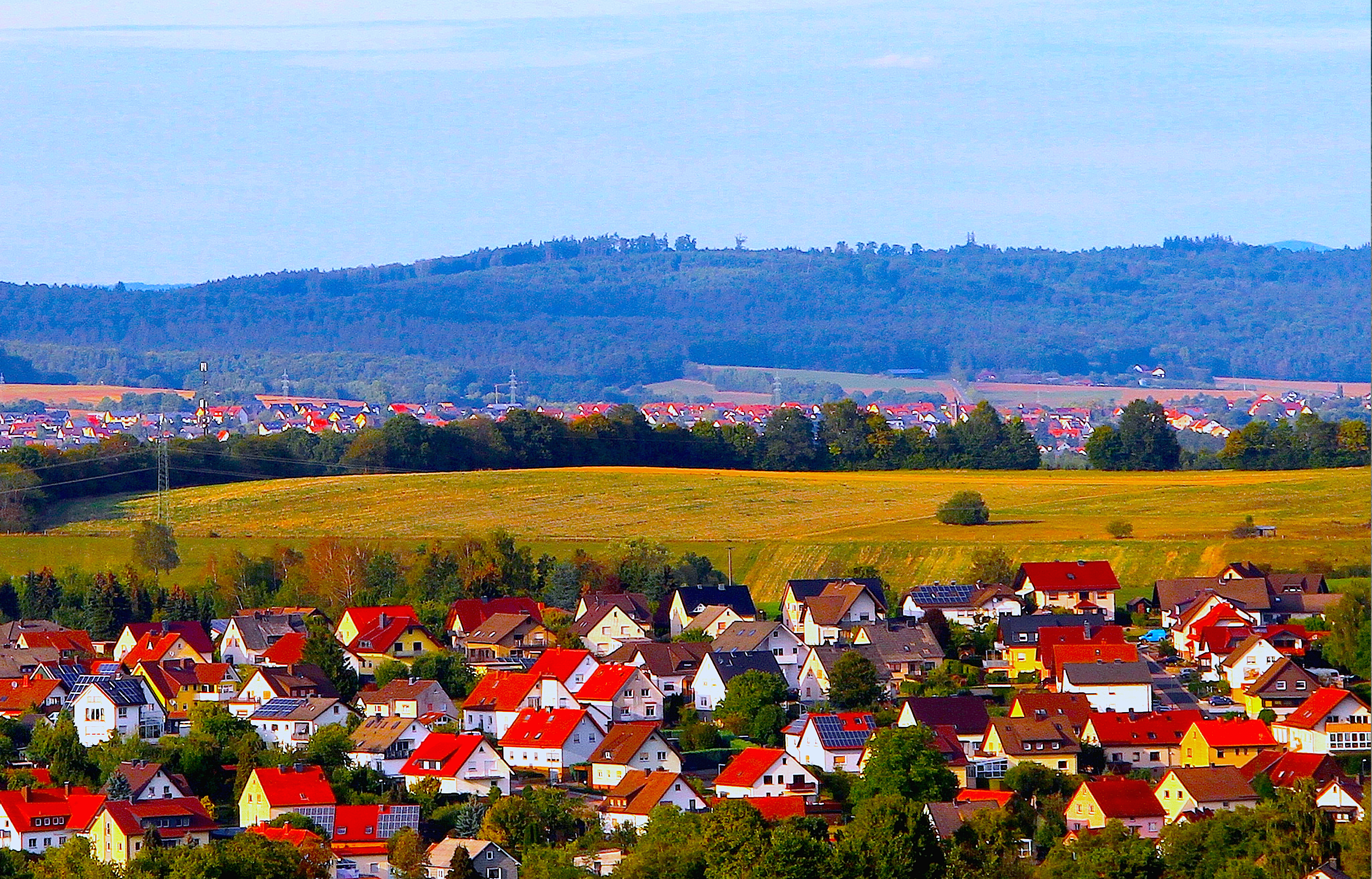
Rückers-Eckenheim

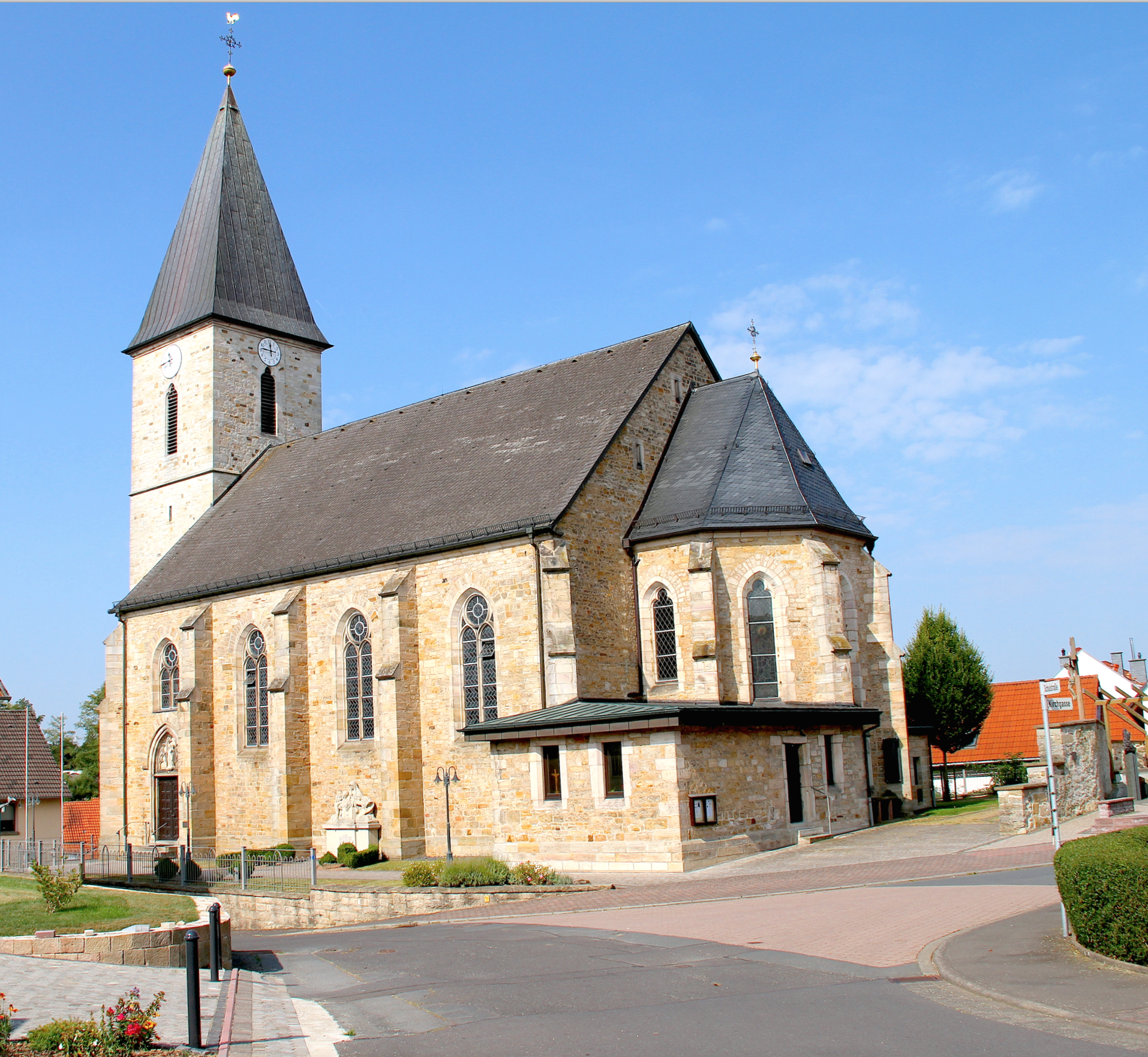
Wallfahrtskirche „Mariä Himmelfahrt“ in Rückers

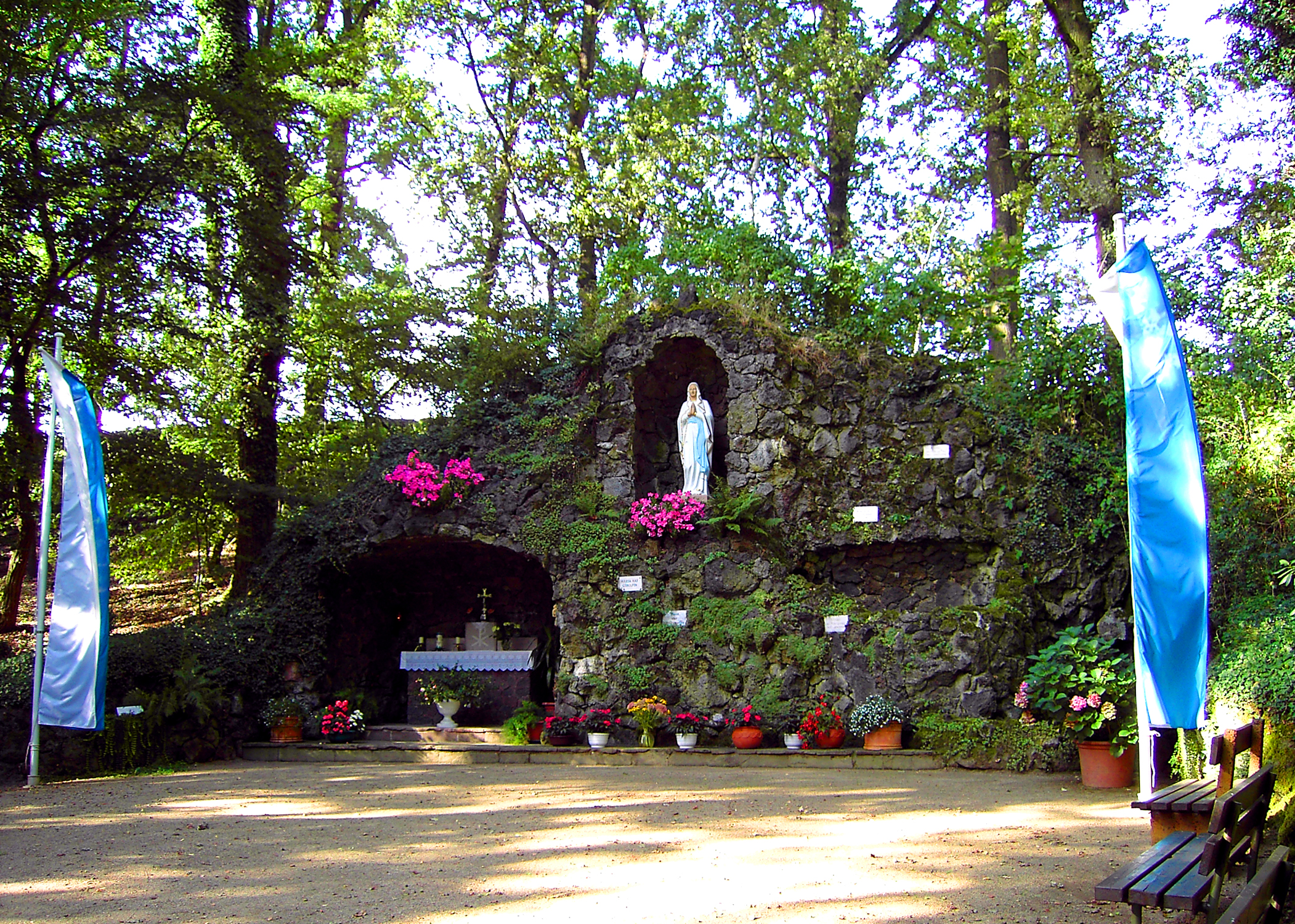
Mariengrotte in Rückers

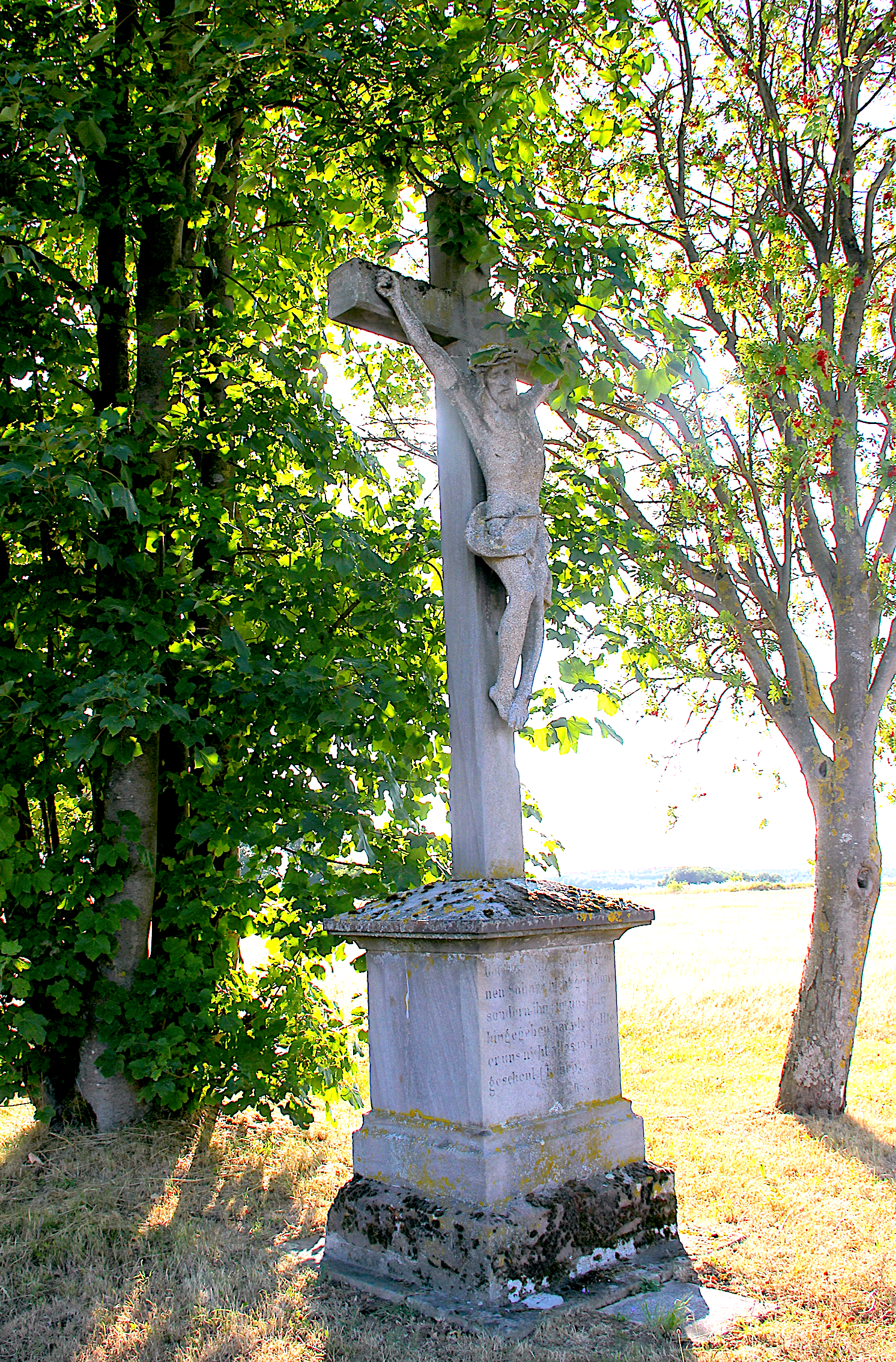
"Rotes Kreuz" in Rückers

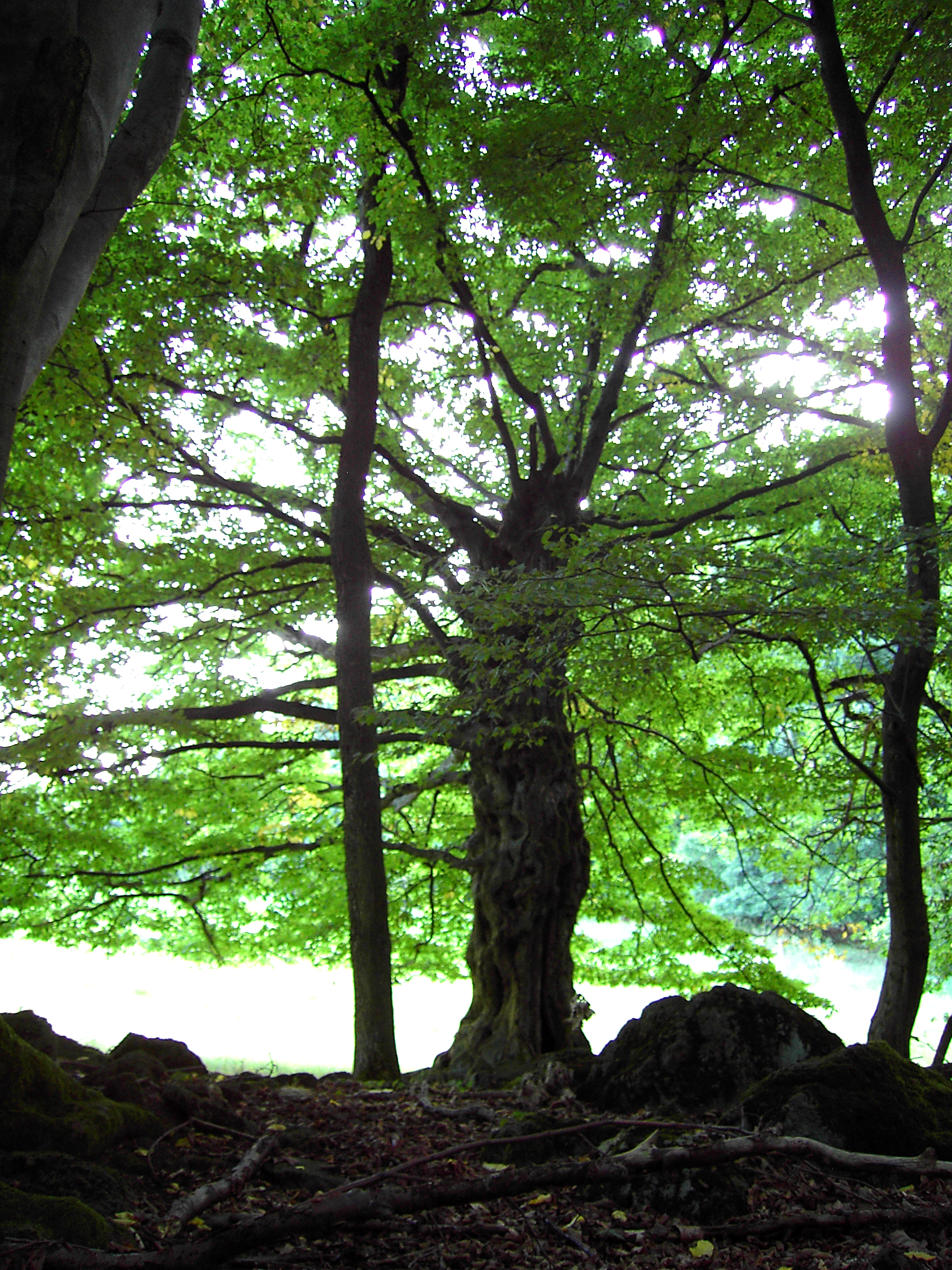
Natural monument in Rückers (Hessian Rhön Nature Park)

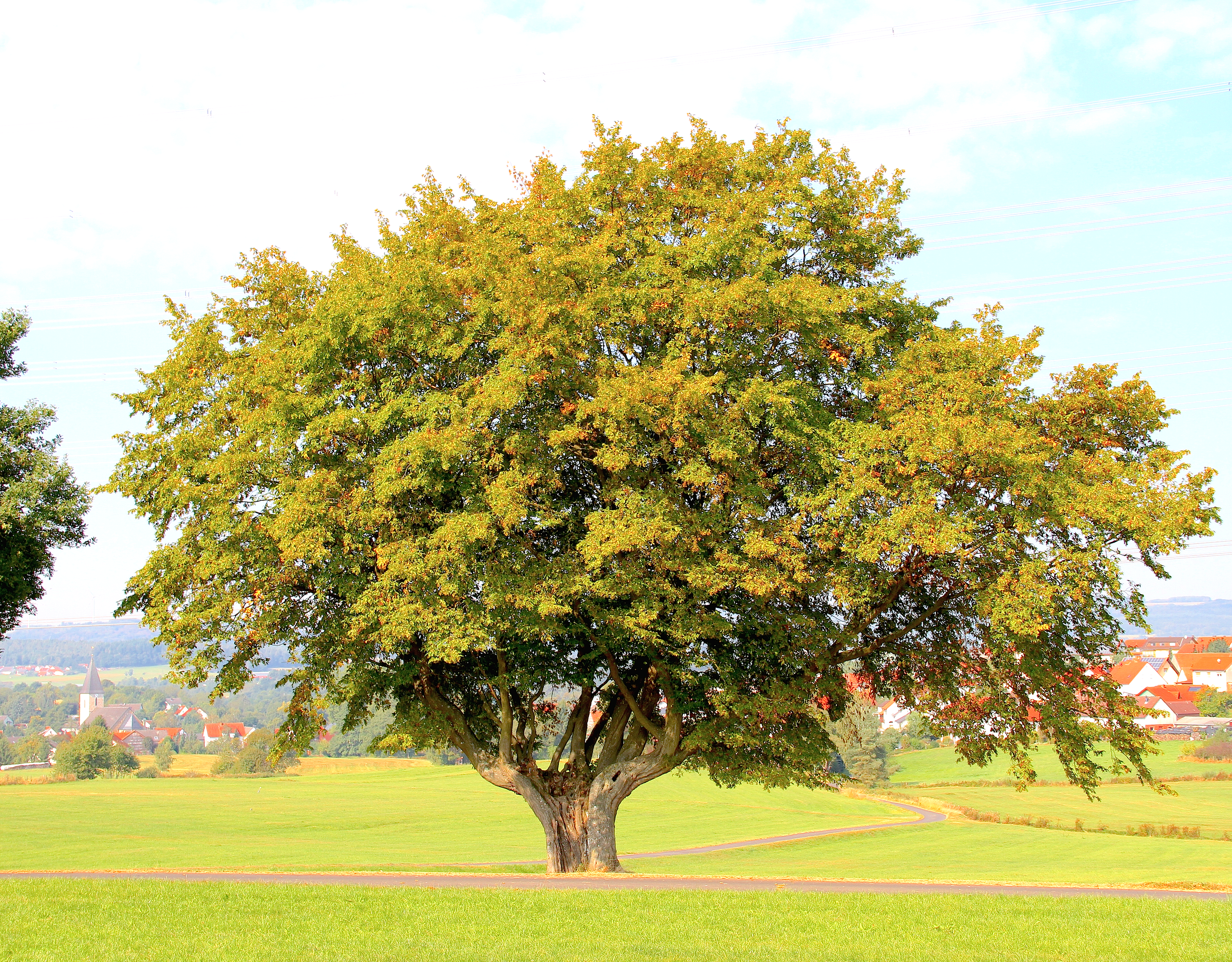
The "Blitzbaum" in Rückers (lightning-damaged tree)

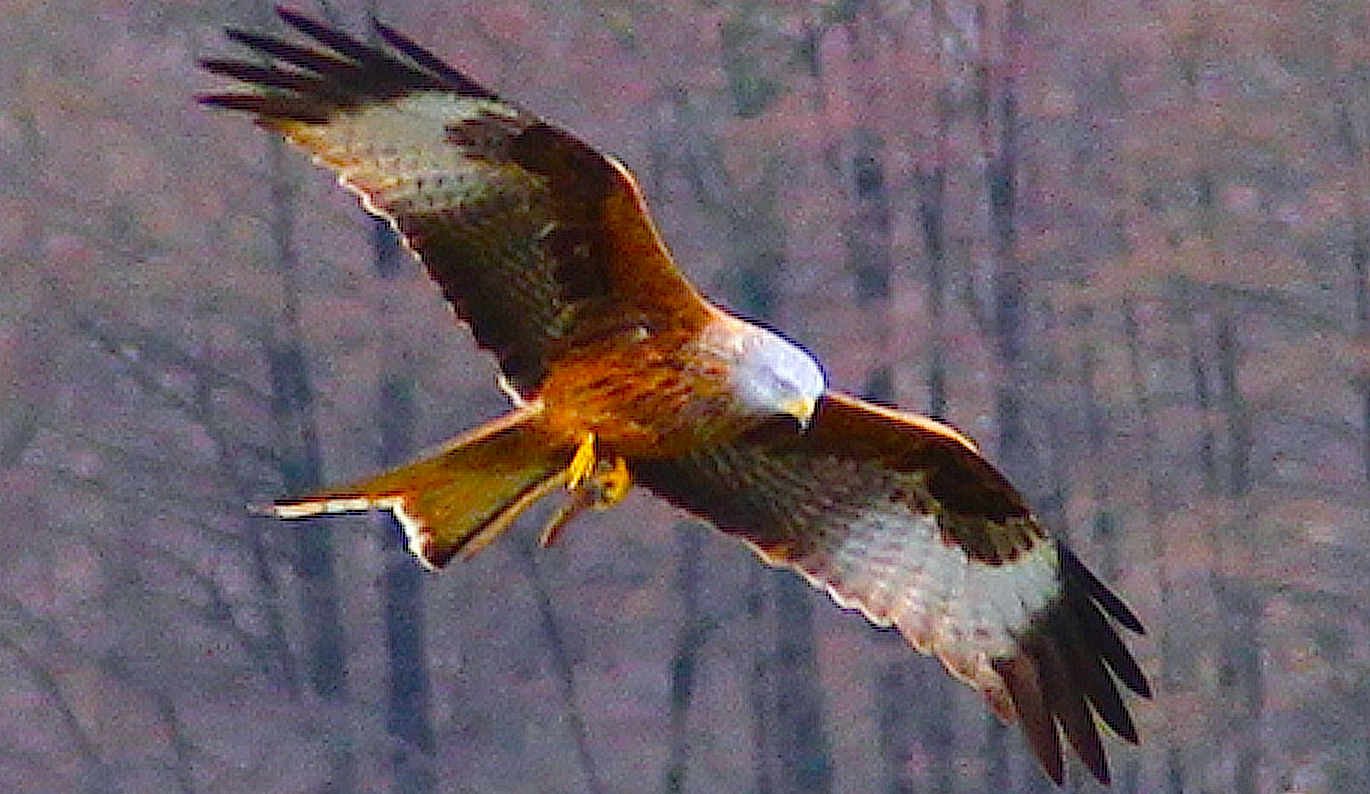
Red kite in Rückers (Hessian Rhön Nature Park)

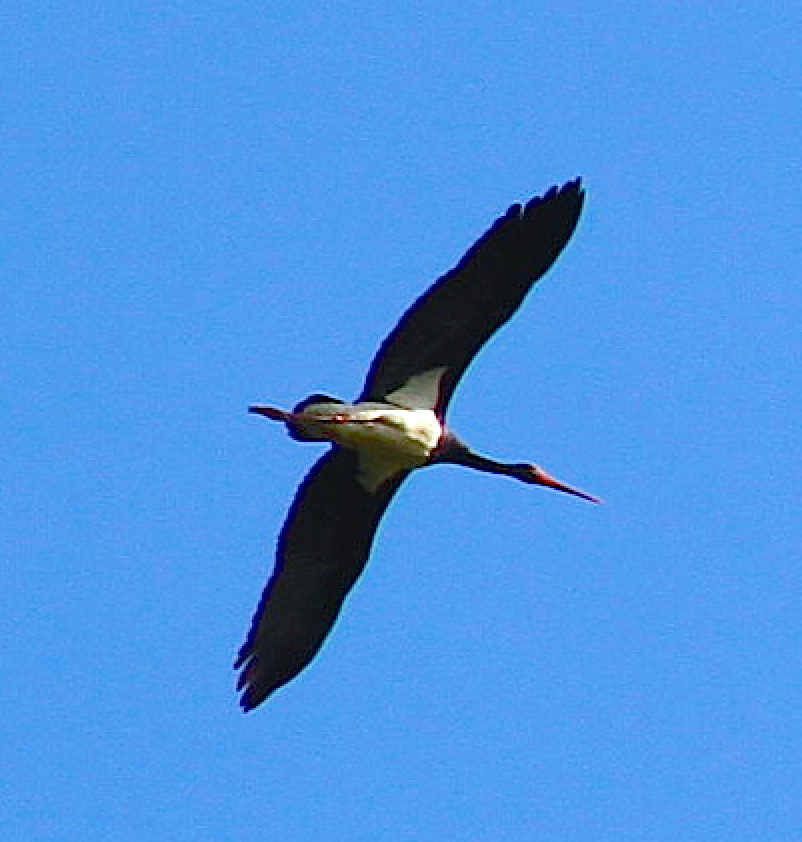
Black stork in Rückers (Hessian Rhön Nature Park)
