= Benkert =

Benkert is a surname of German origin. Notable people with this surname include:

- Franz Georg Benkert (1790–1859), German Roman Catholic theologian and historical writer
- Heinie Benkert (1901–1972), American football player
- Joseph Benkert, United States Naval officer and George W. Bush administration official
- Karl-Maria Benkert, a.k.a. Karl-Maria Kertbeny (1824–1882) Austrian-born Hungarian journalist, memoirist and human rights campaigner, coiner of "homosexual"
- Kurt Benkert (born 1995), American football player

== See also ==
- Benckert
