= Hausen, Rhön-Grabfeld =

Hausen
- Municipality
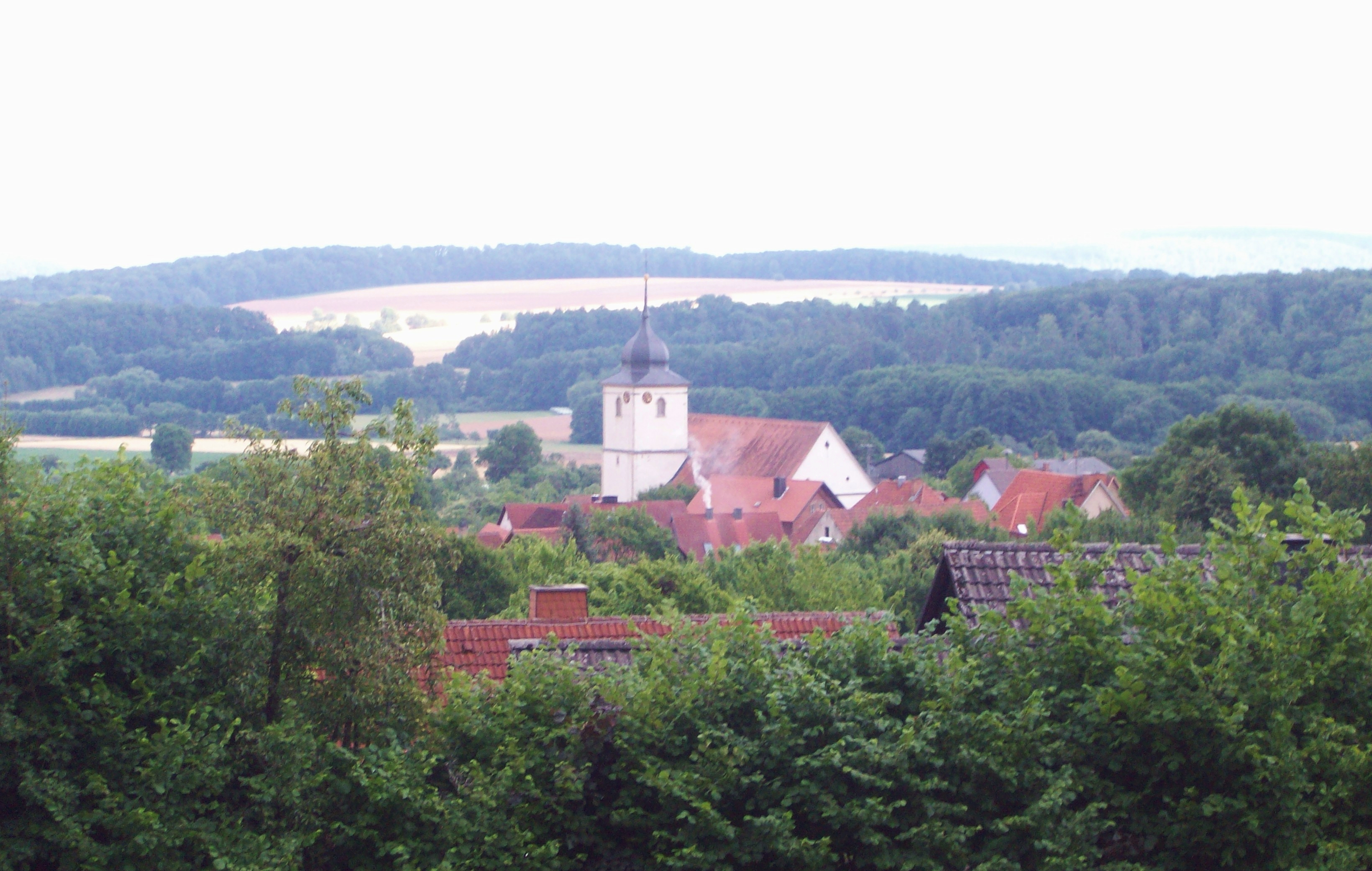
- Church of Saint George

- Coat of arms

- Location of Hausen within Rhön-Grabfeld district
- Interactive map of Hausen
- Location within Germany Location within Bavaria
- Coordinates: 50°30′20″N 10°7′30″E
- Country: Germany
- State: Bavaria
- Admin. region: Unterfranken
- District: Rhön-Grabfeld
- Municipal assoc.: Fladungen

Government
  - Mayor (2020–26): Friedolin Link (CSU)

Area
  - Total: 24.23 km^{2} (9.36 sq mi)
- Elevation: 444 m (1,457 ft)

Population (2025-12-31)
  - Total: 687
  - Density: 28.4/km^{2} (73.4/sq mi)
- Time zone: UTC+01:00 (CET)
  - Summer (DST): UTC+02:00 (CEST)
- Postal codes: 97647
- Dialling codes: 09778
- Vehicle registration: NES
- Website: www.hausen.rhoen-saale.net

Hausen (German pronunciation: [ˈhaʊzn̩]) is a municipality in the district of Rhön-Grabfeld in Bavaria in Germany.
