= Fladungen (Verwaltungsgemeinschaft) =

- Verwaltungsgemeinschaft
- Location of Fladungen within Rhön-Grabfeld district
- Interactive map of Fladungen
- Location within Germany Location within Bavaria
- Coordinates: 50°31′N 10°09′E
- Country: Germany
- State: Bavaria
- Admin. region: Lower Franconia
- District: Rhön-Grabfeld
- Seat: Fladungen
- Subdivisions: 3 municipalities

Area
  - Total: 87.13 km^{2} (33.64 sq mi)

Population (2025-12-31)
  - Total: 3,797
  - Density: 43.58/km^{2} (112.9/sq mi)
- Time zone: UTC+01:00 (CET)
  - Summer (DST): UTC+02:00 (CEST)
- Website: www.fladungen-vgem.de

Fladungen is a Verwaltungsgemeinschaft (municipal association) in the district Rhön-Grabfeld in Bavaria, Germany. Its seat is in Fladungen.

It consists of the following municipalities:

1. Fladungen
2. Hausen
3. Nordheim vor der Rhön
