= Benckert =

Benckert is a surname. Notable people with the surname include:

- Curt Benckert (1887–1950), Swedish tennis player
- Vicki Benckert (born 1960), Swedish pop singer

== See also ==
- 35229 Benckert
- Benkert
