= Fladungen =

- Town
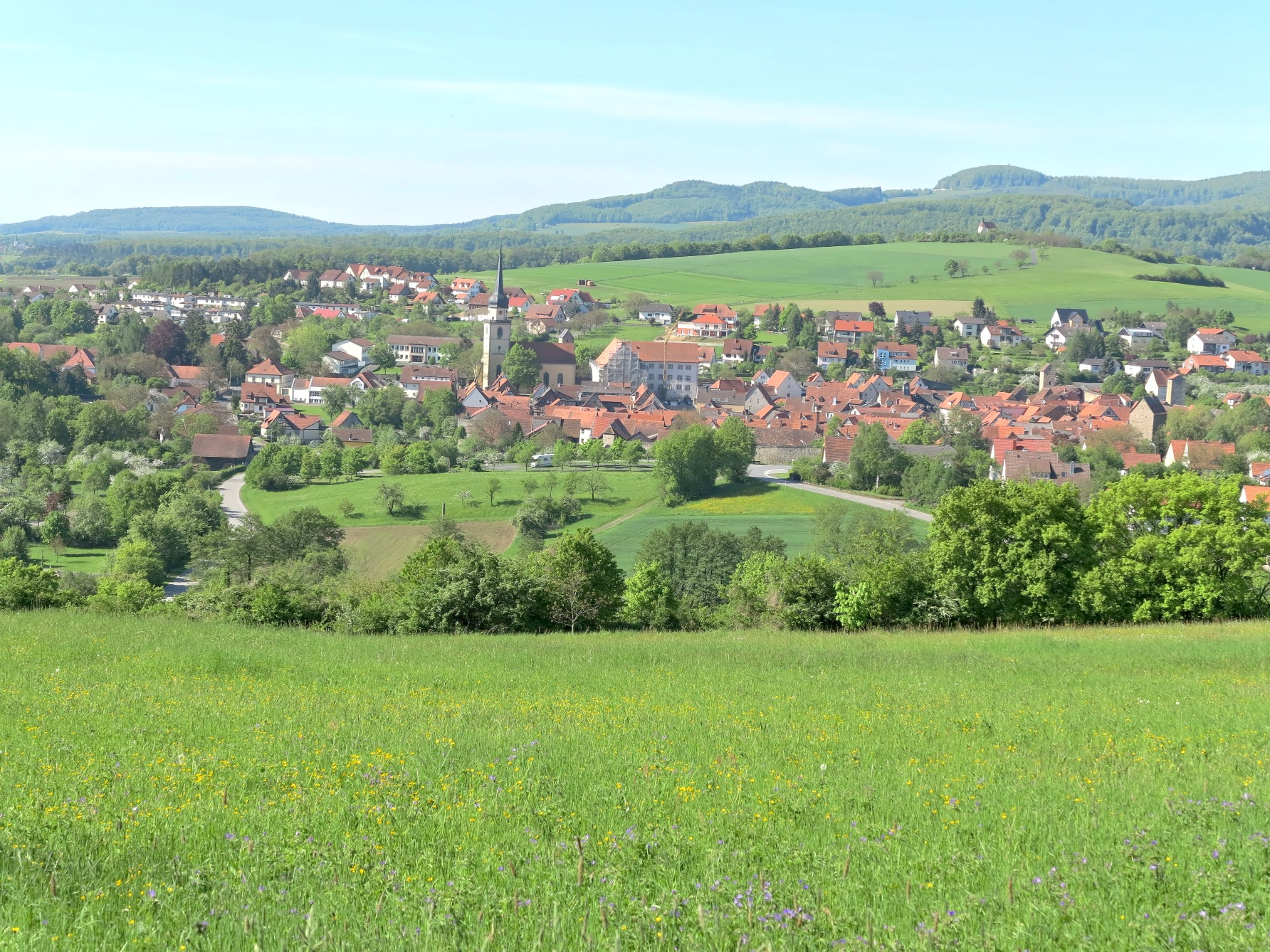
- Fladungen seen from the east

- Coat of arms

- Location of Fladungen within Rhön-Grabfeld district
- Interactive map of Fladungen
- Location within Germany Location within Bavaria
- Coordinates: 50°31′16″N 10°8′43″E
- Country: Germany
- State: Bavaria
- Admin. region: Unterfranken
- District: Rhön-Grabfeld
- Municipal assoc.: Fladungen
- Subdivisions: 7Stadtteile

Government
  - Mayor (2020–26): Michael Schnupp

Area
  - Total: 46.34 km^{2} (17.89 sq mi)
- Elevation: 414 m (1,358 ft)

Population (2025-12-31)
  - Total: 2,064
  - Density: 44.54/km^{2} (115.4/sq mi)
- Time zone: UTC+01:00 (CET)
  - Summer (DST): UTC+02:00 (CEST)
- Postal codes: 97650
- Dialling codes: 09778
- Vehicle registration: NES
- Website: www.fladungen.de

Fladungen (German pronunciation: [ˈflaːdʊŋən]) is a town in the Rhön-Grabfeld district, in Bavaria, Germany. It is situated in the Rhön Mountains, 11 km northwest of Ostheim, 20 km west of Meiningen, and 33 km east of Fulda. It is the northernmost town in Bavaria, bordering Hesse to the northwest and Thuringia to the northeast.

Fladungen lies at the southern edge of the Rhön Mountains, and the Rhön Biosphere Reserve begins a few kilometers outside of town. It is at the head of the river Streu, which flows southeast through it to join the Franconian Saale near Bad Neustadt. The region around the town is popular for hiking and cycling, especially in the summer and early autumn.

The town is a service center for the surrounding agricultural region. There are also some small industries, including a cement factory and a biogas plant. The 2021 population was estimated at 2,200.

== History ==
Fladungen first appears in a public record in 789 AD; the town was granted "Stadtrechte" (city rights) by Louis IV, Holy Roman Emperor, in 1335. From the 16th century onwards it was part of the Prince-Bishopric of Würzburg; the town coat of arms still shows the figure of a bishop with a sword and crozier, symbolizing the Prince-Bishop's combination of religious and secular power. The region around Fladungen was religiously contested during the Reformation, the Counter-Reformation and the Thirty Years War, but ultimately the town became predominantly Catholic, and remains so today.

Fladungen became part of the Kingdom of Bavaria after the Treaty of Paris in 1814. From the 18th to the mid-20th century, Fladungen was the primary market town for the Franconian Rhön, a relatively rural and underpopulated region whose economy was dominated by agriculture, sheep-herding and timber. During the Cold War, the border with East Germany ran through the hills around Fladungen, and the town was cut off from much of its traditional hinterland. (A portion of the old border fence has been preserved as a memorial in the Rhön-Biosphere park, a few kilometers north of the town.)

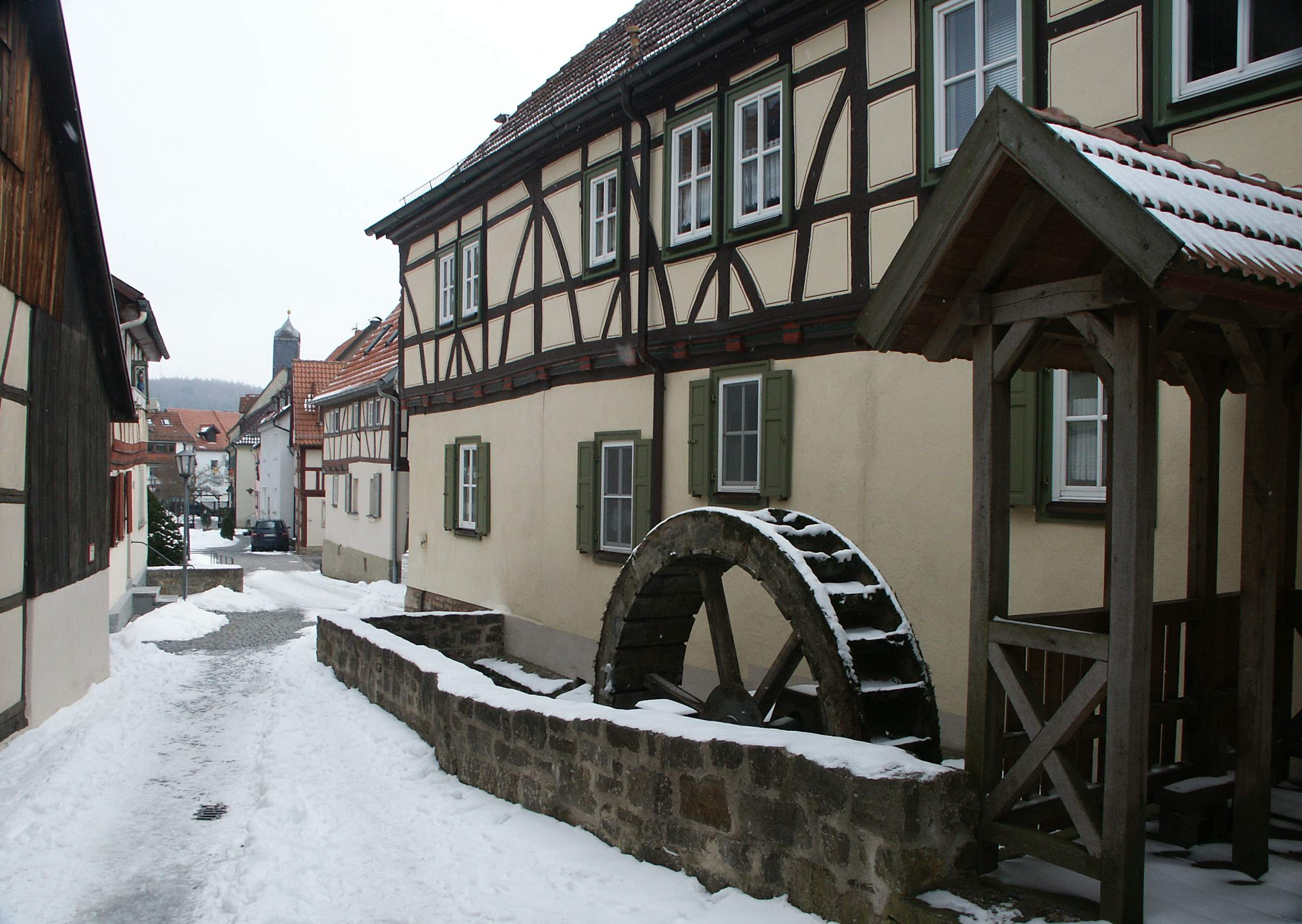
Old mill in Fladungen center

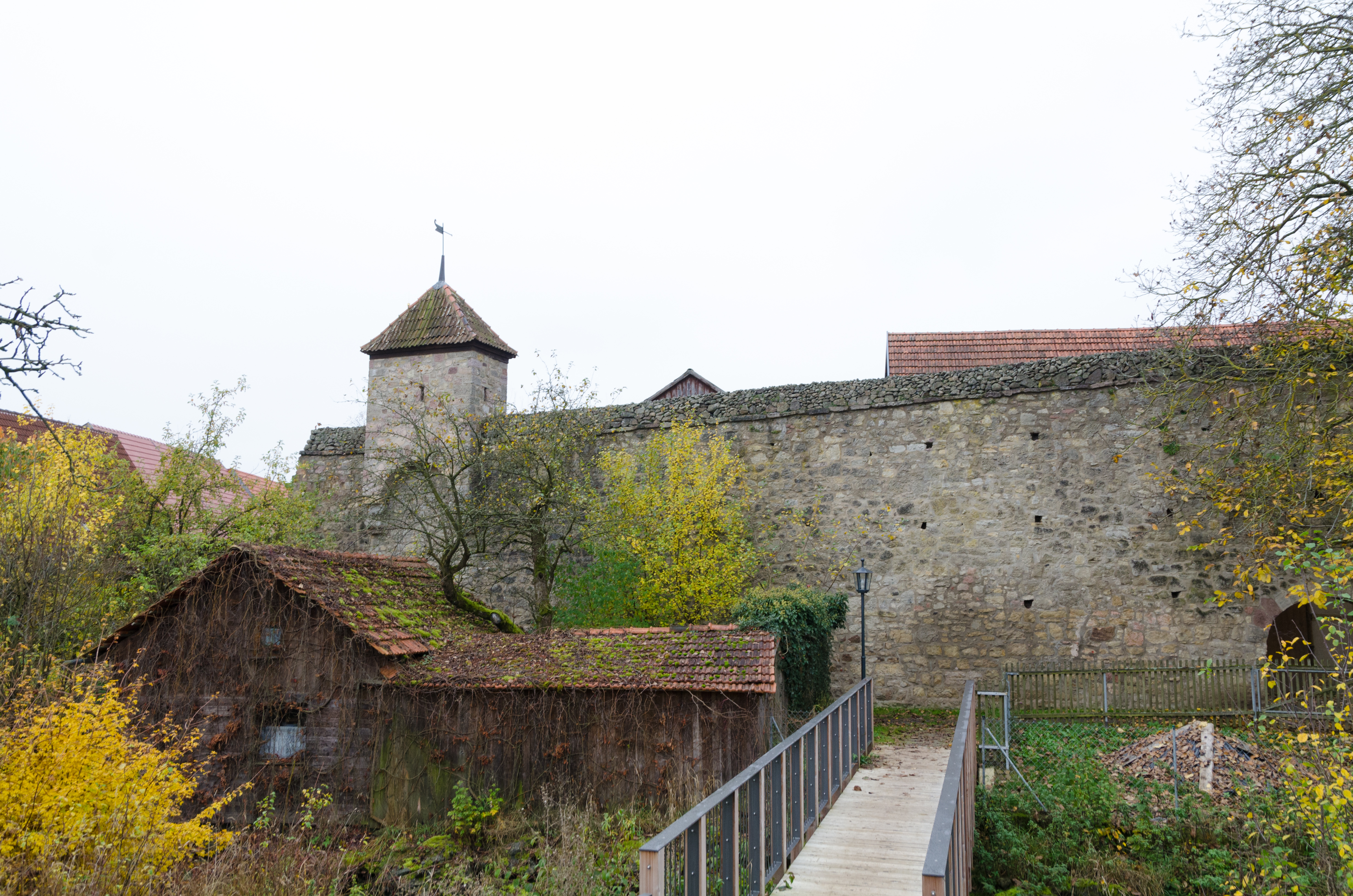
Fladungen City wall

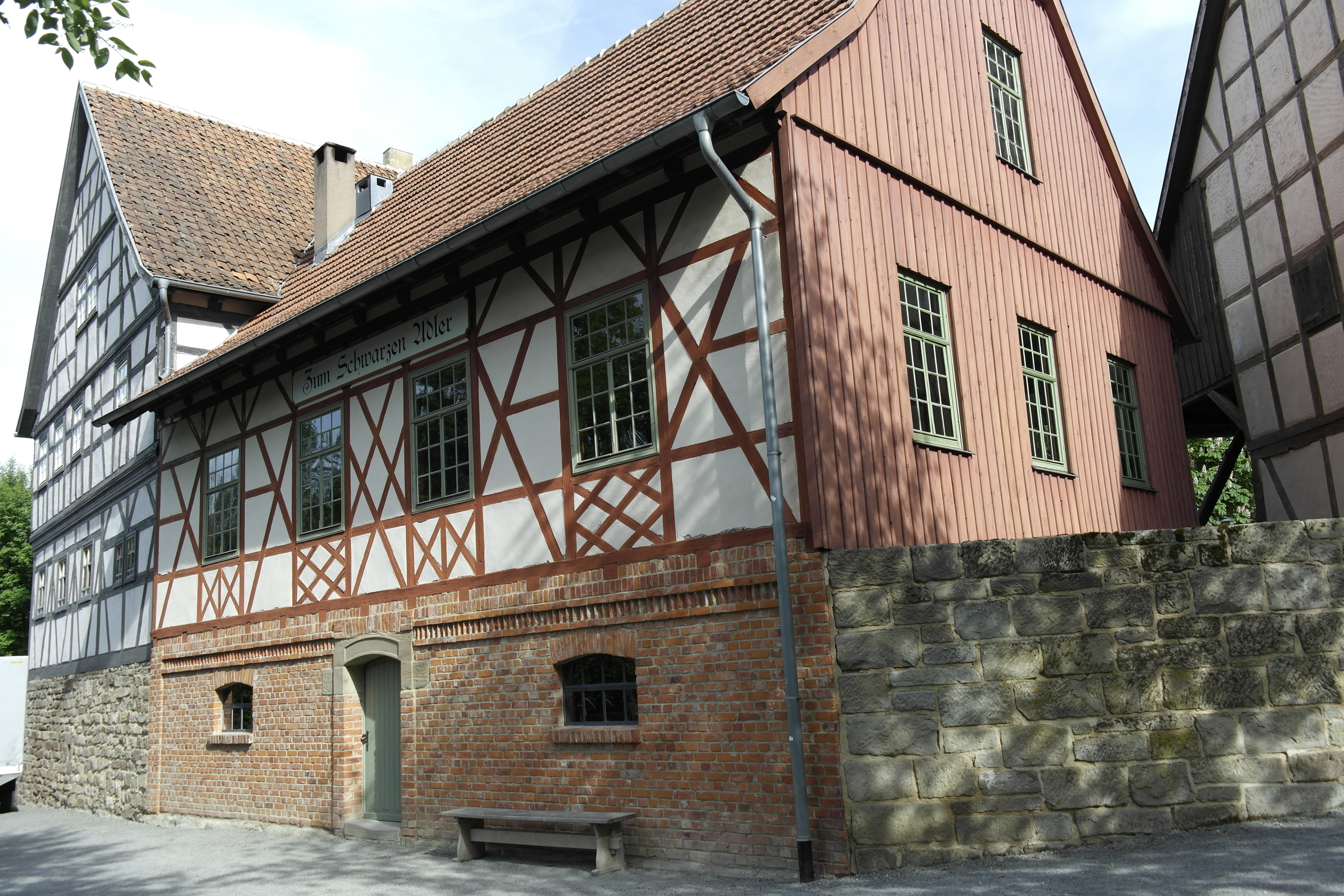
Franconian Open air museum Fladungen

== City Council (Stadtrat) ==
The municipal elections in Bavaria in March 2020 led to the following composition of the city council:

- CSU: 14.4%=2 seats
- Free voters: 23.4%=3 seats
- Voters block districts (Wählerblock Ortsteile): 21%=3 seats
- Leubach area (Leubach list): 13.6%=2 seats
- Neue Liste 20: 27.6%=4 seats

== Mayors ==
- 1968-1996: Raimund Goldbach
- 1996-2002: Herbert Ditzel
- 2002: Mischa Schmitt
- 2002-2014Robert Müller
- 2014-2020: Agathe Heuser-Panten
- since March 2020: Michael Schnupp

== Main sights ==
Fladungen is noted for the "Freilandmuseum", an open-air museum of historical houses that includes more than a dozen farmhouses as well as a church and a mill. The town hall is unusually large; it was built by Michael Kaut, architect of the Marienberg Fortress in Würzburg, in 1628. The town hall was renovated in 2012-13 and includes a "Museum of the Rhön". Also noteworthy are the Maulaffenturm, a medieval tower that served for centuries as the local jail; the town walls, dating back to the 14th century and renovated repeatedly, most recently in the 1970s; and the Gangolfskapelle, a 16th-century chapel with an adjacent early 20th century-grotto atop a hill (the "Kapellenberg") 1 km outside the town center. Much of the town was destroyed by fire in the 17th century, but the town center includes many half-timbered buildings dating from the late 17th and 18th centuries.

A steam-powered train, the "Rhön-Zügle", runs from Fladungen to Mellrichstadt on alternate Sundays from May to October.

== Services ==
The town has a public swimming pool and its own football club. There is a kindergarten and a school for grades 1-4. Regular bus services connect Fladungen to the nearby towns of Ostheim, Mellrichstadt and Bad Neustadt. There is a hotel with a conference center, along with more than twenty smaller inns and guest houses.

== Twinnings ==
- Kõo, Estonia (1996)
- Köyliö, Finland (1996)
- Nora, Sweden (1996)
