= Lütter =

River in Germany

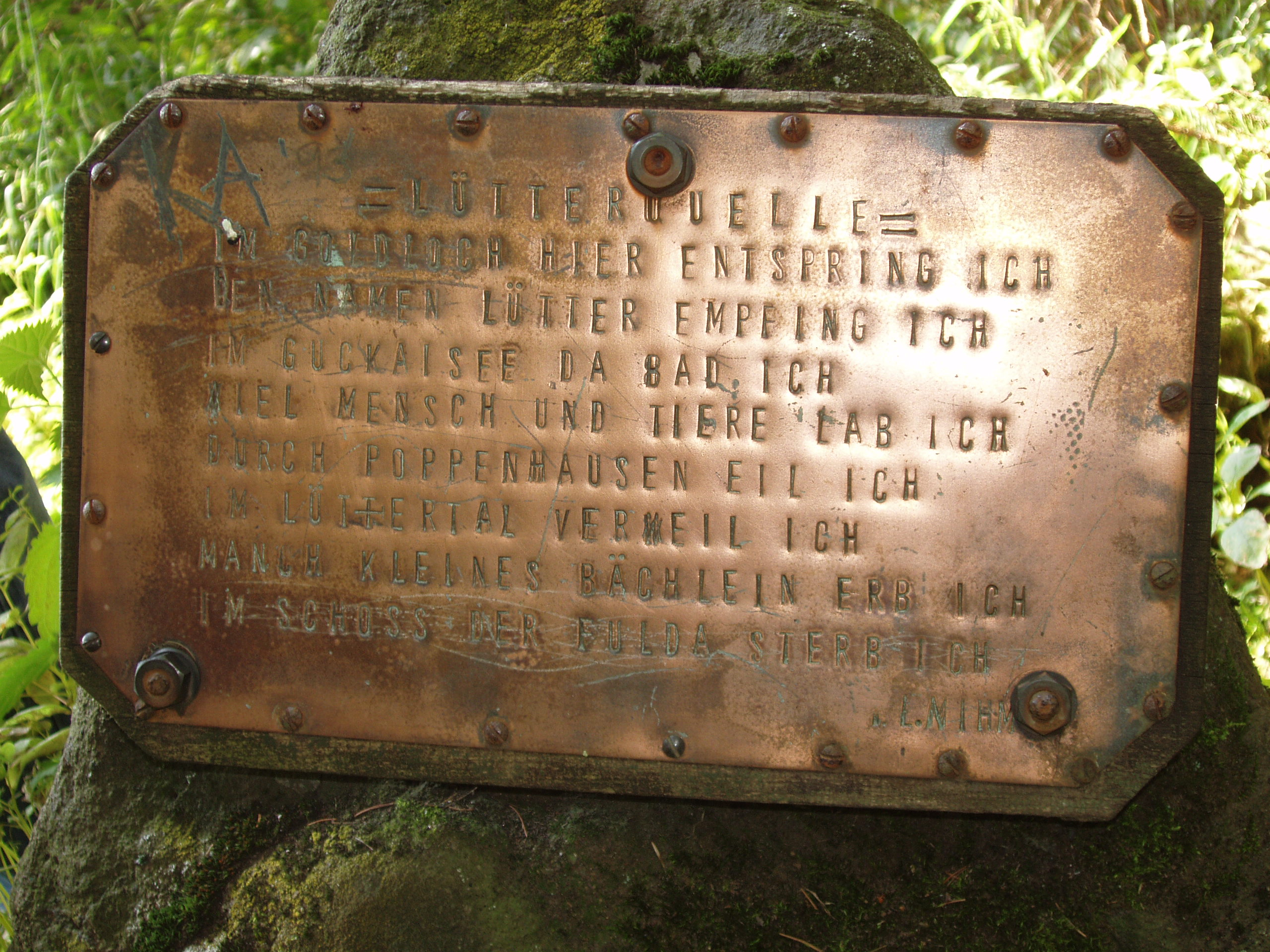

Location
- Country: Germany
- State: Hesse

Physical characteristics
- Mouth
  - location: Fulda
  - coordinates: 50.4735°N 9.7506°E
- Length: 17.4 km (10.8 mi)

Basin features
- Progression: Fulda→ Weser→ North Sea

Lütter (German pronunciation: [ˈlʏtɐ]) is a river of Hesse, Germany. It flows into the Fulda near Eichenzell.

== See also ==
- List of rivers of Hesse
