= Hessian Rhön Nature Park =

Nature park in Hesse, Germany

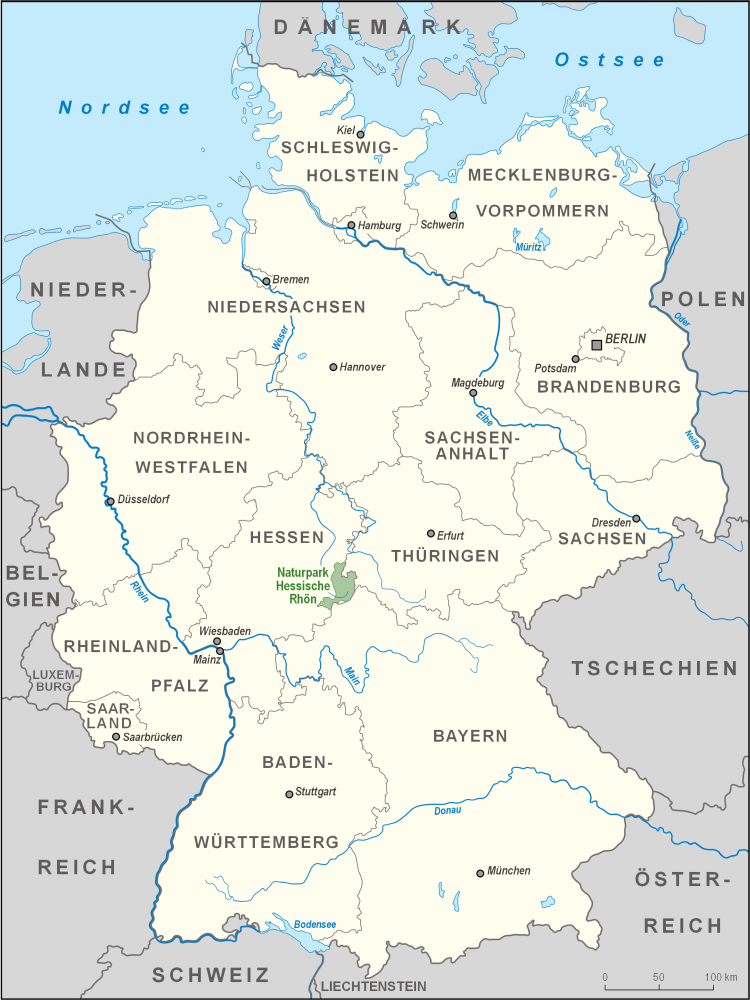
Location of the Hessian Rhön Nature Park

The Hessian Rhön Nature Park (German: Naturpark Hessische Rhön) lies east of Fulda in the German state of East Hesse on the border with Thuringia and Bavaria and has an area of 720,7 km^{2}. Together with the Bavarian Rhön Nature Park it is part of the Rhön Biosphere Reserve.

== Landscape ==
The nature park lies between the mountain and hill ranges of the Spessart, Vogelsberg, Thuringian Forest, Haßberge and Steigerwald. It is characterised by mixed forest, rivers, lakes like the Guckaisee, moors, grassland and dry biotopes.

== See also ==
- Rhön Mountains
- List of nature parks in Germany
- Bavarian Rhön Nature Park
