= Hohe Hölle =

Coordinates: 50°25′43″N 9°57′41″E

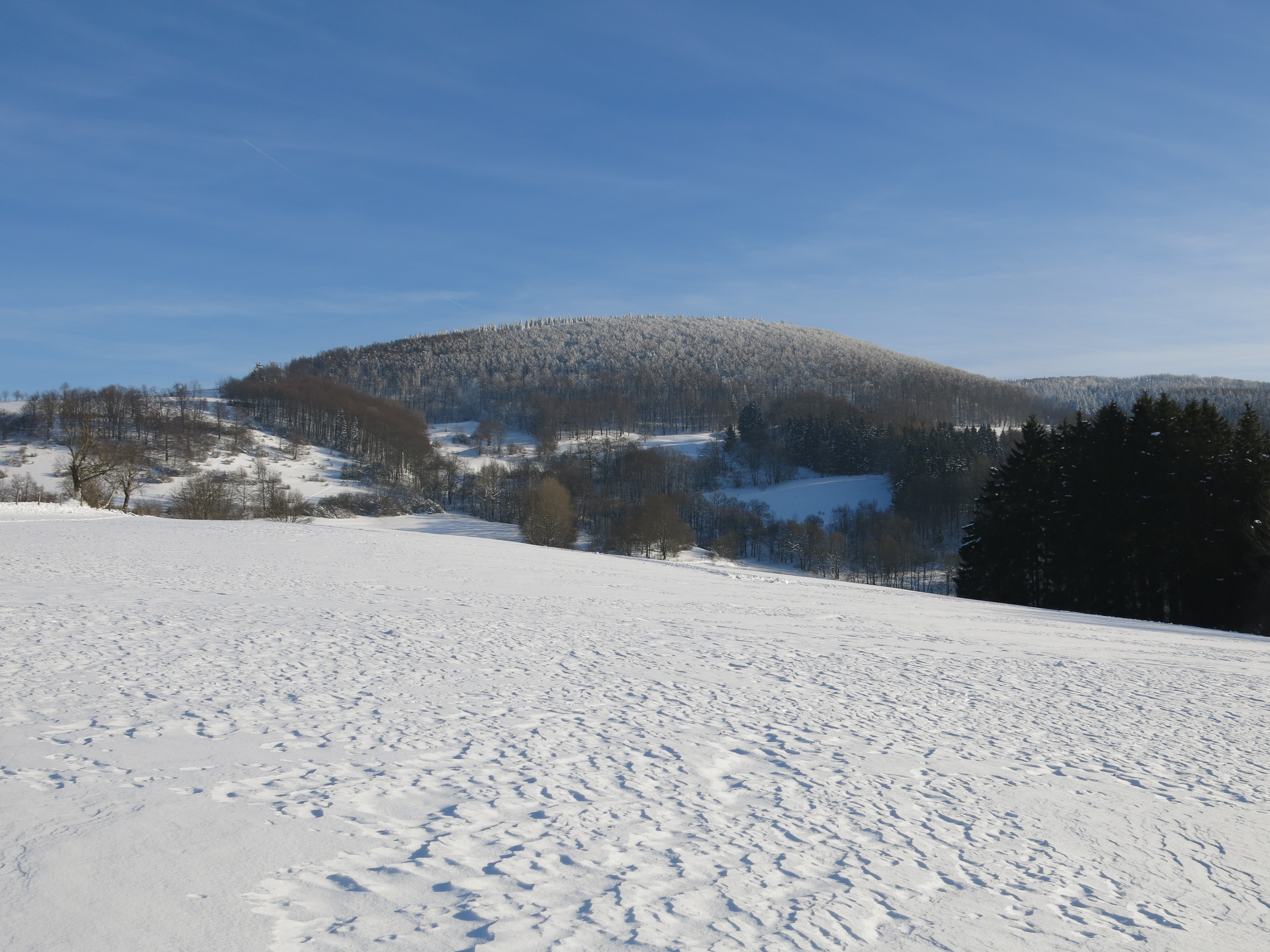
- View of Hohe Hölle in the Rhön Mountains

Highest point
- Elevation: 893.8 m (2,932 ft)

Geography
- Location: Bavaria, Germany

Hohe Hölle is a 893.8 m (2,932 ft) mountain of Bavaria, Germany.
