= Franz Georg Benkert =

Franz Georg Benkert (25 September 1790 – 20 May 1859) was a German Roman Catholic theologian and historical writer.

== Life ==
Benkert was born at Nordheim, near the mountain district of Rhön, Germany. After finishing his studies at the gymnasium in Münnerstadt he studied theology at Würzburg and was ordained priest in 1816. He was first a curate at Gaurettersheim and in 1821, was made vice-principal of the theological seminary at Würzburg.

While holding these positions Benkert continued his studies. In 1823 he received a doctorate, having offered the dissertation: "De Duplici Missâ Catechumenorum et Fidelium". From 1823 to 1838 he had the position of principal and in 1838 he was made a cathedral canon and cathedral dean.

Benkert opposed the contemporary Josephinism, and sought to reawaken in the younger clergy an interest in the old theological schools.

== Works ==
In 1822 he founded a periodical, to increase the influence of his efforts and also to win over the older ecclesiastics.

The periodical "Der Religionsfreund für Katholiken mit Beiträgen religiös gesinnter Manner" appeared in six volumes, 1822-26. It attracted much attention and was copied in France in the "Ami de la Religion".

In connection with G. J. Saffenrevter he issued, 1828–40, a continuation of this, his first, periodical, entitled: "Allgemeiner Religions- und Kirchenfreund und Kirchenkorrespondent, eine theologische und kirchenhistorische Zeitschrift". At the same time he published, 1828–34, a periodical entitled "Athanasia, eine theologische Zeitschrift, besonders für die gesamte Pastoral, für Kirchengeschichte, auch für Pädagogik". This appeared in sixteen volumes. He continued the same publication from 1835 to 1840 in connection with J. M. Düx.

Benkert's historical writings have only a local interest: a larger work which he undertook on the Rhön was never completed.

A self-righteous campaigner, he made many enemies, especially among the older clergy. He therefore severed his connection with his periodicals in 1840, and devoted himself to the study of the history of his native district. He died at Coburg.
