= Pferdskopf =

Mountain in Hesse, Germany

Coordinates: 50°29′29″N 9°55′16″E

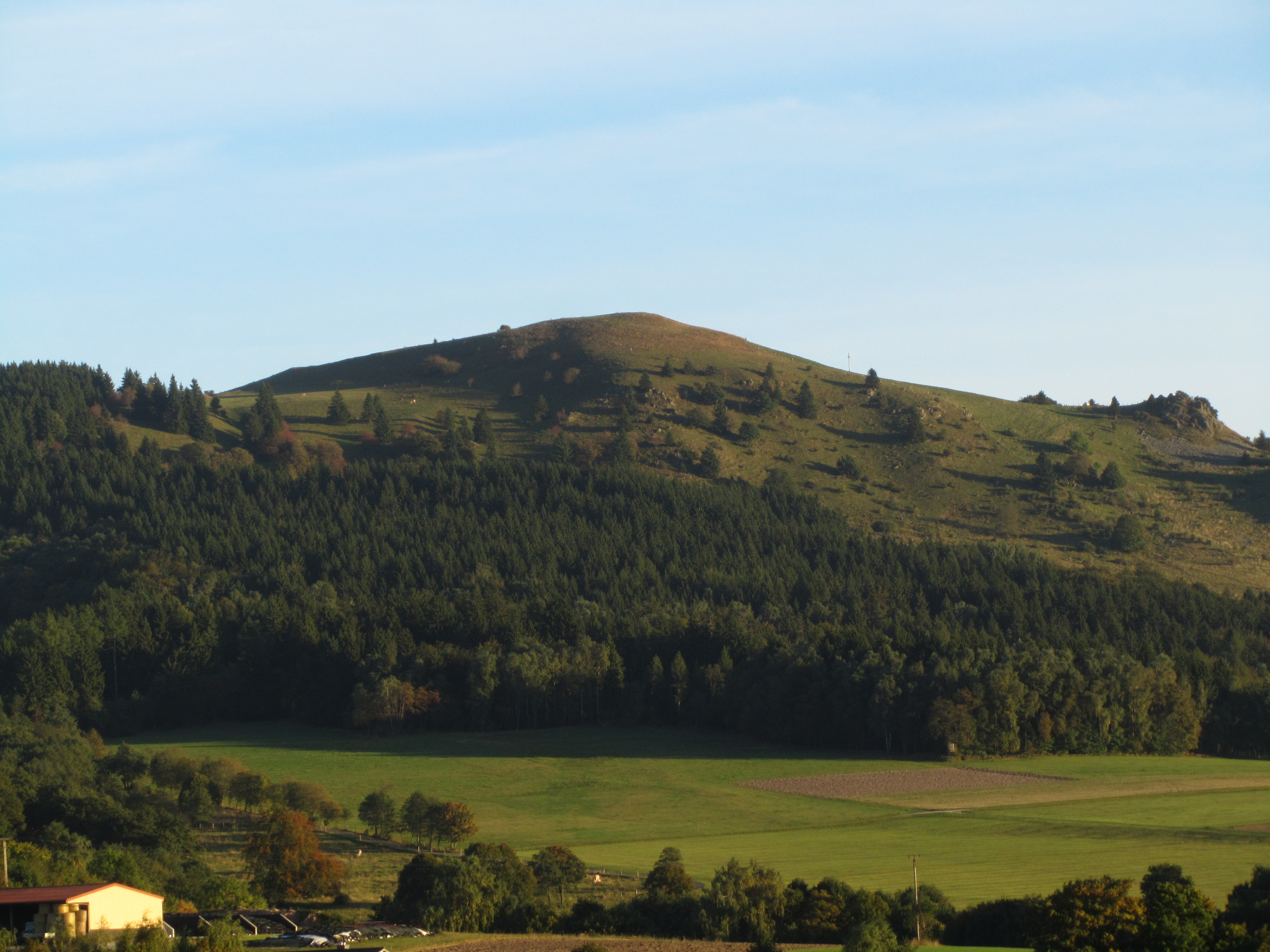
- Pferdskopf, seen from north

Highest point
- Elevation: 874.9 m (2,870 ft)

Geography
- Location: Hesse, Germany
- Parent range: Rhön Mountains

Pferdskopf is a mountain of Hesse, Germany, in the vicinity of the Wasserkuppe in the Rhön Mountains.
