= Rhön Biosphere Reserve =

Nature reserve in Germany

Coordinates: 50.3500°N 10.0500°E

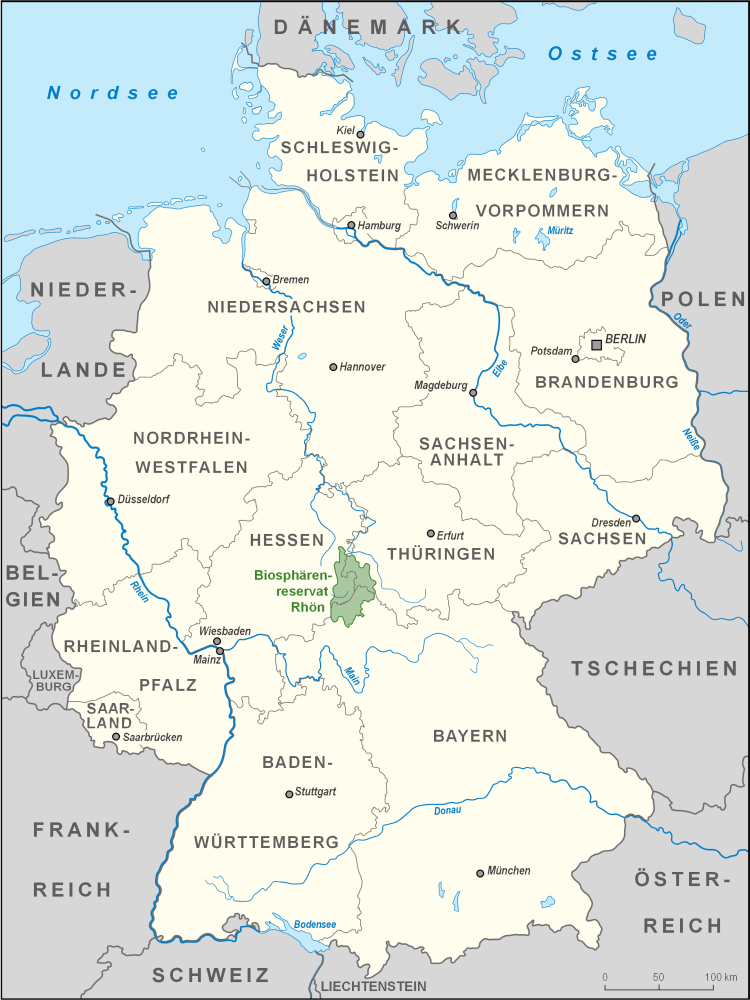
Location of the Rhön Biosphere Reserve

The Rhön Biosphere Reserve includes the entire central area of the Rhön Mountains, a low mountain range in the German states of Hesse, Bavaria and Thuringia.

== Aim ==
In 1991 the Rhön was recognised at international level by UNESCO as a biosphere reserve. The aim of this biosphere reserve is to take account of local agriculture, nature protection, tourism and trade, to ensure the variety and quality of habitats in the whole Rhön region. This involves creating a long-term economic environment for agriculture and trade that is in tune with the protection of nature and the local landscape. People are at the heart of the Rhön Biosphere Reserve. The idea is to have a so-called sustainable development, which harmonises economic and social issues as far as possible with environmental issues.

== History ==
As early as 12 September 1990, the Thuringian Rhön was declared a Rhön Biosphere Reserve by the Council of Ministers of the German Democratic Republic as part of the GDR's National Park Programme. The "Ordinance on the Designation of Nature Conservation Areas and a Landscape Protection Area of Central Importance with the Overall Designation of Rhön Biosphere Reserve" was published on 1 October 1990 in the Gesetzblatt of the German Democratic Republic.

In the winter of 1990/91, i.e. immediately after the Peaceful Revolution and German reunification, the three federal states of Bavaria, Hesse and Thuringia then submitted separate applications for its recognition as a UNESCO biosphere reserve. The Environment Minister at the time, Klaus Töpfer, made a joint proposal from them. On 6 March 1991, the three-state Rhön region was designated a biosphere reserve by UNESCO.

In Bavaria, Hesse and Thuringia, administrative offices have been set up that work together on the basis of an administrative agreement between the three states dated November 2002. At the same time, experts began to develop a framework concept. This framework concept, which was first handed over in April 1995, was the basis for all planning and measures.

In June 2014, the UNESCO Biosphere Reserve Rhön successfully underwent a review of its previous work by the International Coordinating Council, after which UNESCO status was confirmed for a further 10 years. At the same time, the Bavarian part of the UNESCO biosphere reserve was expanded by 58,000 hectares.

Between 2014 and 2017 the content of the framework concept was revised. The revised framework concept was presented on 16 May 2018.

== Zoning ==
The Biosphere Reserve currently has a total area of 184,939 hectares (714.05 sq mi), of which 72,802 ha are in Bavaria, 63,564 ha in Hesse and 48,573 ha in Thuringia. From 1991-1995 a "Concept for the Protection, Care and Development" for the Rhön with objectives and measures was drawn up in conjunction with the districts, communes, authorities and societies. Following the UNESCO zoning system, 4,199 ha (2.27%) of land were designated as a core areas that are not allowed to be directly used for any purpose e.g. agriculture or forestry. A further 67,483 ha (36.49%) are designated as buffer zones where there should only be careful use of land compatible with nature. The remaining areas are the zones of cooperation in which the villages and towns of the Rhön are situated.

== Gallery ==
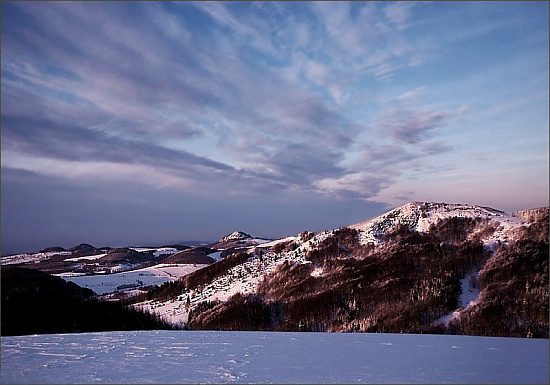
Milseburg and Pferdskopf

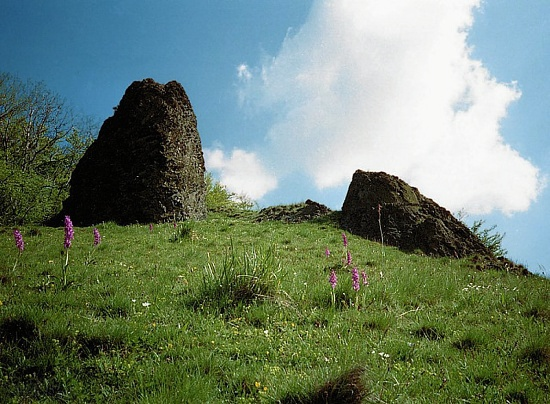
Mountain meadow with Early Purple Orchid in the High Rhön

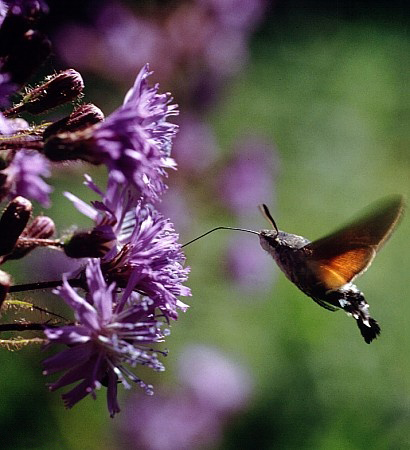
Hummingbird Hawk-moth feeds on an Alpine Blue-sow-thistle

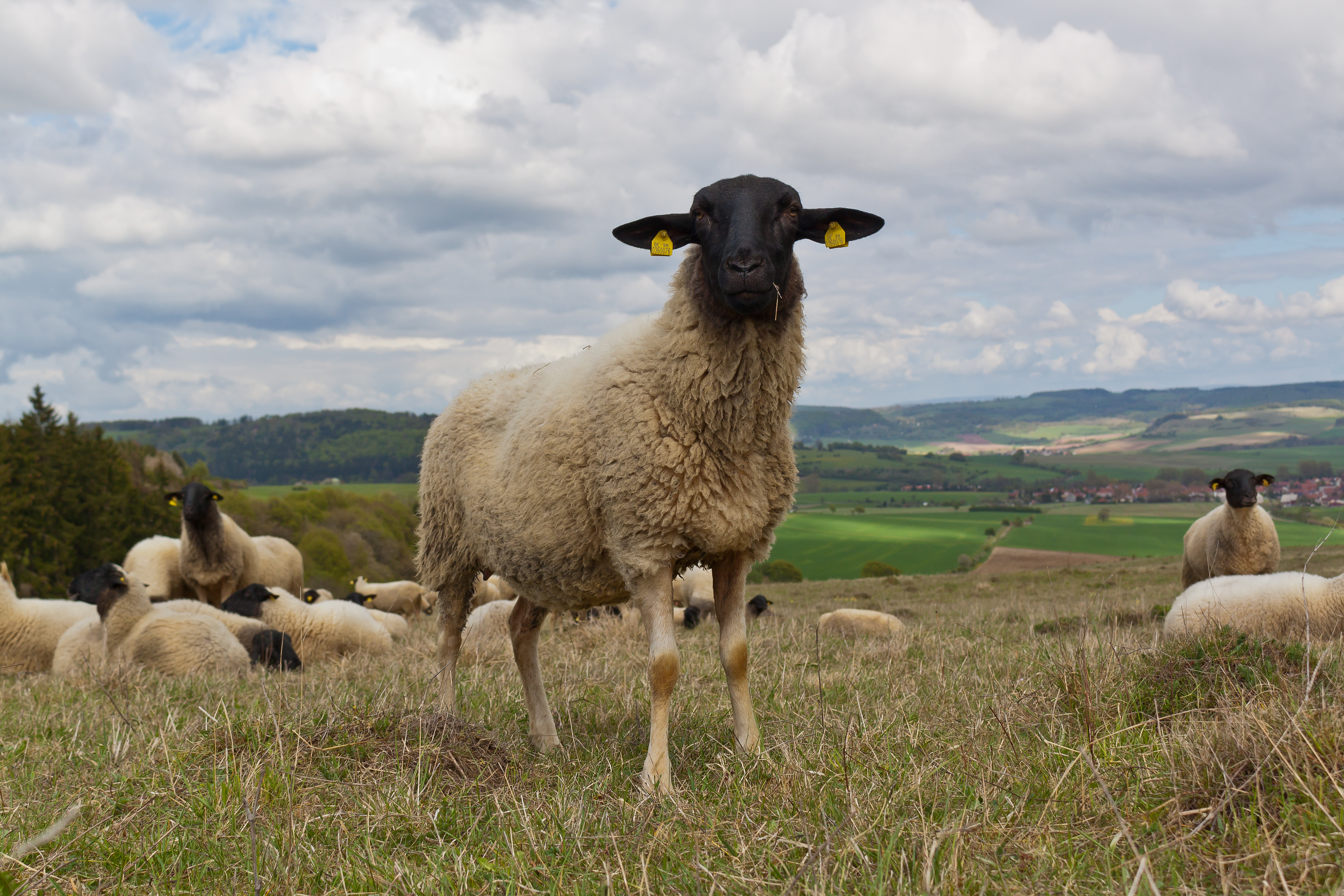
Rhön sheep

== See also ==
- Rhön Mountains
- Bavarian Rhön Nature Park
- List of biosphere reserves in Germany
