= Bavarian Rhön Nature Park =

Nature park in Germany

Coordinates: 50°25′N 9°58′E

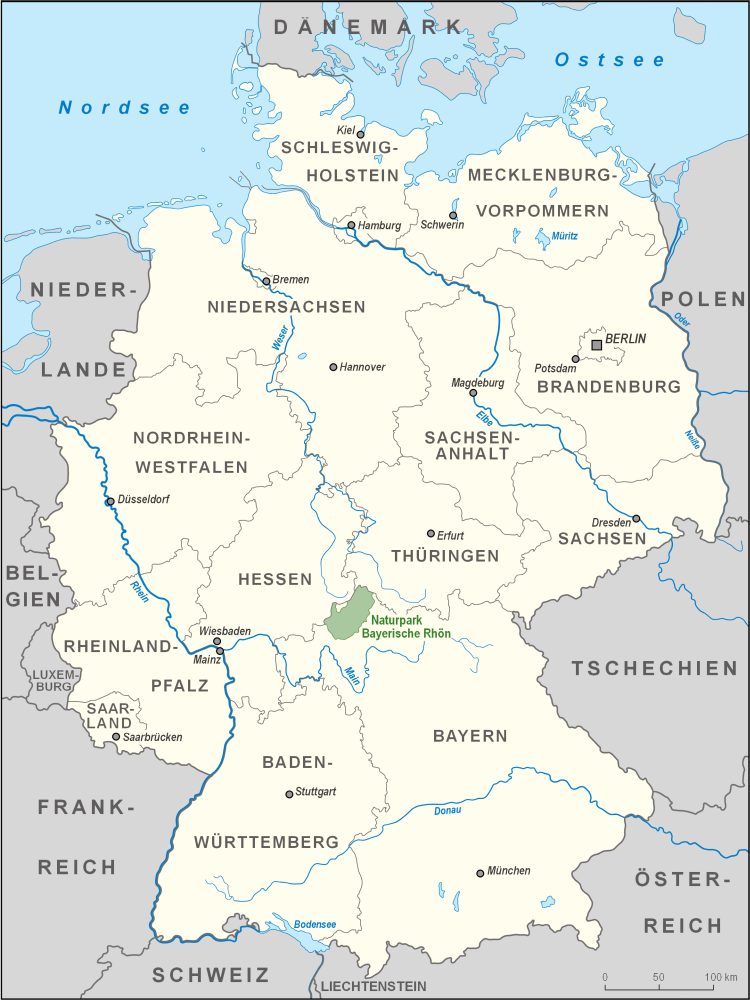
Location of the nature park in Germany

The Bavarian Rhön Nature Park (Naturpark Bayerische Rhön) straddles the junction of the German states of Bavaria, Hesse and Thuringia. 70 km^{2} of the total 125 km^{2} area of the nature park has been recognised by UNESCO as part of the Rhön Biosphere Reserve.
The organisation for the promotion of the Bavarian Rhön Nature Park (Zweckverband Naturpark Bayerische Rhön) was founded in 1967. On 26 November 1982 the regulation for the Naturpark Bayerische Rhön was issued and, in 1997, the Zweckverband became the Society for the Bavarian Rhön Nature Park and Biosphere Reserve (Naturpark und Biosphärenreservat Bayer. Rhön e.V.).

== Landscape ==
The nature park lies between the Spessart, Vogelsberg, Thuringian Forest, Haßberge and Steigerwald forest. It is characterised by mixed forests, streams of flowing water, moors, grassland and arid habitats.

Wasser Mountain, the highest peak of Rhön Mountains at 3,117 feet (950 metres), is in the nature park.

== See also ==
- List of nature parks in Germany
- Rhön Biosphere Reserve
