= Wartha =

Wartha may refer to the following places:

- Wartha (Königswartha), a part of Königswartha, Saxony, Germany
- Wartha (Eisenach), a part of Eisenach, Thuringia, Germany
- Wartha, the German name for Bardo, Lower Silesia, Poland
