= Gerstungen station =

Railway station in Gerstungen, Germany

Gerstungen
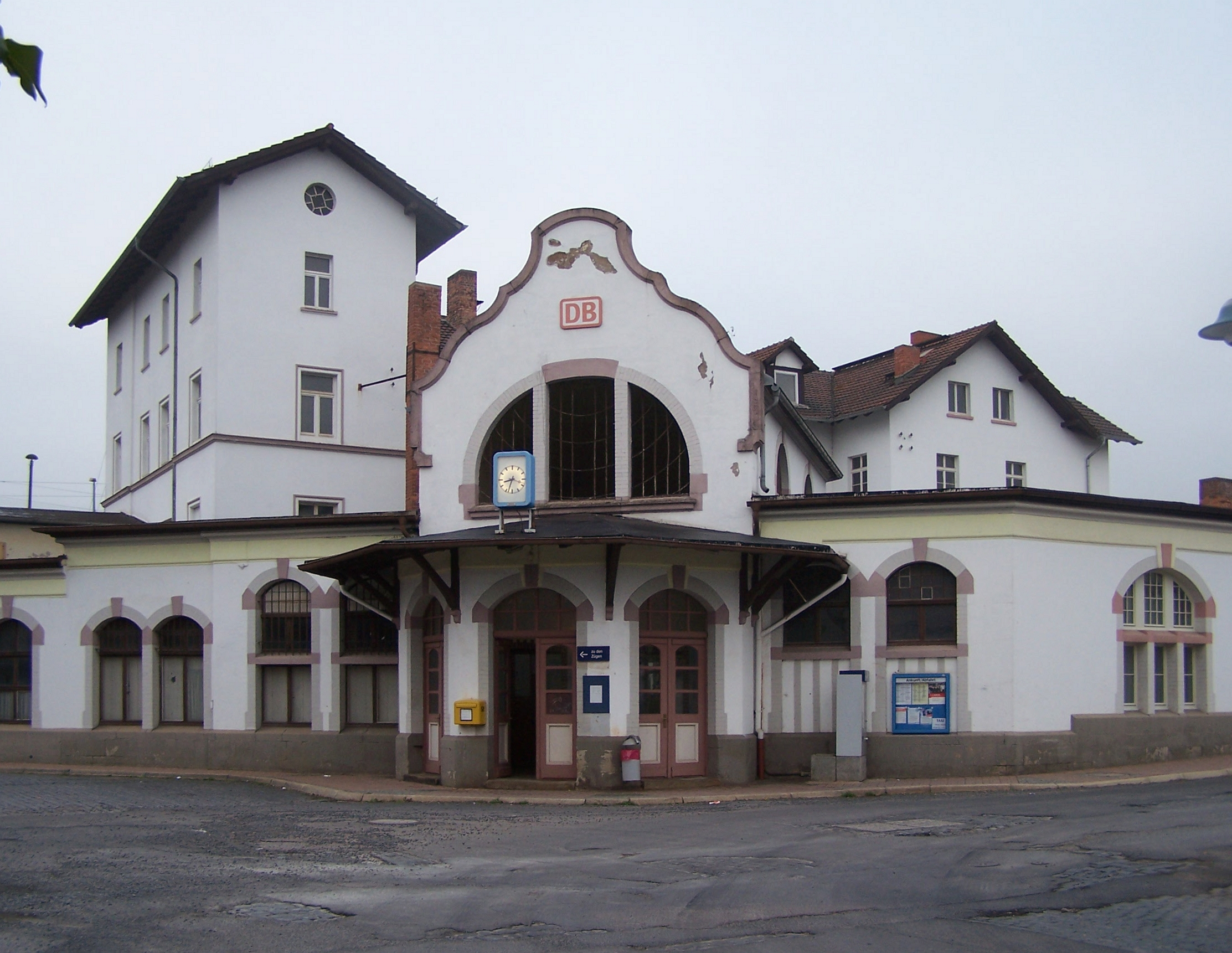
- Entrance building

General information
- Location: Bahnhofstr. 6, Gerstungen, Thuringia; Germany
- Coordinates: 50°57′54″N 10°03′55″E
- Lines: Halle–Bebra (km 189.32); Gerstungen–Vacha (km 0.0); former Förtha–Gerstungen (km 15.8)
- Platforms: 3

Construction
- Accessible: Platform 1 only

Other information
- Station code: 2105
- DS100 code: UGT
- IBNR: 8011629
- Category: 6
- Website: www.bahnhof.de

History
- Opened: 1849

Services
Preceding station	Cantus	Following station
Wildeck-Obersuhl towards Bebra	RB 6	Herleshausen Hp towards Eisenach
Location
- Location within Thuringia Location within Germany Location within Europe

Gerstungen station is located in the town of Gerstungen on the western border of the German state of Thuringia on the Halle–Bebra railway. The station has been particularly notable for its history as a border station between different states and railway administrations.

== History ==
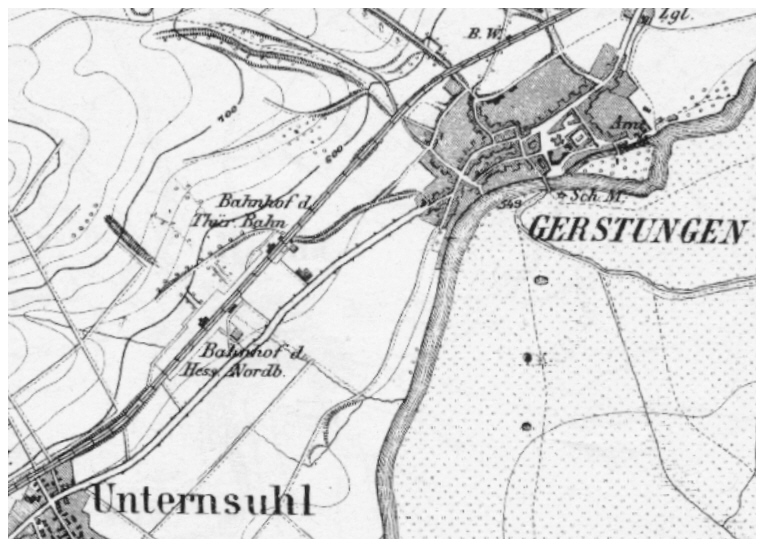
Map of the Gerstungen rail facilities in about 1860

Gerstungen received a rail connection in September 1849. The Thuringian Railway opened the last part of its trunk line from Eisenach to Gerstungen on 25 September 1849, three days before the Friedrich-Wilhelms-Nordbahn-Gesellschaft (Frederick William Northern Railway Company) opened its line from Bebra to Gerstungen.

The Thuringian Railway ended at the Thüringer Bahnhof (Thuringian station) and the Frederick William Northern Railway ended in Hessischer Bahnhof (Hessian station). These two stations were barely 100 metres apart from each other and were connected by a railway line, but treaties prevented unrestricted rail operations. Travellers had to change trains or were even forced to look for a lodging in Gerstungen. There were hostels and a highly frequented eatery near the station. Freight traffic was also affected by this separation. Freight had to be transferred between wagons, causing unnecessary loss of time and often also damage. The railway companies’ rolling stock could not be mixed. Only military transports and special trains were given exemptions. Since the change of traction and the transshipment of goods required a lot of staff, numerous railway workers settled near the station, so that with the influx of railway staff and their families, the population of Gerstungen increased by over 500 persons.

With the founding of the German Empire in 1871, the Prussian state railways were commissioned to ensure a unification of the railway networks of the Empire. This soon led to the takeover of the small state railways on the rail network. In 1882, both railway companies were bought up by the Prussian state railways, and the Hessian station was closed. Gerstungen acquired a special operational importance in 1898 with the opening of the main marshalling yard between Kassel and Weißenfels. Since the opening of the Gerstungen–Berka line on 1 October 1903, which was extended in stages to Vacha in 1905, Gerstungen station became a junction station. During the Second World War, the station was identified as a strategic destination and bombed in 1944. During this raid, adjacent houses were also hit and several inhabitants were killed. Trains running on the Gerstungen–Eisenach section were also attacked from the air.

=== Border station ===
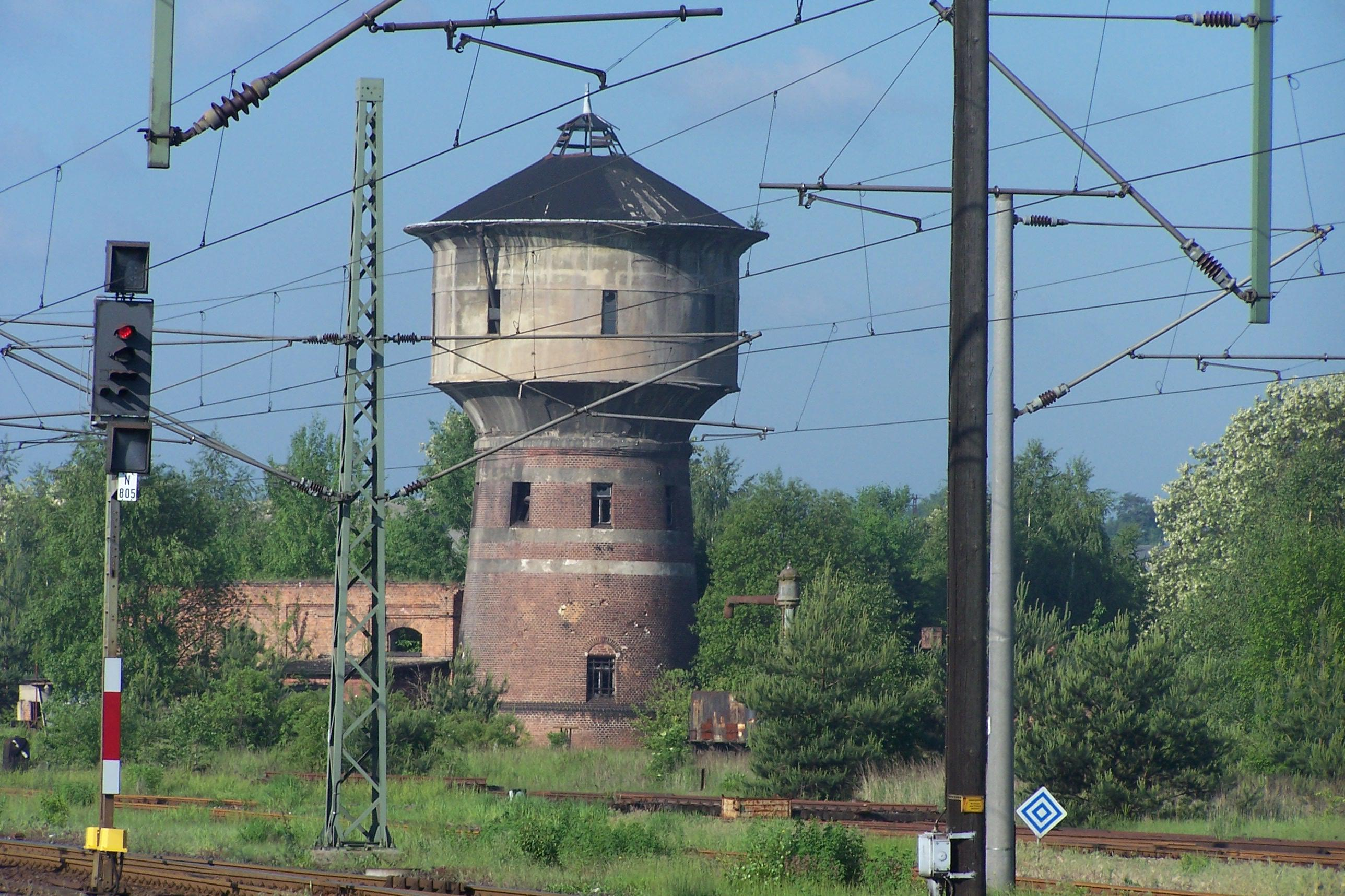
The station’s water tower

Gerstungen station was heavily affected by the division of Germany between the GDR and the Federal Republic of Germany after 1945. The first affected were the many war refugees and refugees who were transferred to transit camps in Herleshausen and Bebra.

Even during the brief US occupation of Thuringia, smuggling flourished. In the 1950s, the bordering places near Eisenach had a favourable location for people assisting escapes from East Germany. Accordingly, railway traffic in the neighbouring towns west of Eisenach was closely watched as a result.

Passenger trains to Gerstungen were sealed at Wartha station, in order to prevent passengers jumping off in the Hessian area around Herleshausen station. Passenger services were terminated at Eisenach in 1952. A bus service was established to Gerstungen as a substitute.

The railway served freight transport (especially potash mining) and interzone trains (Interzonenzüge, passenger trains between East and West Germany). The border formalities for the interzone trains on the GDR side had already been carried out at Wartha station. The military trains of the occupying powers travelling to and from West-Berlin passed through the station without controls.

On 13 April 1962, a line from Förtha to Gerstungen was inaugurated, which bypassed the West German territory around Herleshausen. The internal traffic from Gerstungen towards Eisenach was resumed. The border controls of the interzone trains were relocated from Wartha to Gerstungen from 28 September 1963, with the trains now using the new line. The old line through Wartha was only used to a limited extent by freight traffic. Between 1963 and 1978, a pair of freight train operated on the old line every day, serving the supply of fuel and industrial goods to the border regions. One of the largest brickworks in Thuringia, which was indispensable for post-war reconstruction, was located in Gerstungen.

The Gerstungen border station was considerably rebuilt. In 1966/67, a separate part of the station was set up on the north side of the station for the processing of Interzone trains. The old part station was redesigned as a terminus and served the passenger trains to Eisenach. Both stations were connected by a 150-metre-long tunnel. There were extensive facilities for freight transport between both parts. A special feature was the potassium trains, which came from Philippsthal and Heringen area in Hesse and, in the absence of a direct link to the rest of the Deutsche Bundesbahn’s network, ran over the Gerstungen–Vacha railway and to Gerstungen in the DDR and reversed in the station before heading back towards Bebra in the Federal Republic. A number of security measures, such as catch points, prevented entry into trains by unauthorised persons or the passage of trains to the Federal Republic without permission from the border authorities. Unlike most other border stations between the GDR and the Federal Republic, there was no interchange between interzone trains and domestic trains; entry and exit was generally not permitted to/from the interzone trains. In older Deutsche Reichsbahn foreign travel guides, this fact was pointed out specifically, but in later years the stop at the station was no longer shown.

A miniature replica of the Gerstungen border station by Modelleisenbahnfreunden Bremen e.V. can be visited on the grounds of the Jacobs University in Bremen.

=== Deaths at border controls ===
The Gerstungen parish recorded and reported five deaths, three West German citizens, one Gerstungen citizen and one other GDR citizen who died of stress-induced heart failure during the border controls or interrogations in the station area.

=== After the fall of the Wall ===
After the fall of the Wall, Gerstungen gradually lost its function as a border control station. The express trains in Gerstungen were allowed to enter and exit and rail services across the border increased significantly. On 3 March 1990, Willy Brandt travelled to Thuringia on the D 455 and spoke in front of numerous inhabitants while changing trains at Gerstungen station. For this purpose, a small platform had been set up on the platform.

Express trains no longer stopped in Gerstungen from September 1990. In 1991, Deutsche Bundesbahn extended their regional services from Bebra, which had previously ended in Hessian Obersuhl, to Gerstungen. Towards Eisenach, however, there was usually still a change until 1992, since there was no rail connection from the original station to Hesse and the trains had to use the old border station. The traditional route of the Thuringian Railway via Wartha was reopened on 25 May 1991 after 13 years of being closed, initially as a single-line operation. Until the completion of the second track on 27 September 1992, regional trains used the route via Förtha. This was no longer needed afterwards. On 19 July 1994, the Federal Railway Authority (Eisenbahn-Bundesamt) approved the closure of the line, which was dismantled in the following years.

On 28 May 1995, electrical operations were restored between Bebra and Neudietendorf, including in Gerstungen station. The Eisenach electronic interlocking was put into full operation on 16 June 1996. This took control of the entire section between Gerstungen and Gotha and the local signal boxes were closed. A special exhibition space has been established on the history of the Gerstungen station in the Werratalmuseum Gerstungen (Werra valley museum in Gerstungen). Historical railway technology and numerous pictorial documents are displayed.

The demolition of the locomotive depot and the border station began in May 2012 to create space for a solar farm. The former locomotive shed and the water tower are also to be demolished.

== Current services ==
Since 2006, Cantus Verkehrsgesellschaft (for ten years and since extended by another 15 years) has operated the RB6 service (Bebra–Gerstungen–Eisenach), stopping hourly in Gerstungen on weekdays and every two hours on Saturdays, Sundays or public holidays. The Gerstungen–Vacha railway is now only used for freight traffic.

== Platforms ==
The platforms and heights are as follows:

Platform	Length in m	Height in cm	Current use
1	156	38	Services towards Eisenach
2	156	38	Services towards Bebra
3	156	38	Services towards Bebra (occasional)
