= Halle–Bebra railway =

Railway line in Germany

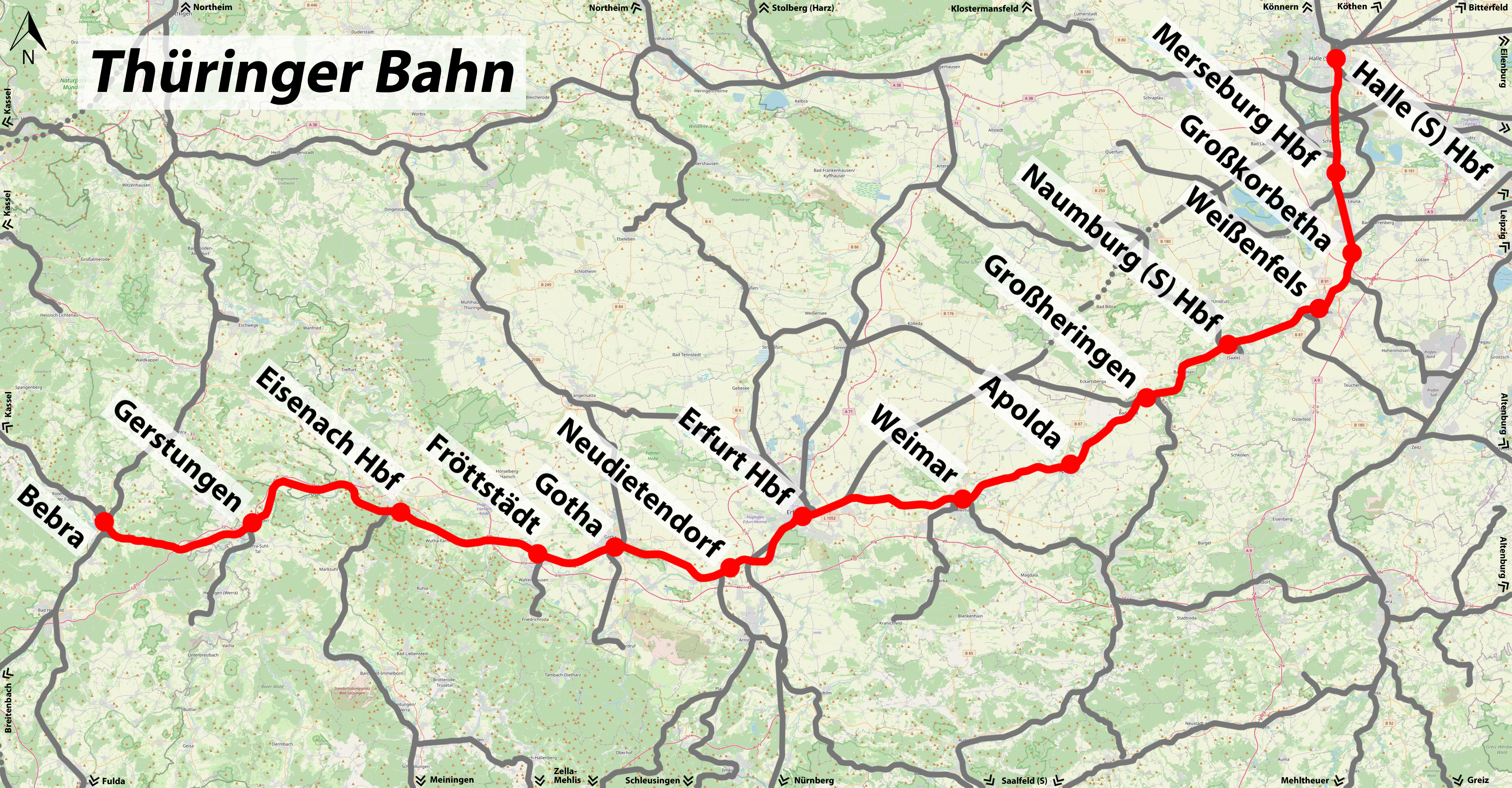

Overview
- Other name: Thuringian Railway
- Native name: Thüringer Bahn
- Line number: 6340
- Locale: Saxony-Anhalt, Thuringia, Hesse, Germany
- Termini: Halle; Bebra

Service
- Route number: 581, 580, 605

Technical
- Line length: 210.36 km (130.71 mi)
- Number of tracks: 2
- Track gauge: 1,435 mm (4 ft 8 1/2 in) standard gauge
- Electrification: 15 kV/16.7 Hz AC catenary
- Operating speed: 160 km/h (99 mph) (maximum)

The Halle–Bebra railway, known in German as the Thüringer Bahn ("Thuringian Railway"), is a 210 kilometre-long railway line from Halle (Saale) via Erfurt and Gerstungen to Bebra, mainly in Thuringia. As far as Gerstungen the line originally belonged to the Thuringian Railway Company. From Gerstungen to Bebra, it was owned by the Frederick William Northern Railway (Friedrich-Wilhelms-Nordbahn), named after the Prussian king, Frederick William IV. It is now a two-track, electrified, standard gauge mainline operated by DB Netze. It was opened between 1846 and 1849 and was the first railway line in Thuringia (apart from a small piece of the Leipzig–Hof line of the Saxon-Bavarian Railway Company —Sächsisch-Bayerische Eisenbahn-Compagnie— near Altenburg). All types of trains from Regionalbahn to ICE currently run on the line except Interregio-Express. Four of the six largest cities in Thuringia are located on the line.

== History ==
The Thuringian Railway is part of the southern east–west line between Halle and Kassel. It follows an old trade route, the Via Regia between Leipzig and Frankfurt. Its construction was agreed to under a treaty signed on 20 December 1841 between the Kingdom of Prussia, the Grand Duchy of Saxe-Weimar-Eisenach and the Duchy of Saxe-Coburg and Gotha. The first section from Halle to Weissenfels was opened by the Thuringian Railway Company (Thüringische Eisenbahn-Gesellschaft) on 20 June 1846. Six months later, on 19 December, it was opened to Weimar and on 1 April 1847, it was opened to Erfurt. The Erfurt–Eisenach section opened on 24 June 1847 and the rest on 25 September 1849.

=== Modernisation since 1990 ===
In February 1990, rail workers and executives of both national railways came together in Eisenach to initiate the closing of the gap between Bebra and Eisenach. In May 1991, the first train ran on the reconstructed section. The Eisenach–Gerstungen section was reopened for the 1991 timetable change and the second track was opened on 26 September 1992. At the same time, the Förtha–Gerstungen railway was abandoned as a bypass of the West German territory and was dismantled in 1993.

The electrotechnical services of Deutsche Reichsbahn and Deutsche Bundesbahn took part in discussions on the electrification of the 88 km-long section between Bebra and Neudietendorf. This resulted in an upgrade program which, among other things, increased the speed of the line to 160 km/h (and potentially 200 km/h), the elimination of level crossings and the reconstruction of the Berlin Curve (Berliner Kurve) that bypasses Bebra towards Fulda. A framework design was adopted for the Neudietendorf–Eisenach section by the beginning of 1993. The planning for the free route between Eisenach and Gerstungen had been completed and the preliminary design for Gerstungen station had been confirmed. The state's plan was sufficiently developed for the initiation of the planning approval process of the 110-kV line in Thuringia and fine-tuning was in progress in the spring of 1993.

The further modernisation of the Erfurt–Bebra section was carried out as Verkehrsprojekt Deutsche Einheit Nr. 7 (German Unity Transport Project no. 7). The estimated cost of the section between Neudietendorf and the state border was 1.6 billion DM. The electrification of the section was started in 1993 and completed in the summer of 1995 in time for a timetable change. Since May 1995, the line has been electrified and the maximum speed is 160 km/h in substantial parts, with the exception, for example, of Erfurt and Bebra stations and the Hönebach Tunnel (983 m long, 90 km/h). Electronic interlockings were installed in Eisenach and Neudietendorf and another was later installed at Erfurt Hauptbahnhof. The Neudietendorf electronic interlocking controls all signals and turnouts on the section from Erfurt-Bischleben to the approach to Wandersleben and the Eisenach electronic interlocking controls the Wandersleben–Gerstungen section. The section from Gerstungen is supervised by the track plan signal box in Bebra. In exceptional cases, the unstaffed signal box in Hönebach is staffed. The freight yard in Eisenach is also controlled by a track plan signal box.

The project was carried out by Deutsche Bahn AG. A total of €913 million was invested within the scope of the German Unity Transport Project no. 7, allowing the travel time for long-distance traffic between Bebra and Erfurt to be reduced from 135 minutes (in 1990) to 59 minutes.

The Erfurt–Leipzig/Halle high-speed railway has been operating parallel to the eastern section between Halle and Erfurt since 2015. The line, which runs north of the Thuringian Railway through sparsely populated areas, has taken a large part of the long-distance traffic from the Thuringian railway, thus relieving the congestion on the old line and also shortening travel times.

The first stage of the reconstruction, beginning in October 2005, ran from the southern approach to Halle to the exit from the high-speed line to the city. A new external platform was built at Halle-Ammendorf station south of the existing location. A new electronic interlocking took over the functions of four former signal boxes and a total of 6300 m of noise barriers was built. The permitted operating speed in this section was raised after completion of the construction work from 120 km/h to 160 km/h. A total of €92.5 million was invested, €64.4 million of it from the European Regional Development Fund. The upgrade of the 5.6 km-long section was completed at the end of May 2008. The connection to the high-speed line, including a flying junction, was built in a second stage from 2010 to 2011.

Extensive construction work took place between Erfurt and Weimar from 2010 to 2012. The line between Erfurt and the junction with the high-speed line to Halle/Leipzig was renovated, the stations in Weimar and Vieselbach were renovated and overhead wire, which had been erected in 1967 and was over 40 years old, was replaced. Preparations were also made for the integration of the high-speed line.

The railway node of Merseburg has been extensively modernised since March 2011. New track and overhead wire as well as an electronic interlocking were installed. At the station, the platform and the passenger subway were thoroughly renovated. The extensive works were completed in 2013.

According to the planning as envisaged in 1997, some sections of the old Erfurt–Halle/Leipzig railway would have also been upgraded for speeds of up to 200 km/h. An upgrade of the section between Neudietendorf and Eisenach for a maximum speed of 200 km/h is provided as an option.

=== Outlook ===
The Erfurt–Eisenach section is to be upgraded by December 2019 for speeds of 200 km/h over a length of about 54 km as part of German Unity Transport Project no. 7. The top speed will be raised from 140 to 160 km/h from Erfurt to Wandersleben and to 200 km/h continuing to Eisenach. An exception to this is the passage through Gotha, which is to be ungraded for 180 km/h. This includes, among other things, the renewal of the superstructure on a 28 km-long section and the renewal of 30 sets of points. In addition, the subgrade is to be improved over a length of four kilometres along the Leina Canal and two bridges are to be rebuilt in Fröttstädt and Seebergen. ETCS Level 2 is to be installed as the train protection system. These measures are designed to shorten the travel time by up to 3 minutes and to achieve a travel time of 4 1/4 hours between Dresden and Frankfurt am Main. According to earlier information, the upgrade was to be completed in 2017. The journey time between Erfurt and Frankfurt Airport would be less than two hours.

The Free State of Thuringia submitted, in preparation for the Federal Transport Plan (Bundesverkehrswegeplan) of 2015, the upgrade of the Erfurt line and the Neudietendorf–Eisenach line for 200 km/h to optimise connections to/from Frankfurt through the new Erfurt ICE junction. For this purpose, the elimination of level crossings is due to be completed to the end of 2017. The state also announced the upgrade of the line from Erfurt towards Halle/Leipzig, with the maximum speed raised for all conventional trains to 160 km/h, which is currently only the case for tilting trains.

The line, as part of the Fulda–Erfurt axis, is to be prepared by the end of 2017 for the use of eddy current brake (ICE 3). A 19 km-long section between Eisenach and Gerstungen would be largely upgraded for 160 km/h operations by 2017. This will allow Erfurt to operate as a node for clock-face scheduling. Since 2014, planning has been under way for the replacement or the upgrading of the line to the east of the Hönebach Tunnel, also for 160 km/h. After completion of these measures, the line between the Berlin curve and Erfurt would thus be largely operable at 160 km/h at least.

Modernisation, including the upgrade of the stations Schkopau and Bad Kösen for barrier-free access, is planned in the coming years with federal and state funds.

== Operations ==
The Thuringian trunk line is served by both long-distance and regional passenger services. The railway is more susceptible to delays than any line in Thuringia, except the Weimar–Gera railway, due to the high traffic volume on this route and the mixed operation of express and regional passenger traffic with long routes, along with goods traffic.

=== Passenger services ===
Regional passenger services run over only parts of the Bebra–Halle railway. The Hessian section between Bebra and Eisenach has been operated by Cantus as NVV line R6 with Stadler Flirt electric multiple units (EMUs) since December 2006. Previously this section was served by Deutsche Bahn using both Halberstädter Mitteleinstiegswagen (Halberstädt central-entry carriages) and double-deck carriages. During the peak hour, some trains ran from Erfurt to Bebra or from Eisenach to Bad Hersfeld. Line RB20 runs between Eisenach and Halle (Saale) and is managed by Nahverkehrssservicegesellschaft Thüringen (Thuringian local transport authority). Until December 2015, this line was operated with DB Regio trains, which also used Halberstädt central-entry carriages or double-deck carriages. In the peak hour, services on line 22A ran on the Eisenach–Gotha–Erfurt/Erfurt–Weimar–Apolda route until 2014, using class 612 or Siemens Desiro Classic (class 642) EMUs. These additional services have been operated as part of line RB20 since December 2014. They are also partly operated between Erfurt and Apolda by Erfurter Bahn multiple units. The services of the Thuringian Railway were tendered in 2012 as part of the Elektronetzes Saale-Thüringen-Südharz (Saale-Thuringia-South Harz Electric Network). The contract was awarded to Abellio Rail Mitteldeutschland, which took over the regional operations for 15 years in December 2015. Three and five-part Talent-2 electric multiple units are used.

On the eastern section, four new, two-hour routes have been operated since then, in addition to the existing Regionalbahn RB20 service, as Regional-Express or Stadt-Express services: Erfurt–Halle, Erfurt–Großkorbetha(–Leipzig), (Saalfeld–Jena–)Bad Kösen–Halle and (Saalfeld–Jena–)Bad Kösen–Großkorbetha(–Leipzig), to compensate for the loss of long-distance services as a result of the commissioning of the Erfurt–Leipzig/Halle high-speed railway. Due to the reconstruction of the Halle (Saale) Hauptbahnhof railway node, the express services on the Naumburg–Halle section are operated by DB Regio for the time being, which run via Halle to Köthen and Magdeburg.

Between Gotha and Weimar, the Regional-Express service, RE1 runs over the Thuringian Railway. These trains, which are composed of class 612 tilting trains, run from Göttingen to Glauchau. Some RE1 services also continued to Chemnitz and Zwickau prior to 2014. In addition, the combined RE3/RE7 express service runs from Würzburg via Schweinfurt and Suhl to Erfurt and, after a 20-minute stop, continues from there with a number change via Weimar and Gera to Altenburg or Elsterberg. This service is also operated with class 612 tilting trains. Between Wandersleben and Neudietendorf and between Erfurt and Weimar, these trains are the only ones which can operate at 160 km/h. Non-tilting trains are limited to 140 km and 120 km/h respectively.

Other regional services use the short sections of the line between Naumburg and Saaleck and between Erfurt and Neudietendorf.

=== Long-distance passenger services ===
In long-distance passenger traffic, the Thuringian Railway represents an important part of the Frankfurt–Berlin and the Frankfurt–Dresden corridors. Even during the division of Germany until 1989, transit trains ran between Frankfurt and Berlin and express trains ran between Frankfurt and Dresden, Leipzig, Cottbus or Chemnitz. Since the end of Communism, the main line has been served by Intercity services. The former line 9 operated at two-hour intervals from Saarbrücken via Frankfurt and continuing to Erfurt, Leipzig and Dresden. The EuroCity train pair Goethe, which ran from Paris to Prague, also ran over the Thuringian Railway. These trains stopped only in Eisenach, Erfurt and Weimar on the Thuringian Railway. In addition to the IC services, two InterRegio services were added In 1993. The first line (36) ran from Frankfurt via Erfurt and Halle to Berlin, with some services continuing to the Baltic coast. The second line (20) ran from Aachen via Paderborn, Kassel and Erfurt, continuing to Gera and Chemnitz. The electric locomotives of these trains were substituted with diesel locomotives in Weimar, since the following line, the Weimar–Gera railway was not electrified. Both InterRegio lines served in addition to the stops of the Intercity services, the stations in Bebra, Gotha, Naumburg and Weißenfels. With the upgrade of the main line for the use of tilting trains, the IC 9 service was converted in the summer of 2000 to operation by ICE T as the new ICE 50 (Wiesbaden/Saarbrücken–Frankfurt–Erfurt–Leipzig–Dresden) service. The journey times were shortened by about 20 minutes and for the first time large parts of the main line could be operated at a top speed of 160 km/h. The InterRegio traffic on the Bebra–Halle railway ended in 2002. IR 36 service was replaced by IC 15 and IR 20 was replaced by the new IC 51 service, with services now beginning and ending in Weimar. In 2004, IC 15 service was converted to ICE-T operation and integrated into line 50, which now ran hourly between Frankfurt (Main) and Dresden. The IC 51 service, which previously ended in Weimar, was extended to Berlin and Stralsund. In 2008, due to a problem with axles, the tilt technology of the ICE-T sets had been taken out of service. The timetable was revised in order to be able to better absorb the resulting extensions of travel time. From 2010 to 2015, a mixed cycle of Intercity and ICE services operated on the Thuringian Railway, each with the number 50. The running distances and the train types of the services were changed several times during this period. Basically, the timetable was provided a service every two hours, with all trains stopping in Eisenach, Gotha, Erfurt, Weimar and Naumburg, while an alternating service also ran every two hours but only stopped in Eisenach and Erfurt and as a result achieved the approximately 15 minute shorter running times of the tilting-train period. Services on line 15 between Frankfurt and Berlin and line 50 between Frankfurt and Dresden are again operated exclusively with ICEs and have used the newly opened Erfurt–Leipzig/Halle high-speed railway from Erfurt since December 2015. The trains of line 15 stop on the Thuringian Railway only in Erfurt. In addition, three IC train pairs of the former IC line 51 remain, which, coming from Kassel, stop in Bebra, Eisenach, Gotha, Erfurt and Weimar. One train pair continues from Weimar via Großheringen on the Saal Railway to Jena-Göschwitz, another train runs from Weimar via Naumburg to Halle. These are operated with the new double sets.

From 12 January to September 2016, ICE line 28 between Berlin and Munich was redirected over the Erfurt–Bebra section (using the Berlin Curve) due to a blockade on the direct route. In addition, several night trains run over the line to Basel and Prague.

=== Freight traffic ===
Important freight terminals are located in Halle, Großkorbetha, Vieselbach (freight transport centre), Erfurt, Eisenach (car industry, timber), Gerstungen (traction change of the potassium trains) and Bebra.

== Route ==
=== Halle–Großkorbetha ===
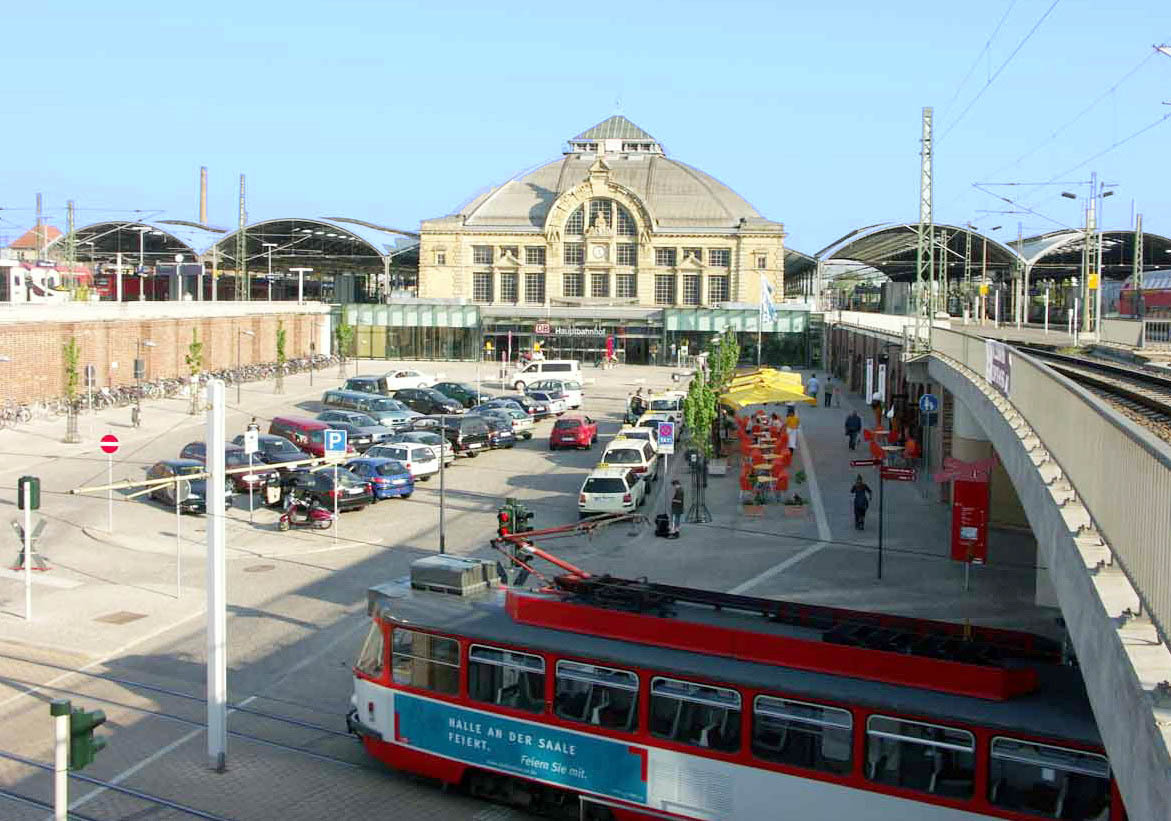
Halle station

The Thuringian Railway starts in Halle (Saale) Hauptbahnhof, which it leaves in a southerly direction. It is the most important railway line in southern Saxony-Anhalt. Immediately south of the station the line to Leipzig branches to the east. Further south in the city of Halle, the Halle–Kassel line leaves the Thuringian Railway running to the west. Shortly before Amendorf station, a 3.614 km-long line branches off the Thuringian Railway to connect it with the Erfurt–Leipzig/Halle high-speed railway. The Thuringian Railway runs through Halle-Amendorf station and then crosses the White Elster. This is followed by the crossing of the Saale and Schkopau station. Here the Buna-Werke plastics factory is connected via the Thuringian railway to the railway network of the Middle German Chemical Triangle. South of Schkopau the line runs through Merseburg, the first middle-sized city on the line. Here a line branches to the west through the Geisel valley to Querfurt and the largely decommissioned Merseburg–Leipzig line branches off to the east. Immediately south of Merseburg the line runs through the Leuna-Werke (where IG Farben produced synthetic oil during World War II and which is now a location of a Total oil refinery and numerous chemical factories) to Großkorbetha, where it meets the main line from Leipzig. The section to Weißenfels was electrified in 1959. During the existence of the German Democratic Republic, this section of the line had great importance, especially for commuting from Halle-Neustadt to the chemical works in Leuna and Buna. From 1967 to 1990 passenger trains operated on this route with up to twelve double-deck carriages. These trains had the largest seating capacity in Germany.

=== Großkorbetha–Saaleck junction ===
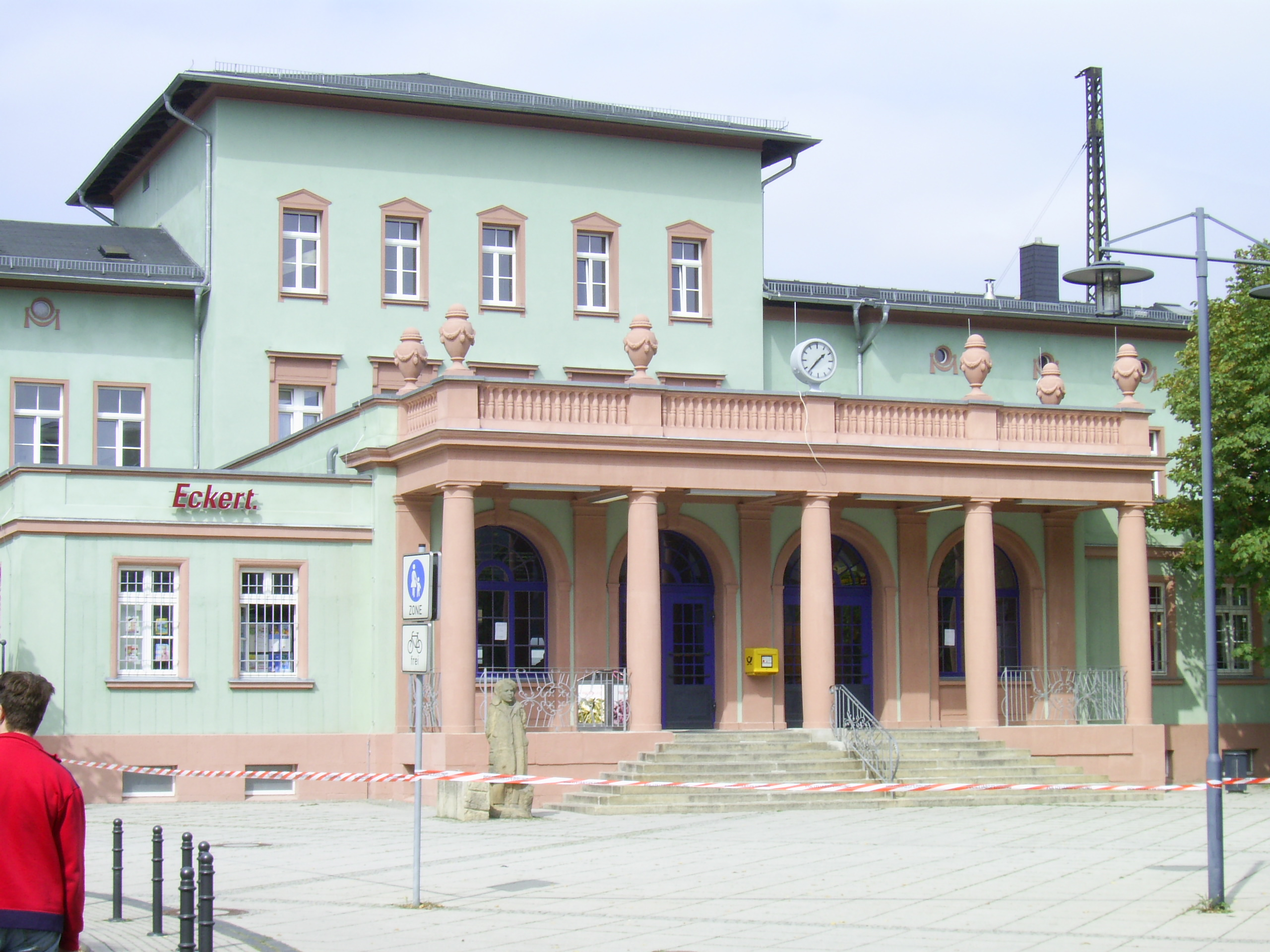
Naumburg Hbf

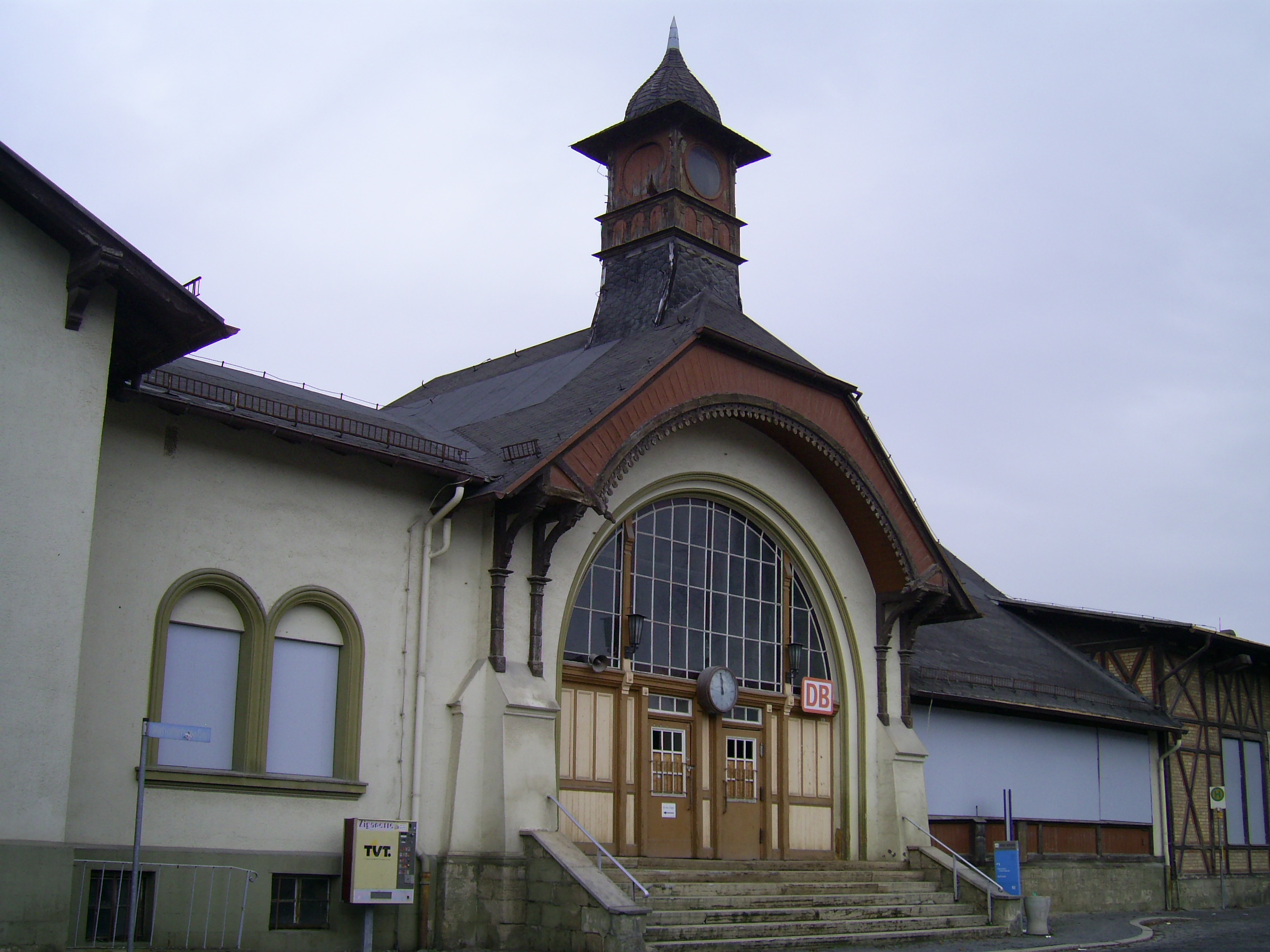
Bad Kösen station 2007

The 32-kilometer Großkorbetha–Saaleck junction section in central Germany (Mitteldeutschland) is very busy as it combines east–west traffic (Dresden–Frankfurt) with north–south traffic (Berlin–Munich). Already in 1937, 30 long-distance trains ran on this section each day, in 1989, there were as many as 37 long-distance trains and there were 35 pairs of trains in 2004. South of Großkorbetha station the line runs near the Saale, crossing it eight times before Saaleck. Next, the line reaches the city of Weißenfels, where a main line branches off to Gera via Zeitz. Until Die Wende there was also a large freight yard with 252 sets of points in Weissenfels; today there are still 12 sets of points and five tracks. The importance of Weissenfels as a railway junction has been reduced with passenger operations based in Naumburg and freight operations based in Großkorbetha. Naumburg is the first town on the line with a stop for long-distance traffic. Southwest of Naumburg, the line passes through the scenic Saale-Unstrut-Triasland nature park, where the Saale valley is lined with vineyards. After the spa town of Bad Kösen, the Saal Railway branches to the south towards Jena, Saalfeld and Munich. Above the Saale valley here are the castles of Saaleck and Rudelsburg. Electric traction was possible on this section for the first time in 1941, but five years later, in 1946, all components of the electrical equipment were removed as reparations to the Soviet Union. In 1965, the line was re-electrified, this time to Neudietendorf.

=== Saaleck–Erfurt ===
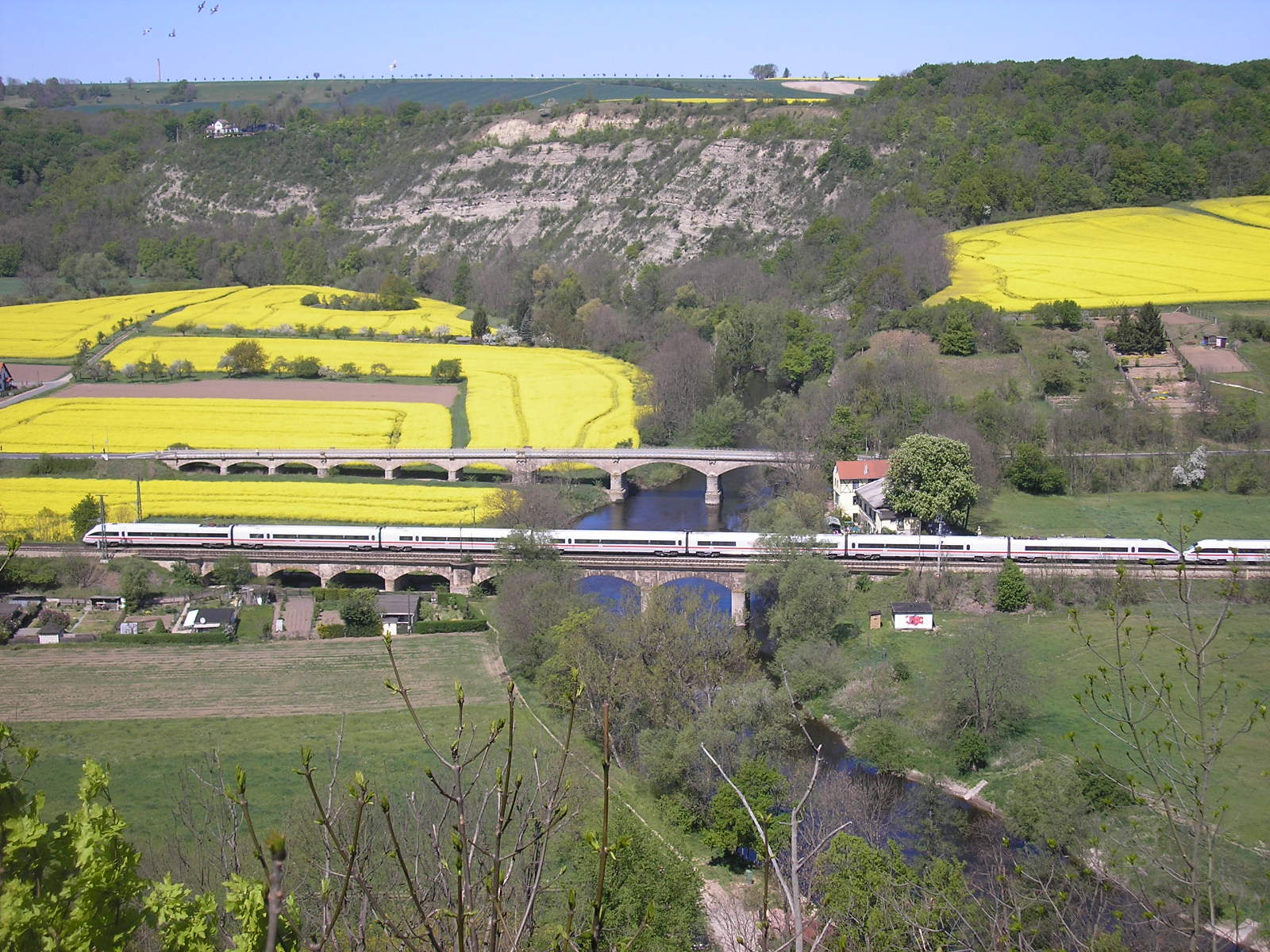
Intercity-Express near Saaleck

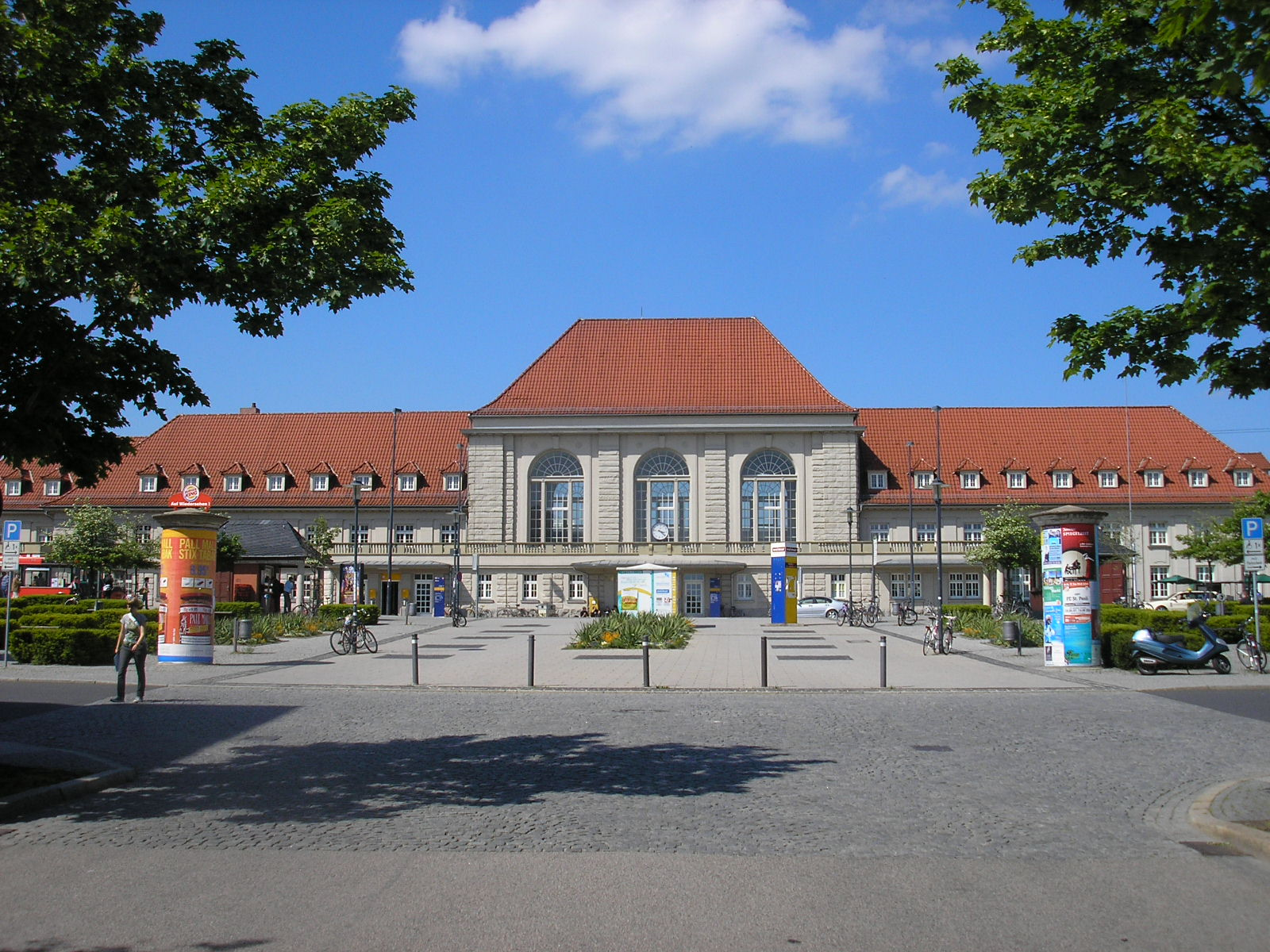
Weimar station

The line continues to the southwest past Saaleck, through a series of bends in the valley of the Ilm, which it crosses four times. The area around the town of Bad Sulza is also known as Thuringian Tuscany because its gently rolling hills with their vineyards and mild climate recalls Tuscany. The next major town on the Thuringian Railway is Apolda. Until 150 years ago it was still a small farming town with about 2,500 inhabitants, but the construction of the railway line and the growth of the textile industry gave an enormous boost to the town and by 1900 it had nearly 25,000 residents. Further southwest, the next Intercity-Express stop is reached at Weimar. The station, from which the Woodland Railway branches off to the east towards Jena and Gera, is relatively far from the inner city. In Weimar, the Thuringian Railway leaves the valley of the Ilm and initially runs west along the foot of the Ettersberg (Etter Mountain) and then through the flat Thuringian Basin, where, about 20 kilometres from Weimar, the line reaches Erfurt, the state capital of Thuringia. From Weimar the line is also part of the Mid-Germany Connection. In the Erfurt suburb of Vieselbach there is a rail freight centre on the line and east of Erfurt Hauptbahnhof there is a large marshalling yard and a freight yard. Just before the Hauptbahnhof, the new line from Halle/Leipzig, the Nordhausen–Erfurt railway and the Nordhausen-Erfurt railway connect to the Thuringian Railway from the north. Erfurt Hauptbahnhof was extensively remodelled from 2003 to 2008 as part of the building of a high-speed line from Nuremberg via Erfurt to Halle/Leipzig (see Erfurt–Leipzig/Halle high-speed railway and Nuremberg–Erfurt high-speed railway). The northern section between Erfurt and Halle/Leipzig was put into operation on 13 December 2015. The southern section to Nuremberg is expected to open at the timetable change in December 2017.

=== Erfurt–Neudietendorf ===
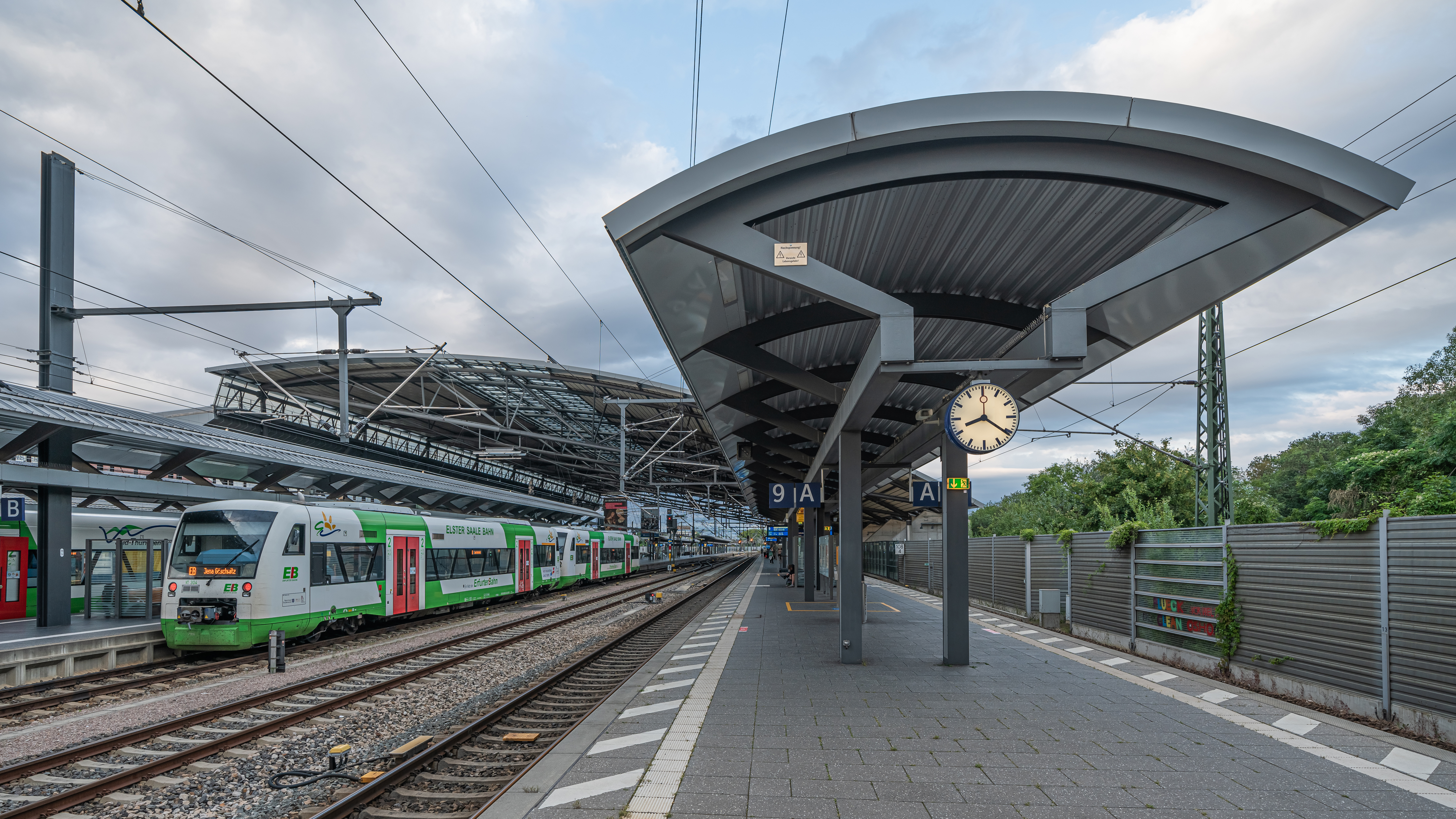
Erfurt Hauptbahnhof

This section is one of the busiest lines in Thuringia. The line here runs in the valleys of the Gera and the Apfelstädt. The 12 kilometre-long section was equipped with two additional tracks in 1910–1912 for freight traffic and a flying junction was built at Neudietendorf station towards Arnstadt on the Erfurt–Schweinfurt line. These tracks were dismantled in 1945 for reparations.

In 1967, the line was electrified and in 1975 part of a third track along with the flying junction were restored. Since 2005, the Nuremberg–Erfurt high-speed line has been under construction next to the line for the first few kilometres between Erfurt and the district of Bischleben.

=== Neudietendorf–Eisenach ===
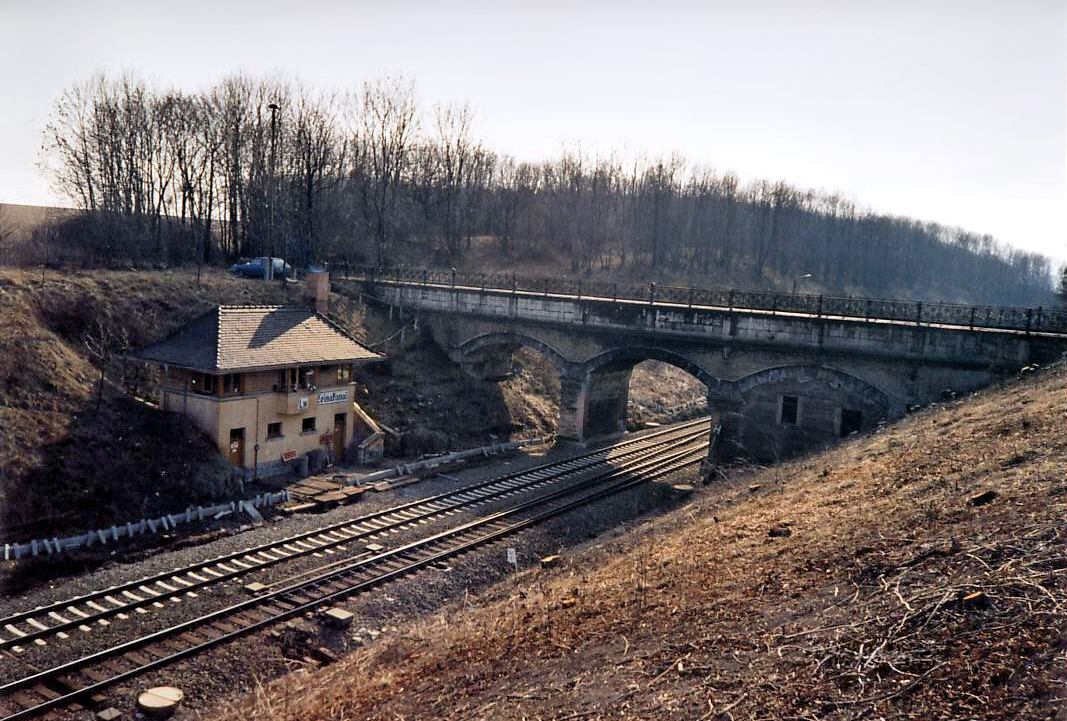
Leina Canal aqueduct in 1993

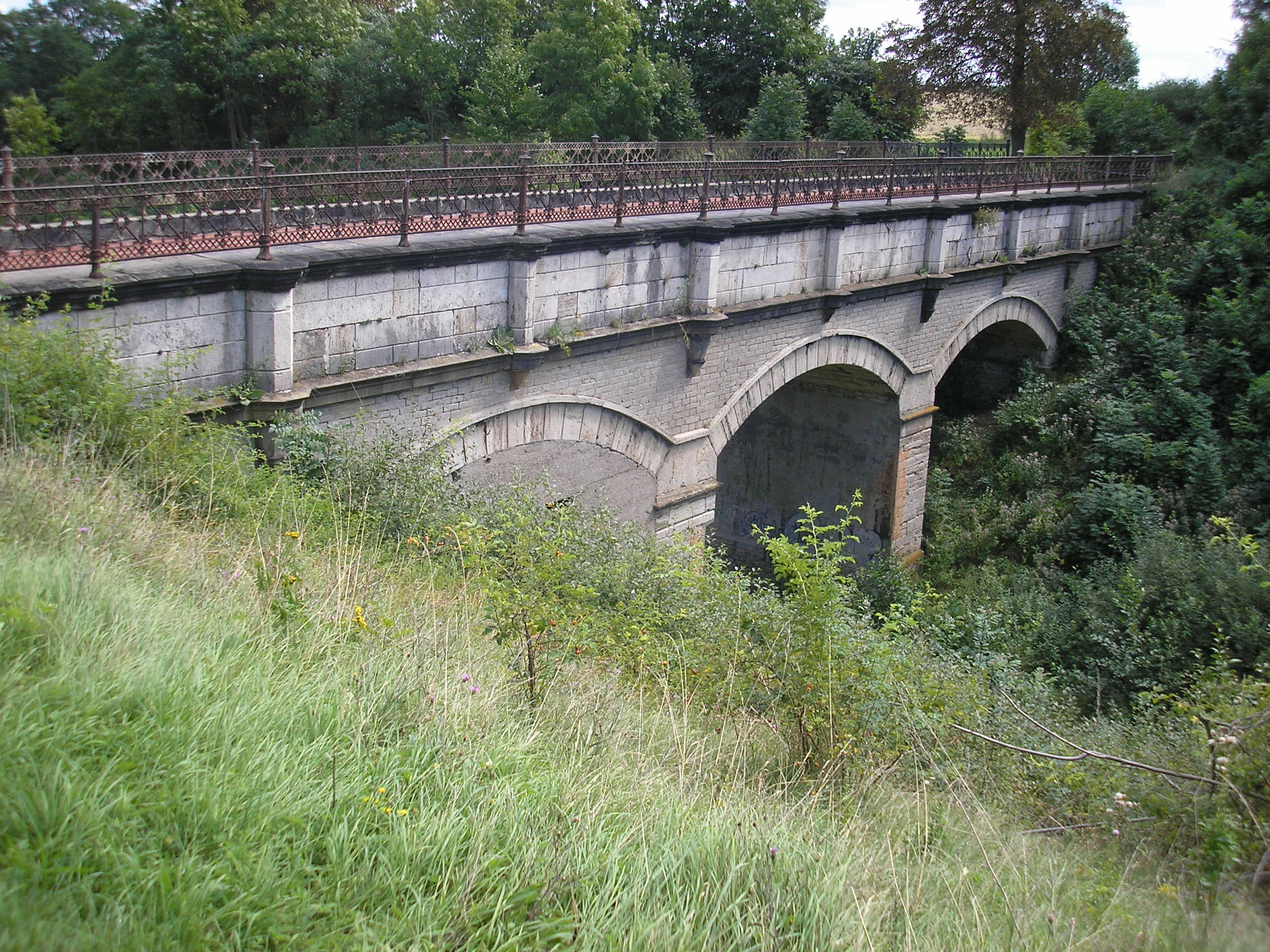
Current state of the aqueduct

West of Neudietendorf station, the line passes the Drei Gleichen ("three like") castles on its way towards Gotha, which is reached after passing through the Großen Seeberg hills. The western and central part of Gotha station were destroyed during the Second World War by bombing and were only partially rebuilt, so that the station building is now much smaller. On the forecourt of the station is the beginning of route of the Thuringian Forest Railway (Thüringerwaldbahn), an overland interurban tramway to Bad Tabarz via Waltershausen and Friedrichroda. In Gotha station, the Ohra Valley Railway branches off to Gräfenroda to the south and the Gotha–Leinefelde railway branches off to Göttingen in the north. The line reached the watershed between the Weser and Elbe rivers shortly after Gotha, at the 141.8 km mark. The line is 324.4 metres above sea level at its highest point. At the 142 km mark the line used to run under the Leina Canal aqueduct. Since this technical monument represented an obstacle to electrifying the line, it has been bypassed since 1994 by a new northerly route. This also increased the radius of curvature and the highest point was raised a few metres higher.

From 1912 there was an operations depot at the Leina Canal. Passenger trains stopped there on race days at the nearby Boxberg race course (an early English-style horse racing course) from sometime before 1945 until 1950. The Friedrichroda Railway branches off from Fröttstädt station to Friedrichroda and is the oldest branch line of Thuringia. The Thuringian Railway here runs in the valley of the Hörsel, until it reaches the Werra, which it follows past Eisenach. The line runs along the charming Hörsel valley between the Hörselberge range to the north and the Thuringian Forest to the south. Mechterstädt-Sättelstädt station emerged in the 1930s as a railway siding for the construction of the nearby A 4 autobahn. After the war, the Red Army used the northern part of the station to load and unload tanks for the nearby Kindel firing range until 1990. The line crosses the A 4, passes through the community of Wutha-Farnroda, where formerly the Ruhla Railway branched off, and finally reaches the city of Eisenach, which is the first Intercity-Express stop since Erfurt.

=== Eisenach–Gerstungen ===
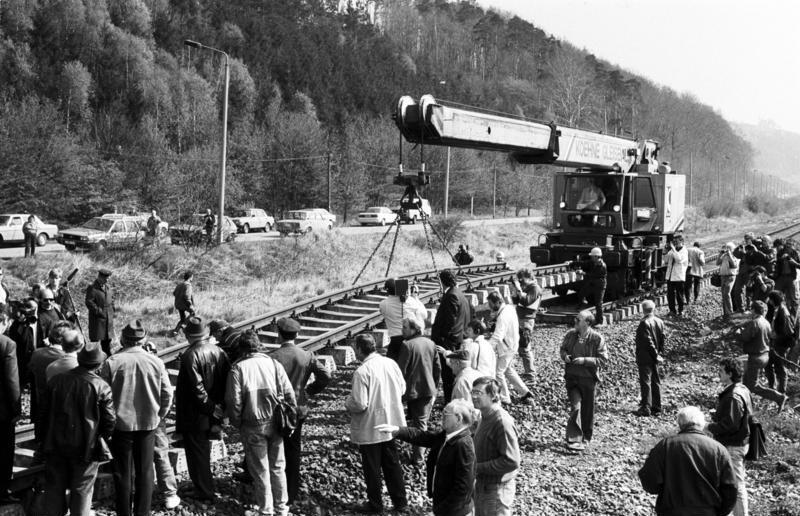
Reopening line at internal border in 1990, replacing detour

The Thuringian Railway leaves Eisenach to the west and reaches the Werra, which it crosses in Hörschel. At Herleshausen the line passes through Hessian territory for seven km, before returning to Thuringia and continuing to Gerstungen. The fact that the line crossed the Inner German border five-times during the division of Germany created security problems for the GDR. Until 1978, freight trains ran to Herleshausen, then the line was closed between Wartha and Gerstungen. For this reason, in the years 1961/1962, after the establishment of the Berlin Wall, a single-track detour line was built in East Germany, the Förtha–Gerstungen railway. At Förtha the line branched off the Werra Railway and ran to the east to connect with the Thuringian Railway in Gerstungen, bypassing the Herleshausen–Wommen section. In July 1988, the old line was made impassable at the border by the dismantling of approximately 100 m of the track immediately next to the border. It was not until 1991, after reunification, that the old Thuringian Railway main line was rebuilt; it was put back into operation on 25 May 1991. Subsequently, the bypass line was shut down and dismantled.

=== Gerstungen–Bebra ===
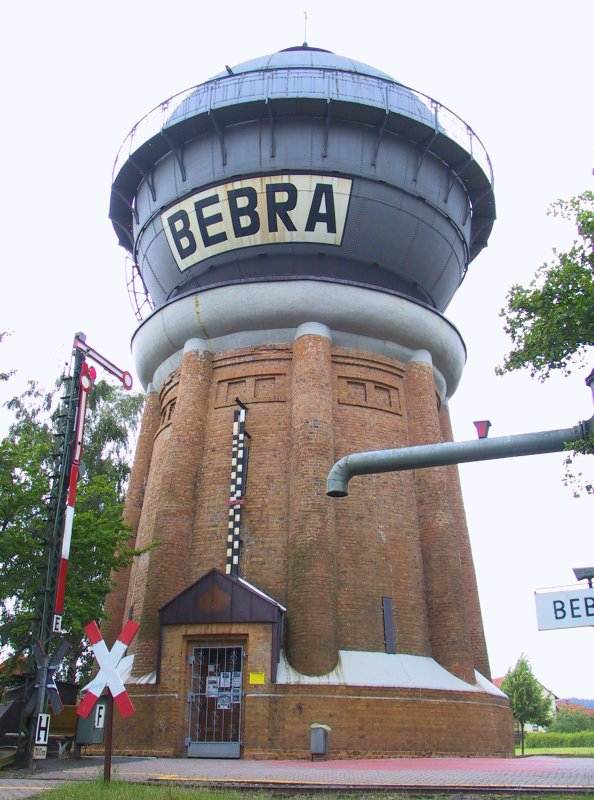
Water tower in Bebra

After the inauguration of the railway in 1849, Gerstungen was an interchange station between the Thuringian Railway and the Frederick William Northern Railway (Friedrich-Wilhelms-Nordbahn). From 1946, it was the border station between the Reichsbahndirektion (railway division, Rbd) Erfurt and the Rbd Kassel as well as between East Germany and West Germany. Also in Gerstungen a branch line branches off through the Werra valley via Heringen and Vacha to Bad Salzungen (today the line is only open to Heimboldhausen, where it connects to Unterbreizbach). It is particularly important for the potash industry (K+S). In Gerstungen the Thuringian railway leaves the valley of the Werra and rises to the Hönebach Tunnel, which is on the watershed between the Werra and Fulda. The maximum speed is 90 km/h because of the narrow width of the tunnel. West of the tunnel, the line runs through Ronshausen in the valley between the Seulingswald forest in the south and the Richelsdorf Hills in the north to Bebra where it ends at the lines to Frankfurt, Göttingen and Kassel.

==== Berlin curve ====
Since 1914, there has been a connecting curve from the former Faßdorf junction (206.39 km) to the North–South railway from Bebra to Bad Hersfeld, which removed reversal in Bebra for trains from Erfurt to Frankfurt. Until 1952 there was an additional third track from Faßdorf up to Hönebach Tunnel because of the 1.1 percent grade. After 1945, the connecting curve was no longer used because it was normally required for locomotives to be changed in Bebra. In 1989, a bridge on the curve was closed as it had fallen into disrepair. With the modernisation of the line after 1990, this section was repaired and put back into operation.

== Accidents ==
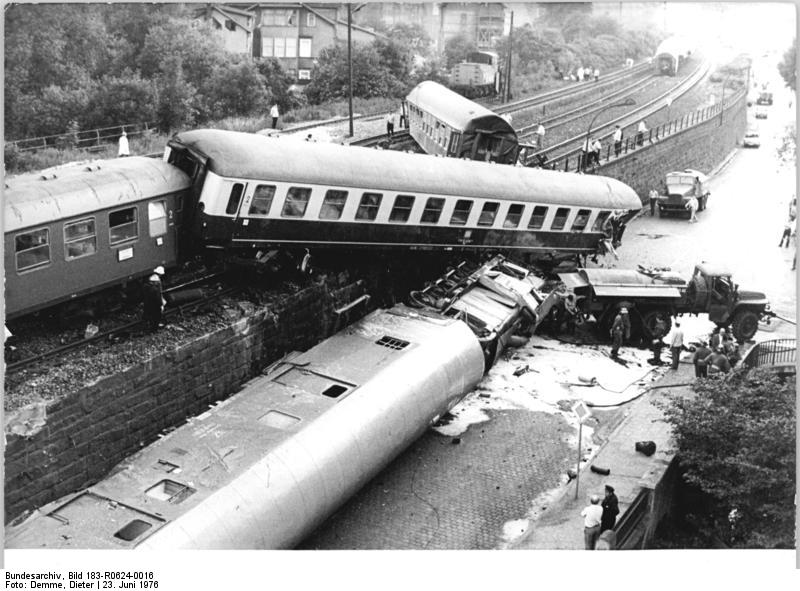
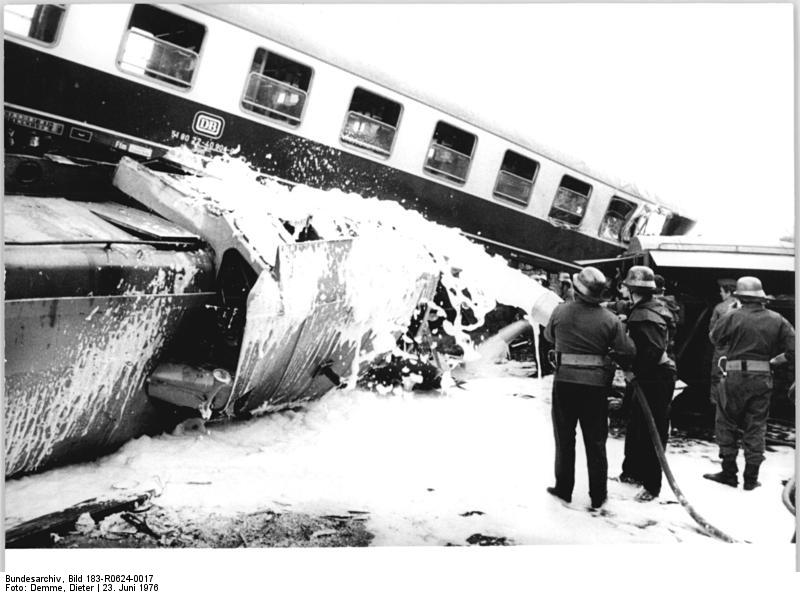
Pictures of 1976 accident
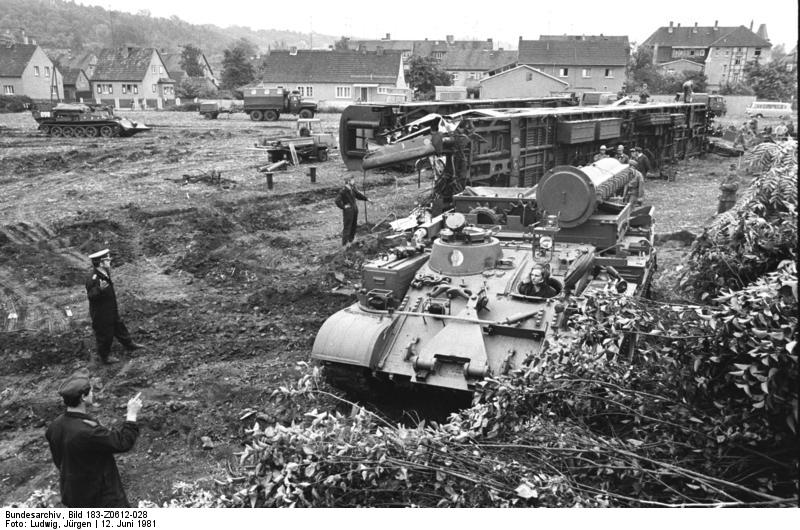
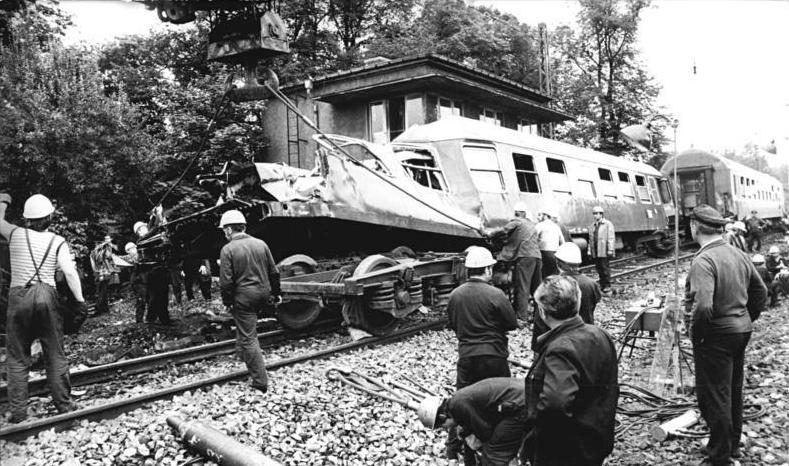
Pictures of 1981 accident
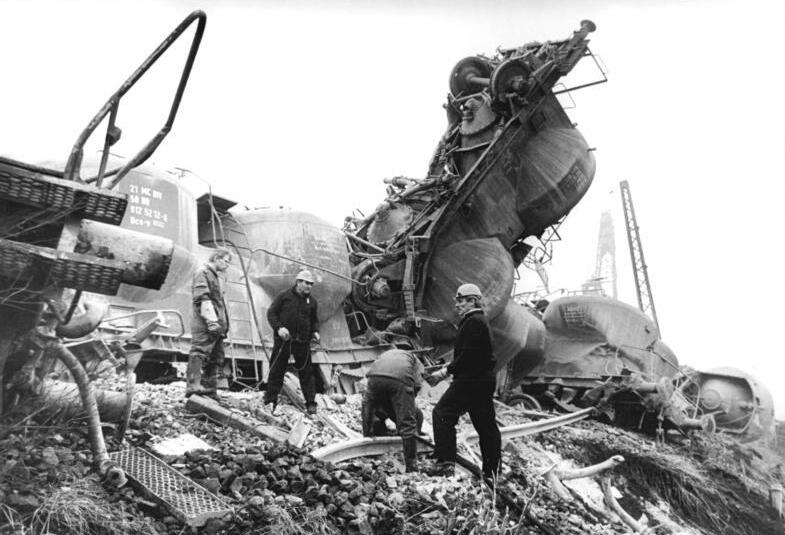
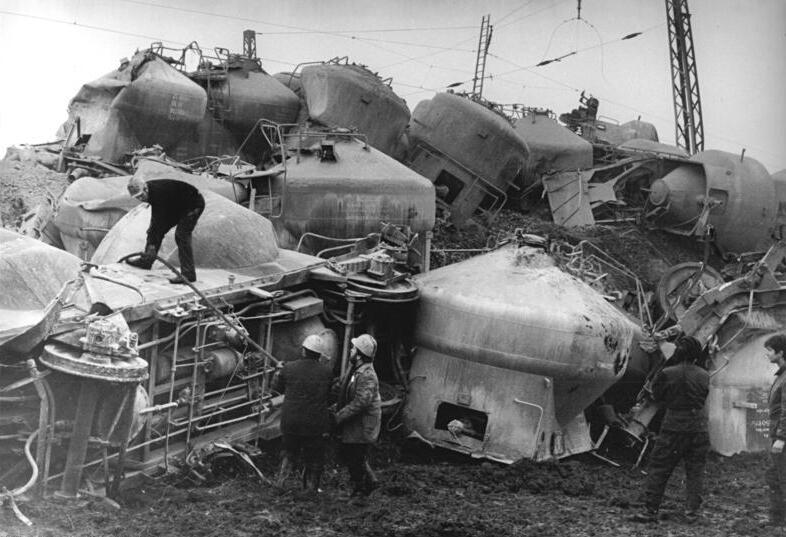
Pictures of 1986 accident

On 24 December 1935, there was a train crash between an express train and a passenger train in the entry area of Großheringen station on the Saale bridge. 34 people were killed and 27 were seriously injured.

Early in the morning of 29 January 1962, the D 28 express train from Berlin to Eisenach was involved in an accident at Mechterstädt-Sättelstädt station. The locomotive, the sleeping car and two passenger cars of the D 28 were derailed, 27 passengers and railway staff were injured and there was enormous property damage. The state-controlled GDR media concealed the incident and it was only mentioned in a three-line note in a local newspaper. The accident was caused by a dispatcher error and by capacity bottlenecks. The train collided in the station area with an unscheduled freight train containing twenty gravel wagons and operated by the DR rail construction branch in Bitterfeld; this was also travelling towards Eisenach. Because of defects in the track on the Fröttstädt–Mechterstädt-Sättelstädt section, the arriving express was only running at 50 km/h, but the locomotive was only 50 m from the obstacle before the driver recognised the situation and could initiate the emergency brakes and trigger an emergency signal.

On 23 June 1976 at about 17:25, the international express D 354, running from Berlin to Paris crashed at the western end of Eisenach station. The locomotive, a V180 and two following carriages remained on the tracks after passing over a defective set of points, but the following cars derailed and collided with a postal wagon and a shunting locomotive running on the adjacent track. The postal wagon and the shunting locomotive crashed onto a road next to the railway embankment. A total of about 30 staff and passengers were injured.

On 11 June 1981 at 16:50, the D 1453 express from Düsseldorf to Chemnitz (then Karl-Marx-Stadt) crashed in Erfurt-Bischleben station. Due to a buckle in the track due to heat, two carriages of the train crashed down a slope and a carriage collided against the signal box. 14 passengers were killed and 93 were seriously injured.

A freight train derailed on the night of 13 March 1986 on the Halle–Erfurt railway near the station of Leissling, in the former district of Weissenfels (now part of Burgenlandkreis); it contained 26 wagons laden with cement, some of which were derailed. Nobody was injured, but significant damage occurred to the track and overhead wire. The cause of the accident was a broken wheel on a freight wagon.
