= Wartha (Eisenach) =

Town in Thuringia, Germany

Coordinates: 50°59′45″N 10°12′14″E

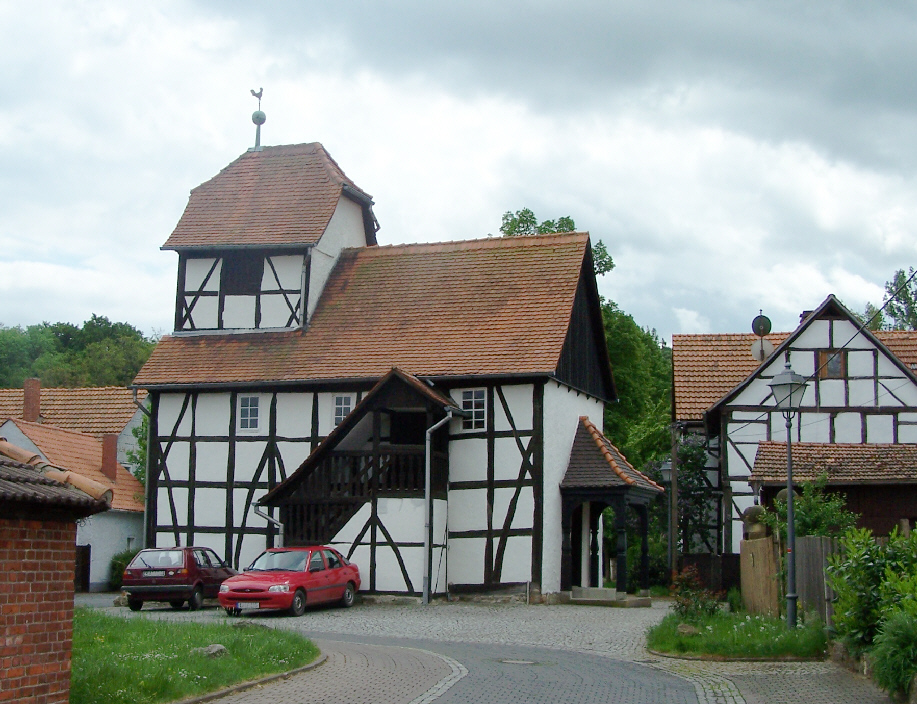
Church in Wartha.

Wartha is a town in the subdivision of Wartha-Göringen which forms part of the independent-city district of Eisenach in Thuringia state, Germany.

Near Wartha was a former major road border crossing on the Inner German border between East and West Germany. The crossing was known as Herleshausen-Wartha, with Herleshausen being the first town across the border in Hesse.

== Neighboring municipalities and cities ==
To the west of Wartha is the Hessian town Herleshausen. To the north and the east are the towns of Neuenhof and Hörschel while Göringen in the south.

== Gallery ==
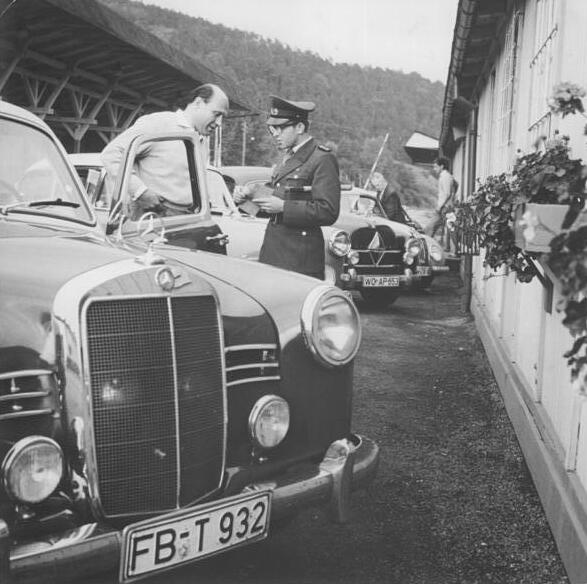
Wartha checkpoint in 1960.

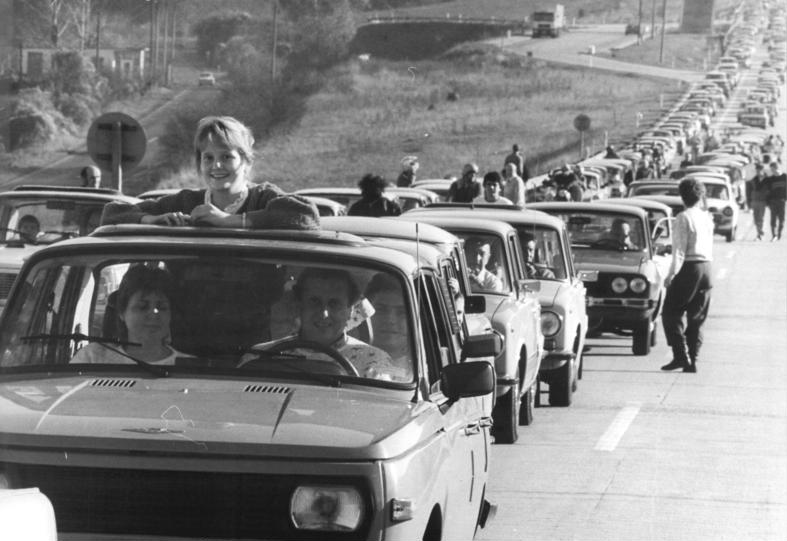
Long queues of cars waiting to cross the Wartha border crossing into West Germany on 10 November 1989, a day after the fall of the Berlin Wall.

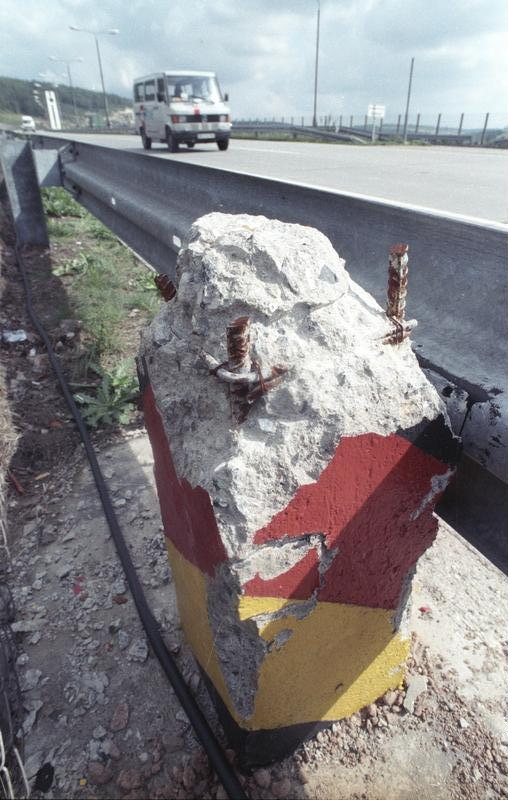
Demolished East German boundary pillar.

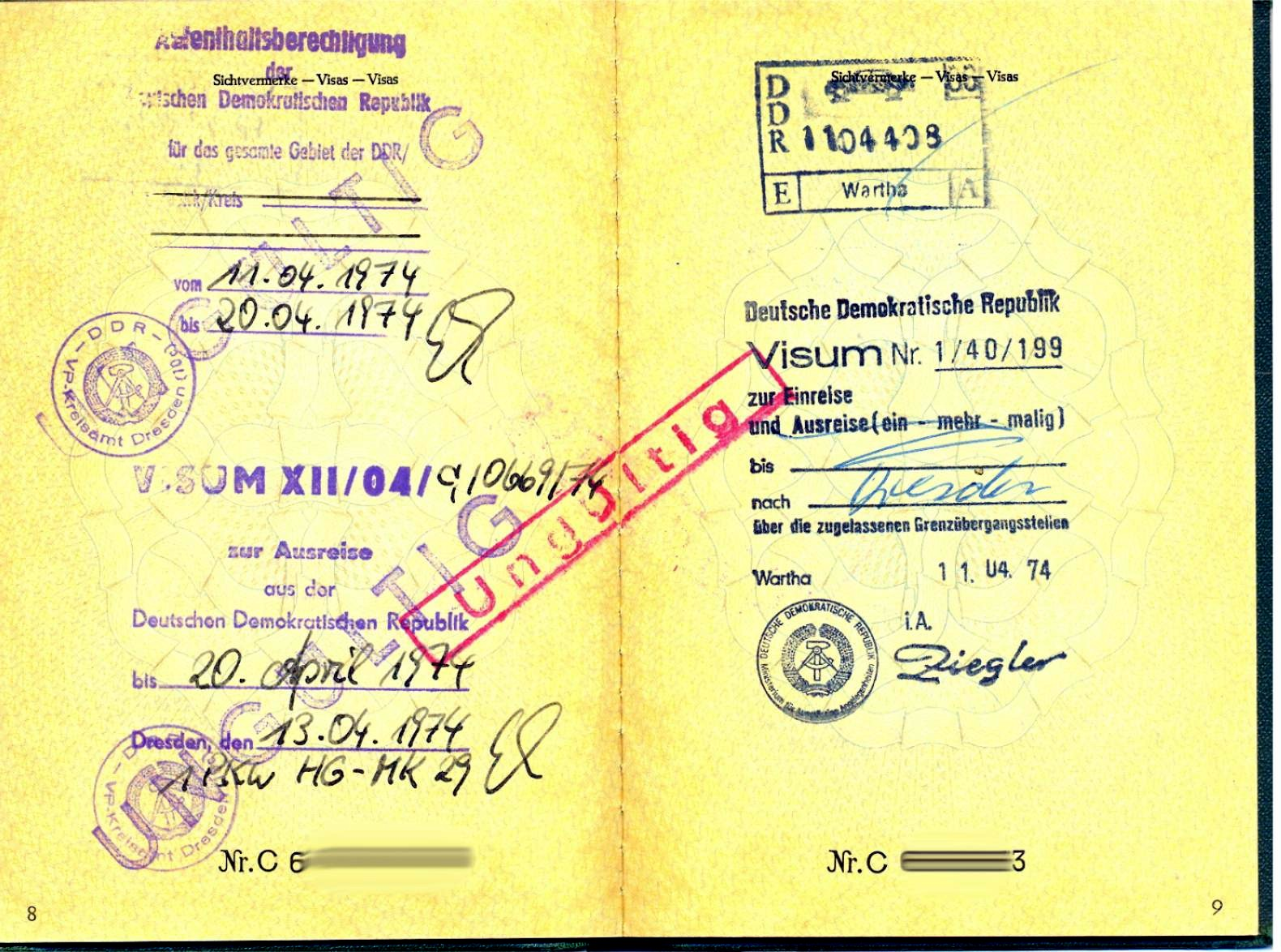
An East German visa with a stamp from Wartha from the 1970s.

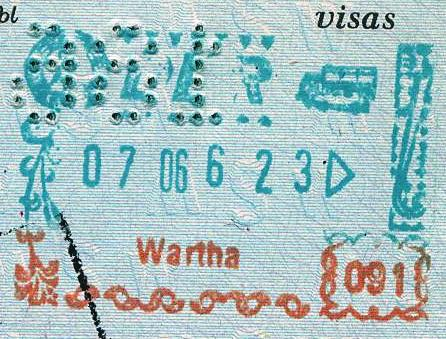
East German passport stamp from Wartha.
