= Wolfsburg-Unkeroda =

- Ortsteil of Gerstungen
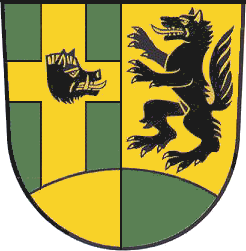
- Coat of arms
- Interactive map of Wolfsburg-Unkeroda
- Location within Germany Location within Thuringia
- Coordinates: 50°56′18″N 10°16′3″E
- Country: Germany
- State: Thuringia
- District: Wartburgkreis
- Municipality: Gerstungen

Area
  - Total: 9.04 km^{2} (3.49 sq mi)
- Elevation: 303 m (994 ft)

Population (2016-12-31)
  - Total: 706
  - Density: 78.1/km^{2} (202/sq mi)
- Time zone: UTC+01:00 (CET)
  - Summer (DST): UTC+02:00 (CEST)
- Postal codes: 99819
- Dialling codes: 036925
- Vehicle registration: WAK
- Website: www.wolfsburg-unkeroda.de

Wolfsburg-Unkeroda is a former municipality in the Wartburgkreis district of Thuringia, Germany. Since July 2018, it is part of the municipality Gerstungen.
