= Gerstungen =

- Municipality
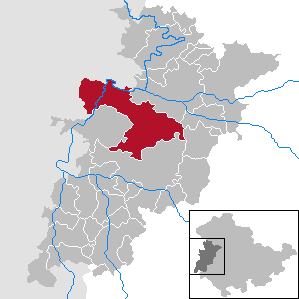
- Location of Gerstungen within Wartburgkreis district
- Interactive map of Gerstungen
- Location within Germany Location within Thuringia
- Coordinates: 50°57′45″N 10°3′35″E
- Country: Germany
- State: Thuringia
- District: Wartburgkreis

Government
  - Mayor (2024–30): Daniel Steffan (CDU)

Area
  - Total: 149.98 km^{2} (57.91 sq mi)
- Elevation: 205 m (673 ft)

Population (2025-12-31)
  - Total: 8,884
  - Density: 59.23/km^{2} (153.4/sq mi)
- Time zone: UTC+01:00 (CET)
  - Summer (DST): UTC+02:00 (CEST)
- Postal codes: 99834
- Dialling codes: 036922
- Vehicle registration: WAK, EA, SLZ
- Website: www.gerstungen.de

Gerstungen (German pronunciation: [ˈɡɛʁstʊŋən]) is a municipality in the Wartburgkreis district of Thuringia, Germany. It is 42 kilometers southwest of the geographic center of Germany, located in Niederdorla. In July 2018 the former municipalities of Marksuhl and Wolfsburg-Unkeroda were merged into Gerstungen.

== History ==
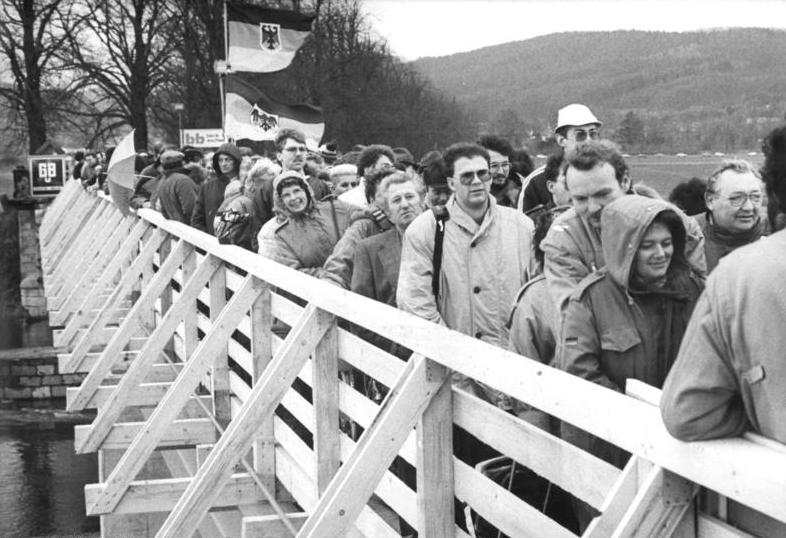
A new border crossing for pedestrians across the Inner German border linking Lauchröden in Gerstungen municipality, and Herleshausen. This temporary bridge was built immediately after the reopening of the border at the site of an old bridge across the Werra which was destroyed in the Second World War. Here, visitors are queueing to enter East Germany on 23 December 1989.

Between 1945 and 1990, Gerstungen station served as East German inner German border crossing on the Thuringian Railway. The crossing was open for trains travelling between the Soviet Zone of occupation in Germany (till 1949, thereafter the East German Democratic Republic, or West Berlin and the American zone of occupation (till 1949) and thereafter the West German Federal Republic of Germany. The traffic was subject to the Interzonal traffic regulations, that between West Germany and West Berlin followed the special regulations of the Transit Agreement (1972).

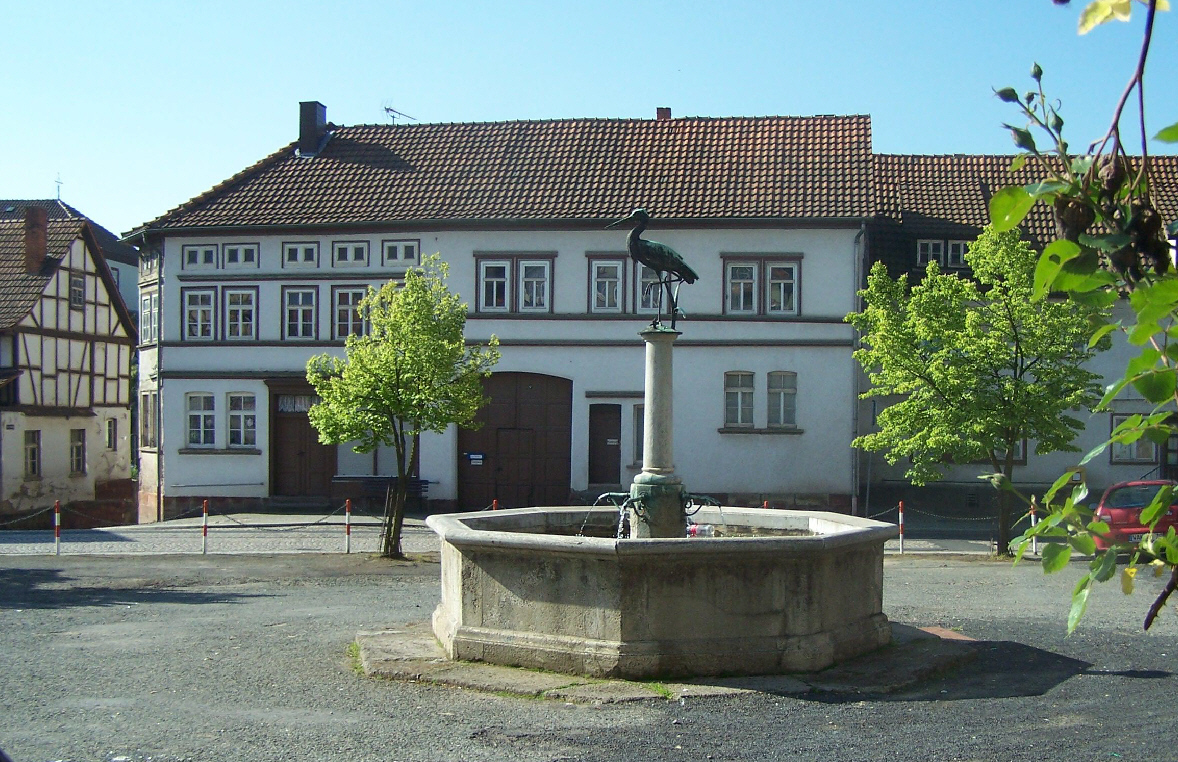
Market place
