= Herleshausen =

- Municipality
- Coat of arms

- Location of Herleshausen within Werra-Meißner-Kreis district
- Interactive map of Herleshausen
- Location within Germany Location within Hesse
- Coordinates: 51°01′N 10°10′E
- Country: Germany
- State: Hesse
- Admin. region: Kassel
- District: Werra-Meißner-Kreis
- Subdivisions: 11 districts

Government
  - Mayor (2018–24): Lars Böckmann

Area
  - Total: 59.5 km^{2} (23.0 sq mi)
- Elevation: 363 m (1,191 ft)

Population (2025-12-31)
  - Total: 2,582
  - Density: 43.4/km^{2} (112/sq mi)
- Time zone: UTC+01:00 (CET)
  - Summer (DST): UTC+02:00 (CEST)
- Postal codes: 37293
- Dialling codes: 05654
- Vehicle registration: ESW
- Website: www.herleshausen.de

Herleshausen (German pronunciation: [hɛʁləsˈhaʊzn̩]) is a municipality in the Werra-Meißner-Kreis in Hesse, Germany.

Following the 2022 Census updates, official projections from the Hessen Agency in late 2025 indicate a continued moderate population decline for Herleshausen through 2040, consistent with regional demographic trends in Northern Hesse.

== Geography ==
=== Location ===
Herleshausen lies north of a section of the boundary with Thuringia in the thickly wooded area between the Ringgau and the Thuringian Forest (ranges) with the Thuringian Forest Nature Park in the southeast. It is found between the river Werra in the south and the Autobahn A 4 (Aachen–Görlitz) in the north.

Herleshausen borders on the municipal area of the district-free town of Eisenach, whose main centre lies some 12 km east-southeast. To the district seat of Eschwege to the north-northwest, it is about 22 km, and to Kassel, the nearest city, to the northwest, it is about 60 km (each time as the crow flies).

=== Neighbouring communities ===
Herleshausen borders in the north on the communities of Ringgau (Werra-Meißner-Kreis) and Ifta (Wartburgkreis in Thuringia), in the east on the town of Creuzburg and the community of Krauthausen (both in the Wartburgkreis), in the southeast on the Thuringian district-free town of Eisenach, in the south on the community of Gerstungen (Wartburgkreis) and in the west on the town of Sontra (Werra-Meißner-Kreis).

=== Constituent communities ===
The community's eleven Ortsteile are Herleshausen, Wommen, Nesselröden, Breitzbach, Unhausen, Holzhausen, Markershausen, Altefeld, Archfeld, Willershausen and Frauenborn.

== History ==
In 1019, Herleshausen had its first documentary mention in a donation document in which ownership was transferred to the Kaufungen Abbey, which then held the village until Secularization in 1521. Thereafter, it passed to the Landgraves of Hesse-Kassel, who enfeoffed various lords with it.

The community found itself on a much more public stage after the Second World War when a border checkpoint between East and West Germany was built near Herleshausen. Many prisoner exchanges between the two German states took place during the Cold War at the border checkpoint, including German soldiers returning from Soviet captivity and East German citizens traded to West Germany in return for hard currency and goods.

== Politics ==
=== Community council ===
The municipal election held on 26 March 2006 yielded the following results:

Parties and voter communities		% 2006	Seats; 2006	% 2001	Seats; 2001
CDU	Christian Democratic Union of Germany	32.4	6	30.7	6
SPD	Social Democratic Party of Germany	49.1	9	53.3	10
WSRG	Wählergemeinschaft Südringgau	18.5	4	16.0	3
Total		100.0	19	100.0	19
Voter turnout in %		65.0		66.9	

=== Town partnerships ===
- Cléder, Finistère, France
- (Germany) Lauchröden, constituent community of Gerstungen, Thuringia

=== Coat of arms ===
The community's arms might be described thus: Gules a wall embattled with two end towers with pointed roofs argent and with closed gate Or, above which a tower with a double cupola of the second.

The crenellated wall stands for the fortress church estate, which has the parish church's quire tower rising above it. The tinctures red and silver are Hesse's state colours. The coat of arms was approved in 1954 by the Hesse Interior Ministry.

== Culture and sightseeing ==
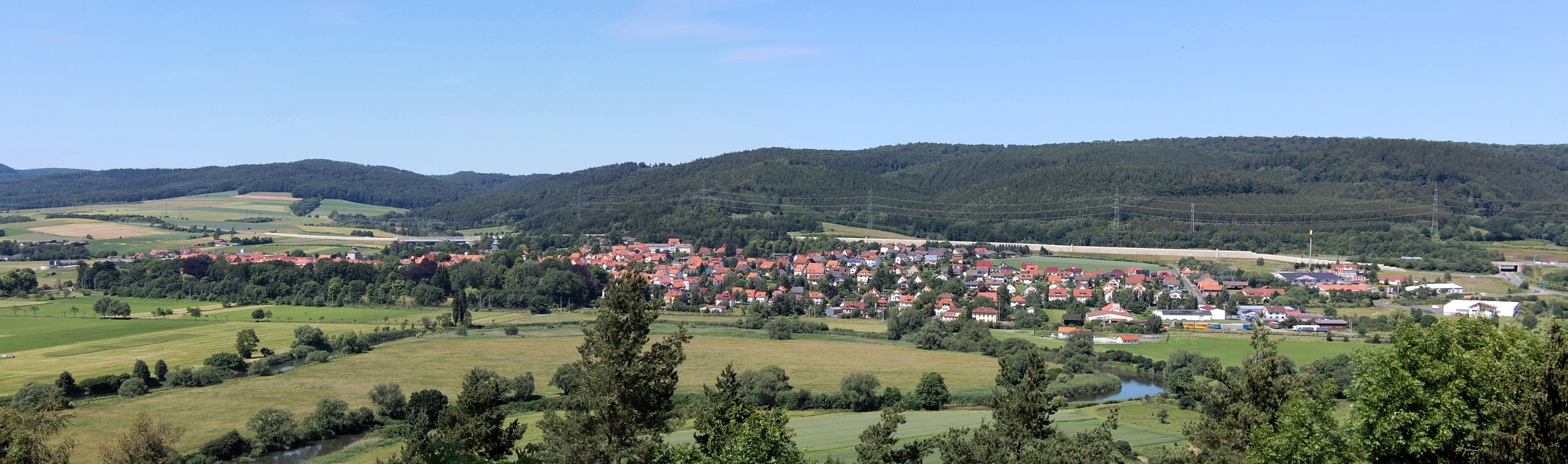
Panoramic view of Herleshausen

=== Buildings ===
==== Schloss Augustenau ====
After the Reformation was introduced and Hesse's monasteries were secularized, Philip I, Landgrave of Hesse enfeoffed with the Herleshausen estate his troop leader Georg von Reckerode, who built himself the "Steinstock" palace there in 1539. After Reckerode's death in 1558, he was followed as fiefholder by the family von Wersebe, who enlarged the complex by building two wings onto it. When the Wersebes' male line died out in 1678, the palace and the Herleshausen estate passed back to Charles I, Landgrave of Hesse-Kassel, who transferred it to his brother Philipp, first as a fief, and later to have as his own. Thereafter, the palace and the Herleshausen estate were held by the family Hesse-Philippsthal-Barchfeld. In 1821, the palace was given the name "Augustenau", after Landgrave Charles's recently deceased consort Auguste von Hohenlohe-Ingelfingen.

== Economy and infrastructure ==
=== Transport ===
Herleshausen has a railway station on the Thüringer Bahn railway between Eisenach and Bebra. Here, the last prisoners of war were released after Konrad Adenauer's visit to Moscow in 1955.

Running by the community is a section of the Autobahn A 4 (Aachen–Görlitz) with its Herleshausen interchange. The Herleshausen service centre was torn down in 2005 to make way for the 6-lane expansion. There are, however, new plans to build another service centre, "Werratal", on the A 4's south side.

== Notable people ==
- D.L. Lang - Poet Laureate of Vallejo, California
- Dirk Wilutzky - Academy award-winning filmmaker

== Gallery ==
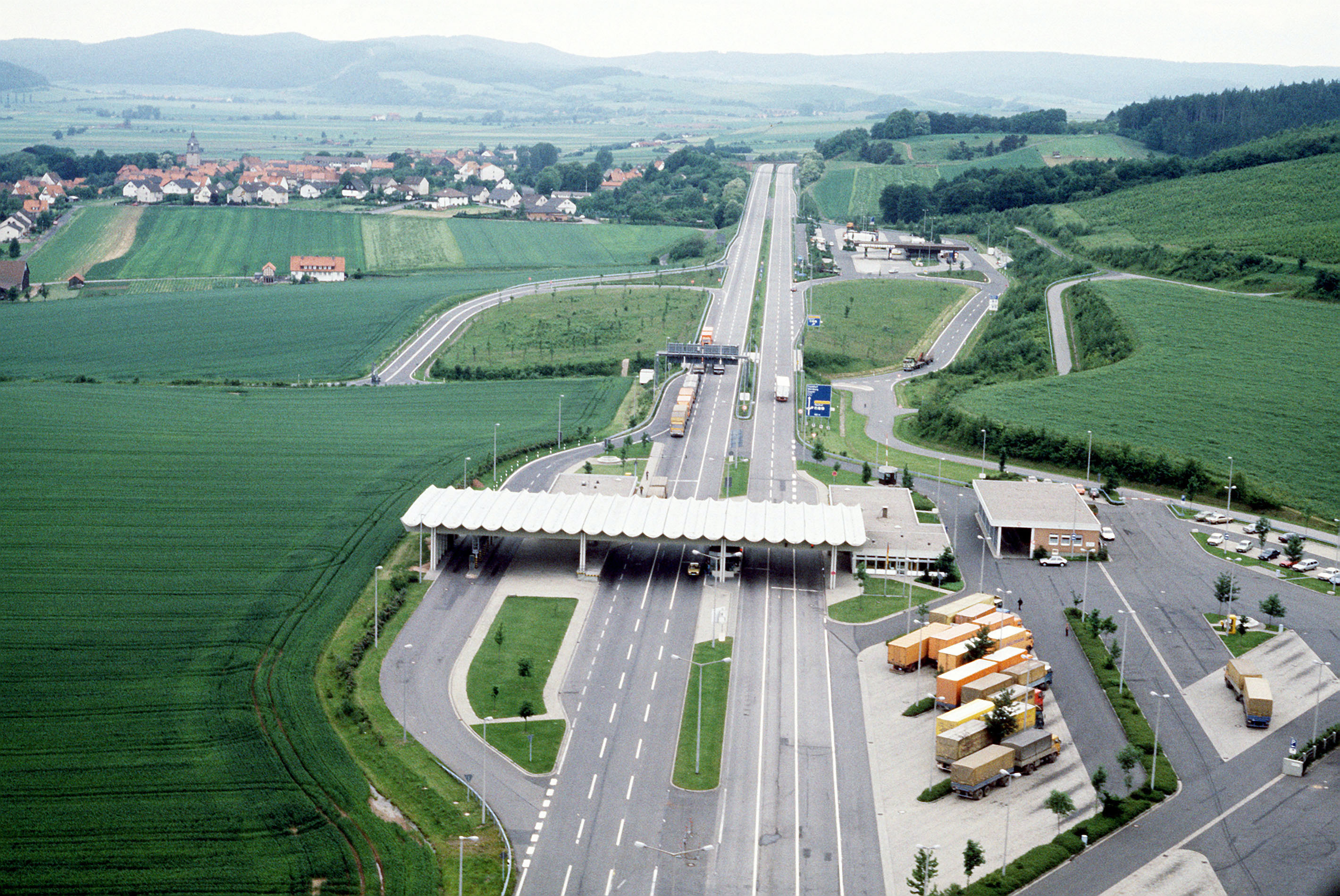
The former Herleshausen border crossing on the Inner German border, looking into West Germany

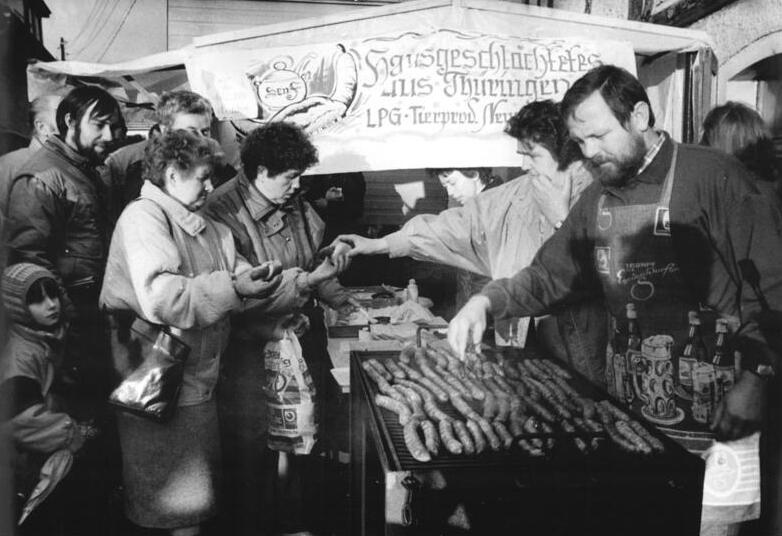
Border crossers being treated to free sausages, sandwiches, wine, coffee and cake on the Thuringian side of the new border crossing between Herleshausen and Lauchröden in Eisenach in December 1989

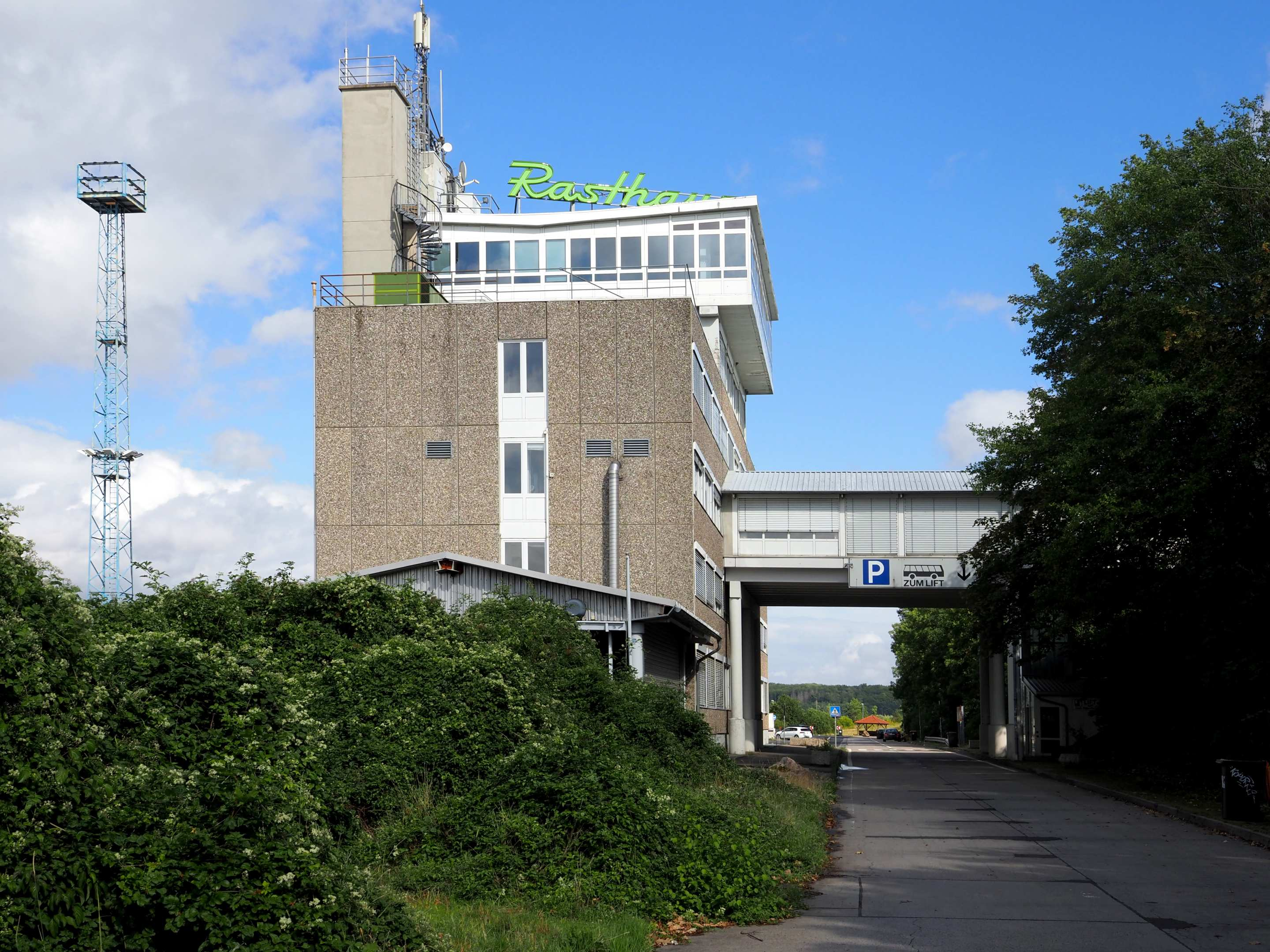
Former border guard base, converted to a rest area restaurant, now in disuse
