= Ellenbogen (Rhön) =

Mountain in Thuringia, Germany

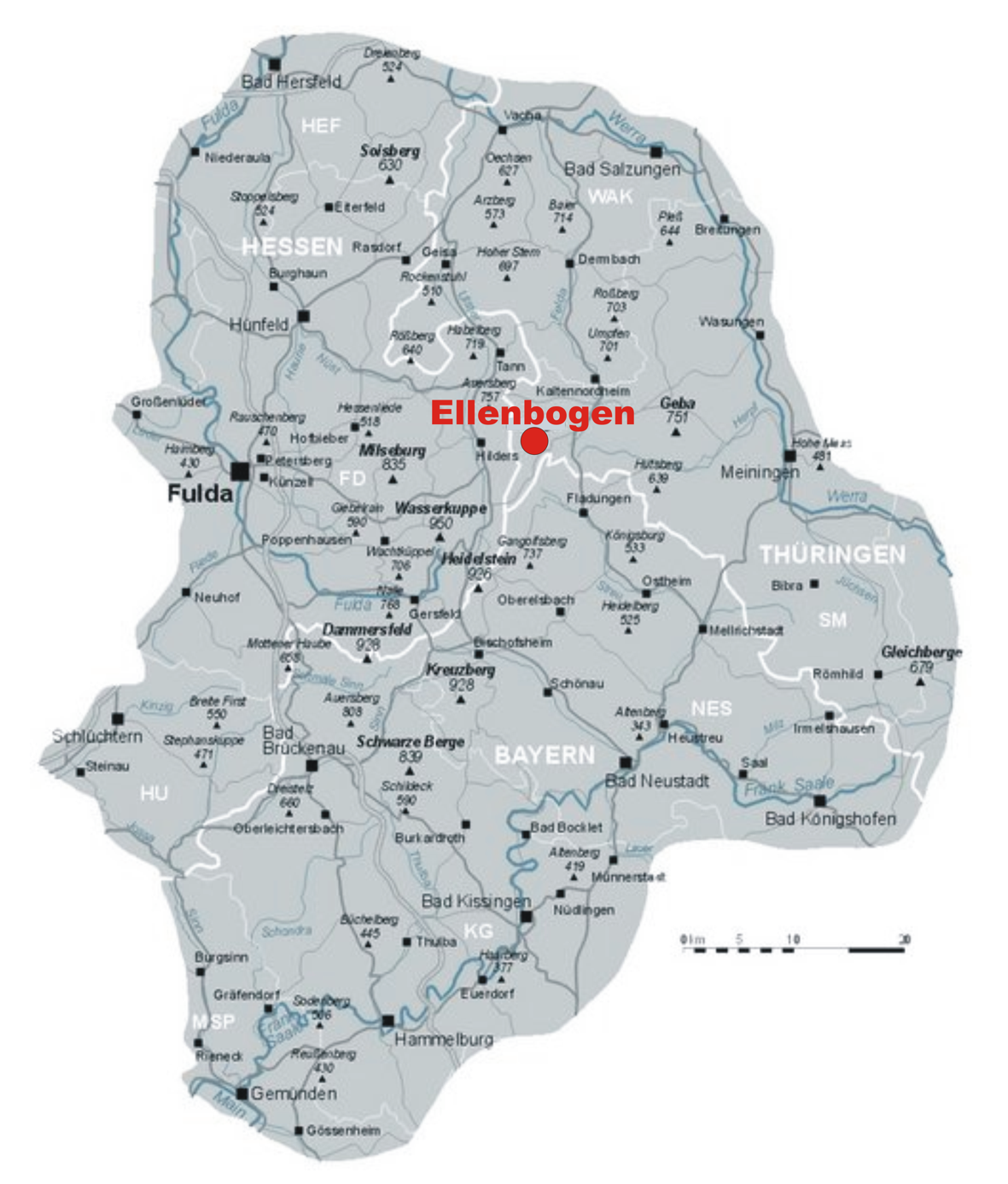
- Location of the Ellenbogen in the Rhön Mountains

Highest point
- Elevation: 814 m (2,671 ft)
- Coordinates: 50°34′22″N 10°5′0″E

Geography
- Location: Thuringia
- Parent range: Rhön Mountains

Geology
- Mountain type: Extinct volcano

The Ellenbogen is an 814-metre high extinct volcano in the Thuringian Rhön in the district of Landkreis Schmalkalden-Meiningen, Thuringia, Germany.

== Location ==
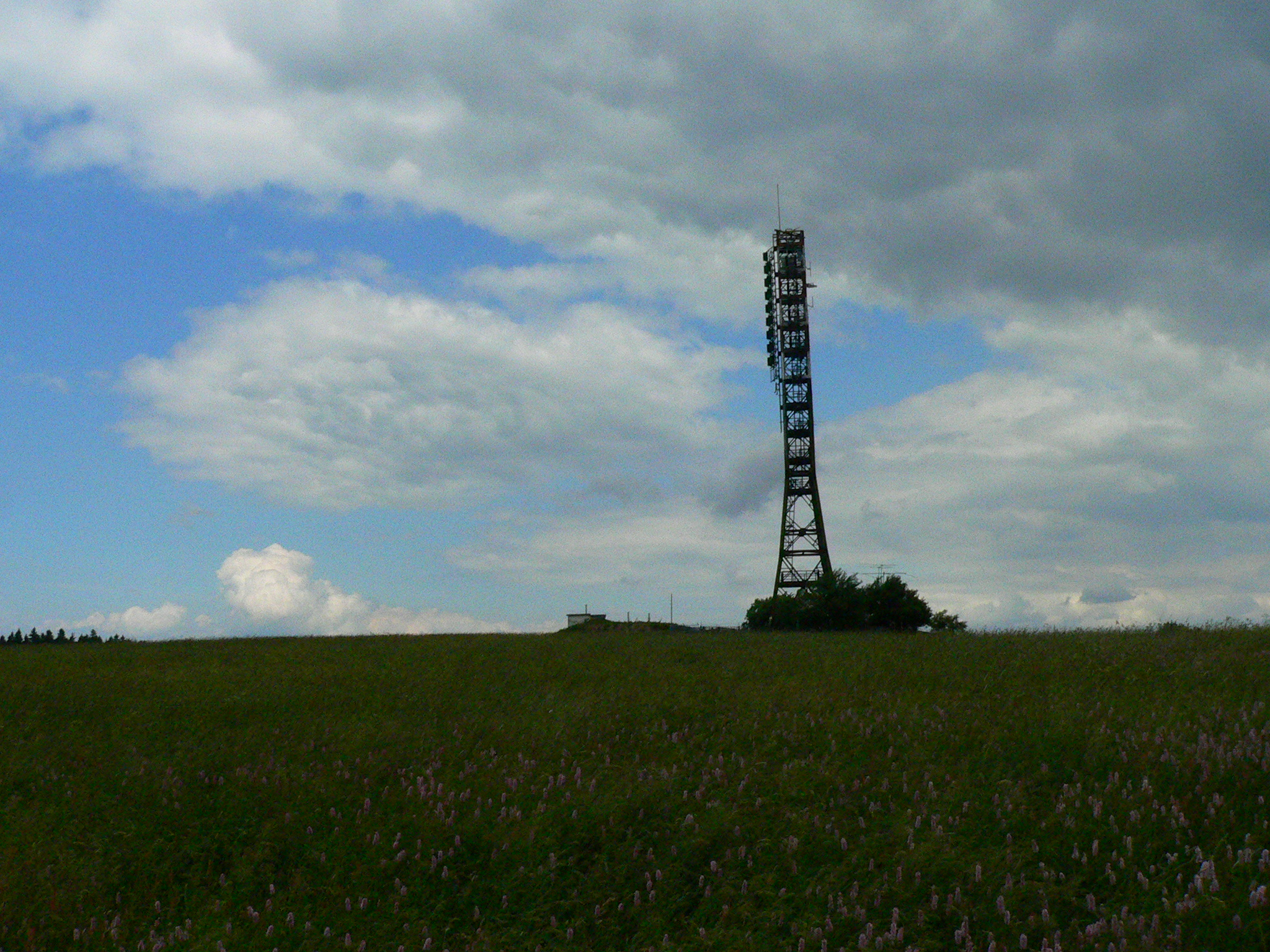
Transmission site on the Schnitzersberg, 1.5 km south of the Ellenbogen

The Ellenbogen rises between the villages of Oberweid, Frankenheim and Reichenhausen in the Rhön Biosphere Reserve, and belongs to the municipality of Oberweid. As with most of the Rhön Mountains its summit is more of a gently curving plateau. Near its highest point are the dwellings of Eisenacher Haus and Thüringer Rhönhaus. From the hill summit there is a good view over the Hohe Rhön ("High Rhön"), the Milseburg and the Wasserkuppe, the latter being the highest mountain in the range. One and a half kilometres south of the Ellenbogen, the Ellenbogen Plateau climbs to a small rise that is 2 metres higher than the official summit. This rise is the 815.5 m high Schnitzersberg, which is the highest mountain in the Thuringian Rhön. In spite of that some maps give the height of the Ellenbogen as 816 metres as well.

== See also ==
- Rhön Mountains
- List of mountains and hills of the Rhön

== Sources ==
- Rhönklub e.V. (publ.), Durch die Rhön, 2001, Verlag Parzeller Fulda, ISBN 3-7900-0327-1, pp. 102 ff
- Rhönklub e.V. (publ.), Schneiders Rhönführer, 2005, Verlag Parzeller Fulda, ISBN 3-7900-0365-4, p. 273
