= Felda =

Felda may refer to:

- Felda (Ohm), a river of Hesse, Germany
- Felda (Werra), a river of Thuringia, Germany
- Felda, Florida, an unincorporated community in Hendry County, Florida
- Felda United F.C., a Malaysian football club
- Federal Land Development Authority (FELDA), Malaysia
