= Kreuzberg Group =

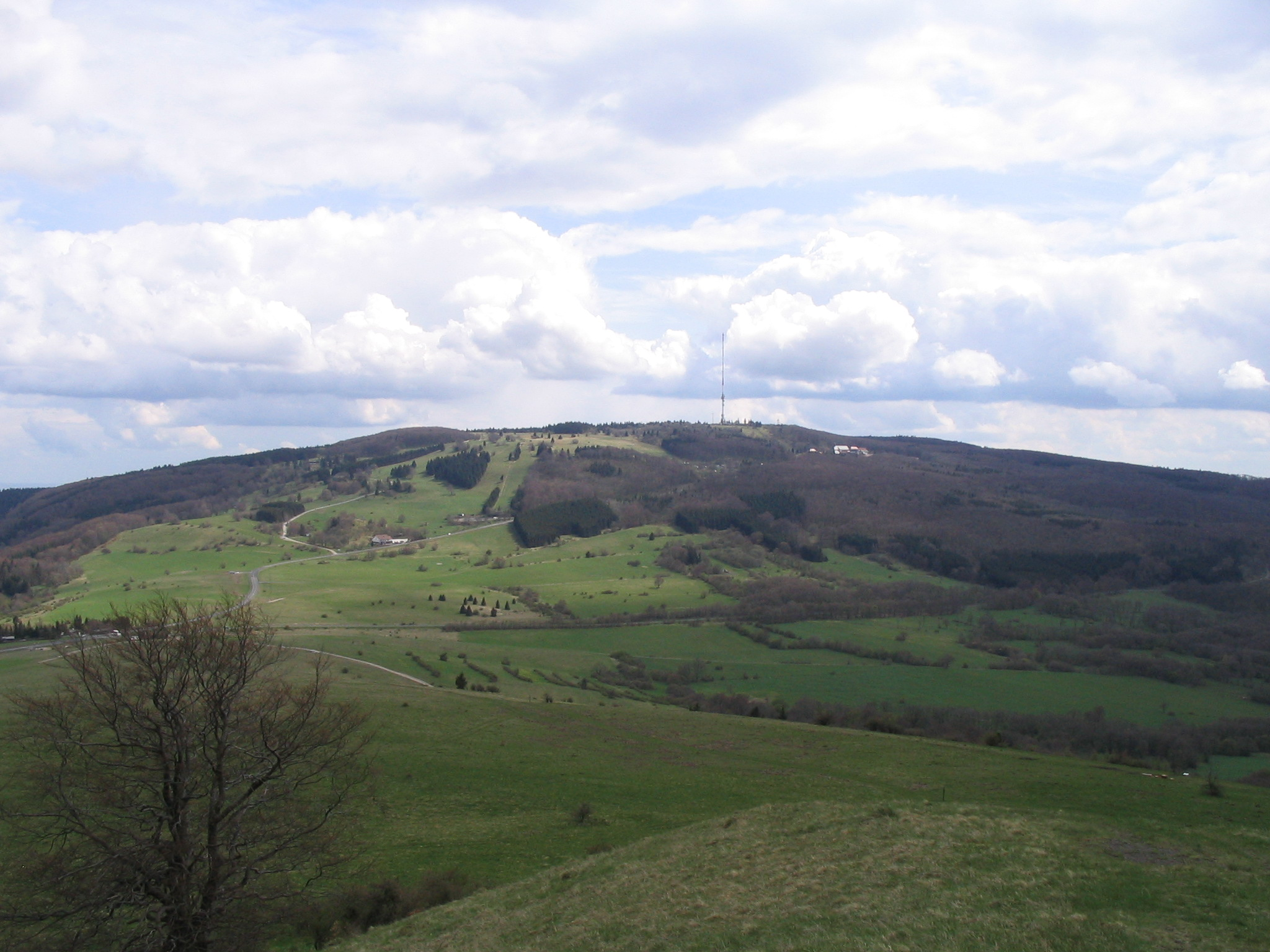
- The Kreuzberg from the north

Highest point
- Peak: Kreuzberg
- Elevation: 928 m (3,045 ft)

Geography
- State(s): Counties of Bad Kissingen and Rhön-Grabfeld, Bavaria Germany
- Range coordinates: 50°22′12″N 9°58′48″E
- Parent range: Southern High Rhön, High Rhön, Rhön

The Kreuzberg Group is a small range of low mountains in northern Bavaria, Germany, which is named after its highest peak, the Kreuzberg (928 m). The group is part of the Southern High Rhön, which is in turn part of the High Rhön, a mountain region within the East Hesse Highlands. The natural region is drained by the Sinn in the west, the Brend in the east and the Schmalwasserbach and Kellersbach in the south. The mountains form part of the Central Upland range known as the Rhön Mountains.

== Natural regions ==
The Kreuzberg Group was first defined as a natural region in 1968 as part of the natural regional classification of Germany at a scale of 1:200,000 (Map sheet 140 Schweinfurt) and is grouped as follows:

- (part of no. 35 East Hesse Highlands)
  - (part of no. 354 High Rhön)
    - (part of 354.0 Southern High Rhön)
      - 354.02 Kreuzberg Group

== Boundaries ==
In the north and north-west the Kreuzberg Group is separated from the Dammersfeld Ridge by the rivers Brend and Sinn. In the southwest, the range is separated from the Black Mountains by the Kellersbach. In the south it borders on the major unit of the Hammelburg South Rhön and Adelsberg Forest, which are part of the major unit known as the Odenwald, Spessart und Südrhön. To the east is the Schönau Plateau, part of the Eastern South Rhön.

== Mountains ==
- Kreuzberg (928 m, central; east of Wildflecken and south of Bischofsheim an der Rhön)
  - Arnsberg (843 m, northern spur)
  - Burgberg (714 m, northeastern spur with Osterburg Castle ruins)
  - Käulingberg (754 m, eastern spur)
