= Southern High Rhön =

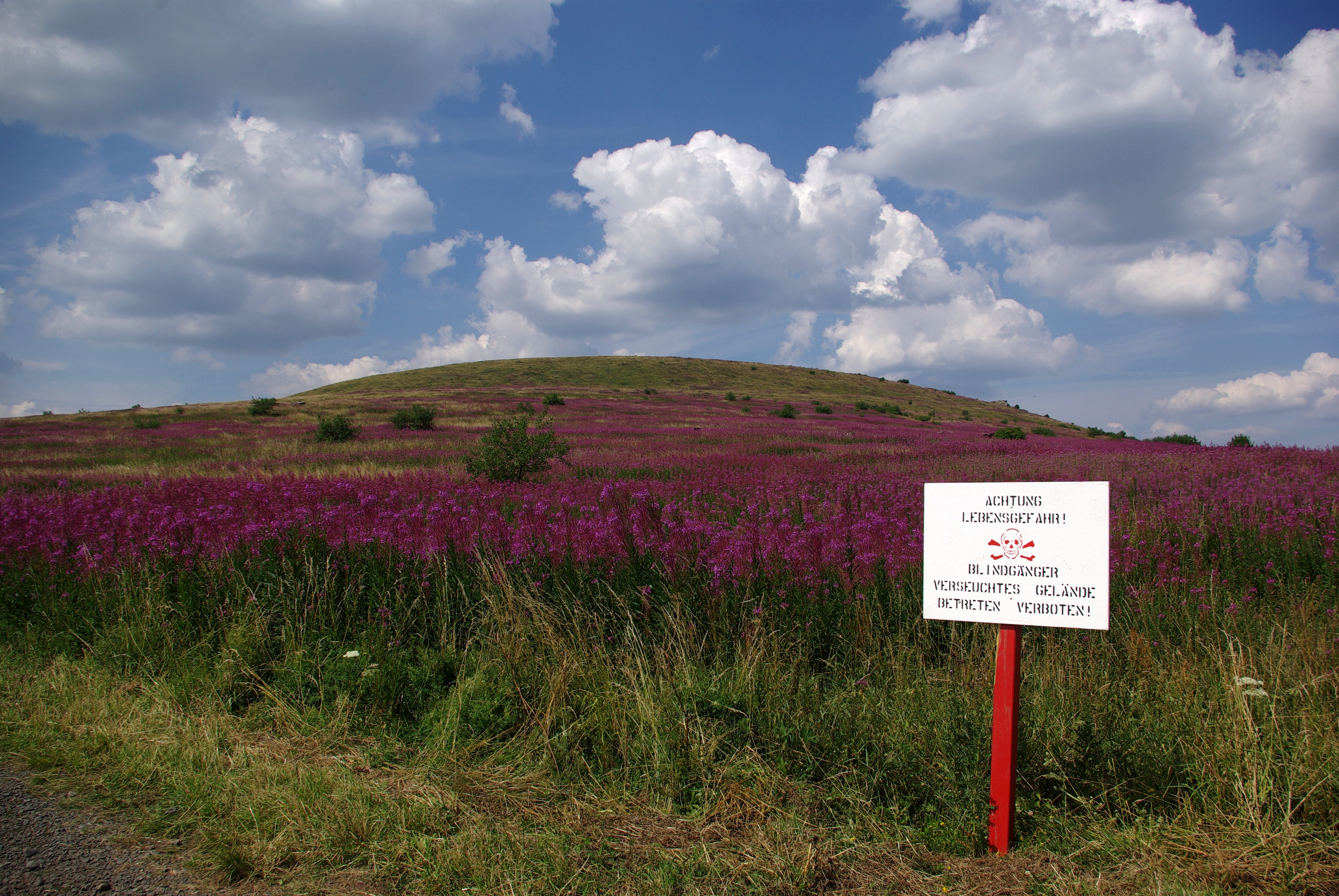
- Dammersfeldkuppe

Highest point
- Peak: Dammersfeldkuppe
- Elevation: 927.9 m above NHN

Geography
- Location within Bavaria Location within Hesse
- State(s): Counties of Bad Kissingen, and Rhön-Grabfeld, Bavaria and county of Fulda, Hesse, Germany
- Range coordinates: 50°23′49″N 9°51′44″E
- Parent range: High Rhön, Rhön

The Southern High Rhön (German: Südliche Hochrhön, also Südliche Hohe Rhön) is a natural region of the 5th level which, together with the Central Rhön, forms the region called the High Rhön. This low mountainous region has several peaks over 900 metres high, including the Dammersfeldkuppe (927.9 m), the Kreuzberg (927.8 m) and the Eierhauckberg (909.9 m)

== Natural regions ==
The Southern High Rhön was first defined in 1968 as a natural region as part of the natural regional classification of Germany at a map scale of 1:200,000 (Sheet 140 Schweinfurt) and is grouped and divided as follows:

- (part of no. 35 East Hesse Highlands)
  - (part of no. 354 High Rhön)
    - 354.0 Southern High Rhön
      - 354.00 Dammersfeld Ridge (in the north and west of the area)
      - 354.01 Black Mountains (in the south of the area)
      - 354.02 Kreuzberg Group (in the east of the area)
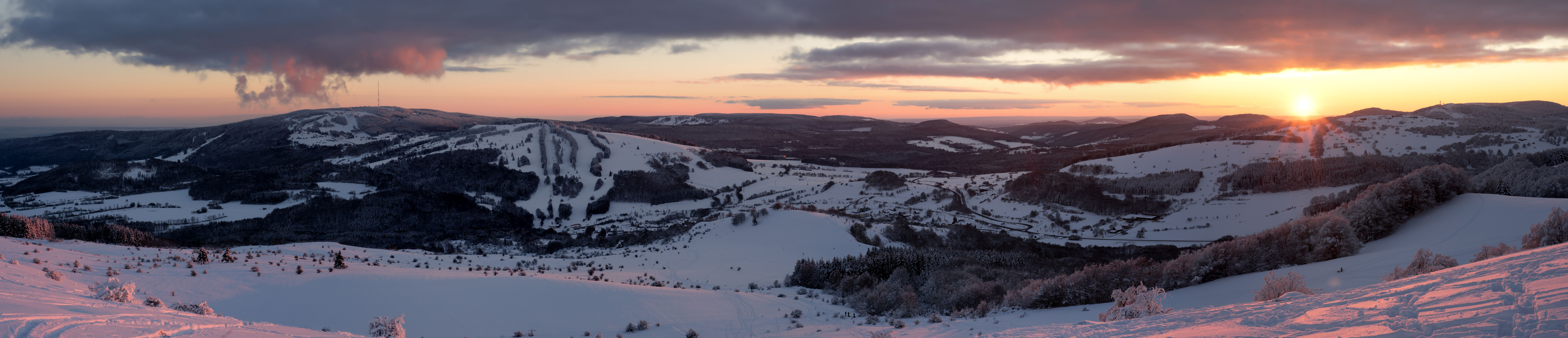
View over the Southern High Rhön from the Himmeldunkberg

== Boundaries ==
In the east the area borders on the Eastern South Rhön, in the southeast on the Hammelburg South Rhön, both parts of the South Rhön and the major region (3rd level) of the Odenwald, Spessart and South Rhön within the South German Scarplands (2nd level).

In the west there are areas of the Western and Eastern Kuppenrhön, which is part of the Anterior and Kuppenrhön. In the north is the Central Rhön, also part of the High Rhön. Together with the Anterior and Kuppenrhön, the High Rhön is part of the East Hesse Highlands.

== Natural region ==
From Heidelstein two mountain ridges radiate south and southwest, separated by the Sinn. The southwesternmost is the Dammersfeld Ridge, which forms a contiguous and predominantly basaltic unit. The ridge radiating southwards is divided into the more northerly Kreuzberg Group and the more southerly Black Mountains.
