= Wachtküppel =

Mountain in Hesse, Germany

Coordinates: 50°28′13″N 9°53′33″E

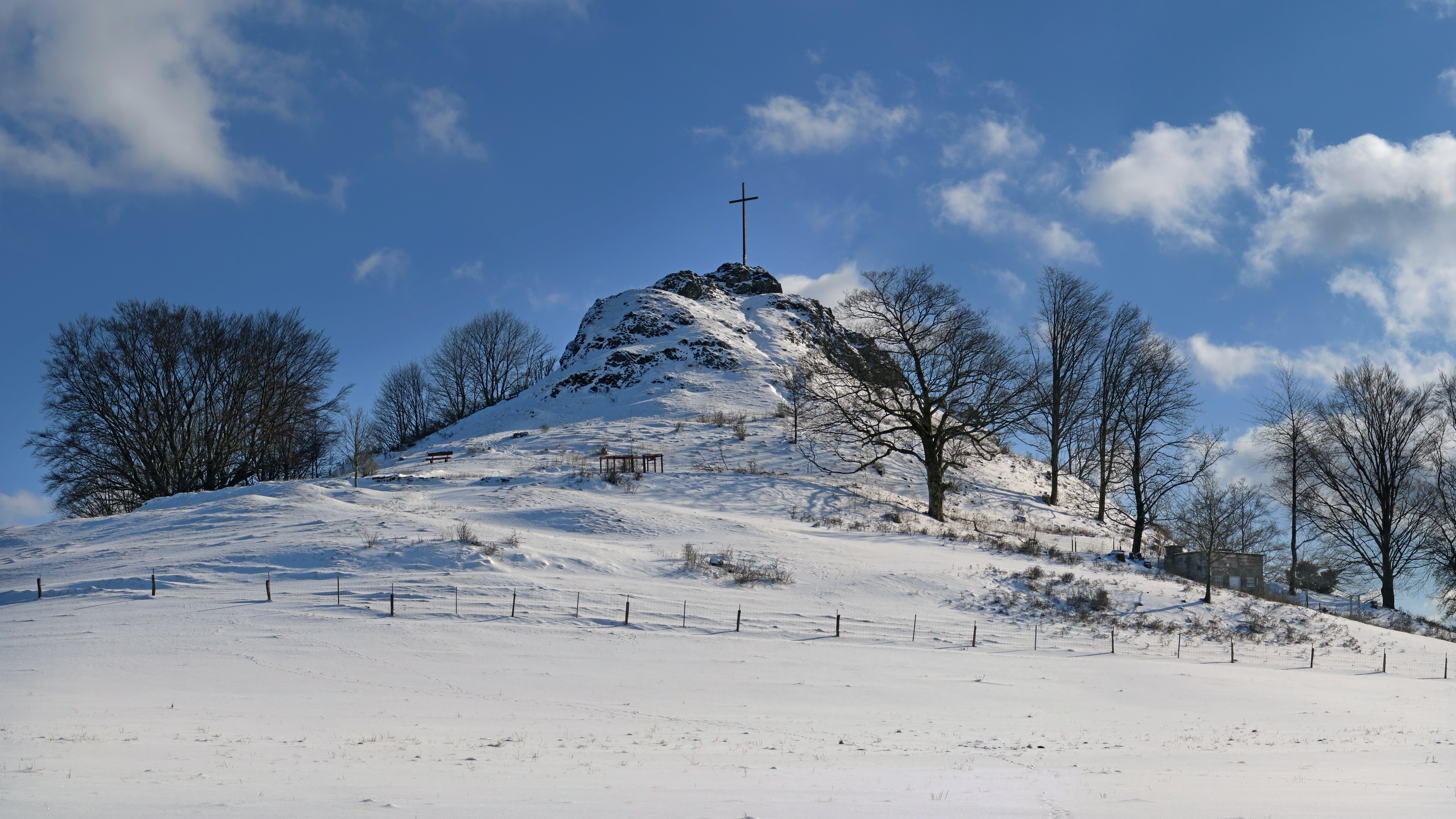
- The Wachtküppel

Highest point
- Elevation: 705 m (2,313 ft)

Geography
- Location: Hesse, Germany
- Parent range: Rhön Mountains

Wachtküppel is a mountain of Hesse, Germany in the vicinity of the Wasserkuppe in the Rhön Mountains.
