= Mathesberg =

Mountain in Hesse, Germany

Coordinates: 50°29′15″N 9°58′43″E

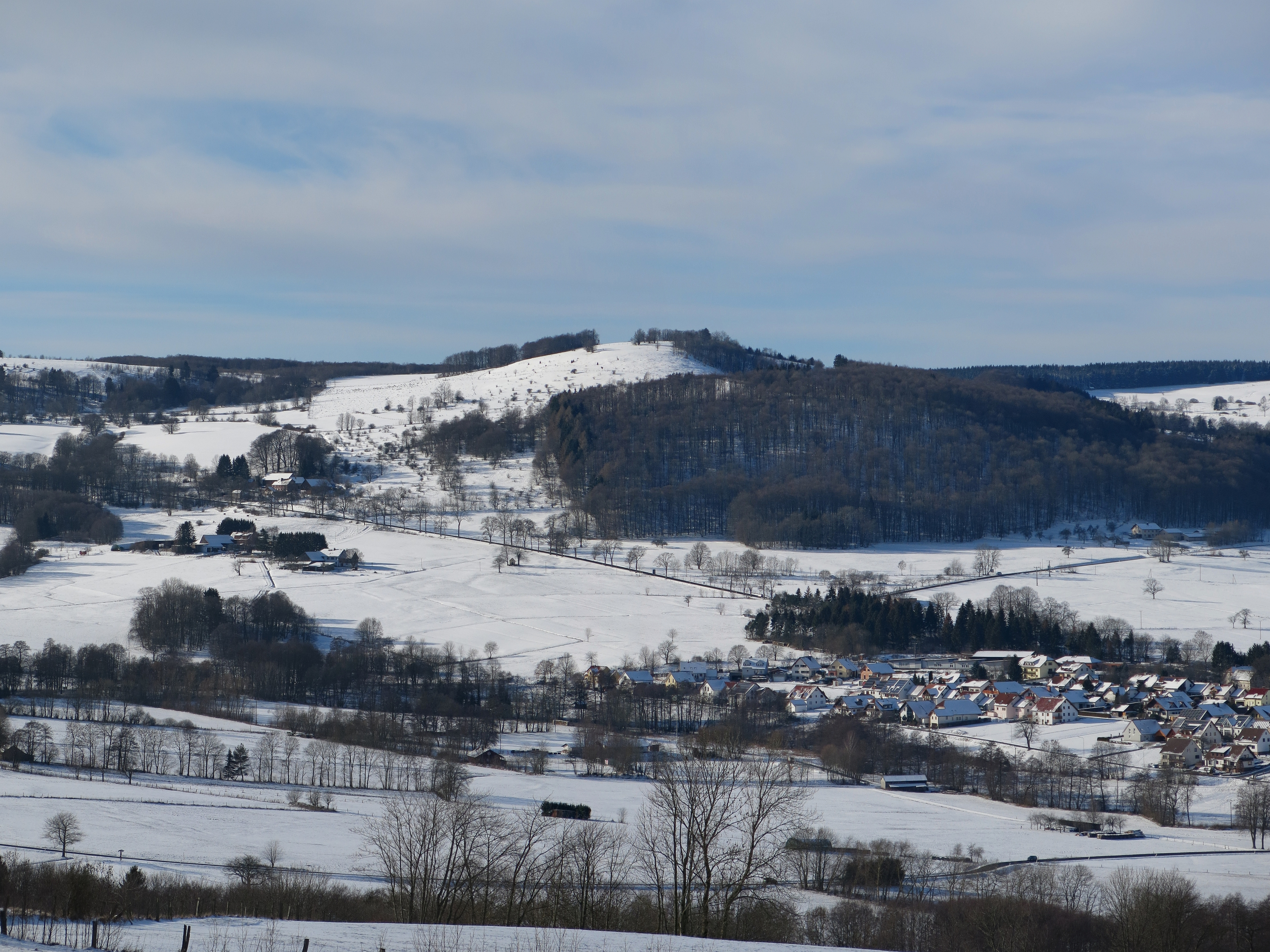
- Mathesberg, seen from northeast

Highest point
- Elevation: 831.8 m (2,729 ft)

Geography
- Location: Hesse, Germany
- Parent range: Rhön Mountains

Mathesberg is a mountain of Hesse, located in the Rhön Mountains, Germany.
