= Nazi dissolution of the Bruderhof =

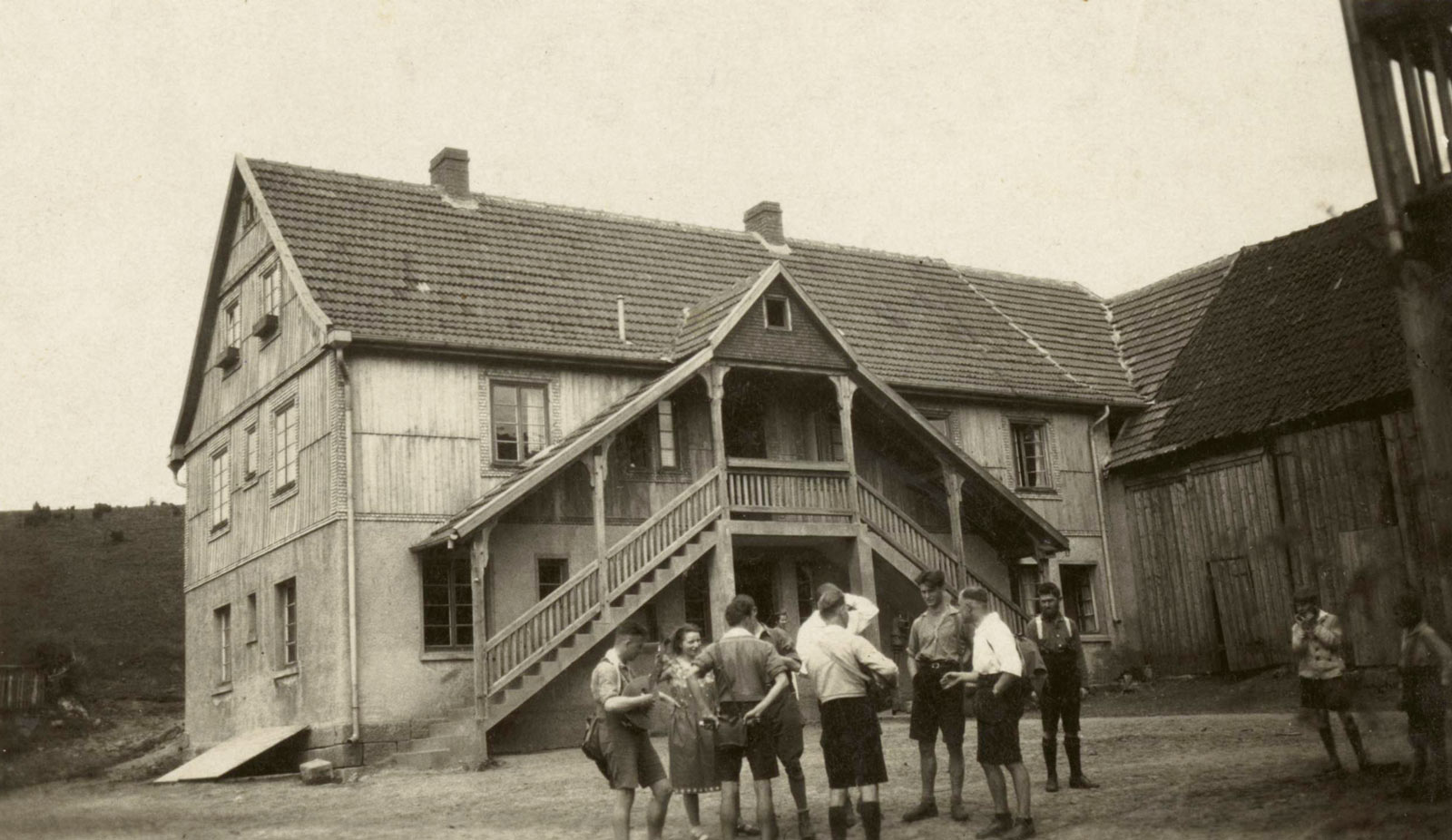
A building on the Rhön Bruderhof

The Rhön Bruderhof was the second of the Bruderhof Communities, with around a hundred people, situated in the Rhön mountains in Germany, not far from Fulda. Begun by Emmy and Eberhard Arnold and a handful of others in 1920, its members sought a lifestyle that would offer an alternative to the bitterness and despair that ravaged Europe in the wake of World War I. They took the words of Jesus in the Sermon on the Mount as a directive on which to build their community: peacemaking, purity in relationships, love to one another and to enemies.

Arnold wrote articles, published a periodical, and was a popular speaker in tune with the currents of the time. When Adolf Hitler seized control of Germany at the beginning of 1933, Arnold was immediately concerned, recognising that his own Christian philosophy was on a collision course with Hitler’s worldview. Rather than flee the country, however, Arnold believed that the Bruderhof had a missionary task. He wrote personal letters to Hitler, Hindenburg, and other high-ranking officials, in which he appealed to them to protect innocent lives. He warned his community to prepare for persecution.

At the end of 1933, the community’s license to run a private elementary school was revoked. Unwilling to submit their children to Nazi influence, they took them to the independent principality of Liechtenstein, where they established a daughter community. A year later, when compulsive military conscription was introduced in Germany, the Bruderhof’s young men similarly escaped to Liechtenstein. In 1936 a third community was begun in the UK, the Cotswold Bruderhof.

Eberhard Arnold died unexpectedly at the end of 1935 as a result of complications of a broken leg. The Rhön Bruderhof struggled to remain viable: Establishing new Bruderhofs in Liechtenstein and the United Kingdom demanded money that they did not have, while in Germany the manpower needed to maintain the agricultural projects was lacking. In addition, they were no longer permitted to sell their produce in Germany. Twice they were searched and interrogated by the Gestapo.

On April 14, 1937, the German compound was surrounded by stormtroopers, Gestapo and local police. Bruderhof members were herded into the dining hall, where the Gestapo read out a decree dissolving the incorporated society and ordering its members to return to their former homes. The property, including the cash and the members’ passports, was confiscated. Rooms were searched, and books and papers were hauled off. The three men who made up the Executive Committee were arrested.

Two visitors from the Hutterian Brethren in America happened to be present, and when the police entered their room they protested and boldly announced that they would report this event on their return home. The Gestapo had not expected this, and it is likely that their presence saved the lives of Bruderhof members, who were allowed to leave the country safely. Some travelled to Liechtenstein, and others to the UK (via the Netherlands, where they received help from the Mennonite community). One woman, the accountant, remained behind under house arrest to close the books.

The Executive Committee, Hans Meier, Hans Boller, and Karl Keiderling, were held in prison for three months. During that time, the initial charge of a threat to the state was changed to fraud – a move that cleared the Nazis of any accusation of persecuting Christians.

The Bruderhof still exists in North and South America, the UK, Austria, Australia, and once again in Germany. They still believe in pacifism, community of goods and communal work.
