= Buchonia =

Region in Hesse, Germany

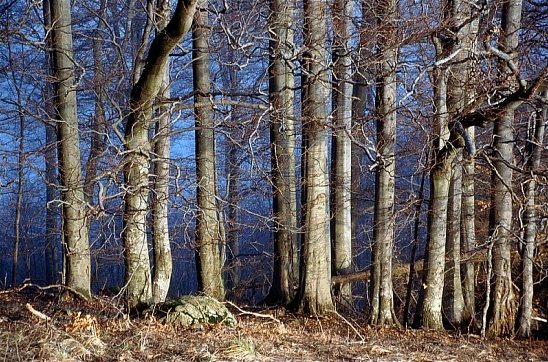
Beech wood in the Rhön

Buchonia is a region in Hesse, a state of Germany, where one of the first forestry planning systems was developed by Georg Ludwig Hartig (1764–1837). It was called "Flächenfachwerk". He also wrote in 1791 "Anweisung zur Holzzucht für Förster"

== Books ==
Georg Ludwig Hartig: "Anweisung zur Holzzucht für Förster"
