= Rother Kuppe =

German mountain

Coordinates: 50°29′N 10°06′E

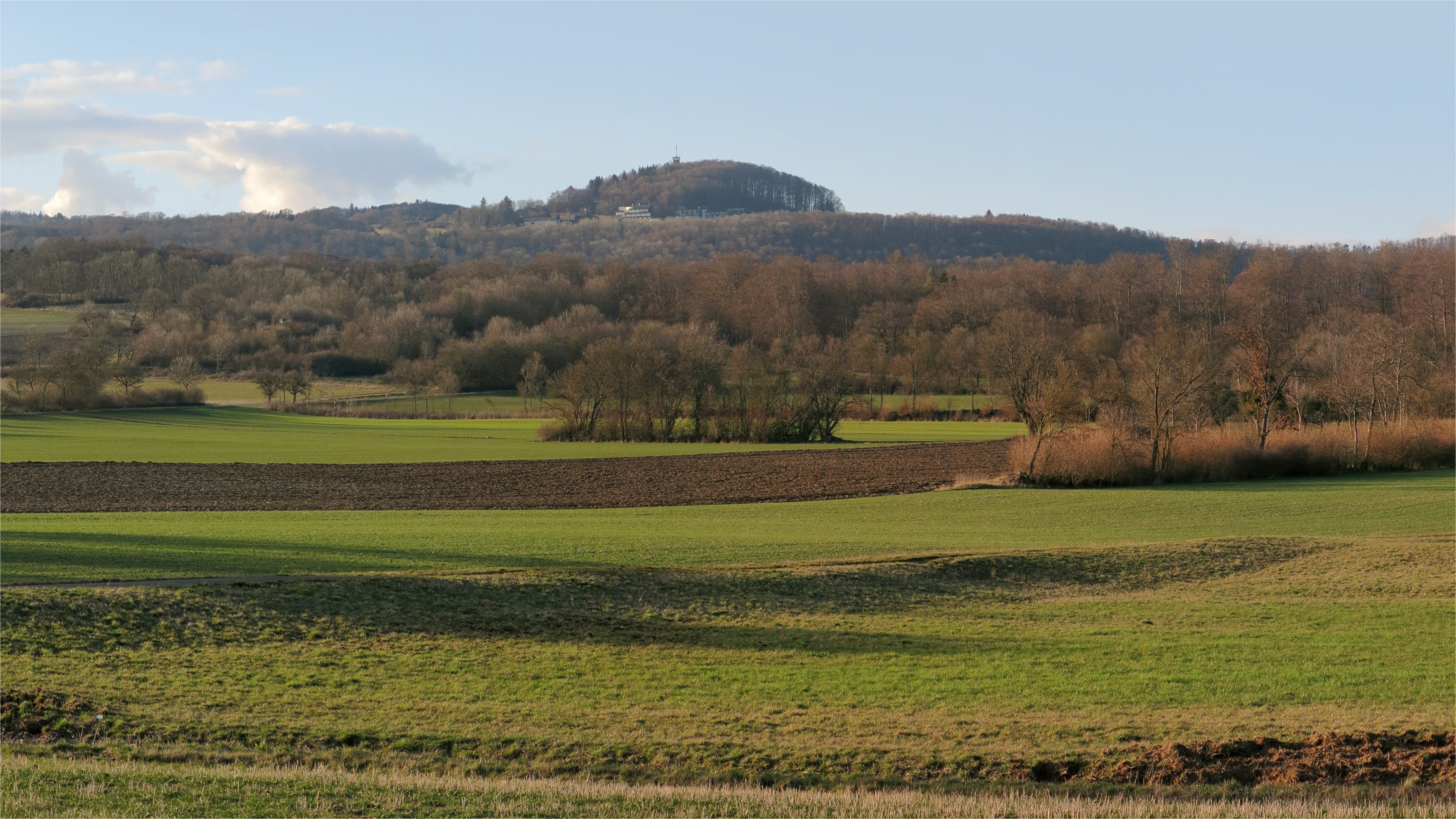
- The Rother Kuppe in the Rhön Mountains seen from southeast

Highest point
- Elevation: 711 m (2,333 ft)

Geography
- Location: Bavaria, Germany
- Parent range: Rhön Mountains

Rother Kuppe is a mountain in Bavaria, Germany. It is one of the more prominent peaks of the Long Rhön, part of the Rhön Mountains.

== Geography ==
The mountain is about 1.35 km southwest of the town of Roth, a locality in Hausen, Rhön-Grabfeld.

== Geology ==
It consists primarily of a nepheline basalt plate.

== Description ==
It is 711 meters above sea level at its peak. The northeast flank is covered by forest. Southwest of the summit is a large meadow with old beech trees, one of which is 7.8 meters in circumference. The tree, however, was damaged by Cyclone Kyrill.

An observation tower was built on top of Rother Kuppe in 1955 and was later expanded into an inn.
