= Central Rhön =

Mountains in Germany

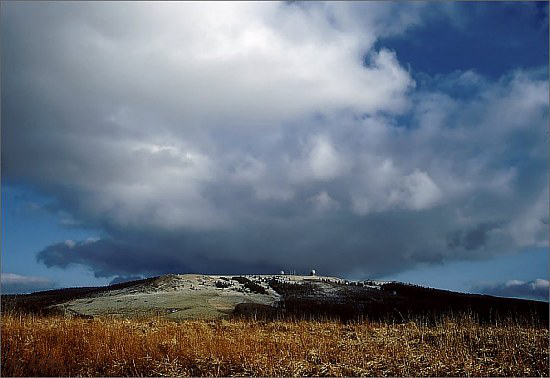
- View of the Wasserkuppe

Highest point
- Peak: Wasserkuppe
- Elevation: 950 m above NHN

Geography
- Location within Bavaria Location within Hesse
- State(s): County of Fulda, Hesse, county of Rhön-Grabfeld, Bavaria (Germany)
- Range coordinates: 50°29′53″N 9°56′16″E
- Parent range: High Rhön, Rhön

The Central Rhön (German: Zentrale Rhön) is a 5th level natural region which, together with the Southern High Rhön, forms the High Rhön. The region has several mountains over 900 metres high, including: the Wasserkuppe (950.0 m) and Heidelstein (926 m). Other summits over 900 metres are regarded as subpeaks due to their low isolation and prominence.

== Boundaries ==
To the north and west are the Western and Eastern Kuppen Rhön, to the northeast is the Eastern Rhön Foreland.

In the southeast is the Eastern South Rhön, which as part of the South Rhön and the tertiary level major region of Odenwald, Spessart und Südrhön, is part of the South German Scarplands (a 2nd order natural region).

To the southwest is the Southern High Rhön. This is also subordinated to the High Rhön. Together with the Anterior and Kuppen Rhön, the High Rhön is part of the East Hesse Highlands.

== Natura region ==
The Central Rhön is described as the "central bulge of the High Rhön, a highland region divided into ridges, high plateaus and, in the west, into individual domed summits, sometimes with wooded slopes and grassland on the heights." The Ulster valley divides it into two ridges, the Wasserkuppen Rhön and Long Rhön.
