= Große Haube =

Mountain in Bavaria, Germany

Coordinates: 50°23′N 9°45′E

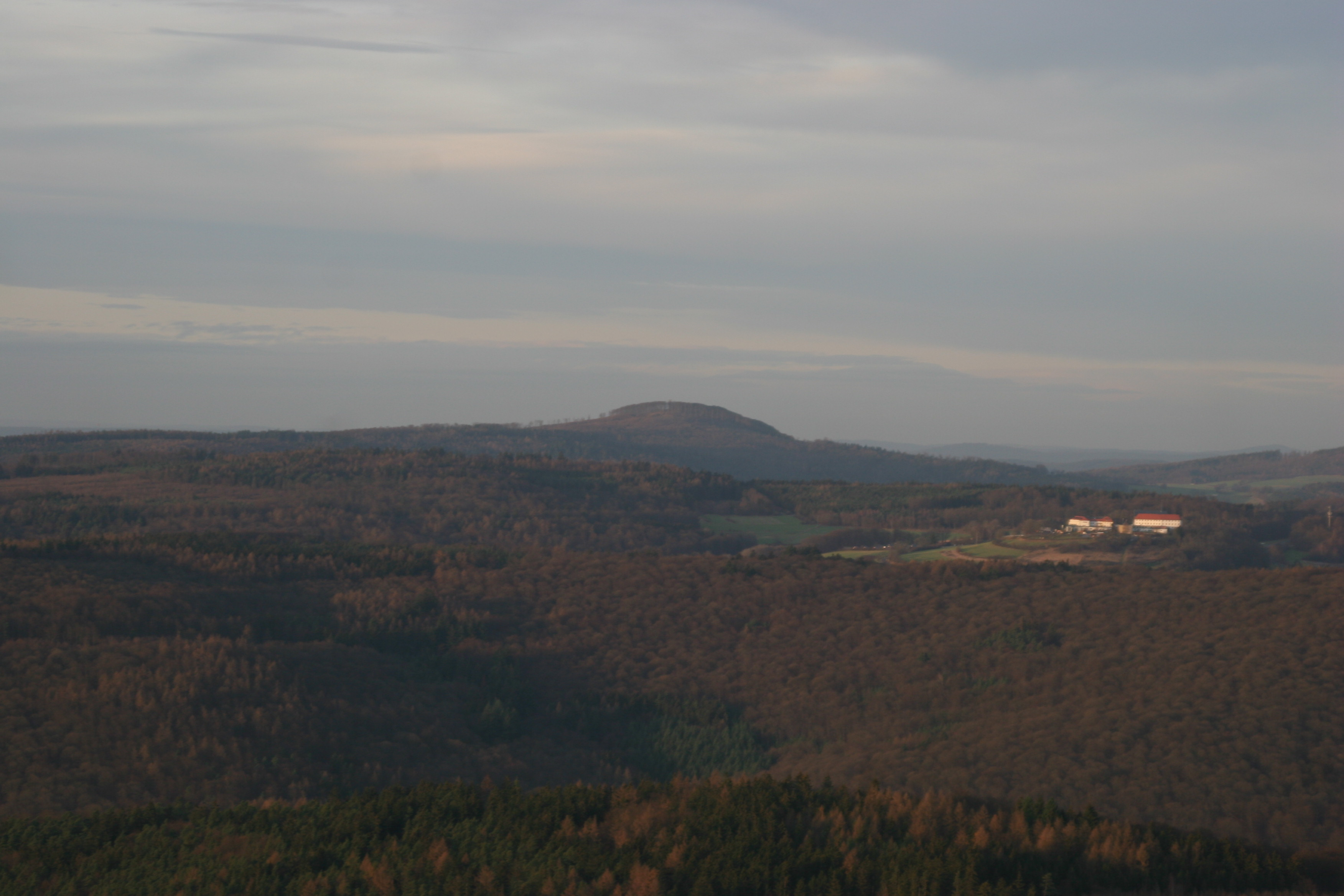
- View of the Große Haube as seen from afar

Highest point
- Elevation: 658 m (2,159 ft)
- Isolation: 3.9 km (2.4 mi)

Geography
- Location: Bavaria, Germany

Große Haube is a mountain of Bavaria, Germany. It is 658 metres above sea level. The mountain is part of a large, low mountain range located in Bavaria. The name "Große Haube" is German for "large hood".
