= Milseburg =

Mountain in Hesse, Germany

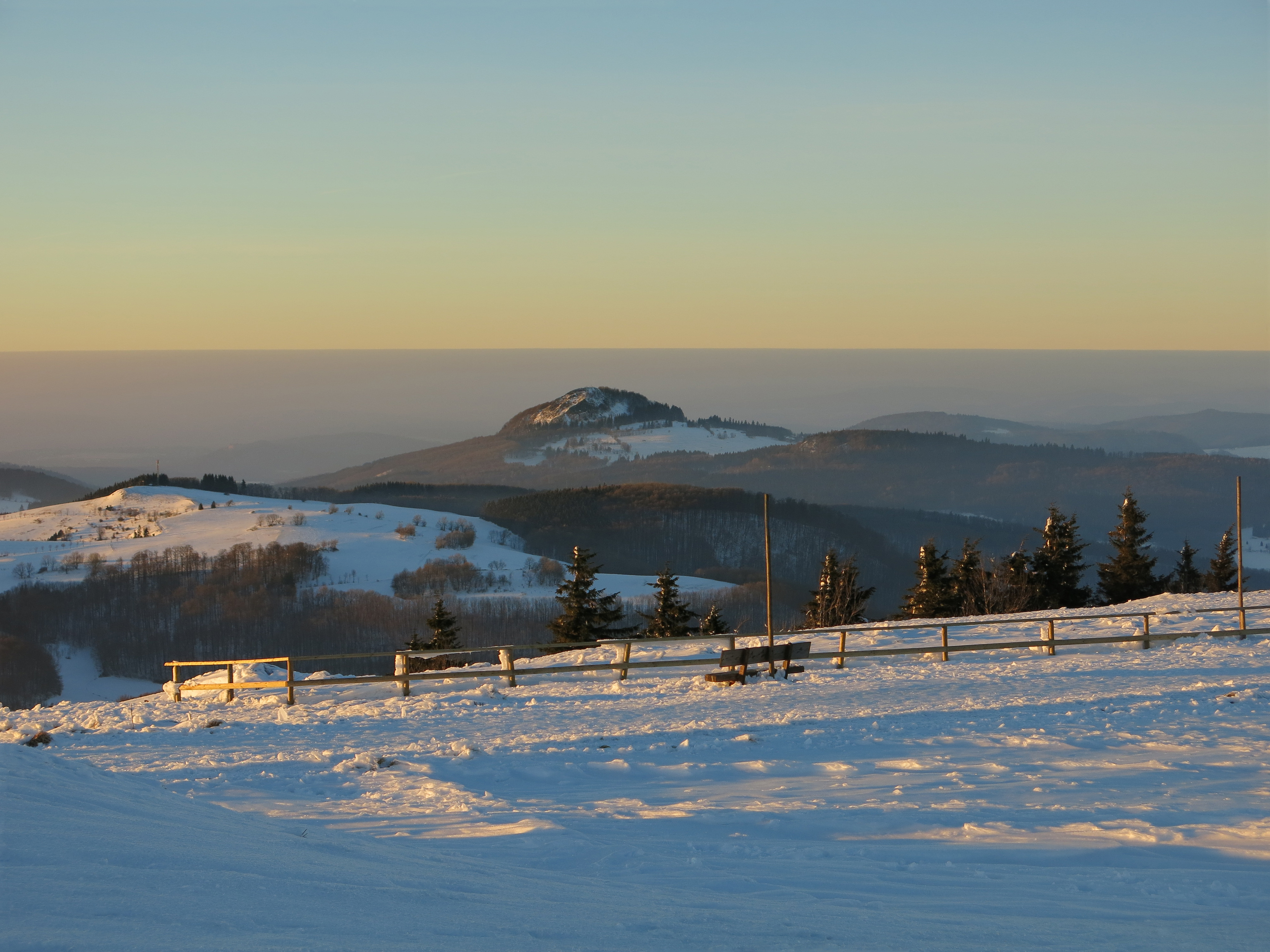
- Milseburg, seen from Wasserkuppe

Highest point
- Elevation: 835 m (2,740 ft)
- Prominence: 175 m (574 ft)
- Isolation: 5.19 km (3.22 mi)
- Coordinates: 50°32′42″N 9°53′53″E

Geography
- Location within Hesse
- Location: Hesse, Germany
- Parent range: Rhön Mountains

The Milseburg is an extinct volcano and at 835 metres (2,740 ft) above sea level the second highest elevation in the Hessian part of the Rhön Mountains, Germany. The hill is located east of Fulda, near the villages of Kleinsassen and Danzwiesen. It is a popular destination for hikers and bikers. Scientifically, Milseburg is most notable for the remains of a large Celtic oppidum. It also features several other structures on the peak, including a chapel dedicated to St Gangulphus.

== Geography ==
The Milseburg is located in the municipality of Hofbieber, east of Fulda in the Rhön hills of Hesse, Germany. It is made up of volcanic basalt. The headwaters of the creek Bieber, a contributor to the Haune are located immediately to the south of the Milseburg. It flows around Milseburg to the west.

Milseburg is the highest elevation in the Western Küppenrhön and the second highest in the Hessian part of the hill range. It rises around 130 metres (427 ft) over the surrounding landscape. It has quite steep slopes on all sides except to the northwest, which offers the only easy access to the top.

A nature reserve of around 26 hectares (created in the 1970s) covers most of the hill.

== Oppidum ==
The Milseburg is most notable, aside from being a landmark, for having been the site of an important Celtic oppidum. It was likely occupied from around 1200 to 800 BC and again from 450 BC to around the turn of the eras. The Ringwall (circular rampart) was one of the largest and most elevated in eastern Hesse. It originally had three gates, only one of which — the Tor am Kälberhutstein — was passable by wagons.

The main fortification was a 1,300 metres (4,265 ft) long stone wall that surrounded the north, east and south sides of the hill at its base. It was discovered as ancient in origin by R. Virchow (1821–1902). However, for a long time it was locally thought to be a modern field border. As a result, when the nearby railway line was built in 1896 most of the wall to the north and northeast was removed and used to make gravel. The wall begins at the scree slope of the Kälberhutstein to the north, slopes in an arch to the southeast and encompasses the whole eastern side of the hill at a distance of 50 metres (164 ft) to 75 metres (246 ft) from its base. The three gates were located to the northeast, east and south. Ch. L. Thomas identified the wall as a pfostenschlitzmauer in 1906.

An inner wall surrounded the 450 metres (1,476 ft) long by 275 metres (902 ft) wide plateau. Natural formations (the Kälberhutstein to the north, cliffs up to 60 metres (197 ft) high to the west, scree slopes to the south and the rock formation known as Kleine Milseburg to the east) limited the need for artificial fortifications to a few stretches. Several springs are located on the plateau and would have supplied drinking water for the residents.

Research on the Milseburg included excavations by J. Vondreau (1863–1951) and the Landesmuseum Kassel (J. Bohleau, G. Eisentraut, W. Lange) in the years between 1900 and 1906. Many traces of settlements were found on the hill top, especially near the springs. One of them, near the Kleine Milseburg consisted of around 30 circular living "pods" of roughly 3.5 metres (11 ft) to 5 metres (16 ft) diameter, delimited by stones and protected by additional walls. This "village" yielded various findings from the La Tène period, but no information on the possible type of house erected on the circular plans was discovered. Although only very limited in scale, the excavations yielded several hundred pounds worth of pottery shards. These indicate intensive use as a settlement during the late Hallstatt to the late La Tène periods (6th/5th century to 1st century BC). The oppidum likely served as a nexus for the region where Celtic and Germanic cultures met. It was the largest circular rampart in the Rhön region. Other findings show that the hill was inhabited or at least visited during earlier periods: a bronze spearhead from the Urnfield culture (1200 – 800 BC) and a shard from the Corded Ware culture (roughly 2500 – 1800 BC).

== Later history and name ==
One of several different versions of a Christian legend claims that the giant "Mils" who had allied himself to the devil used to live here. Saint Gangulphus vanquished the giant, who died. The devil then built a cairn for him with stones that outlined the giant's shape, feet to the north, head to the south. That supposedly created the trapezoid hill of Milseburg.

The origin of the name Mils is not known for certain. In a document by Emperor Otto II from 980, the hill is already called Milsiburg. There was a small medieval castle on the western slope beneath the peak. Although it is only mentioned in a written document in 1119, it could have been built significantly earlier and given rise to the hill's name.

== Today ==
The hill was the property of Johann von und zu Guttenberg until 2005. That year, he sold it to the town of Hofbieber for €200,000. The State of Hesse contributed €52,000, the Fulda district another €10,000 to the purchase. The balance was made up by local businesses and individual donors. The Rhönklub has maintained a mountain cabin on the peak for over 100 years. Nearby is the Gangolfskapelle a chapel dedicated to Saint Gangulphus. It is close to the location where the holy site of the Celts was likely situated. Since that area has not yet been excavated, no evidence of its existence has yet been found. Some small remains of the medieval castle are also still visible. At the highest point, there is a group of statues, showing a Crucifixion scene.

The Milseburg also features Germany's longest cycling tunnel, a former part of the Rhönbahn railway.

Milseburg is a popular destination for bikers and hikers.

Panoramic view from the summit

== See also ==
- List of volcanoes in Germany
