= Döllbach =

River in Germany

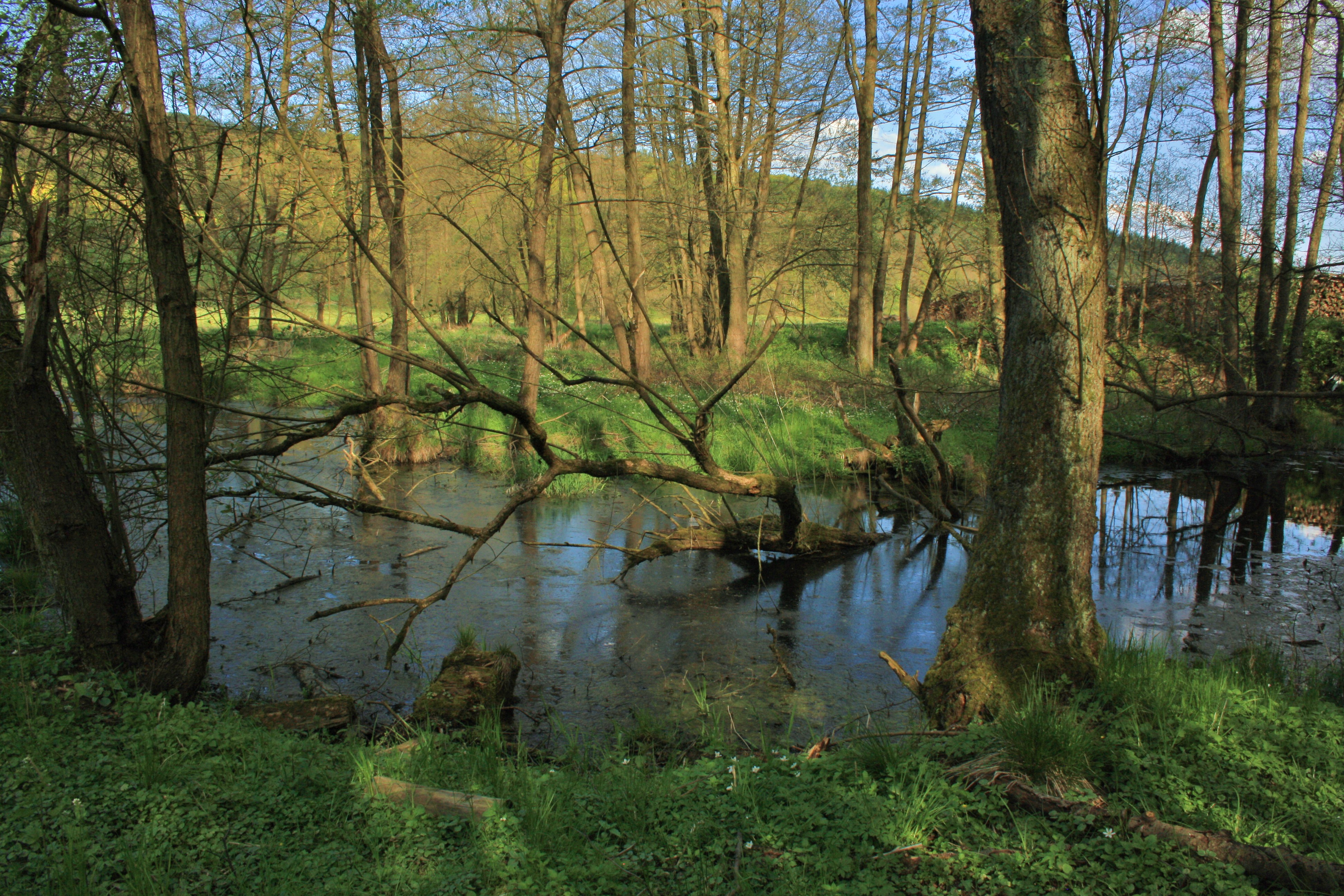

Location
- Country: Germany
- States: Bavaria and Hesse

Physical characteristics
- Mouth
  - location: Fliede
  - coordinates: 50.4881°N 9.6687°E
- Length: 24.6 km (15.3 mi)

Basin features
- Progression: Fliede→ Fulda→ Weser→ North Sea

The Döllbach (in its upper course: Döllau) is a river of Bavaria and Hesse, Germany. It flows into the right bank of the Fliede near Eichenzell.

== See also ==
- List of rivers of Hesse
