= Felda (Werra) =

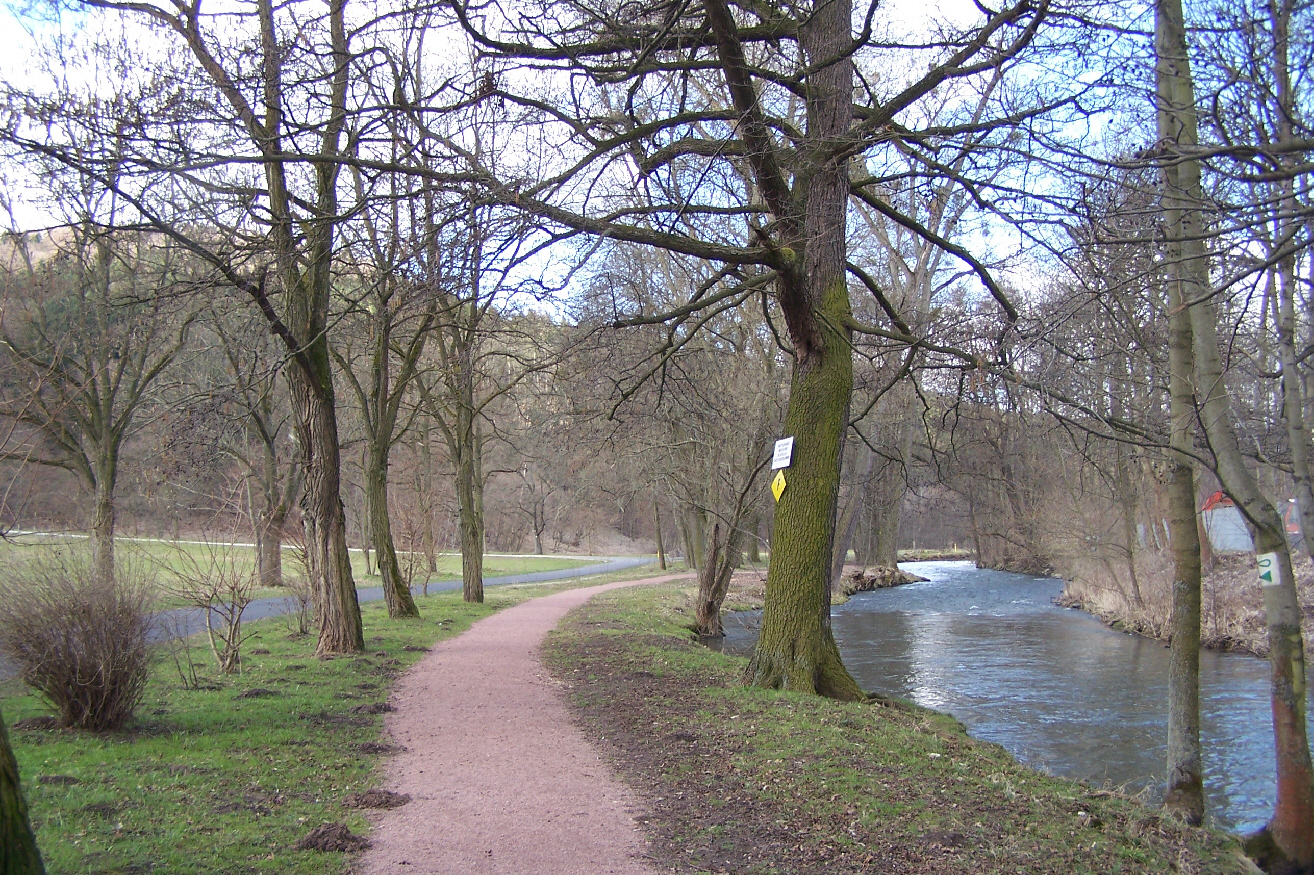
- At the Felda in Stadtlengsfeld

Location
- Country: Germany
- State: Thuringia

Physical characteristics
- Source
  - location: Germany
- Mouth
  - location: Werra
  - coordinates: 50.8422°N 10.0826°E

Basin features
- Progression: Werra→ Weser→ North Sea

Felda (German pronunciation: [ˈfɛlda]) is a river of Thuringia, Germany. It flows into the Werra in Dorndorf. The main source of the Felda is located immediately south of Erbenhausen am Bergsattel between the Stellberg (662.3 m) in the south and the Alten Mark (675.7 m) in the north at an altitude of about 510 m; The Herpf rises in the eastern neighborhood. A left source stream, called Rodgraben, rises at about 676 m altitude on the eastern slope of the Ellenbogen (813 m) and passes the place Reichenhausen immediately above the confluence.

After a route along the federal road 285 through Kaltensundheim, Kaltennordheim, Fischbach / Rhön, Diedorf, Neidhartshausen, and Dermbach to Hartschimmern and further along the state road 1022 via Weilar, Stadtlengsfeld, Menzengraben and Dietlas, the Felda flows into the Dorndorf at an altitude of 225.1 m there from the east coming Weser source river Werra.

The route of the former Feldabahn follows its eponymous river between Kaltennordheim and Dorndorf and crosses it several times.

== See also ==
- List of rivers of Thuringia
