= Eierhauckberg =

Mountain in Hesse, Germany

Coordinates: 50°24′21″N 9°54′03″E

Highest point
- Elevation: 909.9 m (2,985 ft)
- Prominence: 125 m (410 ft)

Geography
- Location: Hesse, Germany

Eierhauckberg is a mountain of Hesse, Germany.
