= Premich =

River in Germany

Location
- Country: Germany
- State: Bavaria
- District: Unterfranken
- Water code: GKZ: 24452

Physical characteristics
- Source
  - location: confluence of Kellersbach and Kleiner Steinach
  - coordinates: 50°18′11″N 10°01′42″E
  - elevation: 236 m (774 ft)
- Mouth
  - location: Franconian Saale
  - coordinates: 50°17′3″N 10°06′12″E
  - elevation: 215 m (705 ft)
- Length: 7.2 km (4.5 mi)

Basin features
- Progression: Franconian Saale→ Main→ Rhine→ North Sea

The Premich is a river of Bavaria, Germany. It arises from the confluence of the Kellersbach and the Kleiner Steinach near the village of Premich, part of Burkardroth. It flows into the Franconian Saale in Steinach an der Saale, part of Bad Bocklet. Its length is 7.2 km (4.5 mi), 18.4 km (11.4 mi) including its longest source river, the Kellersbach.

== Inflows ==
- Schmalwasserbach (left)

== See also ==
- List of rivers of Bavaria
