= Rhön Cycleway =

Cycle path in Germany

Coordinates: 50.8146392°N 10.230983°E

Rhön Cycleway (Rhönradweg)
- Length: 180 km
- Location: Thuringia, Hesse, Bavaria
- Designation: Description at ADFC; ADFC classifications
- Trailheads: Bad Salzungen, Hammelburg
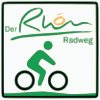
- Waymark

Trail map
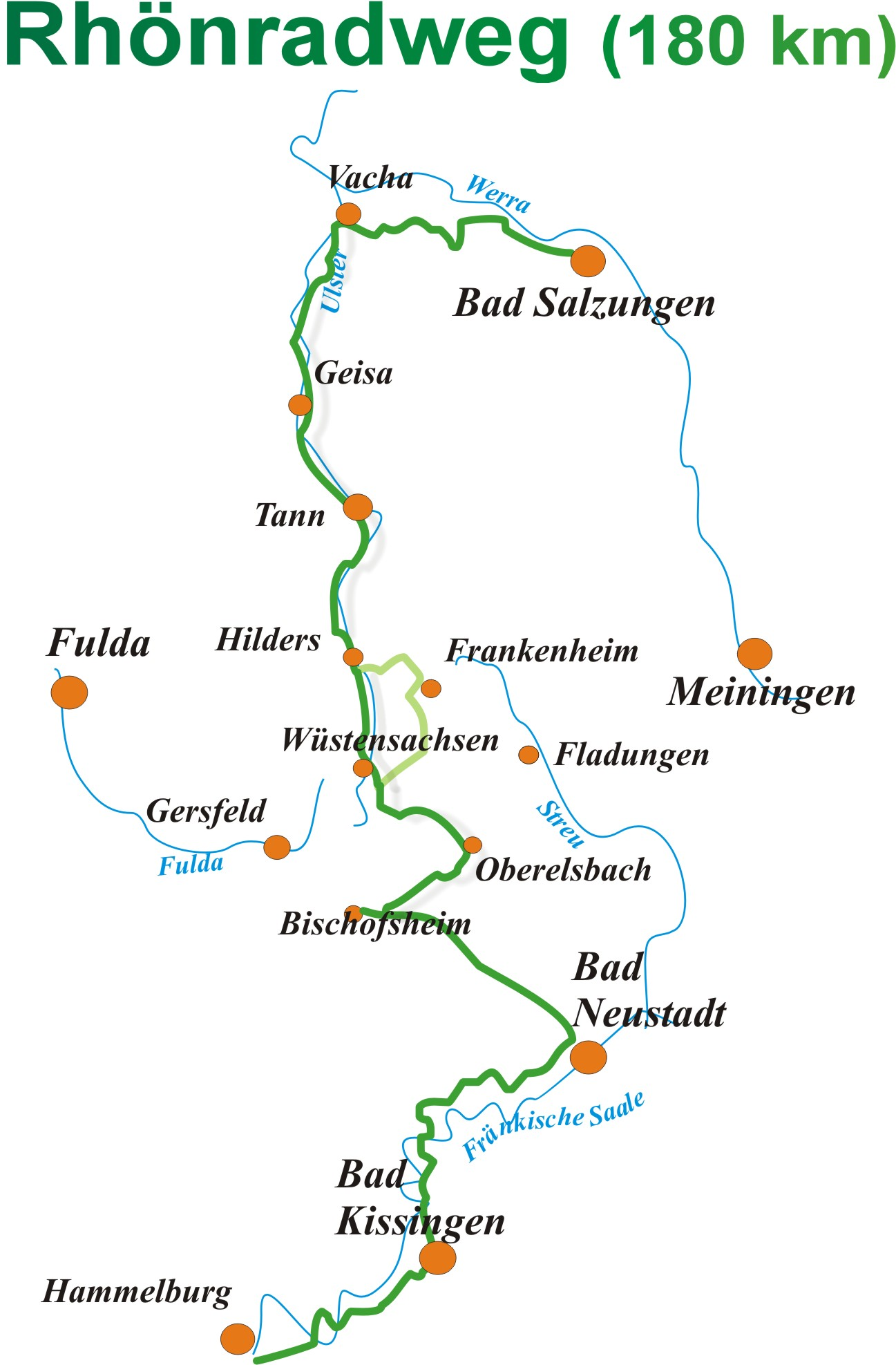

The Rhön Cycleway (Rhönradweg or Rhön-Radweg) is a cycle path in Germany that runs for 180 kilometres from Bad Salzungen to Hammelburg. Its route takes it through 3 states: from Thuringia via Hesse to Bavaria.

== Route ==
=== Bad Salzungen < 0 km – 180 km > ===
The Rhön Cycleway begins on the station forecourt next to the tourist information office on Gradierwerk street. From there it crosses to the other side of the Werra river and initially coincides with the Werra Valley Cycleway running downstream. It passes through Tiefenort to reach the picturesque timber-framed village of Kieselbach. In Merkers it crosses to the other side of the river and reaches Dorndorf, where potash salt used to be mined and where the River Werra is joined by the little Rhön stream, the Felda, whose source is in the High Rhön. The cycle path later crosses the Werra and follows its winding course to the historic bridge at Vacha.

=== Vacha < 22 km – 158 km > ===
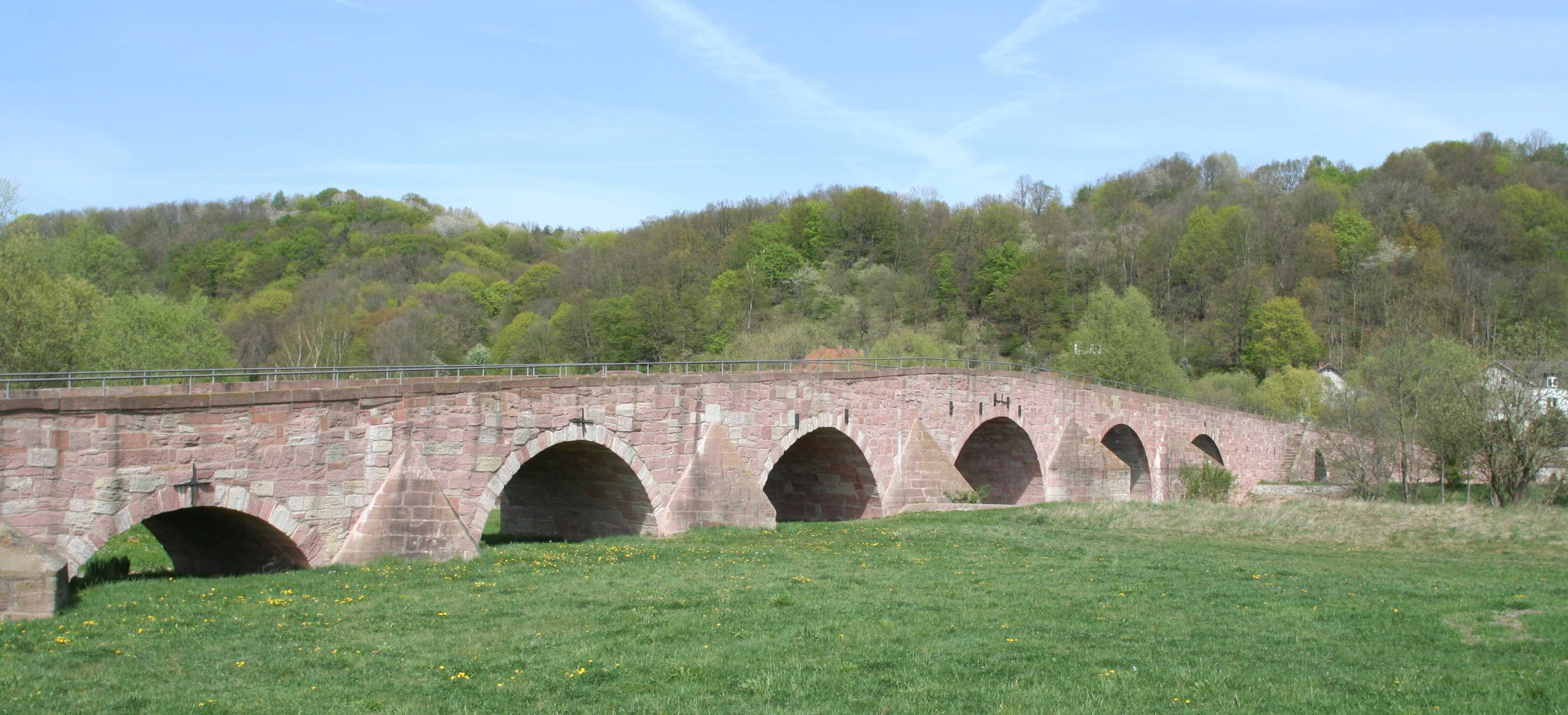
Bridge of Unity at Vacha

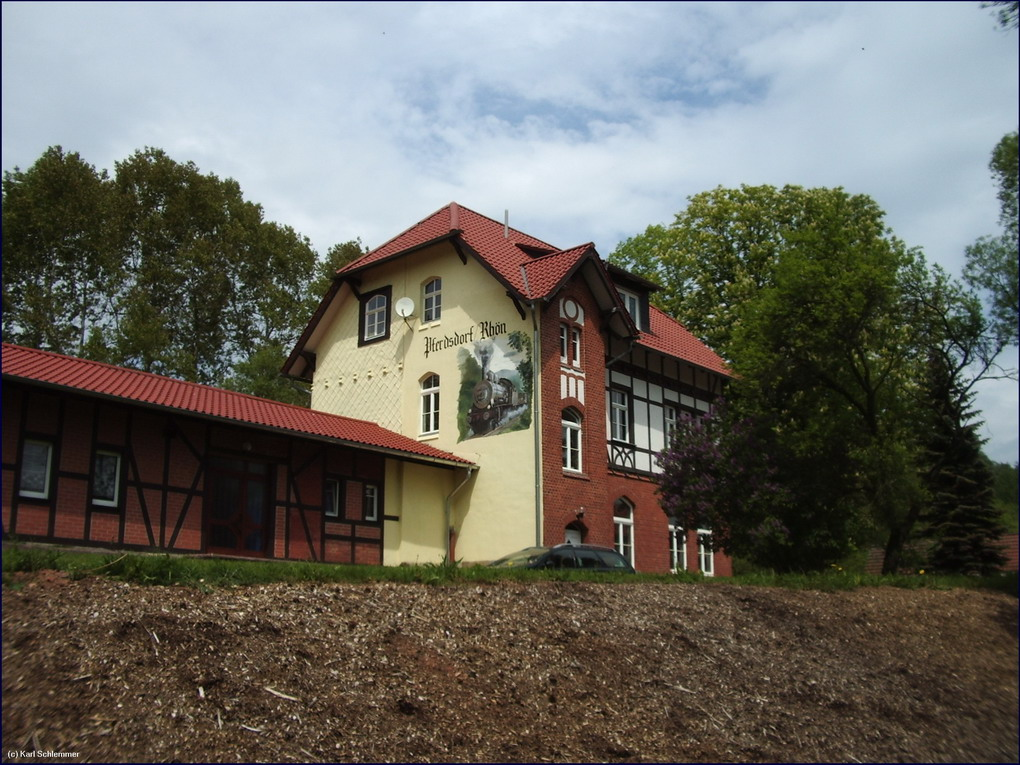
Old station of Pferdsdorf/Rhön on the cycleway in Thuringia

A spur over the historic Werra Bridge leads to Vacha, the oldest town in West Thuringia. It owes its existence to its location on the ancient trade route between the Rhineland and the central German region, the Frankfurt-Leipzig Trade Route (Frankfurt-Leipziger Handelsstraße), which was also called the Imperial Road (Die Reiches Straße or Via Regia). Here the route has to cross the Werra. There are many attractive timber-framed buildings– the oldest dating to the 15th century – which characterise the appearance of the town of Vacha. Back on the right bank of the Werra, the path continues to Philippsthal.

=== Philippsthal < 24 km – 156 km > ===
In Philippsthal the route leaves the Werra valley and, for the next 50 kilometres, follows the Ulster valley of the High Rhön. Along the Ulster it crosses the Thuringia-Hessian state border several times. This region was out of bounds to tourists until 1989. Tip: In Wenigentaft, cyclists can follow Waldhessen Route 14 to access (after 2 km) the 25-kilometre-long cycling route known as the Hessian Skittles (Hessisches Kegelspiel).

=== Geisa < 43 km – 137 km > ===
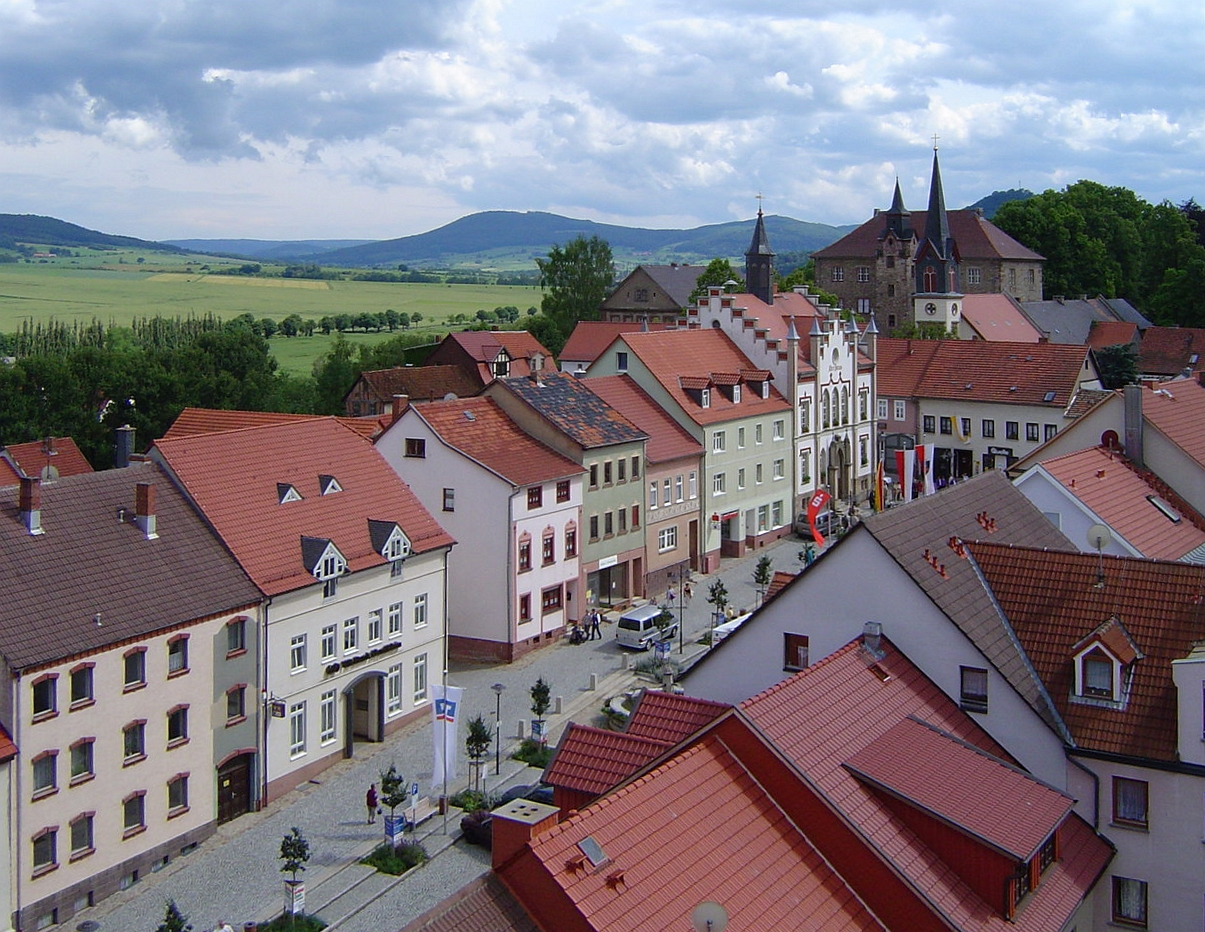
Historic market place in Geisa

A well upgraded section of cycleway leads to the town of Geisa at the foot of the Gangolfiberg. Geisa came into the possession of Fulda Abbey in 817 and, in 1265, was protected by a town wall, parts of which have survived. The market place forms the picturesque centre of the place. Tip: from Buttlar you can reach a closed railway line that is now a cycle path. It climbs gently up into the surrounding chain of hills and takes cyclists via Oechsen to Dermbach and the Felda Valley Cycleway. In Geisa a cycle part branches off to the Second World War memorial site of Point Alpha. On the trackbed of the old railway line through the Ulster valley the route reaches the historic little town of Tann.

=== Tann < 53 km – 127 km > ===
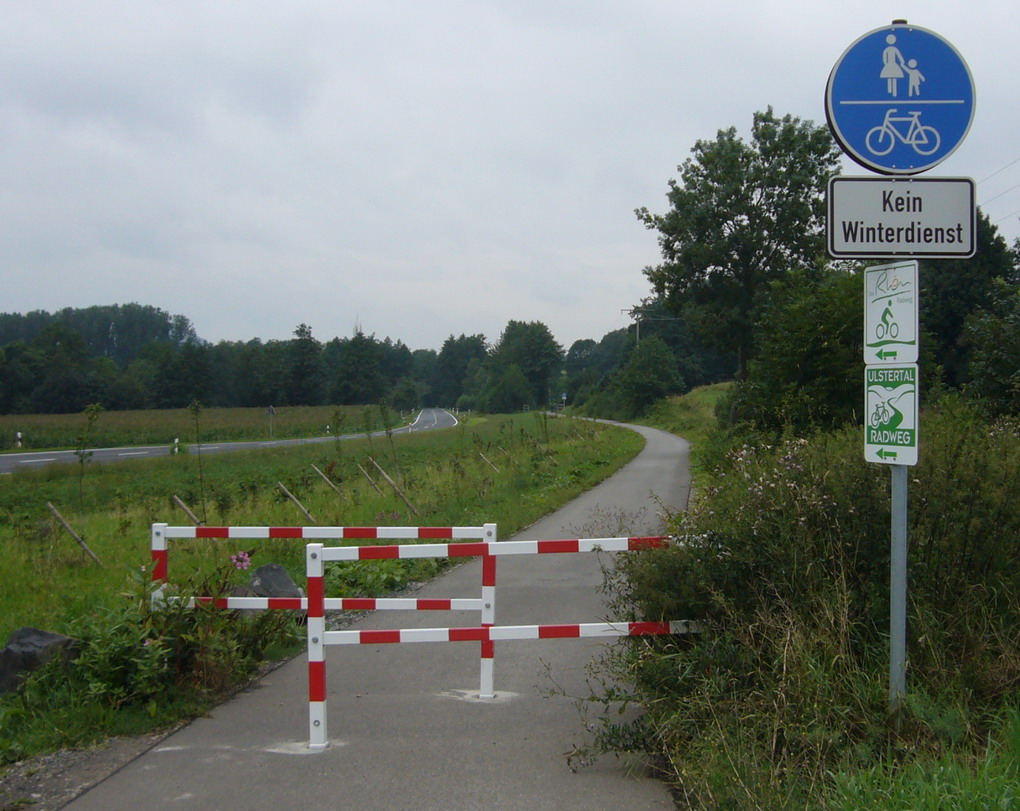
Cycle path at Tann/Rhön, signage

The fate of Tann has for centuries always been associated with the border. Formerly it lay on the boundary between the territories of the bishops of Würzburg, the abbots of Fulda, the Hessian landgraves, the counts of Henneberg and their successors, the dukes of Saxony. So Tann initially belonged to Fulda before becoming an imperial estate; it became Bavarian in 1806, then Prussia and, in 1945, Hessian. Until German Unity Tann was a border community in the GDR. Lying beside a farm track beside the banks of the Ulster and a narrow road that links sleepy little Ulster villages, the route makes its way to Hilders. A few hundred metres beyond the hamlet of Aura. the Milseburg Cycleway branches off.

=== Hilders < 64 km – 116 km > ===
For experienced cyclists Hilders is integrated into the mountainbike route network of the Rhön.

In Hilders the High Rhön Cycleway branches off as a variant of the Rhön Cycleway. The Rhön Cycleway itself remains in the valley and passes through the holiday villages of Thaiden, Seiferts and Melperts (OT of Ehrenberg) to the climatic spa of Wüstensachsen in the upper Ulster valley.

=== Wüstensachsen < 73 km – 107 km > ===
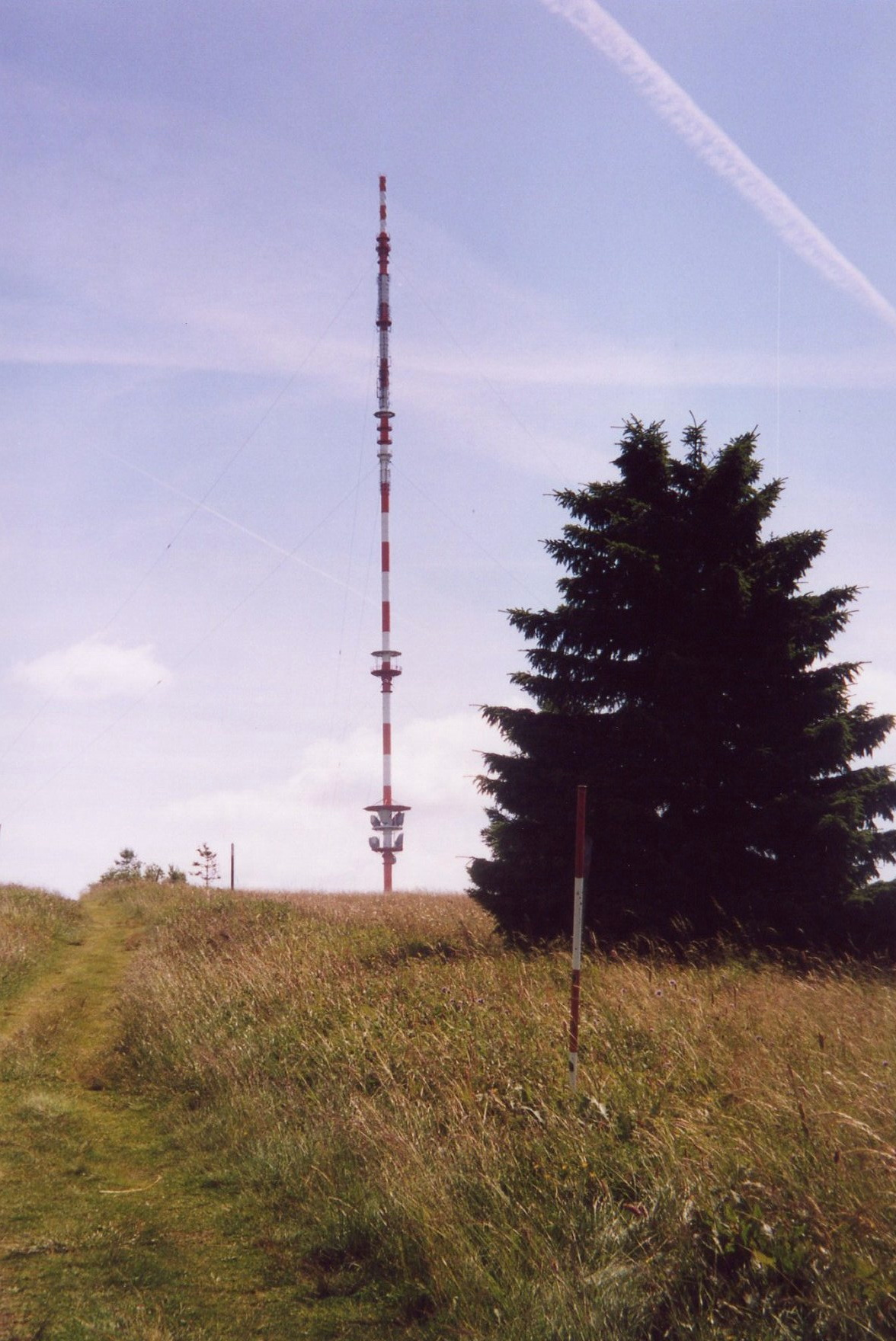
Heidelstein

The most important nature reserves of the Rhön and the core zones of the Rhön Biosphere Reserve lie around Wüstensachsen and may easily be reached on the Rhön Cycleway or over the well constructed mountainbike route network. In Wüstensachsen the Rhön Cycleway begins to climb up to the Long Rhön to a height of a good 800 metres. The gradient averages 5% and runs through lush meadows and beech forest to the Schornhecke car park where it meets the High Rhön Panorama Road (just below the Heidelstein).

=== Hochrhön < 81 km – 99 km > ===
Just under 2 kilometres after the Schornhecke car park the High Rhön and Rhön cycleways meet again before rolling through the High Rhön countryside past the Thuringian Hut, a former customs house (managed), and the Rhön Club hut of Schweinfurter Haus (managed, overnight accommodation), descending into the valleys of the Franconian Rhön.

Through the timber-framed village of Urspringen, where the Bahra rises as a ready-made stream from the church, the route arrives at Oberelsbach. Tip: In Urspringen the Rhön-Sinn Valley Cycleway branches off leading to Fladungen. At its far end, in Mellrichstadt, is the possibility of catching the train back to Bad Salzungen.

=== Oberelsbach < 92 km – 88 km > ===
The village lies in the middle of the Rhön, surrounded by its outlying hamlets. Tip: In Oberelsbach the Els Valley Cycleway branches off towards Bad Neustadt. The main route now runs on the level along the eastern slopes of the High Rhön. From the Bischofsheim village of Unterweißenbrunn it is an easy ride along the old railway bed to Bischofsheim.

=== Bischofsheim < 104 km – 76 km > ===
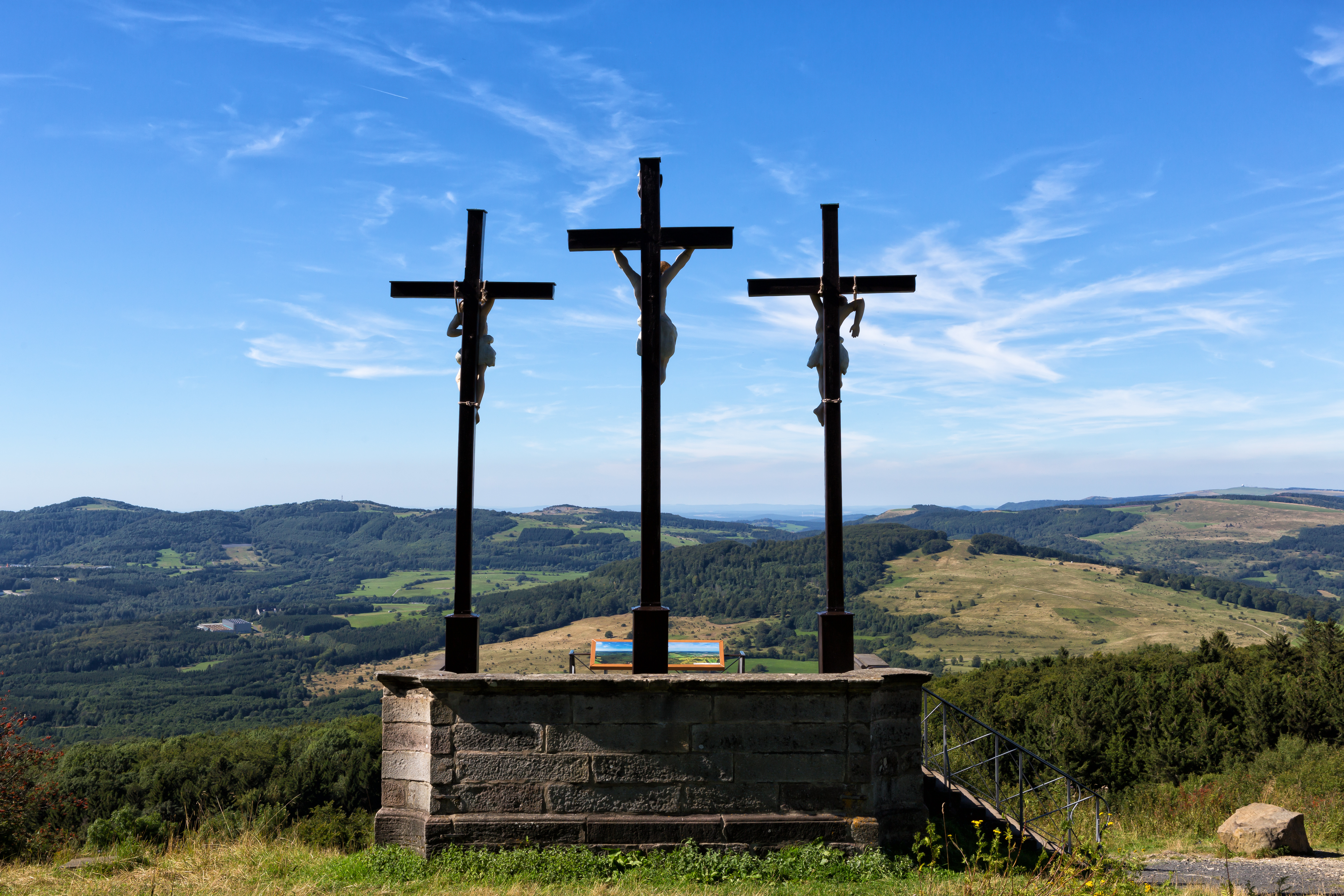
Golgotha crosses near Kreuzberg Abbey by Bischofsheim

At the foot of the Kreuzberg lies the state-recognised spa of Bischofsheim. The symbol of the town, the late Romanesque tower dating to the 13th century, the historic revenue office and the mostly well preserved town wall give Bischofsheim a medieval air. The continuation of the Rhön Cycleway runs initially to Unterweißenbrunn again on the same path and then carries on through the Brend valley to Bad Neustadt in the valley of the Franconian Saale.

=== Bad Neustadt < 123 km – 67 km > ===
Bad Neustadt is like a turnstile for cyclists. From here cycle paths run to Meiningen, to the River Main to Schweinfurt and Würzburg, to Fulda, to the source of the Franconian Saale and of course to Bad Salzungen. From the Cyclist Information Point (Radler-Info-Punkt) the route runs initially through the Kurpark and the Kurviertel quarter of Bad Neustadt, then through the village of Salz, in which the lost palace of Charlemagne is purported to be.

=== Niederlauer < 129 km – 51 km > ===
Tipp: In Niederlauer zweigt der Radfernweg Main-Werra ab, der nach Schweinfurt zum Main-Radweg bzw. weiter nach Würzburg führt.

=== Bad Kissingen < 155 km – 25 km > ===
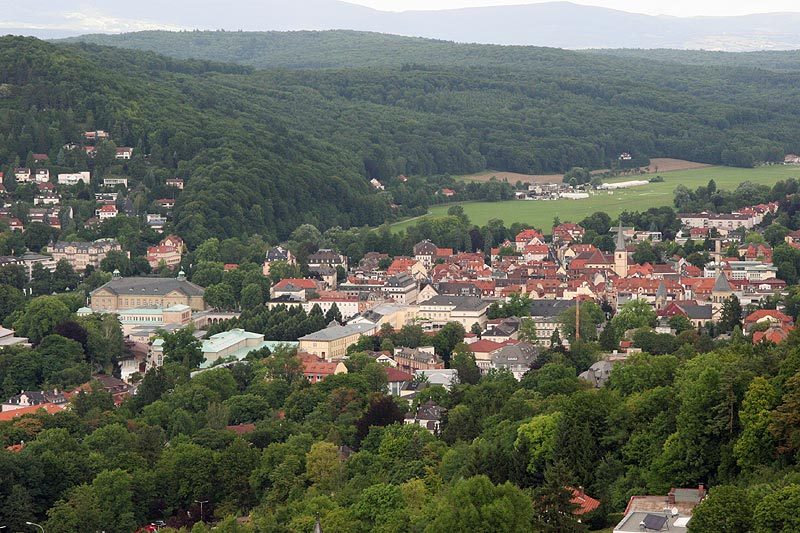
Bad Kissingen

At the end of the Kurpark in Bad Kissingen the route crosses the Saale Bridge to the left bank. As far as Markt Euerdorf the route continues near the Franconian Saale. At the golf course a side branch of the Bavarian Cyclist Network (Bayernnetzes für Radler) goes to Schweinfurt on the Main (river).

=== Hammelburg < 180 km – 0 km > ===
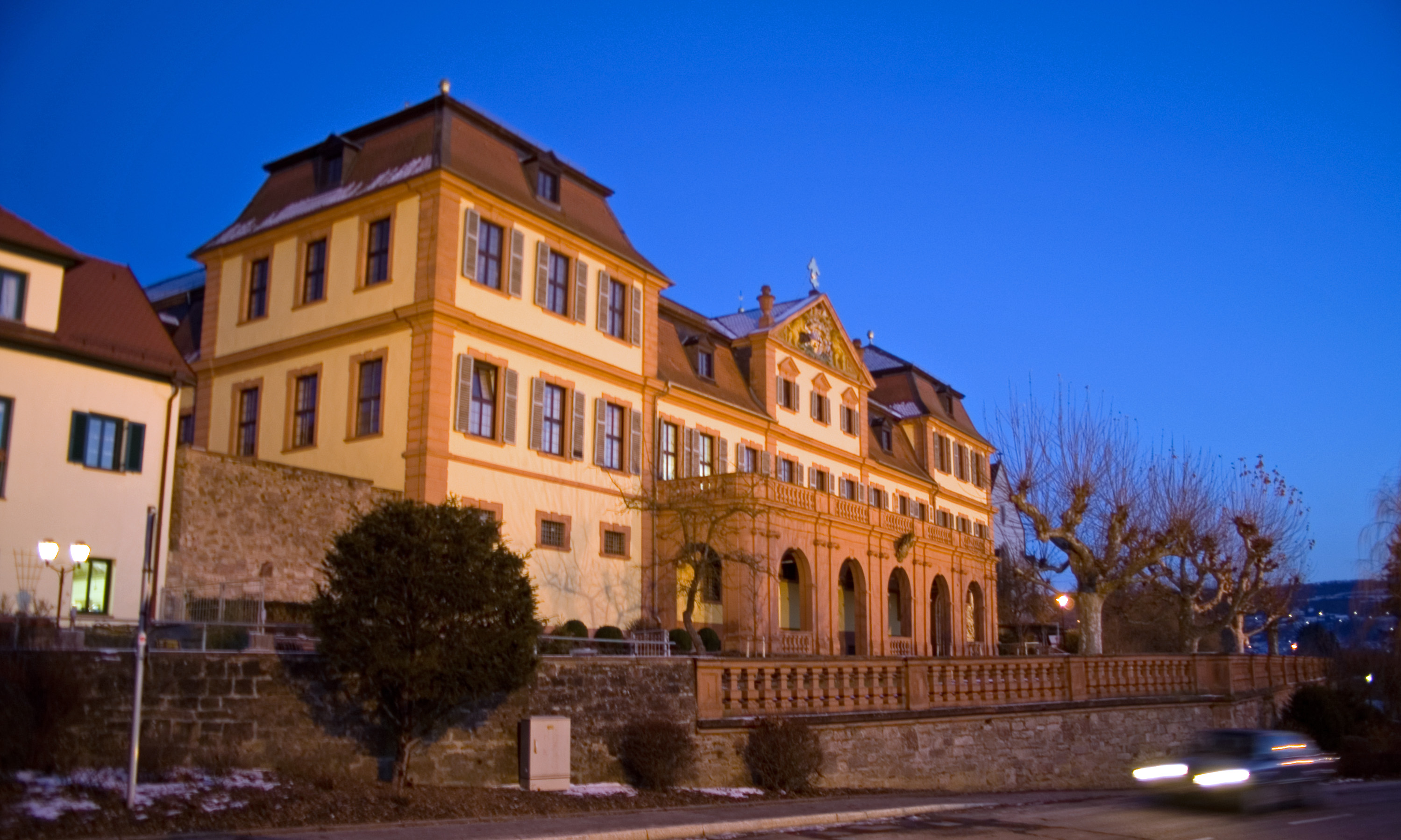
Kellereischloss Hammelburg

Like many wine places, Hammelburg has a unique atmosphere. It is recorded as early as 716 as hamulo castellum. Its claim to be the birthplace of Franconian wine is based on a document - the oldest original one in Bavaria, held in the Würzburg State Archives. This document confirms that on 7 January 777, Charlemagne, there were vineyards in Hammelburg. Since that time the life of the town has been closely linked to viticulture.

== Literature ==
- Radwanderkarte – Leporello Rhönradweg 1 : 50 000 (in German), Geseke: Publicpress-Verlag, ISBN 978-3-89920-394-3
- Rhönradweg. Radwanderkarte 1 : 50 000 (in German), BVA Bielefelder Verlag; Auflage: 1., Aufl. (5. April 2006), ISBN 978-3-87073-403-9
