= High Rhön Road =

Street in Germany

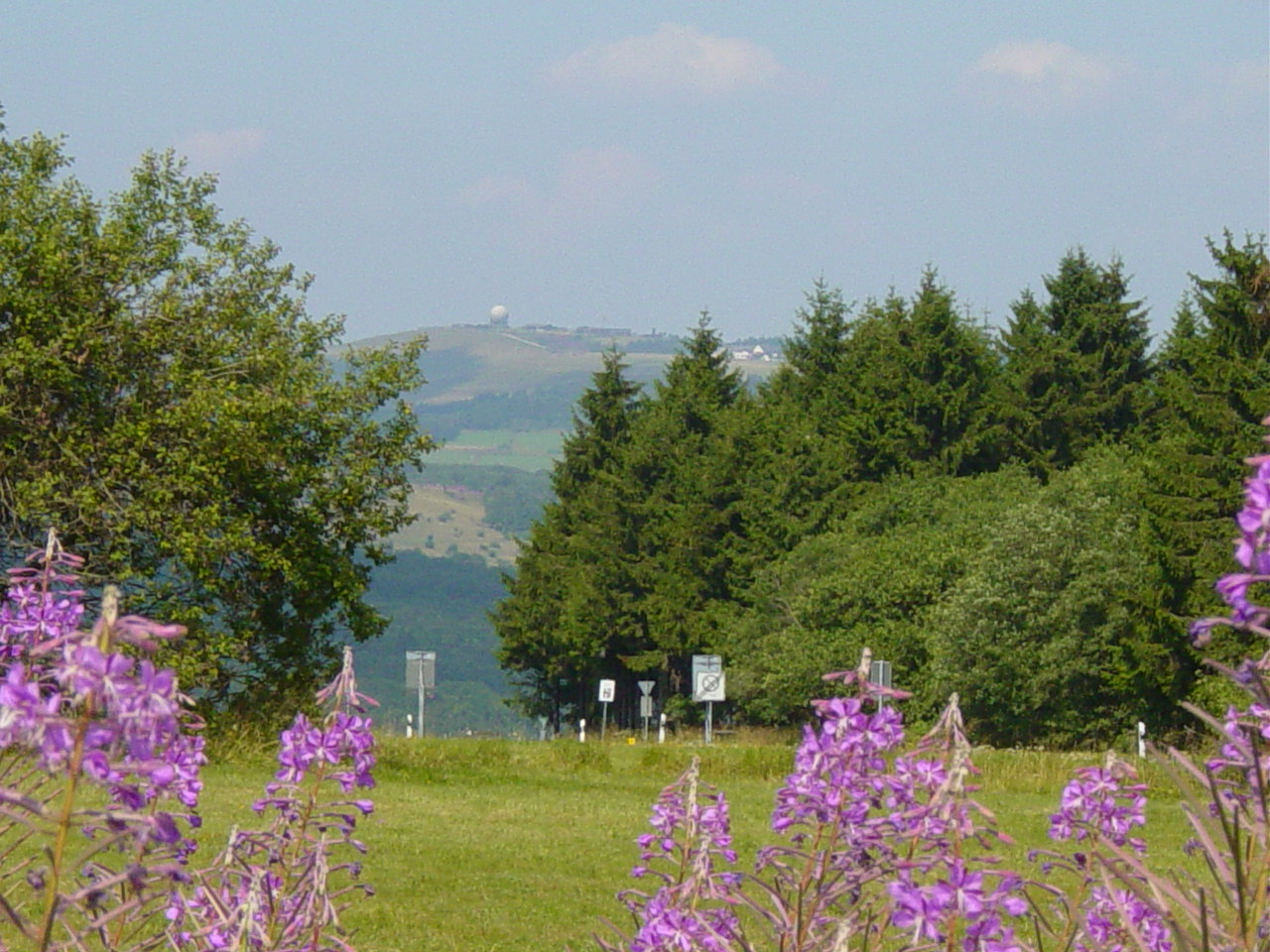
View from the High Rhön Road of the Wasserkuppe

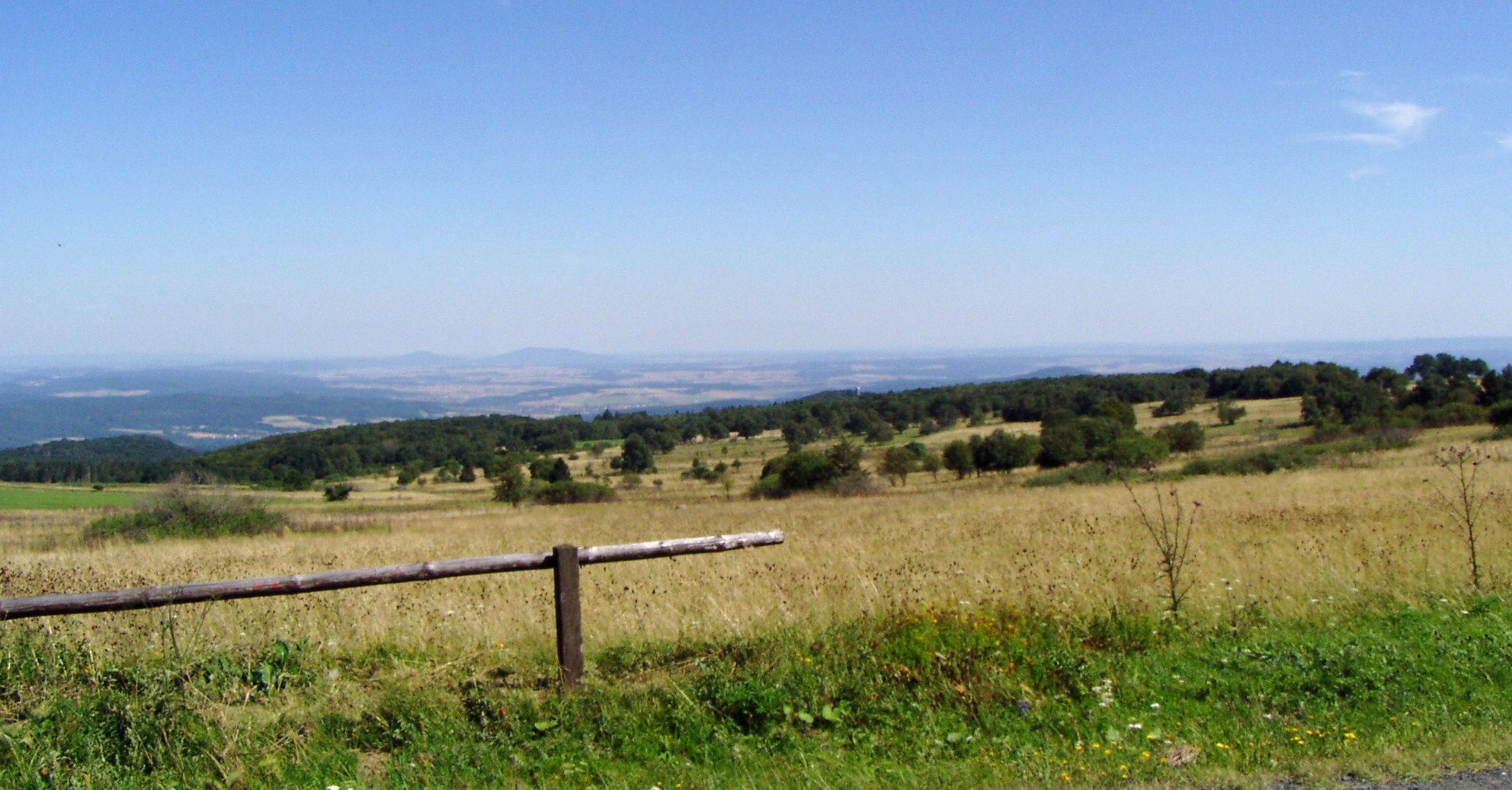
View from the High Rhön Road

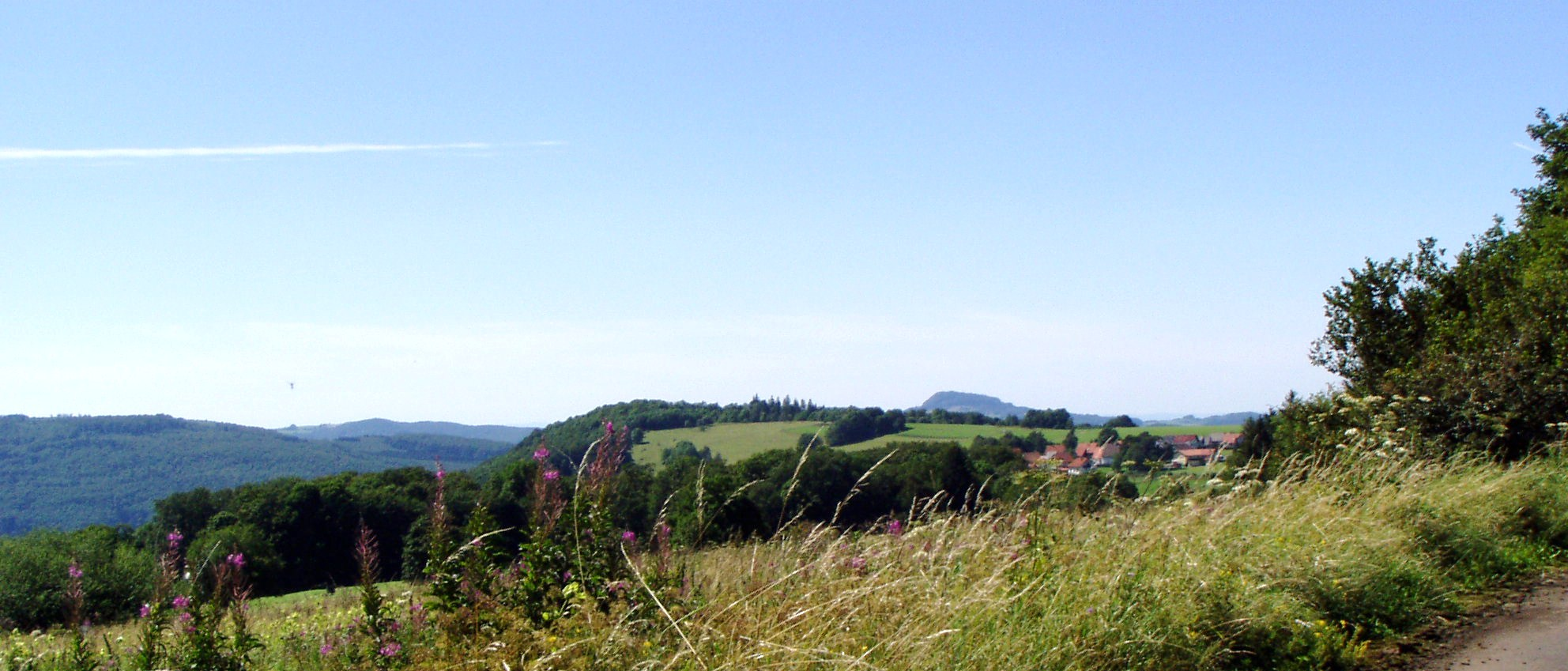
View from the High Rhön Road

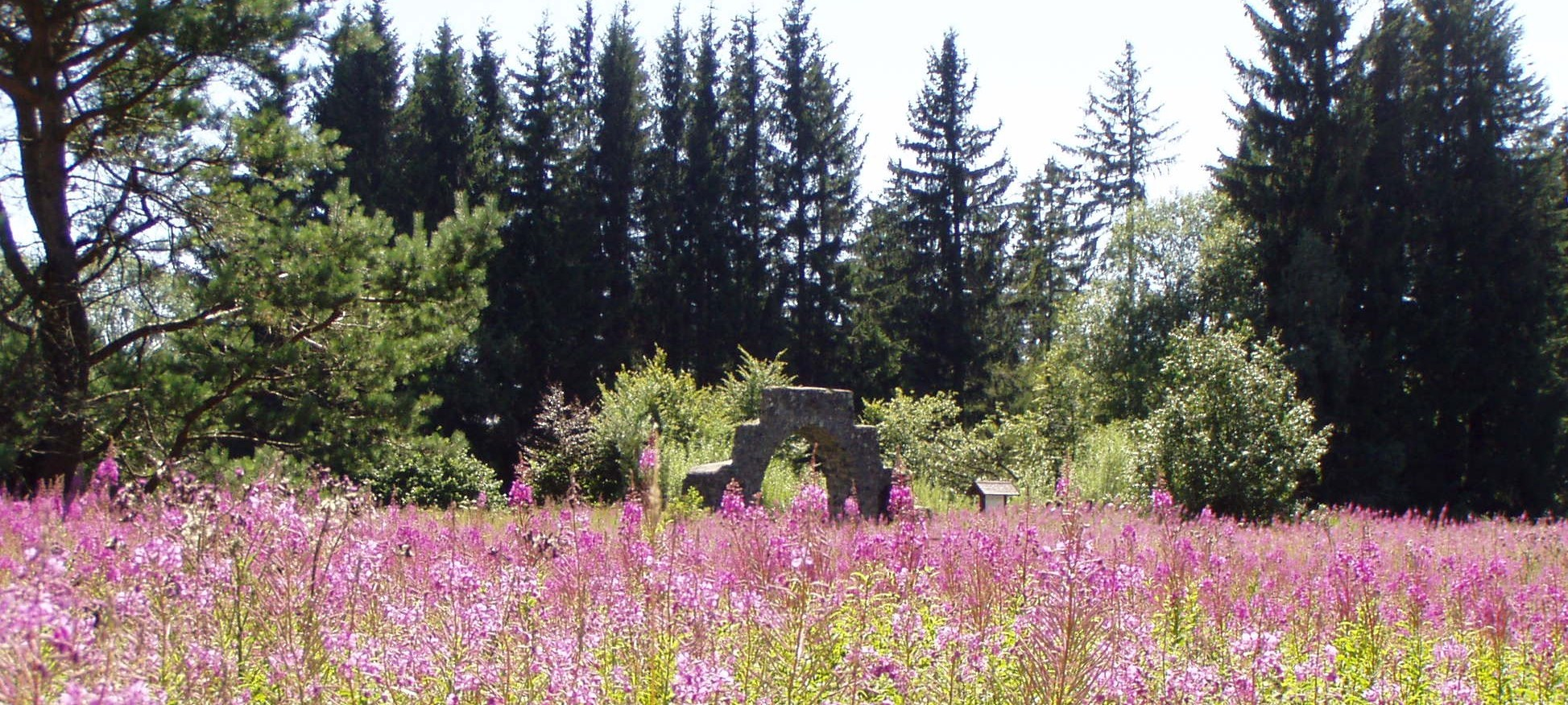
Entrance to the old Reichsarbeitsdienst camp on the Black Moor

The High Rhön Road (German: Hochrhönstraße) runs through the Bavarian Rhön from Bischofsheim an der Rhön to Fladungen (south to north). It bears the state road number St 2288, is 25 kilometres long, runs over the central highlands of the Rhön, known as the Long Rhön, and is an important communication link in the High Rhön. In winter the High Rhön Road in the Long Rhön is often closed due to heavy snowfall and winds that block the road with snowdrifts.

== History ==
The High Rhön Road was planned in the 1930s and construction began at the outset of the Second World War. The work was carried out by the Reichsarbeitsdienst, but it was gravelled and not tarmacked until after the end of the war.

The counties of Bad Neustadt and Mellrichstadt agreed in 1958 to take over the road and upgrade it. With considerably help from the treasury of the Free State of Bavaria it was surfaced with tarmac. The High Rhön Road was opened to traffic by the then Bavarian State Secretary for the Interior Ministry, Alfons Goppel, on 19 October 1958 in a ceremony in Fladungen.

== Route ==
The kilometrage of the High Rhön Road runs from Bischofsheim towards Fladungen. The zero point lies in Bischofsheim in the upper Brend valley at the crossroads with the St 2088 at a height of about 440 metres above sea level (NN).

The High Rhön Road climbs steadily from there, crosses the B 279 at 476 meters above sea level and runs in curves, following the Schwarzbach stream, up to the Bauersberg and past the Rothsee at kilometre 4 by and past the Holzberghof Hunting Lodge at kilometre 6. From here the High Rhön Road enters the Rhön Biosphere Reserve at about 800 metres above sea level and reaches the highlands of the Rhön (Long Rhön). From here parking is only permitted at designated car parks and there is a reduced winter service (no salting). The High Rhön Road runs about 840 metres east past the 926-metrek-high Heidelstein. From the east it is joined by the road from Ginolfs.

A central crossing point in the High Rhön is at the Schornhecke, on the northern slopes of the Heidelstein, at kilometre 10. Here the road is joined by the St 2286 from Oberelsbach to the east, and by the Landstraße (L) 3395 Wüstensachsen in the state of Hesse. The road runs eastwards past the Steinkopf (888 m) and the Stirnberg (902 m) and continues to the Black Moor. On this section it is joined from the east by roads from the Thuringian Hut (Thüringer Hütte), from Roth, Hillenberg and Hausen.

At the Black Moor, at kilometre 18 and a height of 787 metres, the High Rhön Road leaves the Long Rhön and biosphere reserve and winds its way down to Fladungen. At kilometre 25 and roughly 410 metres above sea level, the High Rhön Road ends at its junction with the B 285.

The highest point of the High Rhön Road is about 840 metres above sea level at a point east of the Heidelstein and the Stirnberg. The route runs east of the main crest of the High Rhön.

== Literature ==
- Max Mölter: The High Rhön Road. Verlag Parzeller Fulda, 5th edition, 1986, ISBN 3-7900-0149-X.

== See also ==
- Hochrhönring
