= Long Rhön =

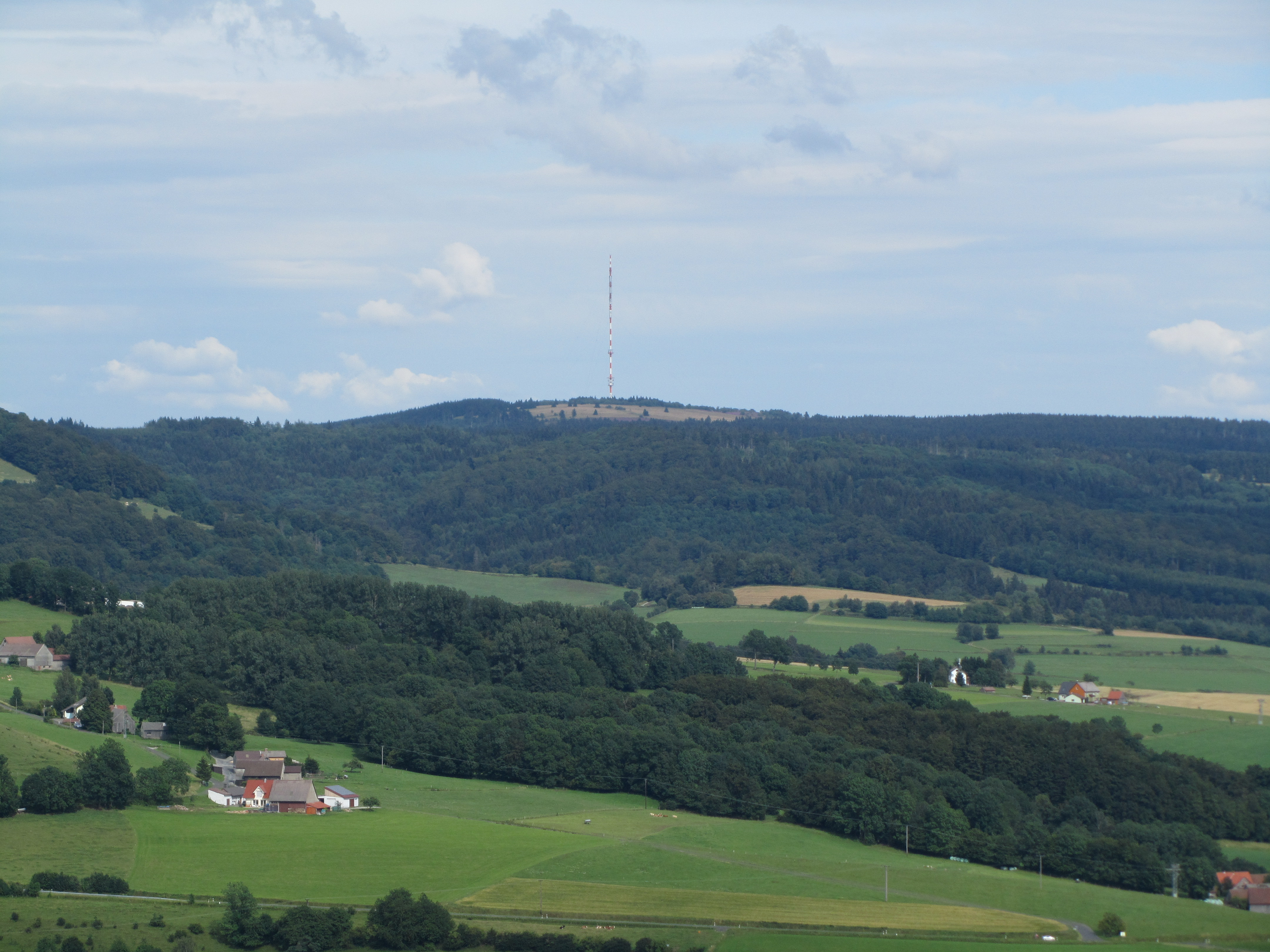
- View of the Heidelstein

Highest point
- Peak: Heidelstein
- Elevation: 926 m above NHN

Geography
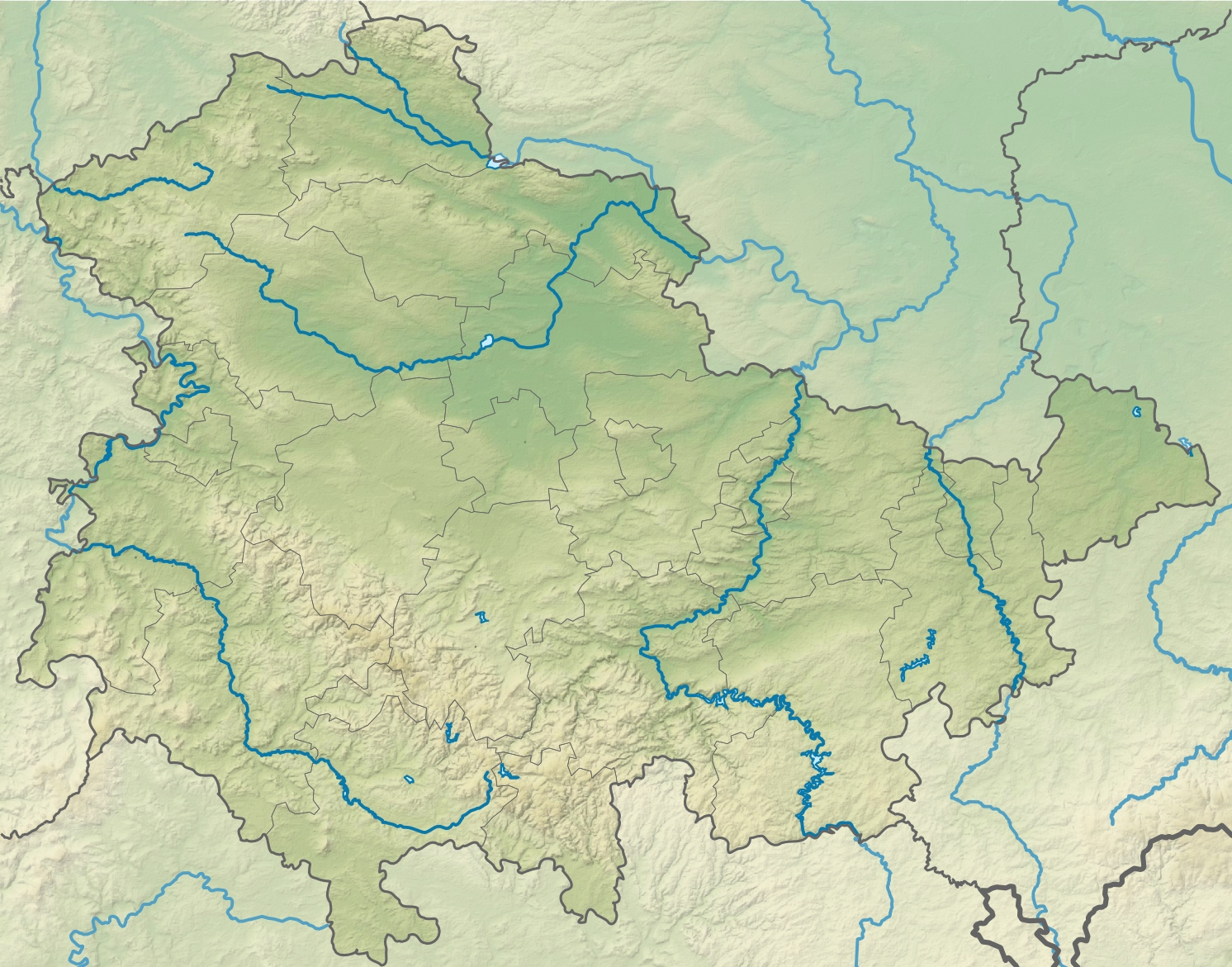
- Location within Bavaria Location within Thuringia
- State(s): Fulda District, Hesse, Rhön-Grabfeld District, Bavaria, Schmalkalden-Meiningen District, Thuringia (Germany)
- Range coordinates: 50°27′31″N 10°00′24″E
- Parent range: High Rhön, Rhön

The Long Rhön (German: Lange Rhön) is a ridge in the Central Rhön which forms part of the High Rhön within the Rhön Mountains. The Long Rhön is an elongated basalt plateau in the centre, roughly 800 metres above sea level, which is only occasional interrupted by mountain peaks. Its highest mountain is the Heidelstein (926 m above sea level (NHN)). A majority of the area is part of the Long Rhön Nature Reserve. In this area of the Rhön is the Black Moor.

== Natural region grouping ==
The Long Rhön was first defined in 1968 as part of the natural region classification (M = 1:200,000) as a natural region and grouped as follows:

- (to 35 East Hessian Highlands)
  - (to 354 High Rhön)
    - (to 354.1 Central Rhön)
      - 354.11 Long Rhön

== Boundaries ==
The boundary of the Long Rhön in the west along the Ulster valley may be taken from Hilders to its source roughly on the 600-metre-contour. The B 278 and an imaginary line several hundred metres west to roughly the height of the Rhönhaus separates it from the Wasserkuppen Rhön. The treeline as far as the Rhönkopf may be taken as the boundary with the Eastern slopes of the Long Rhön to the south and east of the area, continued by an imaginary line running north-northeast to the L1123 near Reichenhausen. The boundary in the north with the Auersberg Kuppenrhön is once again the 600-metre-contour and thuse circumnavigates the Buchschirm.

== Mountains ==
- Heidelstein(926 m; west of Oberelsbach; Heidelstein transmitter)
  - Schwabenhimmel (912.6 m; eastern spur with a memorial site for the Rhön Club)
    - Maihügel (775 m; eastern spur)
  - Münzkopf (849.0 m; southern spur)
  - Ottilienstein (846.4 m; Nordwestausläufer)
  - Hoher Dentschberg (777.4 m; southeastern spur)
- Stirnberg (901.9 m;)
  - Huckel (829 m;northeastern spur)
- Hangenberg (809.1 m;southeastern spur)
- Steinkopf (Wüstensachsen) (888 m; nature reserve)
- Hohe Dalle (862.0 m;)
- Schnitzersberg (815.5 m; highest mountain in the Thuringian Rhön)
  - Ellenbogen (Rhön) (813.2 m; northern spur, Rhön Clubhouse, Eisenacher Haus)
    - Schafküppel (806.8 m; northern spur)
      - Weidberg (724.9 m;)
    - Steinköpfchen (738.1 m;north-northeastern spurof the Ellenbogen)
  - Buchschirm (745.2 m; western spur, with an observation platform)
  - Espenhauck (664.6 m; western spur)
- Querenberg (Rhön) (804.8 m;)
  - Rhönhof (794.1 m; eastern spur; unnamed summit, but a top with over 15 metres prominence)
    - Bloßberg (743.3 m; eastern spur)
- Grabenberg (796.2 m; site of a former East German border tower)
- Ilmenberg (787.1 m; ski area by the Thüringer Hut)
- Rhönkopf (779.7 m; also called the Salkenberg or Heimatblick after the memorial site to East German refugees)
- Dungberg (772.7 m;)

== Climate and Vegetation ==
In 1969, Frankenheim had the following climatic statistics: 940 mm of precipitation, about 125 days of mist and fog during the year, and an average annual temperature of 5.1 °C. As a result of centuries of deforestation a harsh, grassland countryside has evolved on the Long Rhön. Reforestation was not undertaken until 1815. Over 80% of the land is used for agriculture.
