= Wasserkuppen Rhön =

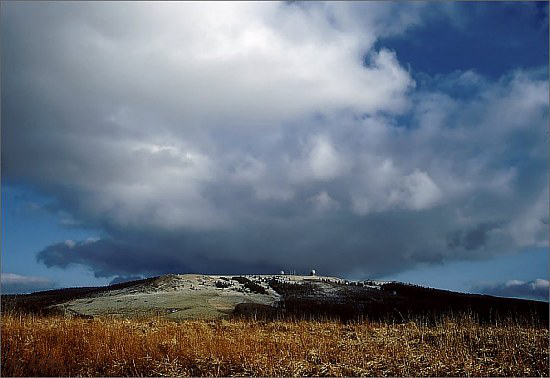
- View of the Wasserkuppe

Highest point
- Peak: Wasserkuppe
- Elevation: 950 m above NHN

Geography
- Location within Bavaria
- State(s): Fulda, Hesse, Rhön-Grabfeld, Bavaria (Germany)
- Range coordinates: 50°29′53″N 9°56′16″E
- Parent range: High Rhön, Rhön

The Wasserkuppen Rhön or Wasserkuppenrhön, named after its highest peak, also the highest summit in the entire Rhön Mountains, the Wasserkuppe (950 m above sea level (NHN)), is an exposed highland ridge and natural region in the Hessian county of Fulda and Bavarian county of Rhön-Grabfeld. Together with the Long Rhön and its eastern flank it forms the Central Rhön. The Red Moor lies within this natural region.

== Natural region grouping ==
The name Wasserkuppenrhön was defined in 1968 as part of the natural regional division of Germany (M = 1:200,000) as a natural region and grouped as follows:

- (to 35 East Hesse Highlands)
  - (to 354 High Rhön)
    - (to 354.1 Central Rhön)
      - 354.10 Wasserkuppen Rhön

In the south the region is rather uniform, in the north and northwest it is dominated by foothills and isolated peaks. The land is almost treeless in the north whereas, in the south, coniferous and mixed woods form part of the landscape.

== Mountains ==
The following mountains - sorted by height in metres above sea level (NHN) lie within the Wasserkuppen Rhön:

- Wasserkuppe (950.0 m), between Abtsroda and Obernhausen
- Abtsrodaer Kuppe (904.8 m), north spur of the Wasserkuppe
- Pferdskopf (874.9 m), near Obernhausen
- Mathesberg (831.8 m), near Wüstensachsen
- Schafstein (831.8 m), near Wüstensachsen
- Eubeberg (ca. 820 m), near Obernhausen
- Ehrenberg (816.5 m), near Ehrenberg
- Feldberg (815.2 m), near Obernhausen
- Kesselstein (ca. 800 m), near Mosbach
- Weiherberg (785.7 m), near Abtsroda and Dietges
