= Abtsrodaer Kuppe =

Mountain peak in Hesse, Germany

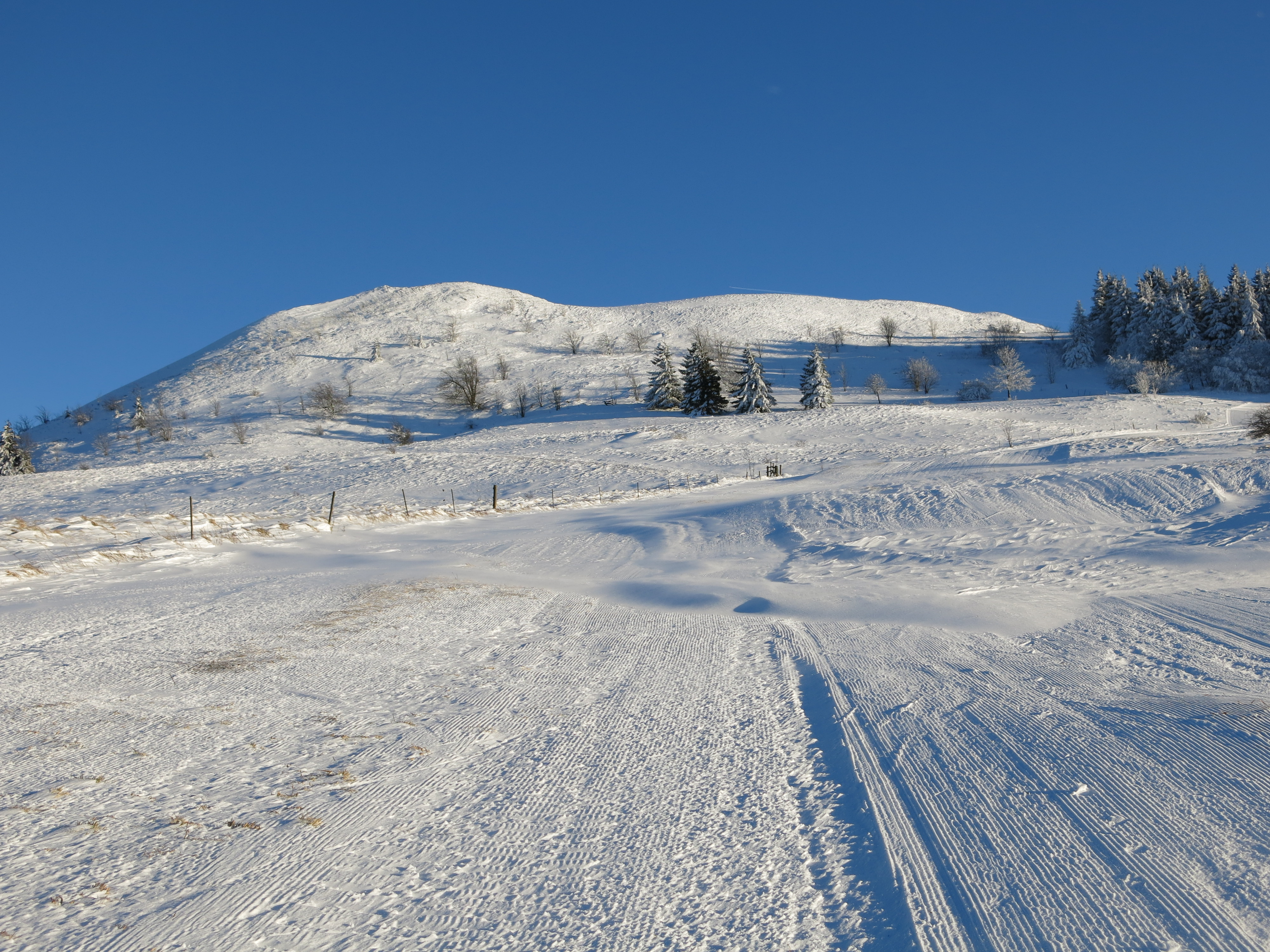
- Abtrsoder Kuppe seen from northwest

Highest point
- Elevation: 904 m (2,966 ft)
- Listing: List of mountains of Hesse
- Coordinates: 50°30′16″N 9°56′17″E

Geography
- Location within Hesse
- Location: Hesse, Germany
- Parent range: Rhön Mountains

Abtsrodaer Kuppe is a mountain in Hesse, Germany. It is close to the summit of Wasserkuppe and belongs to the Rhön Mountains. The mountain is characterized by its treeless summit formed from basalt rocks, making it a popular vantage point, especially when looking north.

== Geography ==
=== Location ===
The Abtsrodaer Kuppe rise is located in the High Rhön. It is part of the Hessian Rhön Nature Park and the Rhön Biosphere Reserve. Its summit lies approximately 740 m north-northeast of the Wasserkuppe, 1.1 km east-southeast of Abtsroda, and 2 km east of Sieblos. Both villages are districts of Poppenhausen, to which the summit region belongs. 2.8 km northeast of the summit is the Ehrenberg district of Reulbach. Somewhat further away are two districts of the municipality of Hilders; Dietges (north-northwest) and Brand (north-northeast).

=== Natural Region Classification ===
The Abtsrodaer Kuppe belongs to the natural spatial main unit group East Hessian Uplands (No. 35) in the main unit Hohe Rhön (354), subunit Hochrhön (354.1), natural area Wasserkuppenrhön (354.10). To the north, the landscape slopes down into the Milseburger Kuppenrhön natural region (353.21), which belongs to the subunit Kuppenrhön (353.2) in the main unit Vorder- und Kuppenrhön (353).

=== Fulda-Werra Watershed ===
Part of the Fulda-Werra watershed runs across the Abtsrodaer Kuppe. The water from the watercourses flowing westward from the Kuppe reaches the Weser via the Haardt (Lütter) and Lütter streams and the Fulda River. Water from the watercourses flowing northward also reaches the Weser via the Schlichtwasser, Brandbach (Ulster), and Ulster (Werra) streams and the Werra River.

== Protected areas ==
On the northeast flank of the Abtsrodaer Kuppe, directly below the Hochrhönring, lies the Naturschutzgebiet (NSG) Nordhang Wasserkuppe (CDDA No. 318864; designated in 1997; 95 hectares in size). On the summit are parts of the Hessian Rhön landscape conservation area (CDDA no. 378477; 1967; 410.31 km²) and the Hessian Rhön bird sanctuary. (Note: VSG no. 5525-351; 360.8 km^{2}) It also includes parts of the Habitats Directive area Hochrhön. (Note: FFH No. 5525-351; 48.09 km^{2})

== Traffic and hiking ==
The Landesstraße 3307 leads west-northwest past the Abtsrodaer Kuppe from Poppenhausen through Tränkhof and Sieblos to Abtsroda, which meets the L 3068 coming from Dietges at the northeastern edge of Abtsroda. The latter leads north past the hilltop and then up to the Wasserkuppe and further to the Bundesstraße 278 (Gersfeld–Obernhausen–Wüstensachsen). The three roads are sections of the Hochrhönring. Starting from these roads, the Abtsrodaer Kuppe can be hiked on paths and trails, for example, on the shared section of the European long-distance trails E3 and E6 running between Abtsroda and the Wasserkuppe.

== Gallery ==
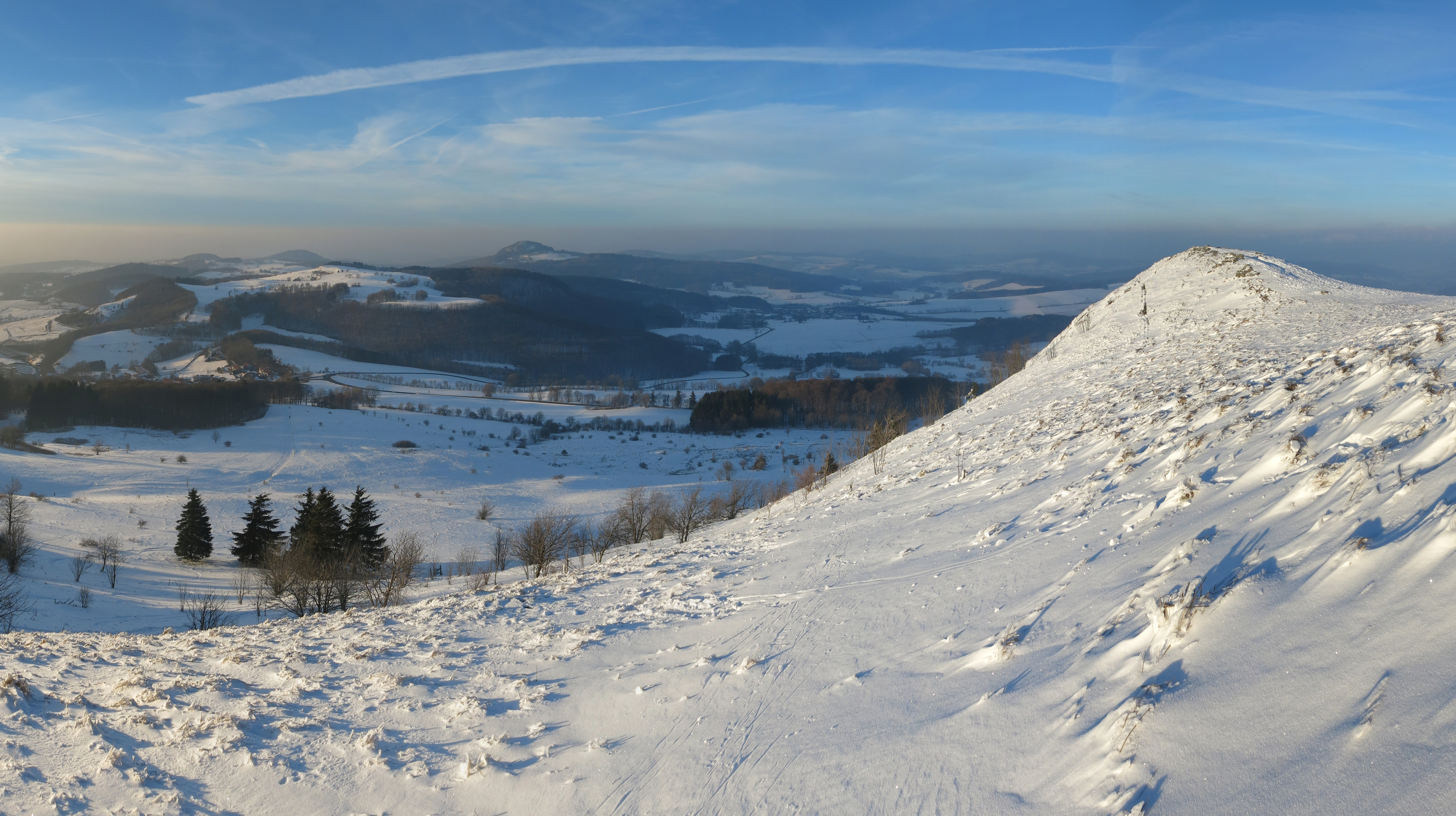
Looking from the Abtsrodaer Kuppe northward over the Rhön Mountains
