= Feldberg (Hessian Rhön) =

Mountain in the Rhön highlands, Hesse, Germany

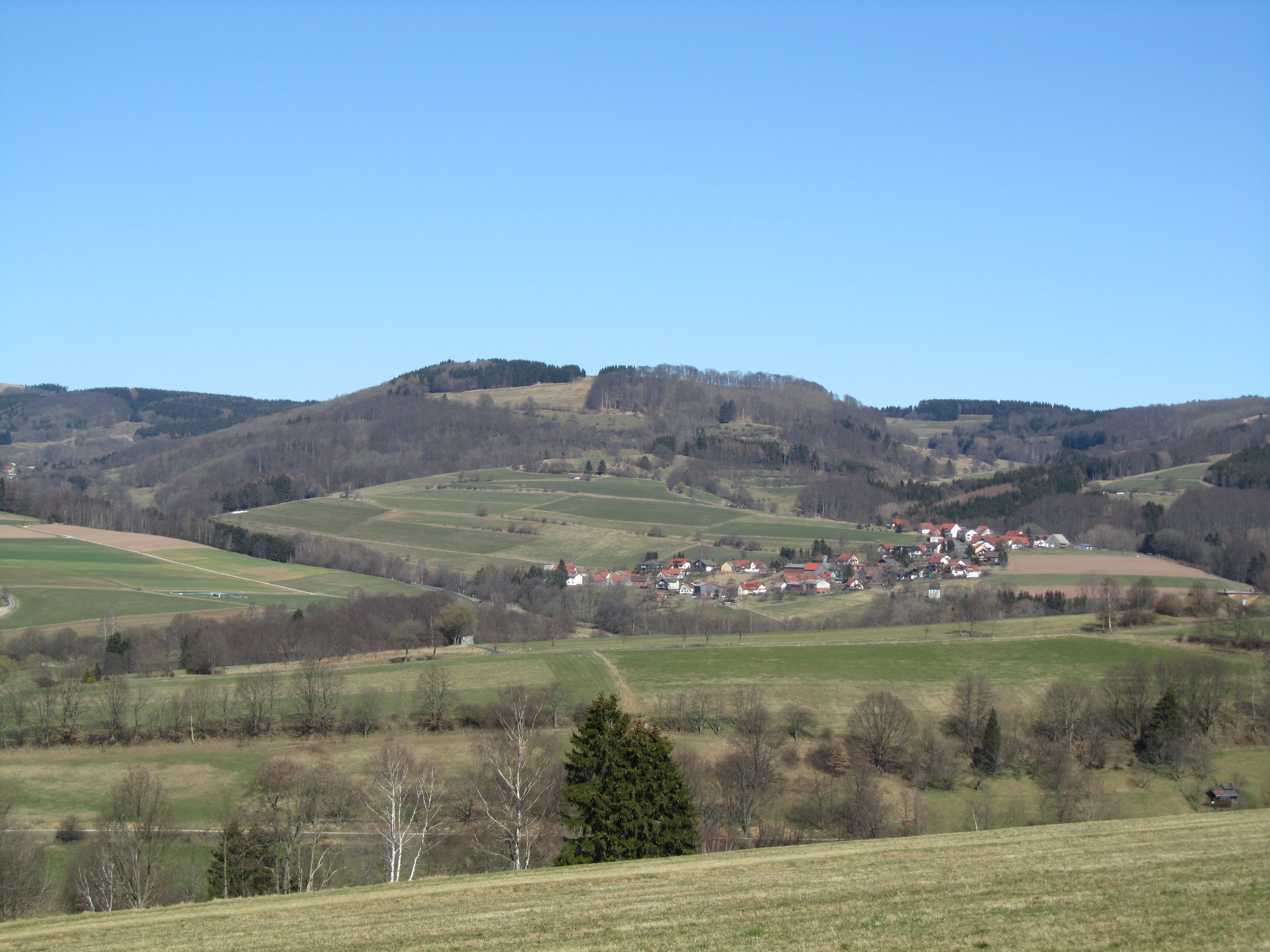
- The Feldberg from the southwest

Highest point
- Elevation: 815.2 m (2,675 ft)
- Coordinates: 50°28′19″N 9°57′03″E

Geography
- Location: Hesse, Germany
- Parent range: Rhön (High Rhön)

The Feldberg (German pronunciation: [ˈfɛltˌbɛʁk]) is a mountain in the Rhön highlands in the German state of Hesse. It is 815.2 m above sea level (NN).

It is located about three kilometres northeast of Gersfeld in the county of Fulda, near the border with Bavaria and is part of the Hessian Rhön Nature Park and the Rhön Biosphere Reserve. The nearest settlements are Obernhausen to the northwest and Sandberg on the southern spurs of the mountain. The Feldberg is a southwestern outpost of the mountain ridge that runs from the Wasserkuppe to the Heidelstein. The youthful Fulda flows past below its western slopes. The section of the B 284 federal road from Gersfeld to Wüstensachsen runs past the Feldberg in a curve to the west and north. A walking trail managed by the Rhön Club, the Extratour Guckaisee, runs over the Feldberg, passing immediately south of the summit. The terrain is used for forestry and, in places, also for pasture.
