= Hochrhönring =

Coordinates: 50°27′00″N 09°55′13″E

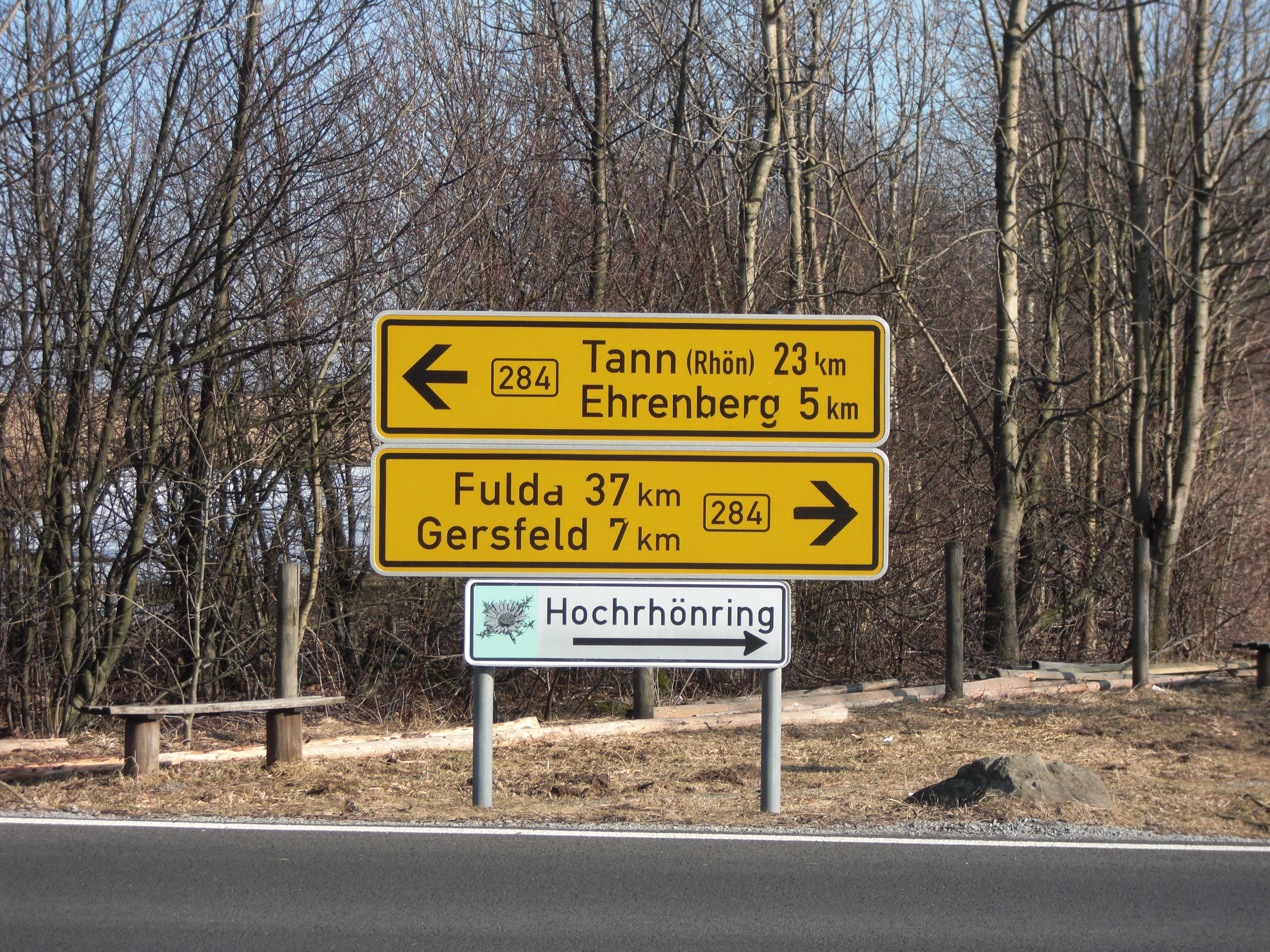
Signposts with the one for the Hochrhönring in white at the bottom

The Hochrhönring (also Hochrhön-Ring) is a 42-kilometre-long holiday route in the Hessian Rhön in Germany.

The route, which opened in 1970, runs in a circle roughly east of Gersfeld past the Feldberg (815 m), the Wasserkuppe (950 m), Abtsroda, Dietges, the Milseburg (835 m), Kleinsassen, Wolferts, Poppenhausen and Gackenhof and back to Gersfeld.

The route is signposted with signs that display the black lettering Hochrhönring on a white background, usually with a thistle on a dark green background (which is often rather faded).

The route is popular with motorcyclists and is sometimes nicknamed "the Route 66 of the Rhön".

== See also ==
- Hochrhönstraße
