= Heidelstein transmitter =

Transmitter site in Bavaria, Germany

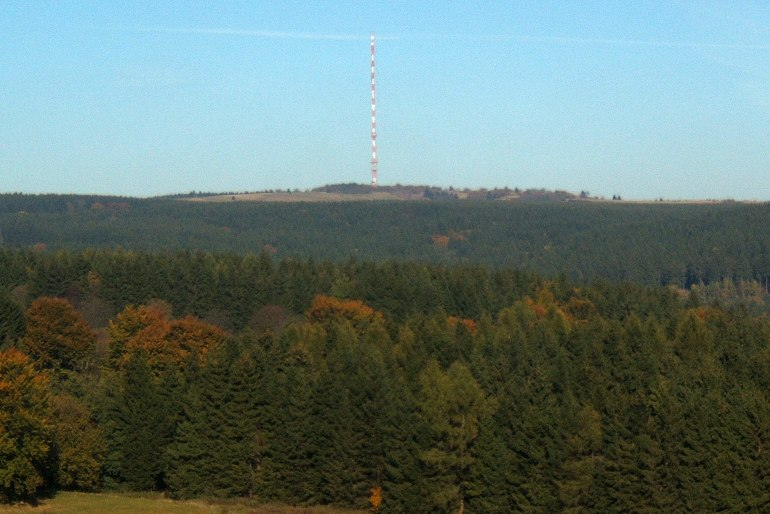
- Heidelstein transmitter

- Location within Bavaria
- Location: Heidelstein
- Mast height: 218 m (715 ft)
- Coordinates: 50°27′31″N 10°00′24″E
- Built: 1969

The Heidelstein transmitter is a facility for FM and TV broadcasting on the Heidelstein mountain in the Rhön, Germany. It uses as an antenna, a 218-metre tall guyed mast of tubular steel, which weighs 245 tons, and it was built in 1969. The Heidelstein transmitter is the property of Deutsche Telekom.

== See also ==
- List of famous transmission sites
