= RRG Urubu Obs =

German two-/three-seat glider, 1932

Urubu Obs

General information
- Type: Meteorological research glider
- National origin: Germany
- Manufacturer: Rhön-Rossitten Gesellschaft (RRG)
- Designer: Alexander Lippisch
- Number built: 1

History
- First flight: 1932

The RRG Urubu Obs (the Urubu is an Argentinian Vulture), often known just as the RRG Obs, was a one-off, large, two or three seat glider designed for meteorological observations by Alexander Lippisch in Germany and first flown in 1932.

== Design and development ==
In 1931 Professor Walter Georgii, an academic meteorologist and head of the Rhön-Rossitten Gesellschaft (RRG) asked Alexander Lippisch to design a glider for meteorological research. In addition to the pilot, space was required for two observers or, more usually, one with a variety of meteorological instruments, so the Urubu Obs had to be a large glider.

Its wooden high gull wing had a rectangular centre section, occupying about 20% of the overall 26 m (85 ft 4 in) span and mounted with marked dihedral. On each side a pair of rearwards leaning N-form lift struts braced the end of this section to the lower fuselage longeron. The outer panels had no dihedral and were strongly straight tapered, with a taper ratio of 1:4.7, though the trailing edges were unswept. They were also strongly tapered in thickness. Its large area wing and consequent low wing loading meant the Obs flew slowly. The thin, narrow chord wing tips carried endplate fins; like those on some of Lippisch's Storch tailless gliders, these carried rudders that were coupled to the conventional rear rudder, assisting it and allowing the Obs to have a short fuselage. The trailing edge of each outer panel carried three equal span ailerons. The outer one, together with that on the other wing, acted as differential ailerons but the inner pair also served as camber changing flaps. There is some doubt whether or not the wing was fitted with inboard upper surface airbrakes; these may have been added as a result of test flying.

The Obs had a rectangular section, steel tube framed, fabric covered fuselage. Its cockpit, under a multi-piece canopy was ahead of the forward wing root fairing; the wing was carefully merged into the fuselage, with root extensions at both leading and trailing edges. The meteorologists' cabin was under the wing where the fuselage width was 700 mm (27.6 in), with both side and roof windows. Both the pilot and observers entered via a detachable hood; cabin and cockpit were connected via a door. Below them were a side-by-side pair of fixed, semi-recessed landing wheels. The fuselage tapered to the tail, where a short, narrow fin carried a broad chord, triangular, blunt apexed balanced rudder that extended to the keel. Its mass balanced, all-moving tailplane was mounted on inverted V-form struts from its mid-span, forward underside to the lower fuselage, placing it above the fuselage with its leading edge just ahead of the fin.

After flying at the Wasserkuppe in 1932 with the aid of powerful tug aircraft, it was moved to Darmstadt to commence its intended meteorological observations. It was on view at a meteorological conference in Munich in 1934.

== Specifications ==
Data from Sailplanes 1920-1945

General characteristics

- Crew: Two or three
- Length: 8.00 m (26 ft 3 in)
- Wingspan: 26.00 m (85 ft 4 in)
- Wing area: 38 m^{2} (410 sq ft)
- Aspect ratio: 17.8
- Empty weight: 390 kg (860 lb)
- Gross weight: 640 kg (1,411 lb)

Performance

- Wing loading: 16.8 kg/m^{2} (3.4 lb/sq ft)
