= Buchschirm =

Mountain in Hesse, Germany

Coordinates: 50°34′26″N 10°01′48″E

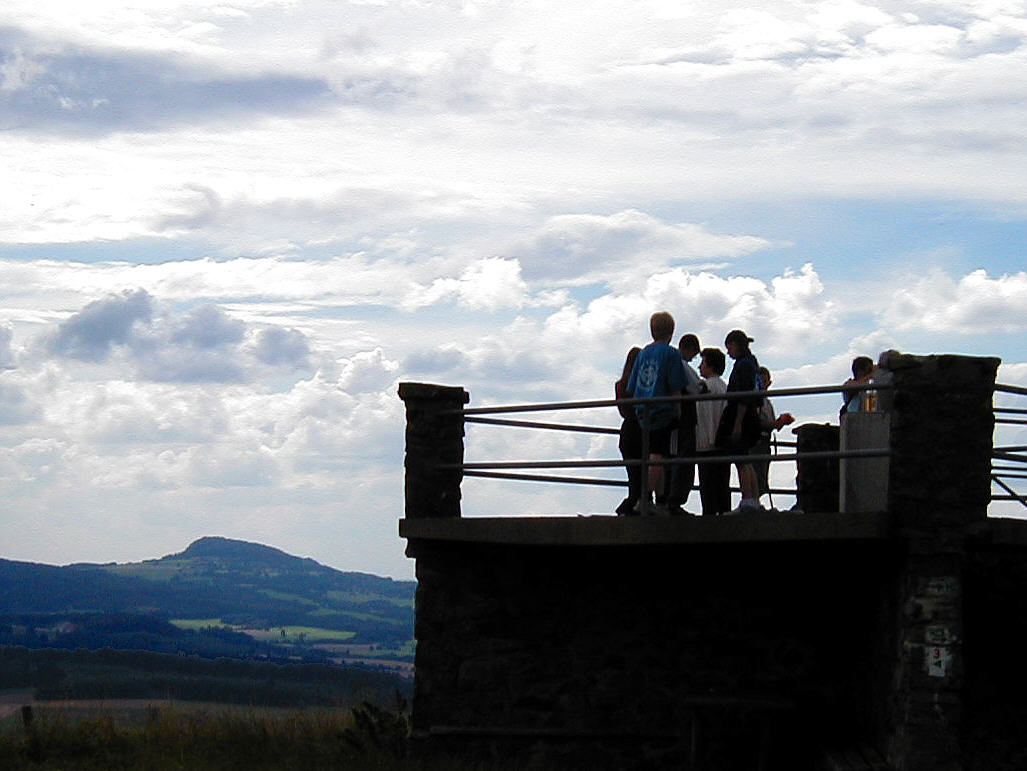
- Buchschirm

Highest point
- Elevation: 745 m (2,444 ft)

Geography
- Location: Hesse, Germany

Buchschirm is a mountain of Hesse, Germany.
