= Heidelstein =

Mountain in Bavaria, Germany

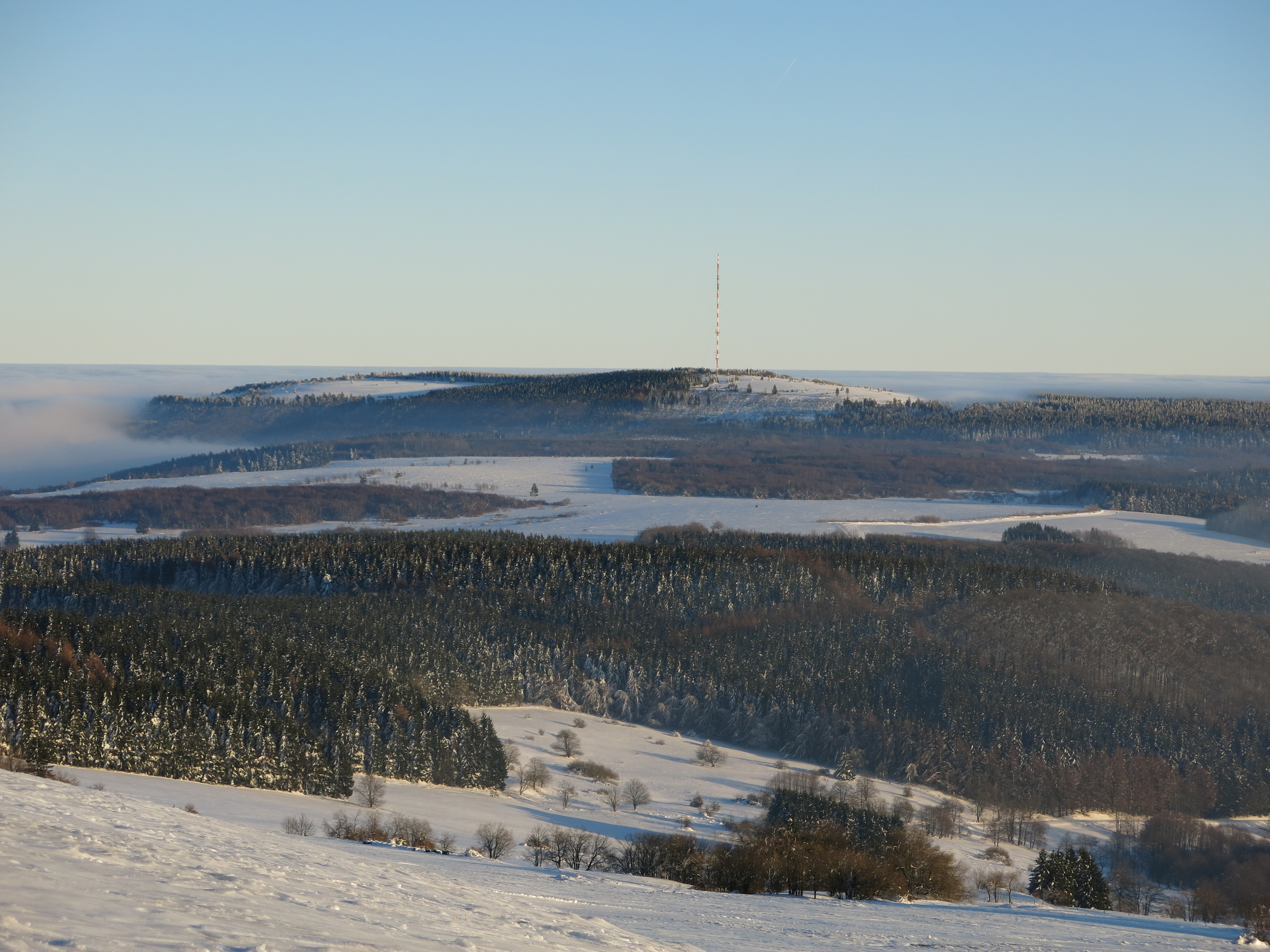
- View from the Wasserkuppe looking southeast to the Heidelstein

Highest point
- Elevation: 925.7 m above sea level (NHN) (3,037 ft)
- Prominence: 110 m
- Isolation: 6.1 km → Wasserkuppe
- Coordinates: 50°27′38″N 10°00′25″E

Geography
- Location within Bavaria
- Location: between Bischofsheim a.d.Rhön and Wüstensachsen; Rhön-Grabfeld, Fulda; Bavaria, Hesse (Germany)
- Parent range: Rhön (High Rhön)

Climbing
- Access: Track from the Schornhecke car park (no private vehicles)

The Heidelstein, between Bischofsheim an der Rhön in the Bavarian county of Rhön-Grabfeld and Wüstensachsen in the Hessian county of Fulda, is a mountain, 925.7 m above sea level (NHN) high, on the state border in the mountains of the High Rhön, part of the German Central Upland range of Rhön. Its actual summit is in Bavaria. Sometimes its main peak is also called Schwabenhimmel.

On the Heidelstein are the Heidelstein Transmitter and a memorial of the Rhön Club. On the northwestern slopes is the source of the River Ulster and on the western mountainside is the Rotes Moor Cross Country Skiing Centre.
