= Stirnberg =

Mountain in Bavaria, Germany

Coordinates: 50°29′32″N 10°02′23″E

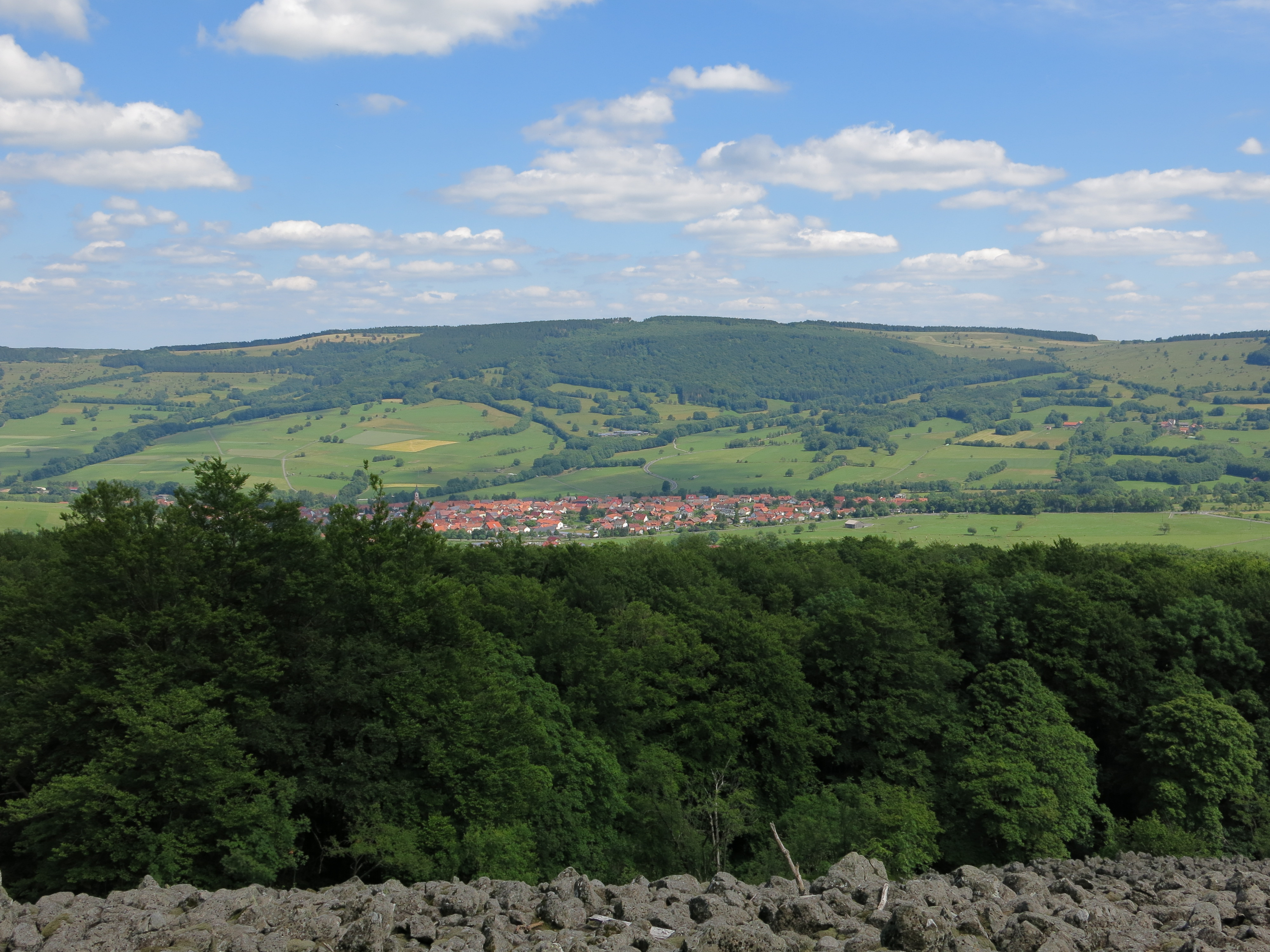

Highest point
- Elevation: 901.9 m (2,959 ft)

Geography
- Location: Bavaria, Germany
- Parent range: Rhön Mountains

Stirnberg is a mountain of Bavaria, Germany.
