= Steinkopf (Wüstensachsen) =

Mountain in Hesse, Germany

Coordinates: 50°28′41″N 10°01′05″E

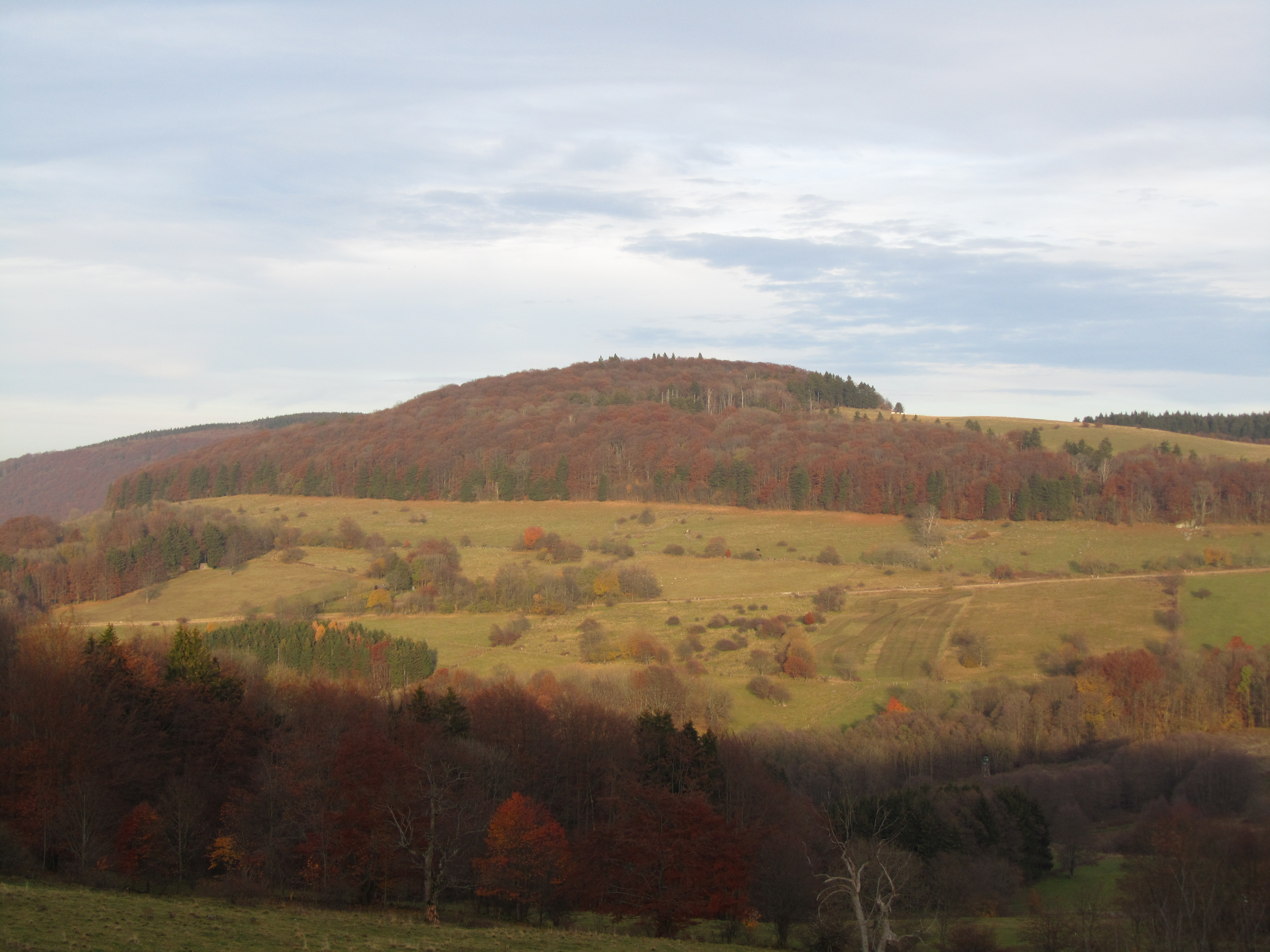
- Steinkopf from the west.

Highest point
- Elevation: 888 m (2,913 ft)

Geography
- Location: Hesse, Germany

Steinkopf is a mountain of Hesse, Germany.
