= Ulster (river) =

River in Germany

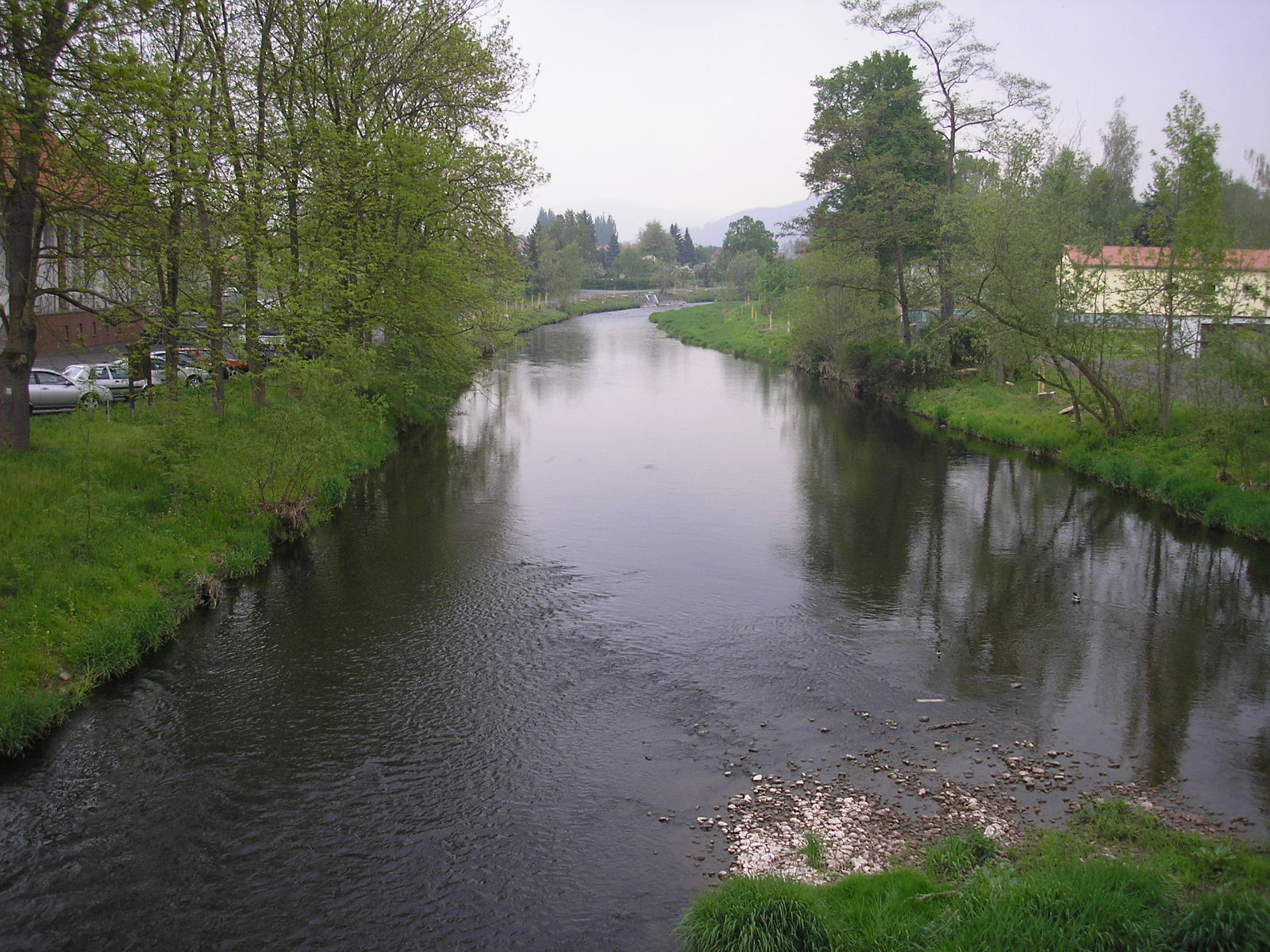

Location
- Country: Germany
- States: Hesse and Thuringia

Physical characteristics
- Source
  - location: Rhön Mountains
  - coordinates: 50°50′32″N 9°59′7″E
- Mouth
  - location: Werra
  - coordinates: 50°50′36″N 9°59′5″E
- Length: 57.3 km (35.6 mi)
- Basin size: 422 km^{2} (163 sq mi)

Basin features
- Progression: Werra→ Weser→ North Sea

The Ulster (German pronunciation: [ˈʊlstɐ]) is a 57-kilometre-long (35 mi) river in Central Germany that flows through the states of Thuringia and Hesse.

The river originates in the Rhön Mountains, near the town of Ehrenberg. It then flows primarily in a northerly direction, through the towns of Hilders, Tann, Geisa, and Unterbreizbach. It flows from the left into the Werra River in Philippsthal.

== See also ==
- List of rivers of Thuringia
- List of rivers of Hesse
