= Poppenhausen, Hesse =

Poppenhausen
- Municipality
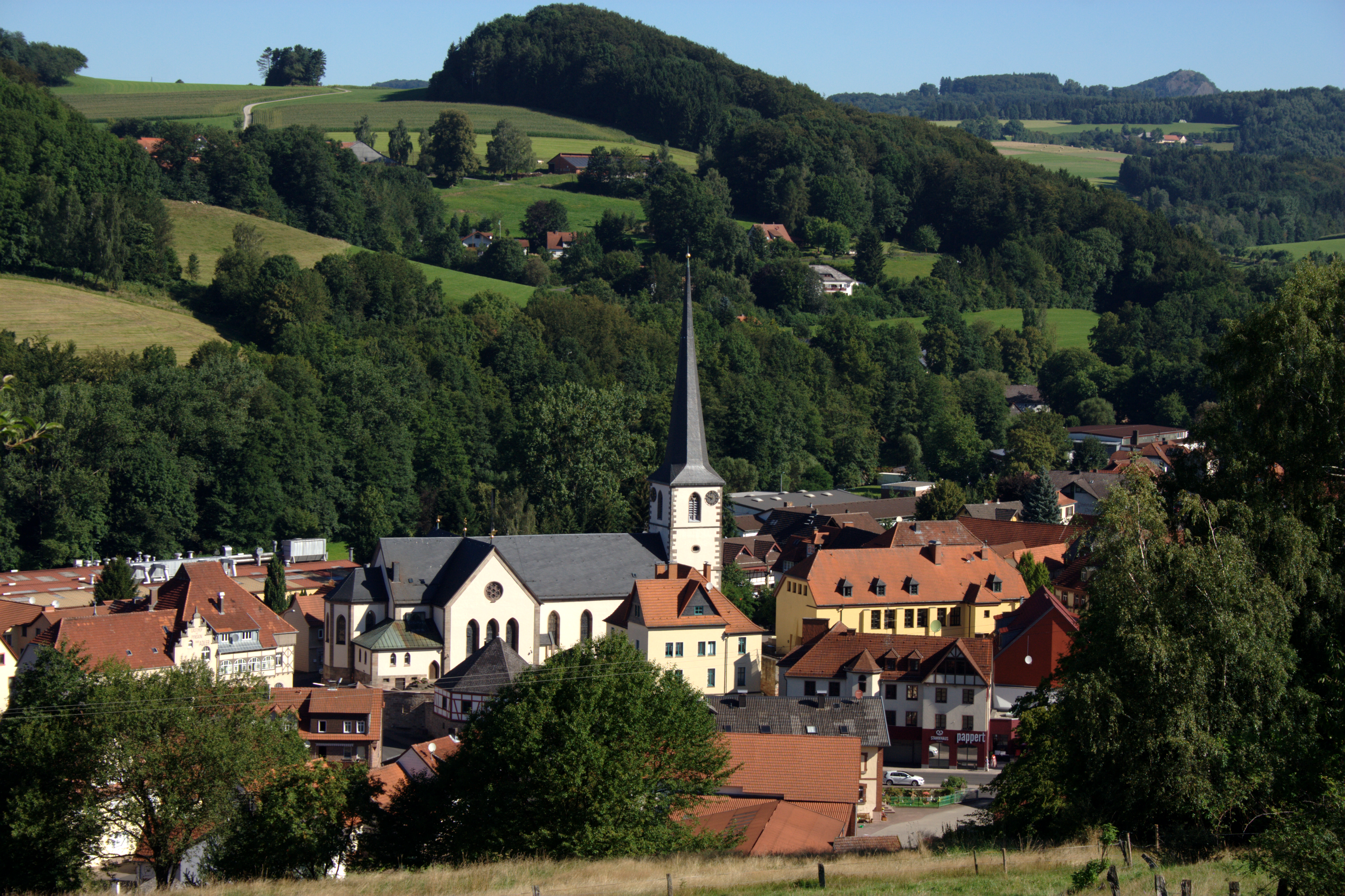
- View of the center of Poppenhausen

- Coat of arms

- Location of Poppenhausen within Fulda district
- Interactive map of Poppenhausen
- Location within Germany Location within Hesse
- Coordinates: 50°29′18″N 09°52′9″E
- Country: Germany
- State: Hesse
- Admin. region: Kassel
- District: Fulda

Government
  - Mayor (2025–31): Alexandra Ballweg (CDU)

Area
  - Total: 40.77 km^{2} (15.74 sq mi)
- Elevation: 524 m (1,719 ft)

Population (2025-12-31)
  - Total: 2,760
  - Density: 67.7/km^{2} (175/sq mi)
- Time zone: UTC+01:00 (CET)
  - Summer (DST): UTC+02:00 (CEST)
- Postal codes: 36163
- Dialling codes: 06658
- Vehicle registration: FD
- Website: www.poppenhausen-wasserkuppe.de

Poppenhausen (official name: Poppenhausen (Wasserkuppe)) is a municipality in the district of Fulda, in Hesse, Germany. It lies at the foot of the Wasserkuppe, the highest point of the Rhön Mountains. The municipality consists of the villages Poppenhausen, Gackenhof, Abtsroda, Rodholz and Steinwand. It is the home of Alexander Schleicher GmbH & Co, the oldest manufacturer of gliders.
