= Oberelsbach =

- Municipality
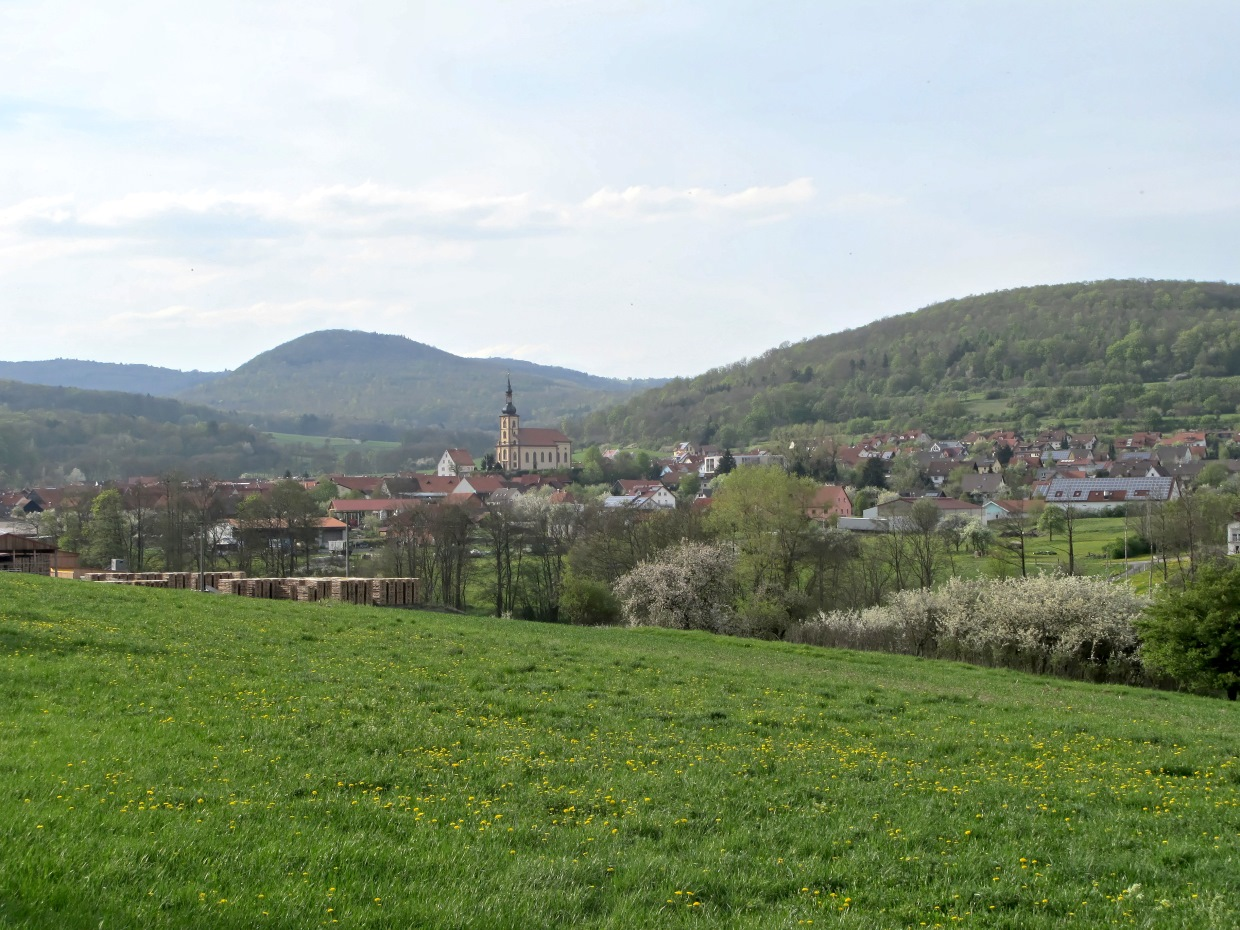
- Oberelsbach seen from the south

- Coat of arms

- Location of Oberelsbach within Rhön-Grabfeld district
- Interactive map of Oberelsbach
- Location within Germany Location within Bavaria
- Coordinates: 50°26′N 10°8′E
- Country: Germany
- State: Bavaria
- Admin. region: Unterfranken
- District: Rhön-Grabfeld

Government
  - Mayor (2022–28): Björn Denner

Area
  - Total: 67.66 km^{2} (26.12 sq mi)
- Elevation: 420 m (1,380 ft)

Population (2025-12-31)
  - Total: 2,634
  - Density: 38.93/km^{2} (100.8/sq mi)
- Time zone: UTC+01:00 (CET)
  - Summer (DST): UTC+02:00 (CEST)
- Postal codes: 97656
- Dialling codes: 09774
- Vehicle registration: NES
- Website: www.rhoen-saale.net

Oberelsbach is a municipality in the district of Rhön-Grabfeld in Bavaria in Germany.
