= Rhön Club =

Rhön Club (Rhönklub e.V.)
Club dates
Founded	1876
Address/ Contact	Peterstor 7; 36037 Fulda
President	vacant
Members	25,000 (2010)
Internet
Home page	www.rhoenklub.de

The Rhön Club (German: Rhönklub) is an inter-state local history and rambling club in Bavaria, Hesse and Thuringia, with around 25,000 members in 88 branches and is one of the larger German rambling clubs in the Association of German Alpine and Rambling Clubs (Verband Deutscher Gebirgs- und Wandervereine).

== Aims ==
The club was founded on 6 August 1876 in Gersfeld with the aim of opening up the Rhön Mountains as a hiking and rambling area. Its aim today is the conservation of the valuable natural and cultural countryside of the Rhön from a number of ecological viewpoints, especially:

- the preservation of rare plants
- the care of native animals and the general protection of wildlife
- the conservation of valuable cultural sites
- the fostering of local customs
- the preservation of local folk songs
- the knowledgeable speaking of the dialect
- the care of old cultural objects

== Presidents ==
From	To	Name
1876	1904	Justus Schneider (doctor)
1904	1913	Karl Wegener (architect)
1913	1939	Hugo Pfeiffer (king's counsel)
1939	1961	Oswald Milker
1961	1976	Josef Hans Sauer
1976	1989	Alfons Lühn
1989	2011	Regina Rinke
2011	2013	Ewald Klüber (engineer, 1948–2014)
since 24 June 2013		Vacant

== Literature ==
- Rhönklub (publ.): Schneiders Rhönführer. Offizieller Führer des Rhönklubs. Verlag Parzeller, 2005, Fulda, ISBN 3-79000-365-4, pp. 96 ff.
- Rhönwacht (the Club magazine) (2006, Issue 2, April to Juni)
