= Wasserkuppe =

Mountain in Germany

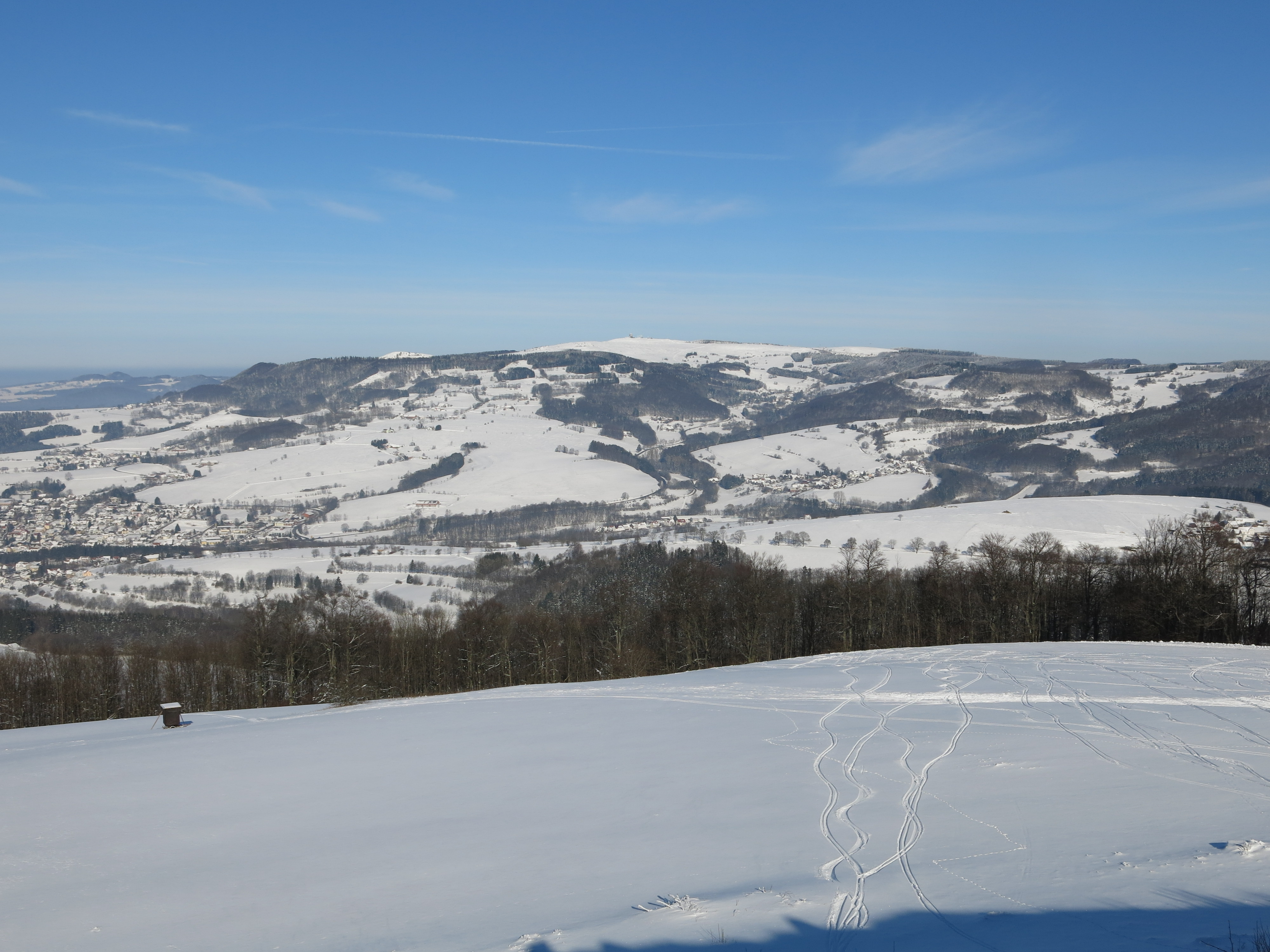

Highest point
- Elevation: 950.2 m above sea level (NN) (3,117 ft)
- Isolation: 59.36 km (36.88 mi) to Großer Beerberg
- Listing: highest mountain of Hesse
- Coordinates: 50°29′53″N 9°56′16″E

Geography
- Location within Hesse Location within Germany
- Location: Landkreis Fulda, Hessen, Germany
- Parent range: Rhön (Hohe Rhön)

Geology
- Mountain type(s): Basalt, Bunter extinct volcano

Climbing
- Easiest route: asphalt road almost to the top

The Wasserkuppe (German pronunciation: [ˈvasɐˌkʊpə];) is the highest mountain in the Rhön range and the tallest elevation in the German state of Hesse, standing at 950 metres (3,120 ft) above sea level. It forms a prominent plateau within the Fulda district and is known as the "cradle of gliding". Great advances in sailplane development took place here during the interwar period, driven by annual contests. To this day, an airfield near the summit continues to be used by gliding clubs and light aircraft pilots.

== Etymology ==
The German name is derived from Wasenkuppe, Asenberg or Weideberg and means Pasture mountain.

== Geography ==
The Wasserkuppe lies in the administrative district Fulda 5.3 kilometres (3.3 mi) north of Gersfeld. Other villages nearby are Poppenhausen (4.7 kilometres (2.9 mi) west - south west) and Wüstensachsen (5 kilometres (3.1 mi) east, part of Ehrenberg, Hesse). It is part of the Rhön Biosphere Reserve.

The Wasserkuppe sources the spring of the river Fulda (the western source of the Weser) and the river Lütter which joins the Fulda after 50 kilometres (31 mi).

The other peaks near the Wasserkuppe are Abtsrodaer Kuppe (north, 905 metres (2,969 ft) NN), Schafstein (east, 831.8 metres (2,729 ft) NN) and Pferdskopf (south west, 874.9 metres (2,870 ft) NN).

=== Climate ===
Wasserkuppe's climate is classified as humid continental (Köppen: Dfb; Trewartha: Dclo) closely bordering on a subarctic climate (Dfc). The average annual temperature in Wasserkuppe is 6.0 °C (42.8 °F). The average annual rainfall is 1,106.1 mm (43.55 in) with December as the wettest month. The temperatures are highest on average in July, at around 14.8 °C (58.6 °F), and lowest in January, at around −2.2 °C (28.0 °F).

The Wasserkuppe weather station has recorded the following extreme values:

- Highest Temperature 33.2 °C (91.8 °F) on 20 July 2022.
- Warmest Minimum 22.5 °C (72.5 °F) on 25 July 2019.
- Coldest Maximum −22.0 °C (−7.6 °F) on 1 February 1956.
- Lowest Temperature −26.3 °C (−15.3 °F) on 1 February 1956.
- Highest Daily Precipitation 95.6 mm (3.76 in) on 25 July 2017.
- Wettest Month 349.5 mm (13.76 in) in August 1924.
- Wettest Year 1,535.7 mm (60.46 in) in 1965.
- Driest Year 661.7 mm (26.05 in) in 1976.
- Earliest Snowfall: 30 September 1954.
- Latest Snowfall: 26 May 2013.
- Longest annual sunshine : 2,173.1 hours in 1959.
- Shortest annual sunshine : 1,304.5 hours in 1998.

Climate data for Wasserkuppe: 920m (1991−2020 normals, extremes 1923–present)
Month	Jan	Feb	Mar	Apr	May	Jun	Jul	Aug	Sep	Oct	Nov	Dec	Year
Record high °C (°F)	12.7 (54.9)	16.6 (61.9)	20.3 (68.5)	26.2 (79.2)	28.5 (83.3)	30.4 (86.7)	33.2 (91.8)	32.7 (90.9)	27.2 (81.0)	23.0 (73.4)	19.9 (67.8)	12.8 (55.0)	33.2 (91.8)
Mean maximum °C (°F)	7.0 (44.6)	8.7 (47.7)	13.2 (55.8)	19.4 (66.9)	23.1 (73.6)	26.1 (79.0)	27.6 (81.7)	27.3 (81.1)	22.3 (72.1)	17.7 (63.9)	12.6 (54.7)	8.1 (46.6)	29.1 (84.4)
Mean daily maximum °C (°F)	0.0 (32.0)	0.8 (33.4)	4.4 (39.9)	10.0 (50.0)	14.1 (57.4)	17.3 (63.1)	19.4 (66.9)	19.3 (66.7)	14.5 (58.1)	9.5 (49.1)	4.3 (39.7)	1.1 (34.0)	9.6 (49.3)
Daily mean °C (°F)	−2.2 (28.0)	−1.9 (28.6)	1.1 (34.0)	5.6 (42.1)	9.6 (49.3)	12.8 (55.0)	14.8 (58.6)	14.7 (58.5)	10.6 (51.1)	6.2 (43.2)	1.9 (35.4)	−1.1 (30.0)	6.0 (42.8)
Mean daily minimum °C (°F)	−4.3 (24.3)	−4.1 (24.6)	−1.7 (28.9)	2.0 (35.6)	5.8 (42.4)	8.9 (48.0)	11.1 (52.0)	11.1 (52.0)	7.6 (45.7)	3.8 (38.8)	−0.3 (31.5)	−3.2 (26.2)	3.1 (37.6)
Mean minimum °C (°F)	−12.2 (10.0)	−11.3 (11.7)	−7.9 (17.8)	−4.8 (23.4)	−0.5 (31.1)	3.1 (37.6)	6.1 (43.0)	5.8 (42.4)	2.8 (37.0)	−2.1 (28.2)	−6.5 (20.3)	−10.2 (13.6)	−14.6 (5.7)
Record low °C (°F)	−23.9 (−11.0)	−26.3 (−15.3)	−17.1 (1.2)	−10.7 (12.7)	−4.8 (23.4)	−2.2 (28.0)	1.9 (35.4)	1.8 (35.2)	−1.6 (29.1)	−8.5 (16.7)	−13.1 (8.4)	−20.7 (−5.3)	−26.3 (−15.3)
Average precipitation mm (inches)	98.9 (3.89)	79.5 (3.13)	82.1 (3.23)	60.7 (2.39)	99.5 (3.92)	84.4 (3.32)	123.6 (4.87)	92.4 (3.64)	93.1 (3.67)	95.4 (3.76)	90.9 (3.58)	105.6 (4.16)	1,106.1 (43.55)
Average extreme snow depth cm (inches)	36.7 (14.4)	43.1 (17.0)	30.5 (12.0)	9.5 (3.7)	0.8 (0.3)	0 (0)	0 (0)	0 (0)	0 (0)	1.7 (0.7)	14.3 (5.6)	29.4 (11.6)	58.6 (23.1)
Average precipitation days (≥ 1.0 mm)	20.4	18.0	17.9	14.5	16.1	15.4	16.5	15.0	14.5	17.0	19.6	21.4	206.2
Average snowy days (≥ 1 cm)	24.1	22.6	16.5	4.6	0.2	0.0	0.0	0.0	0.0	1.3	8.8	20.9	99.4
Average relative humidity (%)	92.0	88.6	84.6	75.0	76.2	77.3	76.5	76.7	83.8	89.5	92.6	92.4	83.8
Mean monthly sunshine hours	55.6	78.1	119.6	173.6	198.5	204.0	212.1	204.5	147.9	104.0	56.7	45.3	1,600
Source 1: NOAA
Source 2: DWD (extremes)

== Aeronautical development ==
Students from the Darmstadt University of Technology, then known as Technische Hochschule Darmstadt, began flying gliders from the Wasserkuppe as early as 1911, but interest in gliding in Germany increased greatly after 1918 when the Treaty of Versailles restricted the production or use of powered aircraft in the nation. From 1920 onwards, annual gliding competitions were held, leading to records being set and broken for height, distance and duration of unpowered flight. In 1922 Arthur Martens became the first glider pilot to use an updraft rising along a mountain slope to stay aloft for a lengthy period. He then founded the world's first glider pilot school at the Wasserkuppe.

The first competition was organised by Oskar Ursinus, who also built the first clubhouse on the Wasserkuppe in 1924 to replace the shipping containers that enthusiasts were using as accommodation up to that point. By 1930, the competition had become an international event, drawing pilots from all over Europe and even the United States.

Also in 1924 'Rhönvater' (Rhön father) Oskar Ursinus convinced the then secretary of air transport for the ministry of transportation Ernst Brandenburg to turn the new gliding club into a state funded research organization. This started the Rhön-Rossitten Gesellschaft and as a result, the Wasserkuppe now had a gliding school, workshops for building gliders and a funded research facility. Alexander Lippisch was appointed as the managing director of the new society.

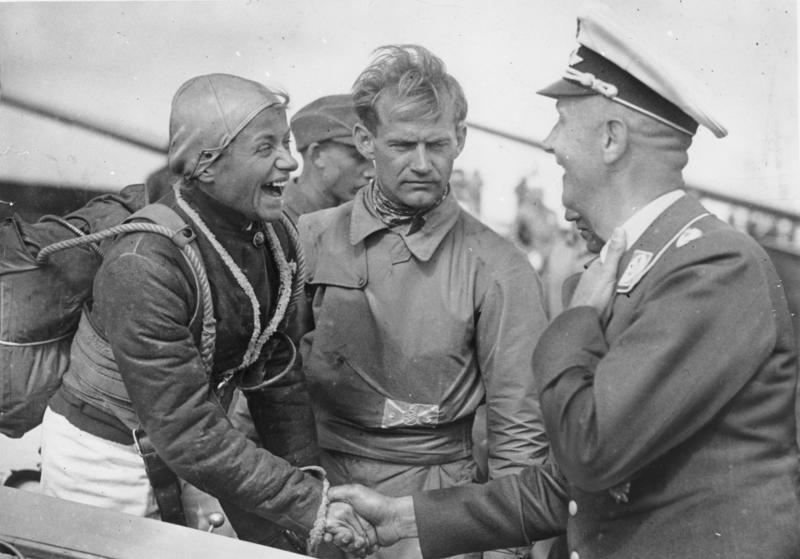
German aviator Hanna Reitsch at the Wasserkuppe

Virtually every German aeronautical engineer and test pilot of note during the 1920s and 1930s spent time building, testing, and flying aircraft at the Wasserkuppe, including the Günter brothers, Wolf Hirth, the Horten brothers, Robert Kronfeld, Hans Jacobs, Heini Dittmar, Alexander Lippisch, Gottlob Espenlaub, Edmund Schneider, Willy Messerschmitt, Hanna Reitsch, Peter Riedel, and Alexander Schleicher. Beverley Shenstone, who was later a key part of the design team for the Spitfire, flew gliders at Wasserkuppe in 1930. This period saw great advances in new technologies such as flying wings and rocket-powered flights.

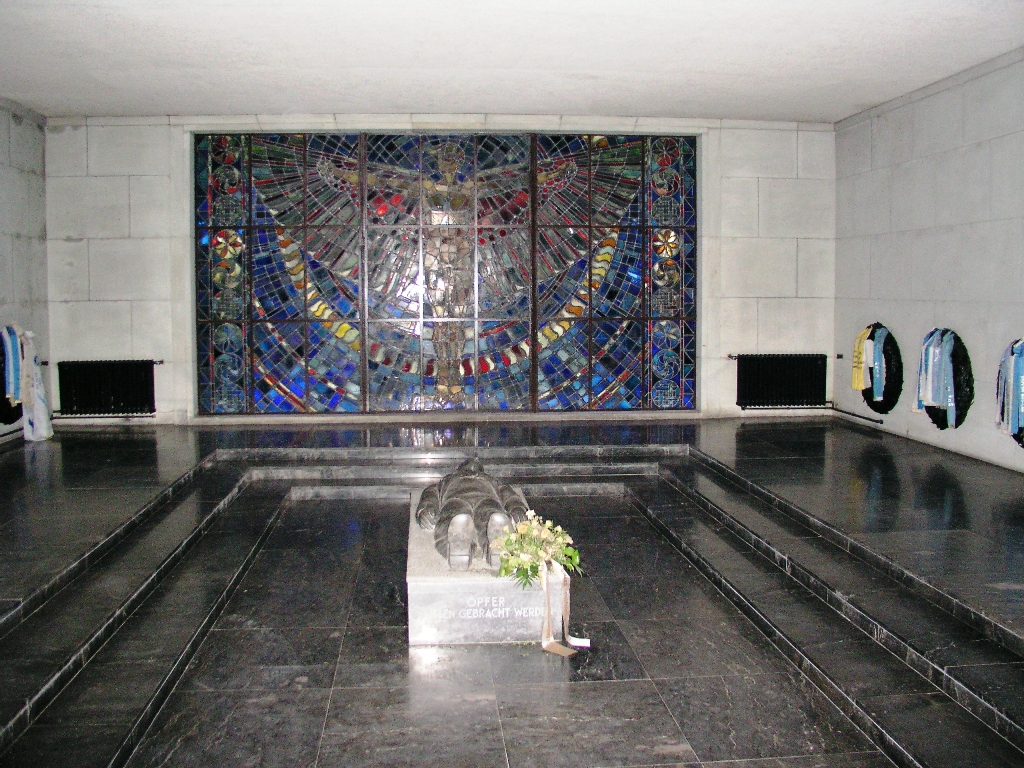
The "Ehrenhalle" in the Lilienthal Haus on the Wasserkuppe

In the 1930s the "Ehrenhalle" (Hall of Honor) was constructed in the Lilienthal Haus, with heavy bronze doors opening into a large hall with a stained glass window. The centerpiece is a larger-than-life bronze figure of Otto Lilienthal lying on an (empty) tomb. It is a memorial to all pilots who have died in aviation accidents. The inscription on the memorial is Lilienthal's famous last words: "Opfer müssen gebracht werden" roughly meaning: "Sacrifices must be made."

In Nazi Germany, gliding activities became largely controlled by the state, and for Hitler Youth pilots and their instructors, proficiency in gliding was viewed as the first step towards the Luftwaffe. Sailplane research was also nationalised under the Deutsche Forschungsanstalt für Segelflug (DFS – German Research Institute for Sailplane Flight).

Following World War II, a US Air Force base, radar station, and surveillance station were established there but when restrictions on German aviation were lifted in 1951, gliding soon returned to the Wasserkuppe where it has remained popular since. Beginning in the 1970s, the newer sport of hang gliding has also found a home there. Following the reunification of Germany and demise of the Soviet Union, the surveillance and radar installations were removed in the 1990s.

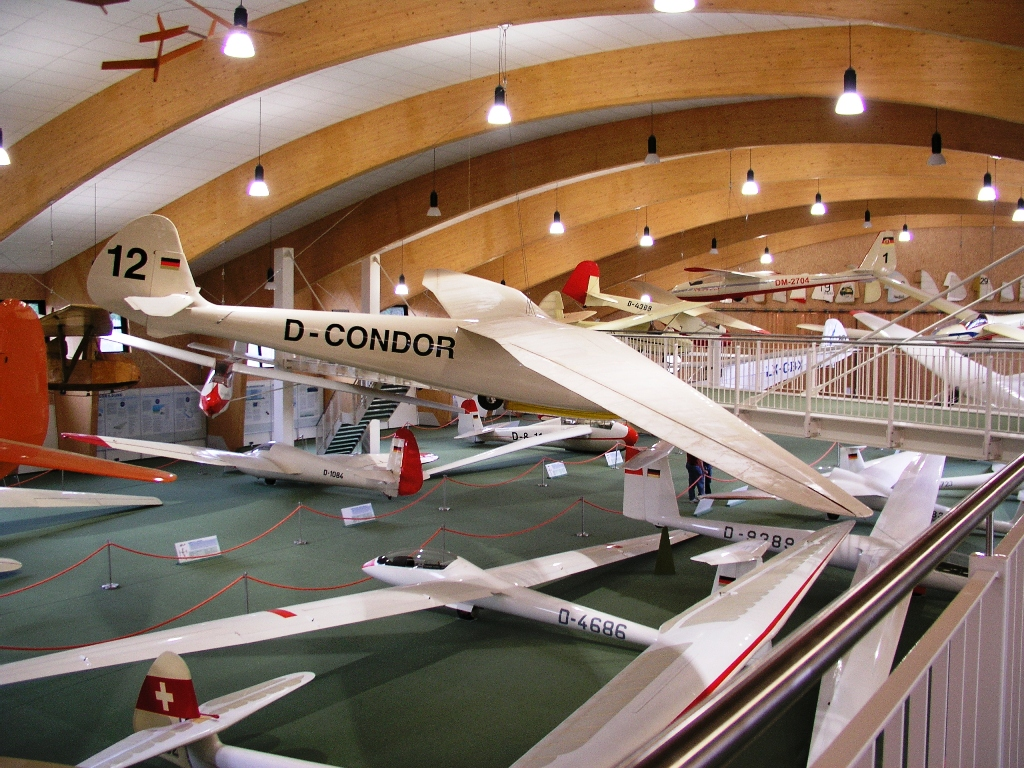
The new exhibit hall in the Deutsches Segelflugmuseum (German Sailplane Museum)

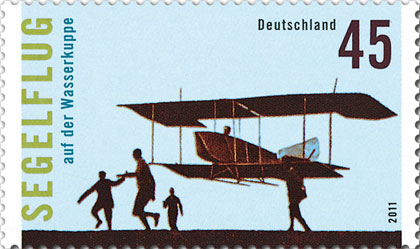
Commemorative Stamp

In 1970, to commemorate the 50th anniversary of the first competition, the Deutsches Segelflugmuseum (German Sailplane Museum) was opened on the plateau, with Neil Armstrong a guest of honour at the ceremony. The museum gained a new building in 1987. The Wasserkuppe is also the home of the Oldtimer Segelflugclub (OSC – Oldtimer Gliding Club), dedicated (as its name suggests) to flying vintage sailplanes.

Next to the long tradition of sailplanes the Wasserkuppe has become a sports and weekend centre offering a wide selection of activities. Paragliding as well as snowkiting is offered. In winter the area is used by skiers and snowboarders.

== See also ==
- RRG Fafnir
- RRG Professor
- RRG Urubu Obs
- Rhön-Rossitten Gesellschaft
- Stratobowl, a similar bowl-shaped natural landform in the United States, associated with historic aviation activity
