= Ehrenberg, Hesse =

Ehrenberg
- Municipality
- Coat of arms

- Location of Ehrenberg within Fulda district
- Interactive map of Ehrenberg
- Location within Germany Location within Hesse
- Coordinates: 50°31′34″N 10°0′51″E
- Country: Germany
- State: Hesse
- Admin. region: Kassel
- District: Fulda

Government
  - Mayor (2019–25): Peter Kirchner (Ind.)

Area
  - Total: 40.84 km^{2} (15.77 sq mi)
- Elevation: 580 m (1,900 ft)

Population (2025-12-31)
  - Total: 2,500
  - Density: 61/km^{2} (160/sq mi)
- Time zone: UTC+01:00 (CET)
  - Summer (DST): UTC+02:00 (CEST)
- Postal codes: 36115
- Dialling codes: 06683; 06681 (Thaiden, Reulbach)
- Vehicle registration: FD
- Website: www.gemeinde-ehrenberg.de

Ehrenberg (German pronunciation: [ˈeːʁənbɛʁk]) is a municipality in the district of Fulda, in Hesse, Germany.

== Geography ==
The municipality is located in the centre of the wildlife park "Hessische Rhön" in a level of 450 up to 900 meters and approx. 30 km from Fulda. Most of its districts are situated in the valley of the river Ulster and are crossed by the interstate road B278. Only Reulbach is in another valley.

=== Neighbouring municipalities ===
Ehrenberg touches the municipalities Hilders (rural district Fulda) in the north, Birx (Thuringia), the town Fladungen (Bavaria), the municipality Hausen (also Bavaria) and the town Oberelsbach (also Bavaria) the east, the town Gersfeld (district Fulda) in the south and the municipality Poppenhausen (district Fulda) in the west.

== Districts ==
=== Melperts ===
- 180 inhabitants (2004)
- principal: Gertrud Faulstich
- average level: 540 m

The smallest village of the municipality is characterized by prevailing agriculture. In the centre of the village there is a bakehouse where the annual Melpertser Bakehousefestival is taking place. In Melperts there is a pottery.

=== Reulbach ===
- 450 inhabitants (2004)
- principal: Roland Hohmann
- average level: 570 m

=== Seiferts ===
- 650 inhabitants (2004)
- principal: Peter Wehner
- average level: 530 m

=== Thaiden ===
- 340 inhabitants (2004)
- principal: Martin Barthelmes
- average level: 500 m

=== Wüstensachsen ===
- 1380 inhabitants (2004)
- principal: Thomas Keidel
- average level: 580 m
