= Hilders =

- Municipality
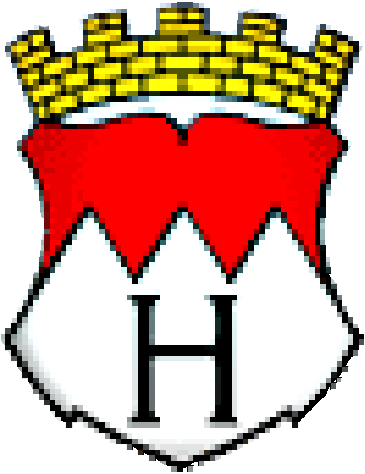
- Coat of arms

- Location of Hilders within Fulda district
- Interactive map of Hilders
- Location within Germany Location within Hesse
- Coordinates: 50°34′N 10°00′E
- Country: Germany
- State: Hesse
- Admin. region: Kassel
- District: Fulda

Government
  - Mayor (2020–26): Ronny Günkel

Area
  - Total: 70.37 km^{2} (27.17 sq mi)
- Elevation: 518 m (1,699 ft)

Population (2025-12-31)
  - Total: 4,663
  - Density: 66.26/km^{2} (171.6/sq mi)
- Time zone: UTC+01:00 (CET)
  - Summer (DST): UTC+02:00 (CEST)
- Postal codes: 36115
- Dialling codes: 06681
- Vehicle registration: FD
- Website: www.hilders.de

Hilders (German pronunciation: [ˈhɪldɐs]) is a municipality in the district of Fulda, in Hesse, Germany. To the north rises the mountain of Auersberg.
