= Dammersfeld Ridge =

Mountain chain in Germany

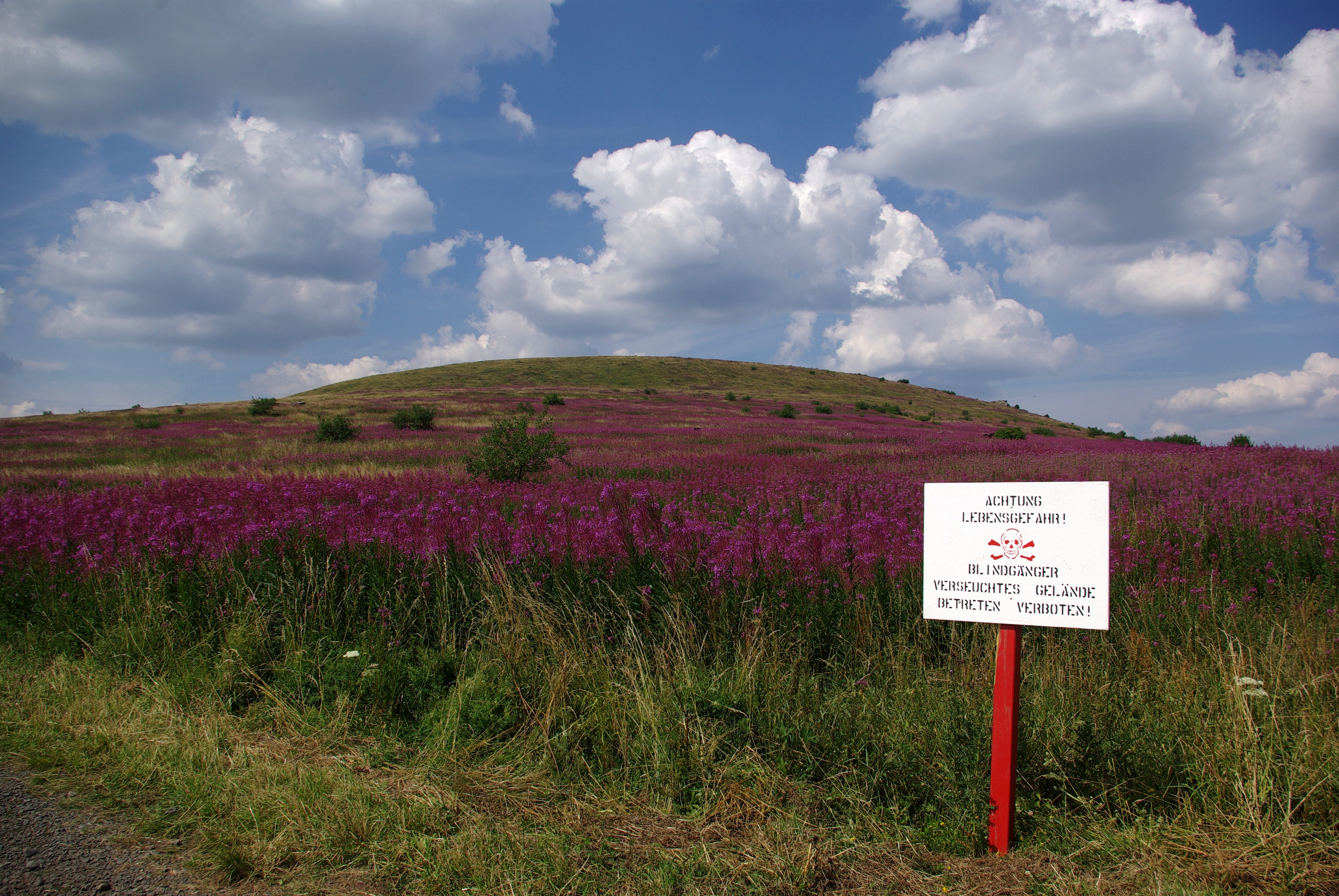
- The Dammersfeldkuppe

Highest point
- Peak: Dammersfeldkuppe
- Elevation: 927.9 m above NHN

Geography
- Location within Bavaria Location within Hesse
- State(s): Counties of Bad Kissingen and Rhön-Grabfeld, Bavaria, and county of Fulda, Hesse, Germany
- Range coordinates: 50°23′49″N 9°51′44″E
- Parent range: Southern High Rhön, High Rhön, Rhön

The Dammersfeld Ridge (German: Dammersfeldrücken) is a low mountain chain in the High Rhön in Germany, which begins on a line from Bischofsheim to Gersfeld and runs in a southwesterly direction to Riedenberg – Werberg – Maria Ehrenberg. The majority of this area today is a military out-of-bounds area, the Wildflecken Training Area. Its highest point is the Dammersfeldkuppe, the second-highest mountain in the Rhön. The Bavarian-Hessian state border runs along the crest of the mountain chain.

== Natural regions ==
The Dammersfeld Ridge was first defined in 1968 as a natural region as part of the natural regional classification of Germany at a map scale of 1:200,000 (Sheet 140 Schweinfurt), and it is grouped as follows:

- (part of no. 35 East Hesse Highlands)
  - (part of no. 354 High Rhön)
    - (part of no. 354.0 Southern High Rhön)
      - 354.00 Dammersfeld Ridge

== Mountains ==
- Dammersfeldkuppe (927.9 m (3,044 ft); northwest of Wildflecken, in the southwest of the area)
  - Dreifeldskuppe (832 m (2,730 ft), west-northwest summit)
  - Ottersteine (821 m (2,694 ft), northern summit)
    - Bremerkopf 797 m (2,615 ft)
  - Dalherdakuppe (801 m (2,628 ft), north-northwestern summit)
- Eierhauckberg (910 m (2,990 ft))
  - Beilstein (865 m (2,838 ft); west-southwestern summit)
- Hohe Hölle (894 m (2,933 ft))
  - Himmeldunkberg (888 m (2,913 ft), southern summit)
  - Teufelsberg (844 m (2,769 ft), southwestern summit)
- Mittelberg (880 m (2,890 ft); almost a northeastern spur of the Eierhauckberg)
  - Schachen (857 m (2,812 ft); eastern summit)
  - Rommerser Berg (850 m (2,790 ft); northern summit)
  - Zornberg (838 m (2,749 ft), southern summit)
- Rückberg (870 m (2,850 ft), almost a southern spur of the Dammersfeldkuppe)
- Reesberg (851 m (2,792 ft))
- Simmelsberg (843 m (2,766 ft), with the Simmelsberg winter sports area)
- Großer Auersberg (809 m (2,654 ft))
- Kleiner Auersberg (808 m (2,651 ft))
- Ehrenberg 674 m (2,211 ft)
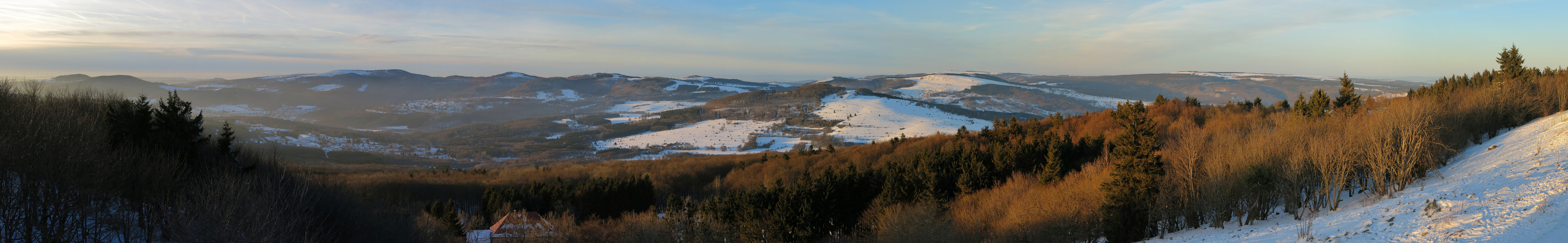
View from the Kreuzberg northward to the Dammersfeld Ridge with Kleiner- and Großer Auersberg, Dammersfeldkuppe, Eierhauckberg and Himmeldunkberg.
