= Auersberg (disambiguation) =

Auersberg may refer to:

- Auersberg, a mountain in the Saxon Ore Mountains near Wildenthal, Germany
- Two mountains in the Bavarian Rhön, the Großer Auersberg and Kleiner Auersberg, in the Wildflecken Training Area, Germany
- Auersberg (Hilders), a mountain in the Hessian Rhön north of Hilders, Germany
- Auersberg, a German cargo ship of the Type RO 15
