= Kleiner Auersberg =

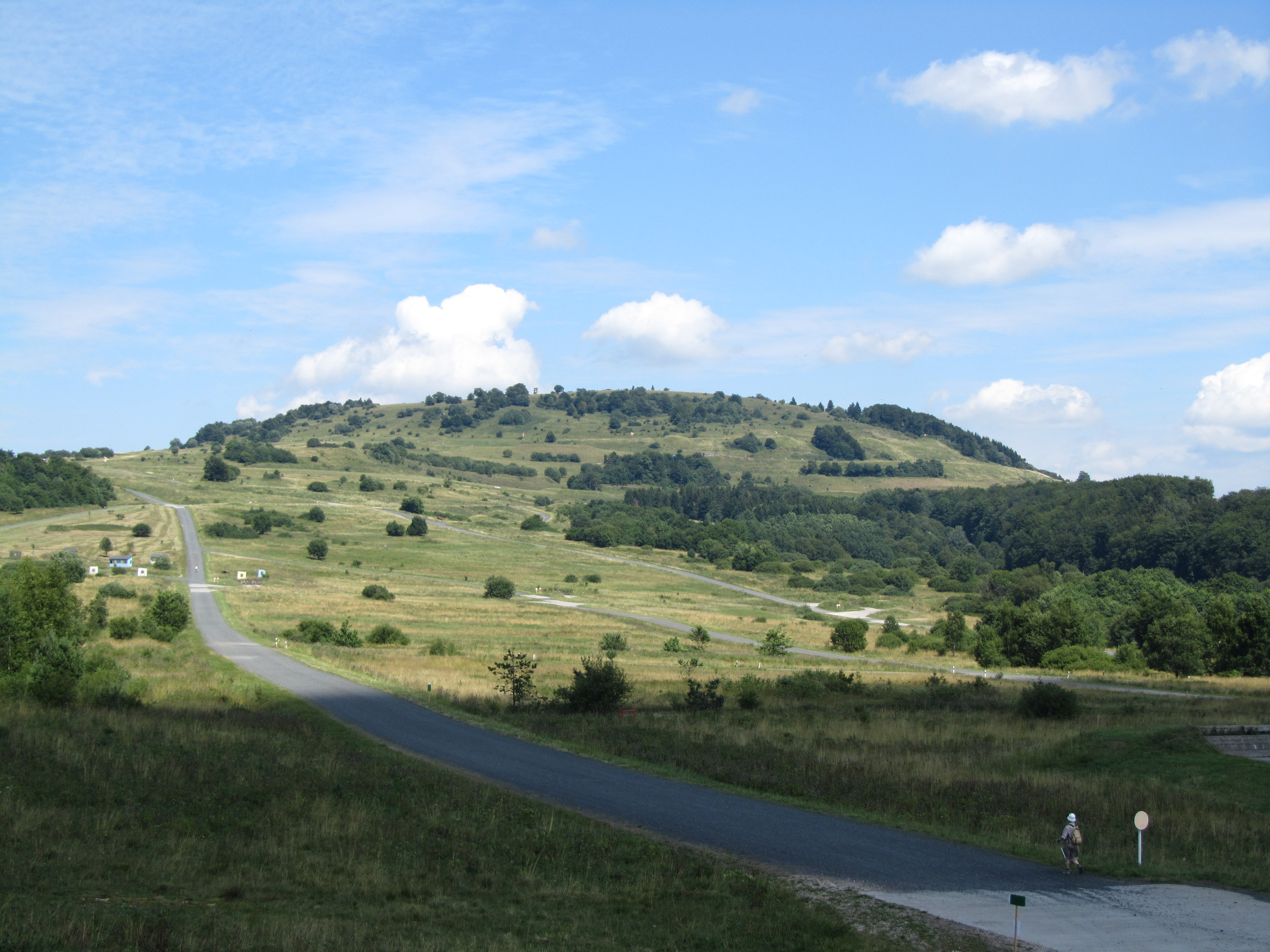
- The Kleiner Auersberg from the south-southwest

Highest point
- Elevation: 808 m above sea level (NN) (2,651 ft)
- Coordinates: 50°21′38″N 9°50′29″E

Geography
- Location within Bavaria
- Location: Bad Kissingen, Bavaria, Germany (Military out-of-bounds area)
- Parent range: Rhön

The Kleiner Auersberg is a mountain, 808 m above sea level (NN), in the Bavarian part of the Rhön mountains. It is situated five kilometres southwest of the centre of Wildflecken in the county of Bad Kissingen on the watershed between the Sinn and Kleiner Sinn.

Partially wooded, the summit of the Kleiner Auersberg offers unobstructed views. Under favorable weather conditions, visibility extends to the Kreuzberg to the east, Dreistelzberg and the Spessart to the southwest, and the Vogelsberg to the northwest. On exceptionally clear days, the Taunus and the skyscrapers of Frankfurt am Main are visible.

The Kleiner Auersberg lies within the Wildflecken Training Area, established in 1938. The entire terrain is a military out-of-bounds area. The only opportunity for civilians to climb the Kleiner Auersberg is on the two Volkswandertage ("people's walking days"), which take place annually on a summer weekend. Due to the good views, usually one of the prescribed routes leads to the summit. A good two kilometres east-northeast rises the slightly higher and densely wooded Großer Auersberg. Neither should be confused with the Auersberg near Hilders in the Hessian part of the Rhön.

== See also ==
- List of mountains and hills of the Rhön
