= Kreuzberg ski area =

Ski area in Rhön region

50°23′12.74″N 9°59′36.57″E

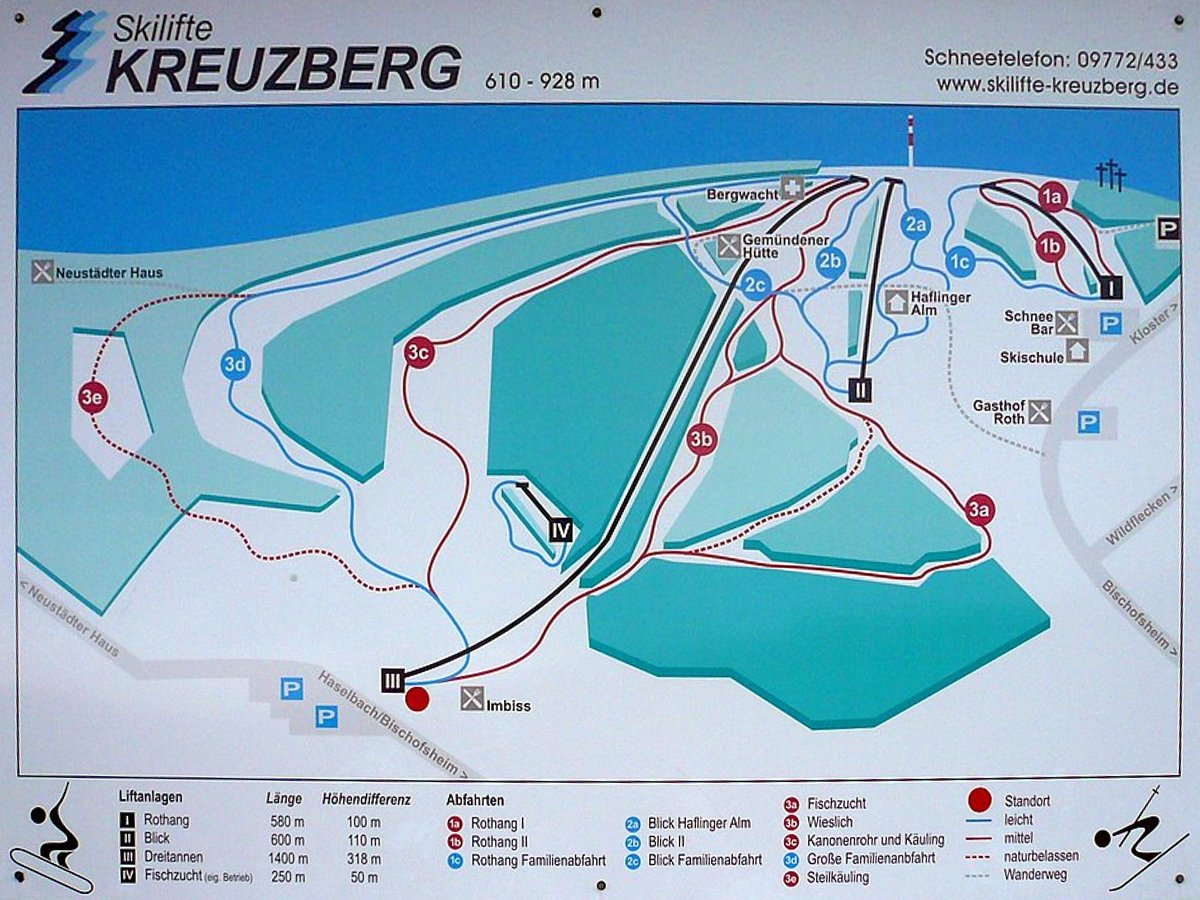
Ski area map from Kreuzberg

The Kreuzberg Ski Area is located on the northern side of the Kreuzberg mountain (928 m) in the Bavarian part of the Rhön region, near Bischofsheim. It ranges in altitude from approximately 600 to 900 meters above sea level. The ski area features four ski lifts ranging in length from 250 to 1408 meters, providing access to eleven slopes of varying difficulty levels. The slopes are about 15 kilometers in length, with lengths varying from 250 to 3000 meters. Due to the length and steepness of the slopes, it is the largest ski area and one of the most challenging in the Rhön region. The two upper ski lifts, Rothanglift, and Blicklift are known for their snow reliability due to their higher altitude and northern location. The Dreitannenlift is the longest ski lift in the Rhön region and the longest drag lift with the greatest elevation difference in Germany outside of the Alps.

Next to the downhill slopes, there is a ski jumping facility called Mattenschanzen. It features three ski jumps that can be used in both summer and winter, along with several cross-country ski trails and winter hiking trails.

== Location ==
The Kreuzberg ski area lies in the Bavarian Rhön Nature Park and the Rhön Biosphere Reserve, both of which are part of the Lower Franconia administrative district. The ski area is subject to nature conservation regulations that are not always applicable in the Hessian ski areas of the Rhön. The town of Bischofsheim in the Rhön is to the north-northeast of the ski slope, and Sandberg in the Rhön-Grabfeld district is to the southeast. To the west is the market town of Wildflecken, in the Bad Kissingen district. The northern slope of the Kreuzberg, which is mostly occupied by the ski area, has a steep incline, and drops down to the upper course of the Brend, a tributary of the Franconian Saale River, at an elevation of approximately 400 meters above sea level. Over a horizontal distance of about three kilometers, a vertical drop of over 500 meters is covered.

== Description ==
=== Ski lifts ===
50 years of Kreuzberg ski lifts

The ski area offers four drag lifts: Blicklift, Rothanglift, Dreitannenlift, and Fischzuchtlift. There are nearby dining options at the Drei-Tannen-Alm and the Gemündener Hütte. The lift area includes the restaurant at Kreuzberg Monastery, which serves locally brewed beer.

Three of the ski lifts, Dreitannenlift, Rothanglift, and Blicklift, operate under the name Skilifte Kreuzberg. The lifts, owned by the Willert family and operated by Thomas Fuß from Haselbach, are open every day while there is sufficient snow. These lifts end at a similar elevation and near each other, allowing skiers to switch from one lift to another and gradually access all the slopes from the same starting point. The fourth ski lift, Fischzuchtlift, operates independently and is open on weekends and during the Christmas holidays, depending on snow conditions. The lift is leased by the Enders family.

==== Blicklift ====
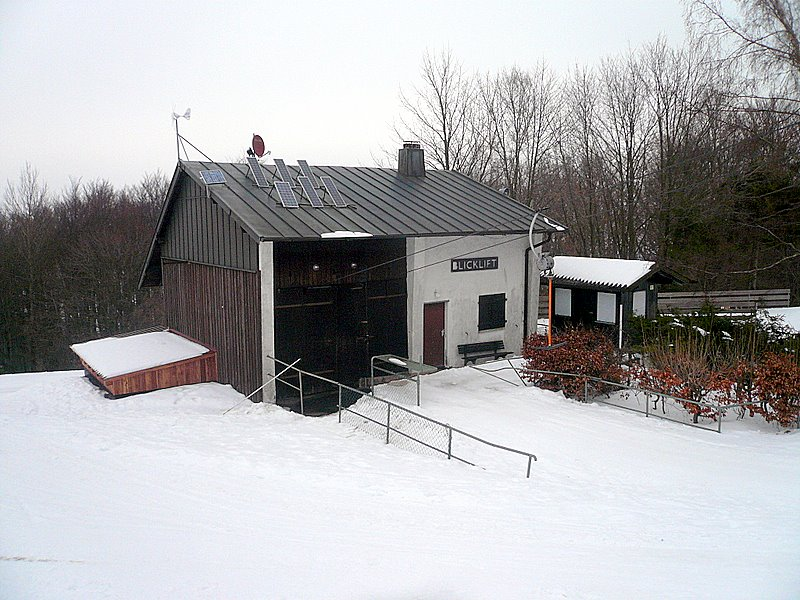

The Blicklift, a Doppelmayr model built in 1958, is the oldest drag lift in the Rhön region and northern Bavaria. It is 600 meters long and features four portal supports – two horizontal vertical profiles connected at the top to guide the rope. With a height difference of 110 meters (780 to 890 meters above sea level), (Note: According to other sources, 540 meters long with a height difference of 114 meters.) the lift is located on the northern slope of the Kreuzberg and serves three slopes ranging from 620 to 940 meters in length, with easy to moderate difficulty levels. The lift takes skiers to the summit of Bischofsheimer Blick. It is powered by a diesel engine located at the bottom station. The elevator makes use of double long-bar plastic hangers with long poles with handles for two people each.

Departures

| Name | Length | Difficulty |
|---|---|---|
| View of the Haflinger Alm (Blick Haflinger Alm) | 620 meters | middle |
| Look II (Blick II) | 630 meters | middle |
| View of the family run (Blick Familienabfahrt) | 940 meters | light |

==== Rothanglift ====
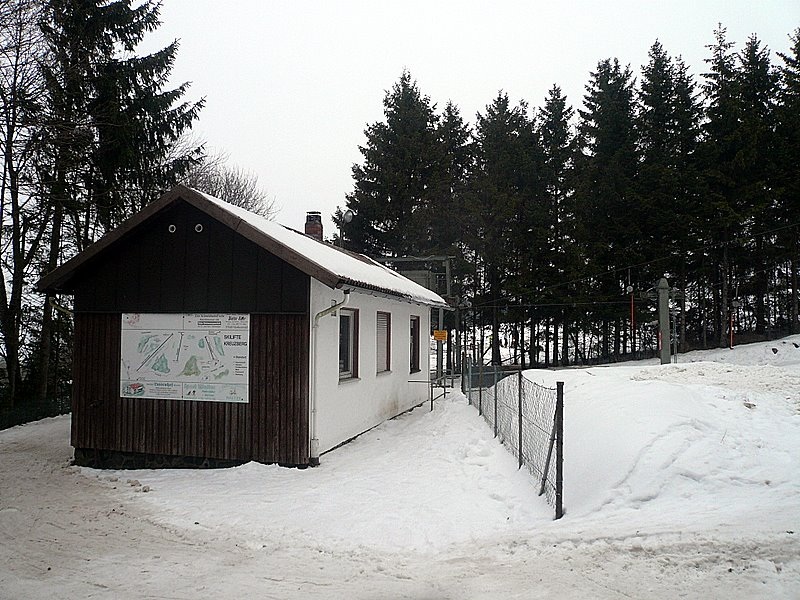

The Rothanglift, a Doppelmayr model built in 1963, covers a total length of 580 meters and features six portal supports, allowing it to surmount a height difference of 100 meters (approximately 775 to 875 meters above sea level). (Note: According to other sources, 470 meters long with a height difference of 103 meters.) The lift is located on the northwest slope of the Kreuzberg and serves three slopes ranging from 580 to 890 meters in length, with easy to moderate difficulty levels. A diesel engine positioned at the bottom station powers it. The lift carries passengers by employing two long-bar plastic hangers.

Departures

| Name | Länge | Schwierigkeit |
|---|---|---|
| Rothang I | 580 meters | middle |
| Rothang II | 580 meters | middle |
| Rothang family run (Rothang Familienabfahrt) | 890 meters | light |

==== Dreitannenlift ====
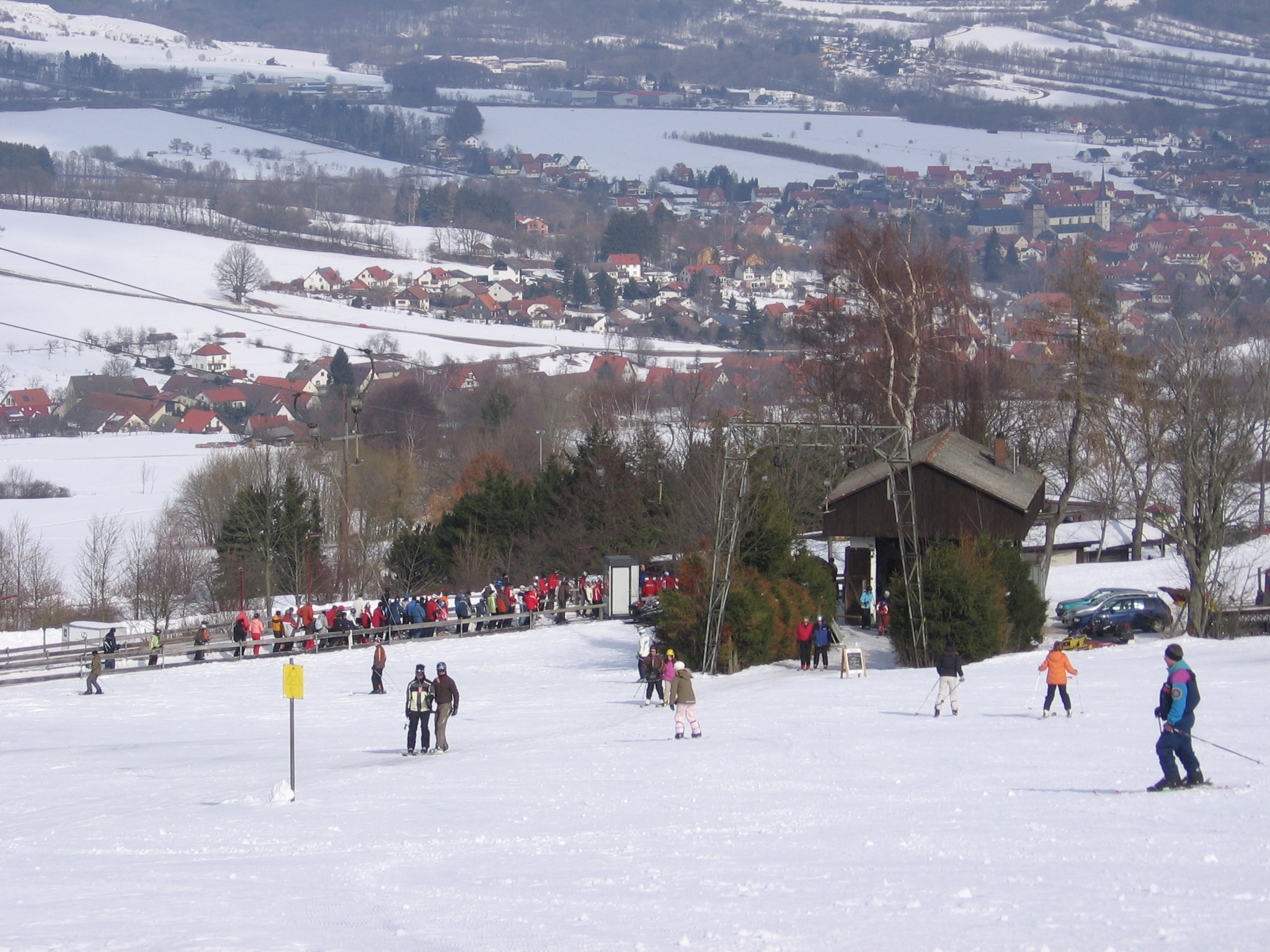
Dreitannenlift

The Dreitannenlift, a Doplmayr model built in 1964, is the longest ski lift in the region, covering a total length of 1408 meters. It spans across 13 portal supports and features the greatest height difference in the central German area, at 318 meters (from 575 to 890 meters above sea level). The lift is located on the northeast slope of the Kreuzberg and serves four slopes varying in difficulty from simple to tough, with lengths ranging from 1460 to 3000 meters. According to the German Ski Association (DSV), these slopes have sections with over 40 percent inclines both longitudinally and laterally. They are the longest and most challenging slopes in the Rhön region. The lift is similarly powered by a diesel engine located at the bottom station. For passenger transportation, the lift staff provides wooden double short-bar hangers to the users.

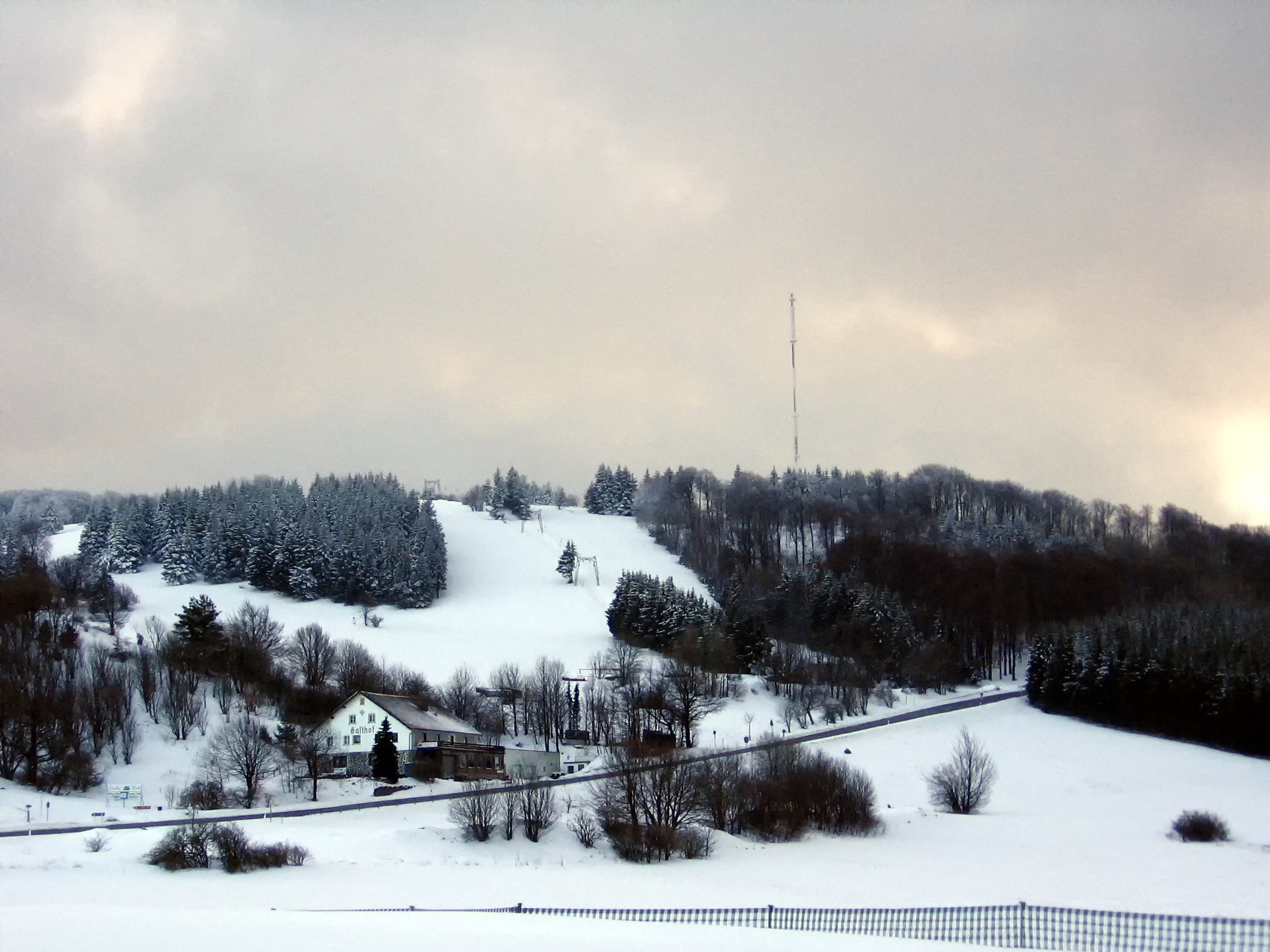
Rothang lift with descents and Gasthof Roth

Departures

| Fish farming ( Fischzucht) | 1700 meters | medium to heavy |
| Wise (Wieslich) | 1460 meters | difficult |
| Barrel and Käuling (Kanonenrohr und Käuling) | 1800 meters | middle |
| Great family run (Große Familienabfahrt) | 2600 meters | light |
| Steep chewing (Steilkäuling) | 3000 meters | medium to heavy |

==== Fischzuchtlift ====
The Fischzuchtlift put up in 1970, spans 250 meters and overcomes a 50-meter height difference (from 590 to 640 meters above sea level). The bottom station of the lift is placed above the second portal support of the Dreitannenlift. The passenger transportation is done without portal supports, using a lower rope guidance system where the rope runs at an adult’s hip height with seat belts attached. The lift operates independently from Skilifte Kreuzberg. The associated ski slope runs through the lower section of the Kanonenrohr slope.

=== Ski-jumping hills ===
The Kreuzbergschanzen ski jumps are located within the ski area, at an elevation of roughly 600 meters above sea level, where ski jumping has been taking place since 1952. The ski jump facility, renovated in 1997, consists of three artificial turf jumps (K-point distances: 16, 30, and 50 meters) that comply with the latest FIS standards and are primarily used by young ski jumpers. The Kreuzbergschanze is the only ski jump in the Rhön region and in Lower Franconia, Bavaria. The three ski jumps are listed with certification numbers DSV 190 (K-16), 191 (K-30), and 192 (K-50) by the German Ski Association (DSV) until December 4, 2012. The largest event held at the ski jumps took place from January 24 to 26, 1964, during the Bavarian Nordic Winter Games for youth skiers. The longest distance achieved, albeit with a fall, was 74 meters by Henrik Ohlmeyer from SC Bischofsgrün.

=== Cross-country ski trails ===
The ski area is crisscrossed by two trails for classic cross-country skiing . The Neustädter Haus Loop (also known as the Small Loop) has a length of seven kilometers and is situated at an elevation of 630 to 750 meters above sea level. It is rated "difficult," as it involves a total ascent of 130 meters. The Kreuzberg Loop (also known as the Big Loop) is located at 750 to 820 meters above sea level. It spans nine kilometers, with a "moderate" difficulty level and the same 130 meters of elevation gain. The trailheads are located at the Kreuzberg and the Neustädter Haus.

=== Toboggan slopes ===
The ski area features two toboggan runs. One 300-meter-long run is located near Gasthof Roth at the end of the Kniebreche hiking route, next to the access road to Kreuzberg monastery, at approximately 840 meters above sea level. Another toboggan run, roughly 250 meters long, is located below the monastery garden at Kreuzberg at around 880 meters above sea level.

=== Winter Hiking Trails ===
The ski area is crisscrossed by several winter hiking trails. One four-kilometer track connects Haselbach to the Kreuzbergschanzen and up to the summit. Another 4.5-kilometer trail connects Haselbach to Neustädter Haus and continues to the Kreuzberg transmitter on the summit plateau. Additionally, there is a 4.5-kilometer winter hiking track that connects Arnsberg with the Kreuzberg monastery. There is 4.1-kilometer circular hiking track in the lower section of the ski area that takes you from Haselbach to the guest houses and the Caritasheim before returning to Haselbach.

== History ==
Ski operations at Kreuzberg began in the early decades of the 20th century. On Sundays, ski tourists would arrive via the Ski-Express, operated by the Deutsche Reichsbahn, from Schweinfurt and Würzburg to the Bischofsheim train station. From there, they would travel by bus or on foot to the ski area at Kreuzberg. On busy days, up to seven buses shuttled between Haselbach and Kreuzberg. Skiers would descend on unprepared slopes and narrow, steep meadows called "Wieslich" down to Haselbach. Until the 1950s, skiers were transported by bus from Haselbach to the ski area. Sometimes, after the descent, they would trek back uphill with skis on their shoulders, allowing for only about three descents per day.

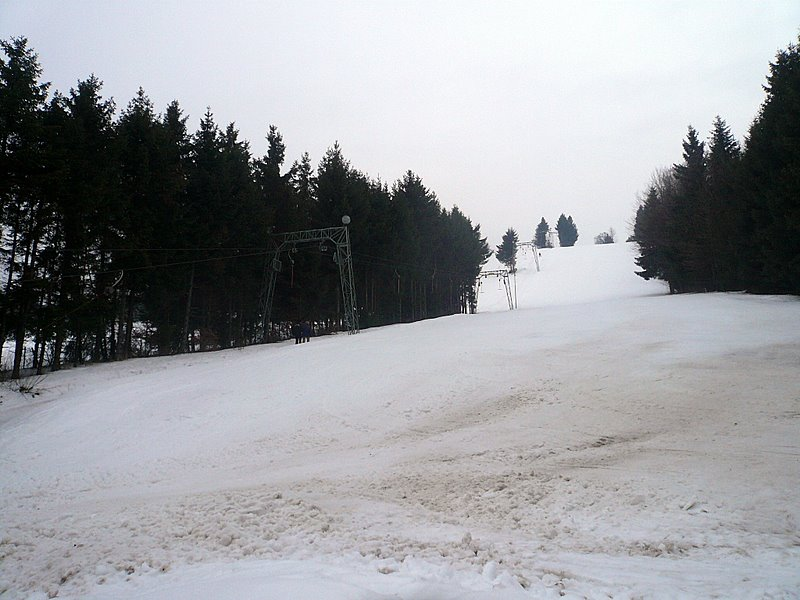
Rothanglift – Piste

In the years 1932 and 1933, the first ski jump was built in the ski area near the Fischzucht, which was reconstructed after World War II. In 1952, the construction of the Große Kreuzbergschanze began, which at that time was one of the largest ski jumps in Germany with a K-point of 75 meters. The Kleine Kreuzbergschanze with a K-point of 38 meters was built directly next to the large one between 1953 and 1954.

Otto Willert, a fountain pen manufacturer from Neuendorf near Lohr am Main, built the Blicklift in the summer of 1958, the first ski lift at Kreuzberg and one of the first outside the Alps in Germany. The ski lift, which took two and a half minutes to ascend, was originally equipped with wooden bars for passenger transportation. The elevator was later equipped with plastic bars. Regular ski operations began on December 4, 1958, and the lift became accessible on foot from Haselbach. At that time, the slope was prepared by compacting the snow with skis. Because there was minimal snowfall during the winter of 1958/1959, the lift operated for only 44 days during the inaugural season. On operational days, it was heavily visited, with visitors coming from the surrounding areas such as Aschaffenburg, Lohr am Main and Wertheim.

In 1963, the Rothanglift, the second ski lift at Kreuzberg, was put into operation with the base station near the access road to Kreuzberg monastery. A car parking was set up below the base station, allowing skiers to drive directly to the ski area by car. In 1964, the Dreitannenlift, the longest ski lift in the Rhön, was built. In 1968, a snow groomer was used for the first time to prepare the slopes.

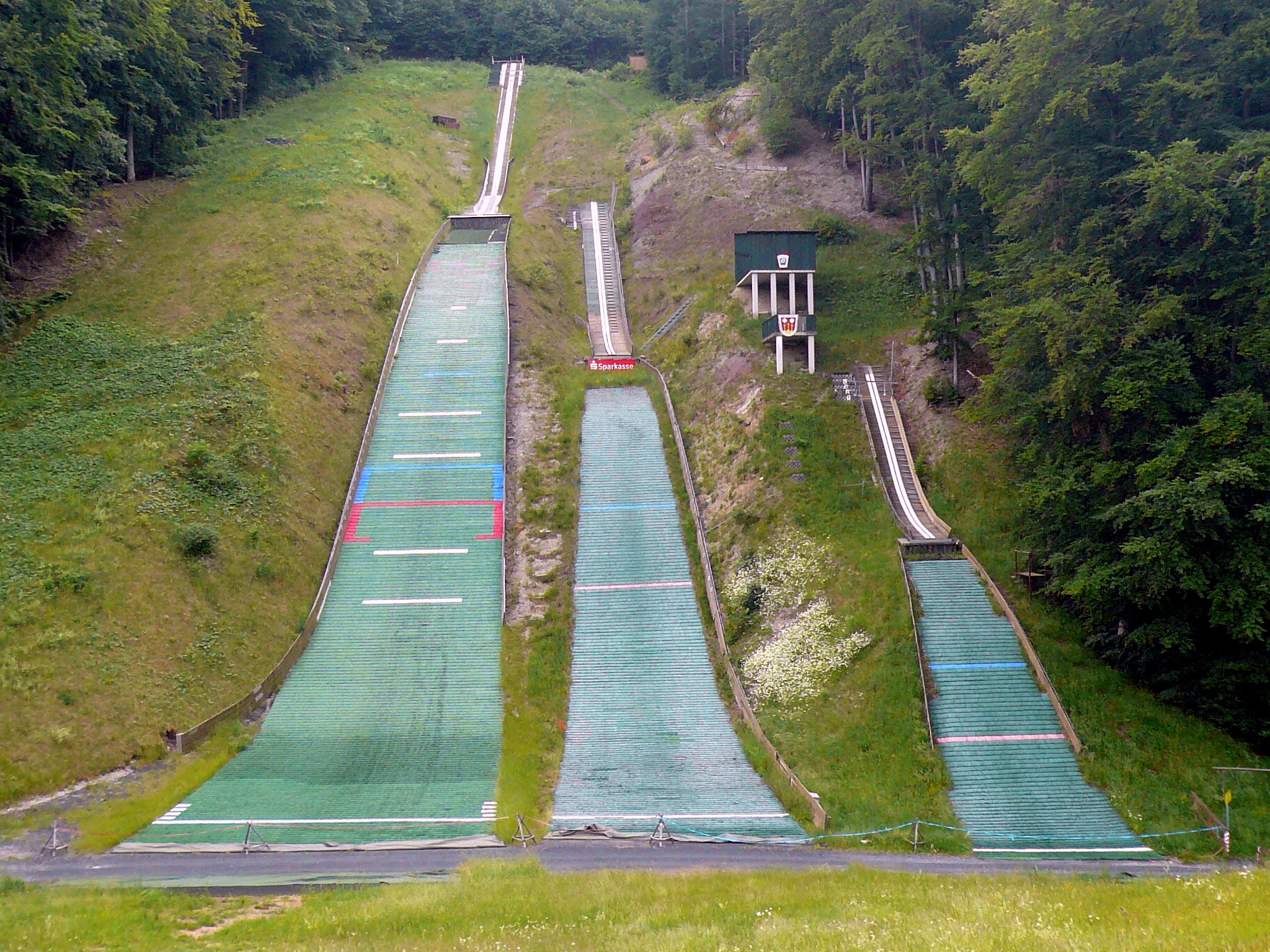
Kreuzbergschanze

The winter of 1969/1970 was the snowiest in the history of the Kreuzberg lifts. The first snowfall occurred in mid-November 1969 and remained until early April 1970. The lifts were operational for 143 days during this winter. The Fischzuchtlift, a family-owned enterprise, opened above the base station of the Dreitannenlift in 1970. The RWV Haselbach hosted the Grass Ski European Championship at Kreuzberg on September 9th and 10th, 1978, with athletes from seven nations competing in slalom and giant slalom. In February 1988, the last jump took place on the Kleine Kreuzbergschanze. The jumping on the Große Kreuzbergschanze had already been discontinued several years earlier.

The Kreuzberglifte recorded over 100 operating days in a season for the last time, with 116 and 117 days respectively. In 1986, Thomas Fuß leased the ski lifts. By the late 1980s, the winters at Kreuzberg were becoming increasingly snow-poor. The lifts operated for only six days, and in 1989/1990, they ran for 19 days. In 1997, new ski jumps with construction points of 16, 30, and 50 meters were built. The two smaller jumps were covered with mats, allowing for summer jumping. From the summer of 2005 to the spring of 2006, the 50-meter jump was also equipped with mats. The winter of 1998/1999 had the longest operating period since the late 1980s, with 57 days of operation. In January 2005, a fun park for snowboarders with various jump elements was opened at the Blicklift. In 2006, a new snow groomer with a flexible milling cutter and a wide track was acquired. This provided a total of three snow groomers. The winter of 2005/2006 was one of the snowiest in the history of the Kreuzberglifte. The first snowfall occurred in mid-November and remained until April. However, the snowfall amounts did not reach those of the winter of 1969/1970. The lifts were not in operation at all during the winter of 2006/2007 due to insufficient snowfall. The winter of 2008/2009 was snowy in the Rhön region. The Rothang and Blick lifts were operational from November with intermittent closures until the end of the winter season. The Dreitannenlift also had more operating days compared to previous years.
