= Beilstein (Rhön) =

Mountain in Hesse, Germany

Highest point
- Elevation: 864.6 m (2,837 ft)
- Coordinates: 50°24′12″N 9°53′23″E

Geography
- Location: Hesse, Germany

The Beilstein (German pronunciation: [ˈbaɪlʃtaɪn]) is an extinct volcano in Hesse, Germany that is 864.6 m above sea level (NHN). It rises in the Rhön Mountains, a Mittelgebirge in the German states of Bavaria, Hesse and Thuringia. It lies in the High Rhön on the Bavarian-Hessian border, which locally forms the boundary between the town of Gersfeld in the Hessian county of Fulda (district) and the market town of Wildflecken in the Bavarian county of Bad Kissingen.

On the mountain are parts of the Wildflecken Training Area and the Ludwigstein.
