= Großer Auersberg =

Mountain in Germany

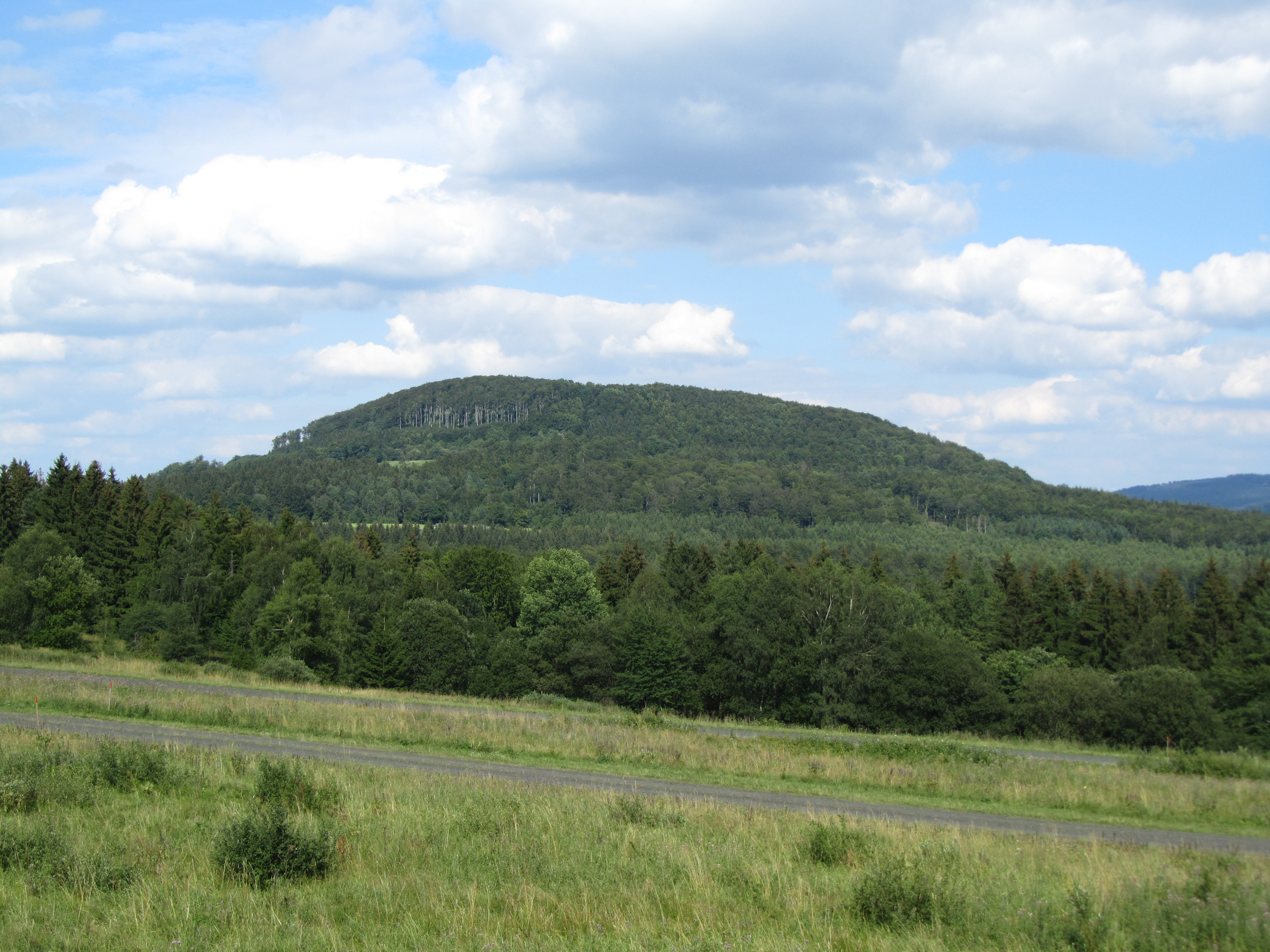
- The Großer Auersberg from the southwest Location in the county of Bad Kissingen

Highest point
- Elevation: 808.6 m above sea level (NN) (2,653 ft)
- Coordinates: 50°22′03″N 9°52′18″E

Geography
- Location within Bavaria
- Location: Bad Kissingen, Bavaria, Germany (Military out-of-bounds area)
- Parent range: Rhön

The Großer Auersberg is a mountain, 818 metres about sea level, in the Bavarian part of the Rhön mountains. It is located in an unparished area, 4.68 km² in area, in the county of Bad Kissingen, three kilometres southwest of the village centre of Wildflecken. The Großer Auersberg is covered by dense deciduous forest and lies within the Wildflecken Training Area, established in 1938. Most of the terrain is a military out-of-bounds area, which civilians may not enter. To the west-southwest rises the slightly higher Kleiner Auersberg. Neither should be confused with the Auersberg near Hilders in the Hessian part of the Rhön. For over 100 years, barite was mined at the Marie mine on the mountain.

== See also ==
- List of mountains and hills of the Rhön
