= Arnsberg (Rhön) =

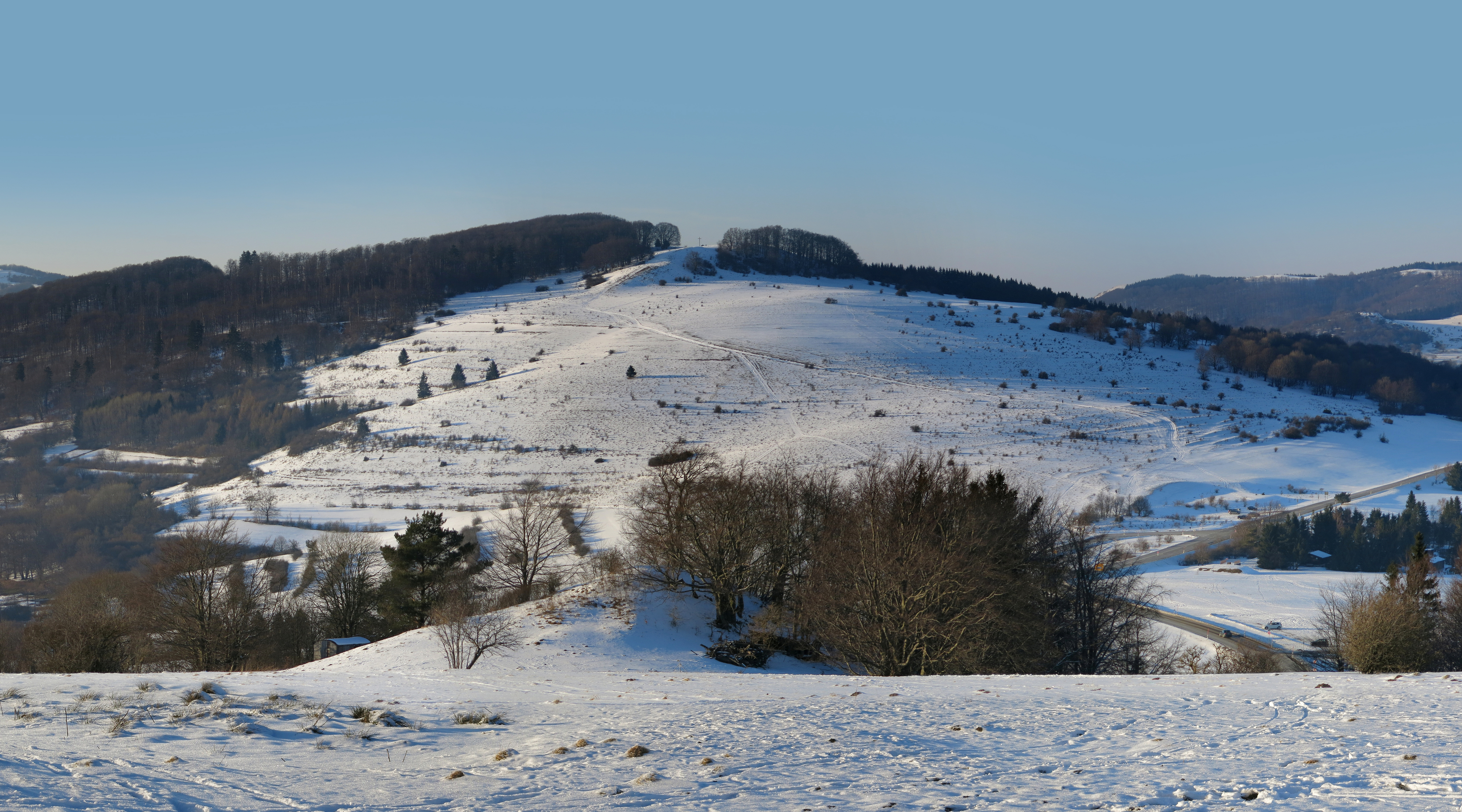

Highest point
- Elevation: 843 m (2,766 ft)
- Coordinates: 50°23′42″N 9°57′43″E

Geography
- Location: Bavaria, Germany
- Parent range: Rhön Mountains

Geology
- Mountain type: volcanic basalt

The Arnsberg is a mountain in the Bavarian part of the Rhön Mountains, Germany. It is located on the watershed in between the rivers Sinn and Brend. It rises three kilometers west of Bischofsheim in der Rhön and four kilometers northeast of Wildflecken.

The Arnsberg is only partially wooded and therefore offers a clear view of the higher mountains in its surroundings: the Himmeldunkberg (888 m) in the north, the Heidelstein (926 m) in the northeast, the Kreuzberg (928 m) in the south and the Dammersfeldkuppe (928 m) in the west. The Arnsberg also offers views far to the east into the Grabfeld and to the southwest.

The north side of the Arnsberg is a winter sports area with two ski lifts. In summer, the steep slopes are used by paragliders and model airplanes as well as grazing sheep.

The shortest ascent to the Arnsberg begins at the junction of the NES 25 district road from the NES 10 district road and leads steeply from the south-east to the summit in around 30 minutes.
