= Arnsberg (disambiguation) =

Arnsberg may refer to:

- Arnsberg, a city in Hochsauerlandkreis, Germany
- Arnsberg (region), Regierungsbezirk of North Rhine-Westphalia, Germany
- Arnsberg (Rhön), a mountain in Bavaria
- Arnsberg, Missouri, a community in the United States

== People ==
- Brad Arnsberg (b. 1963) American Baseball player
