= Himmeldunkberg =

Mountain in Hesse and Bavaria, Germany

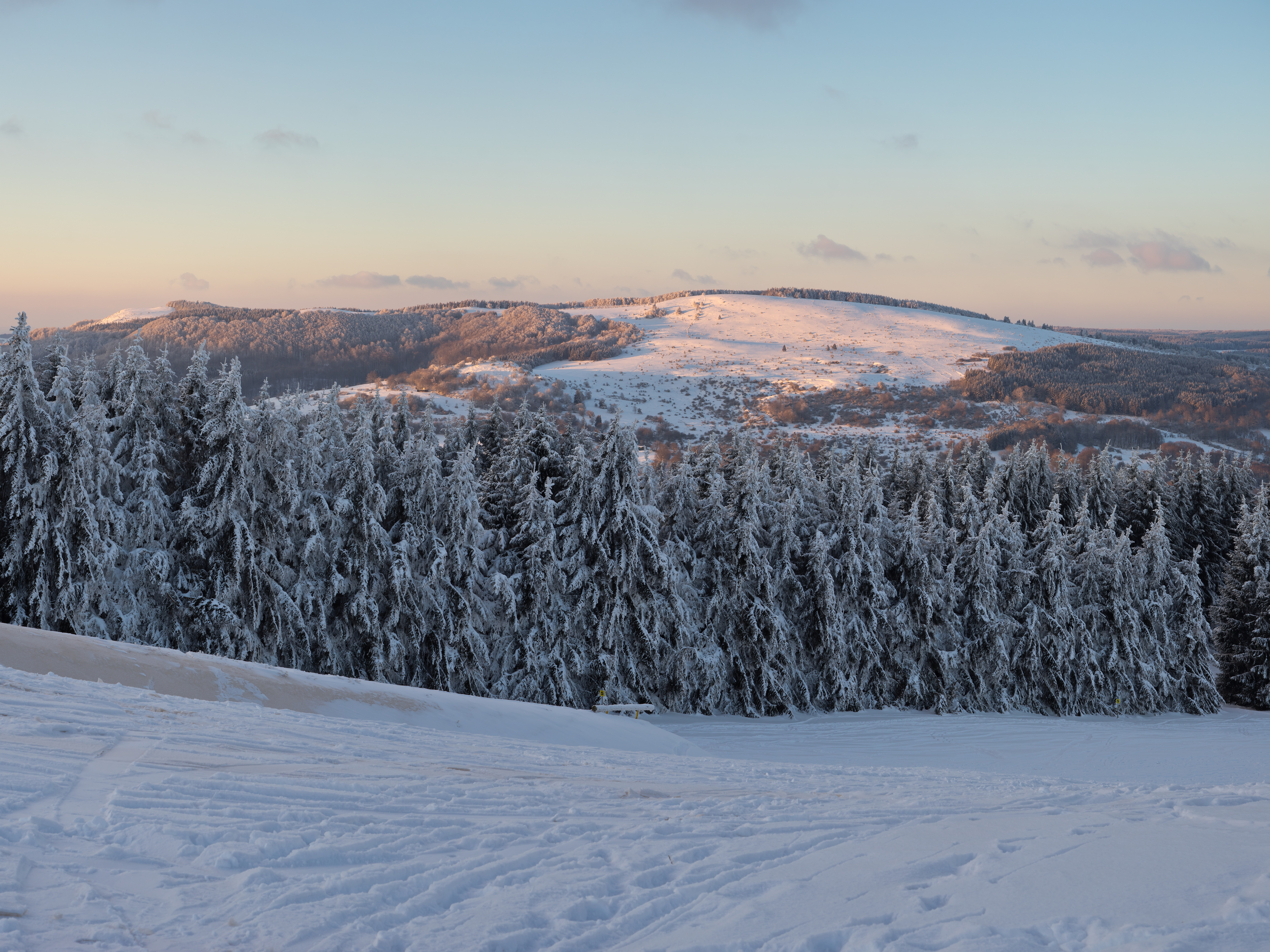
- View from Arnsberg north towards the Himmeldunkberg

Highest point
- Elevation: 888 m above sea level (NN) (2,913 ft)
- Coordinates: 50°25′22″N 9°57′35″E

Geography
- Location within Bavaria
- Location: Bavaria/Hessen, Germany
- Parent range: Rhön (Hohe Rhön)

Geology
- Mountain type: Extinct volcano
- Rock type(s): Basalt and tuff

Climbing
- Easiest route: from the Schwedenwall or Schwedenschanze car parks

The Himmeldunkberg or Himmeldunk is an extinct volcano, 888 m above sea level (NN) m high, in the High Rhön (Hohe Rhön) in Germany. It straddles the Bavarian-Hessian state border.

== Location and surrounding area ==
The Himmeldunkberg lies in the southwestern part of the Langen Rhön ("Long Rhön") which is in turn part of the High Rhön. 2 km south is the village of Oberweißenbrunn, 4 km to the southeast is the town of Bischofsheim an der Rhön and 3 km northwest is Gersfeld.

The Rhine-Weser watershed runs over the summit of the Himmeldunkberg and neighbouring hill of Hohe Hölle and forms the boundary between Bavaria and Hesse as well as the long-distance trail, the Rhön-Höhen-Weg (RHW). Border stones erected in 1872 show where the old border between the Kingdom of Bavaria and the Kingdom of Prussia ran.

== Geology ==
The Himmeldunkberg consists mainly of the volcanic rocks basalt and tuff.

== Description ==
The northern slope falls steeply away and is covered with mixed, deciduous forest. The arc from southwest to east is open; mainly covered by grasses, blackthorn, rose hips, silver thistles and bellflowers.

The Himmeldunkberg lies in a nature reserve of the same name; for that reason mountain bikes may only be used on tracks with mountain bike signs.

The mountain is an important site for unpowered aerial sports because it has the only suitable terrain for the demanding sport of model gliders with an east–west disposition for about 50 km around and was previously used by kite flyers and paragliders.

A refuge hut, the Würzburger Hütte, belonging to the Würzburg branch of the German Alpine Society (DAV) is situated on the western slope at a height of 835 m. There are plans to move the hut to a "place more compatible with nature preservation", and also to reach an agreement with the glider flyers who are not allowed to use the mountain any more.

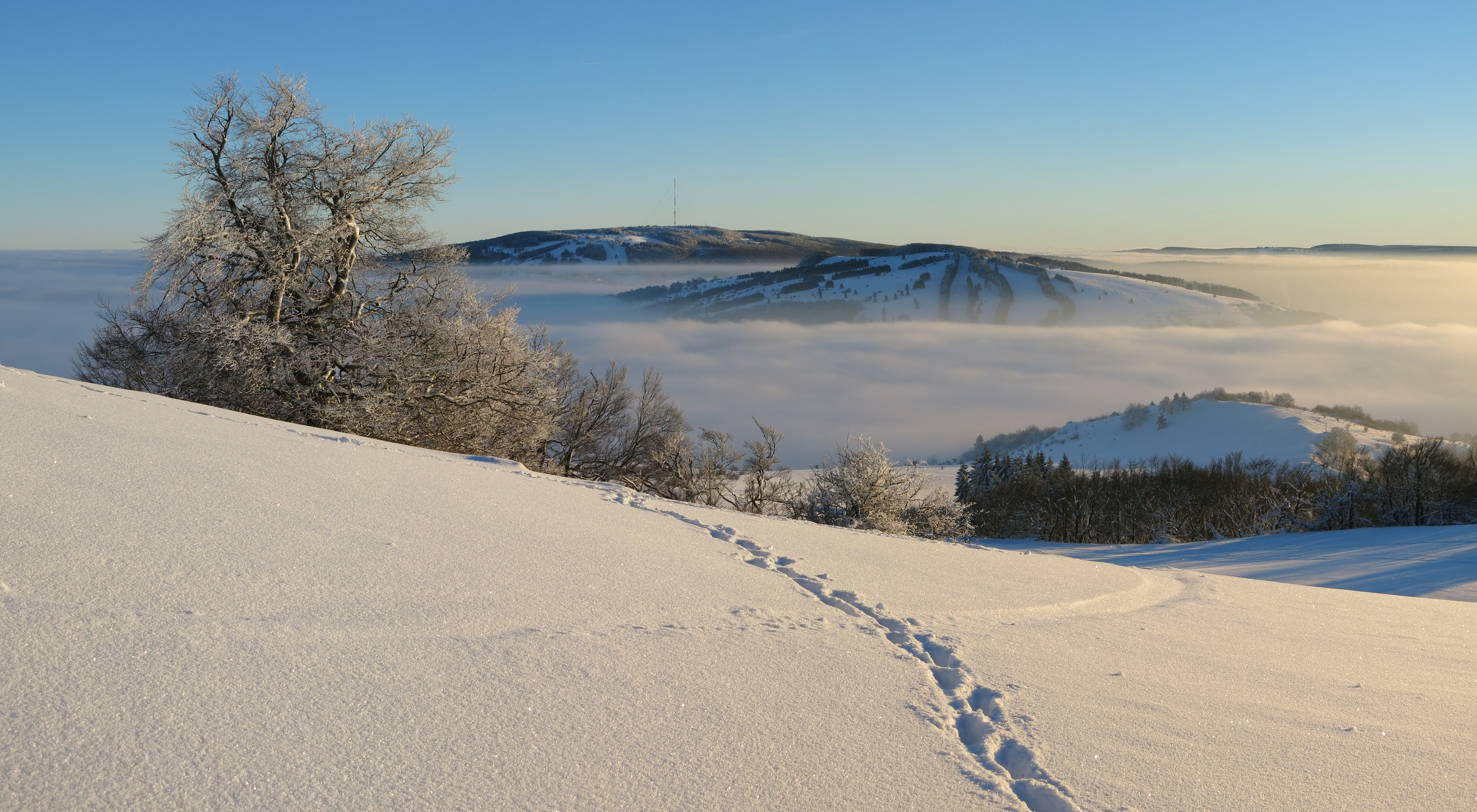
The Hexenbuchen, view towards the Kreuzberg

About 50 m south, below the summit, is the Hexenbuchen ("witches' beeches") nature monument, which is a favourite photographic subject.

From the plateau there is a superb view over Bischofsheim to the Kreuzberg, the Osterburg ruins, the Arnsberg, the Black Mountains, the Schachen, the Eierhauck, the Dammersfeld, the Reesberg, the valley of the Brend and the upper Sinn. In very good conditions the Fichtel Mountains can be seen. From the northeastern flank the Heidelstein is also visible.

== See also ==
- Rhön Mountains
