= Kreuzbergschanzen =

Ski jumping facility in Bavaria, Germany

Kreuzberg ski jumping hills
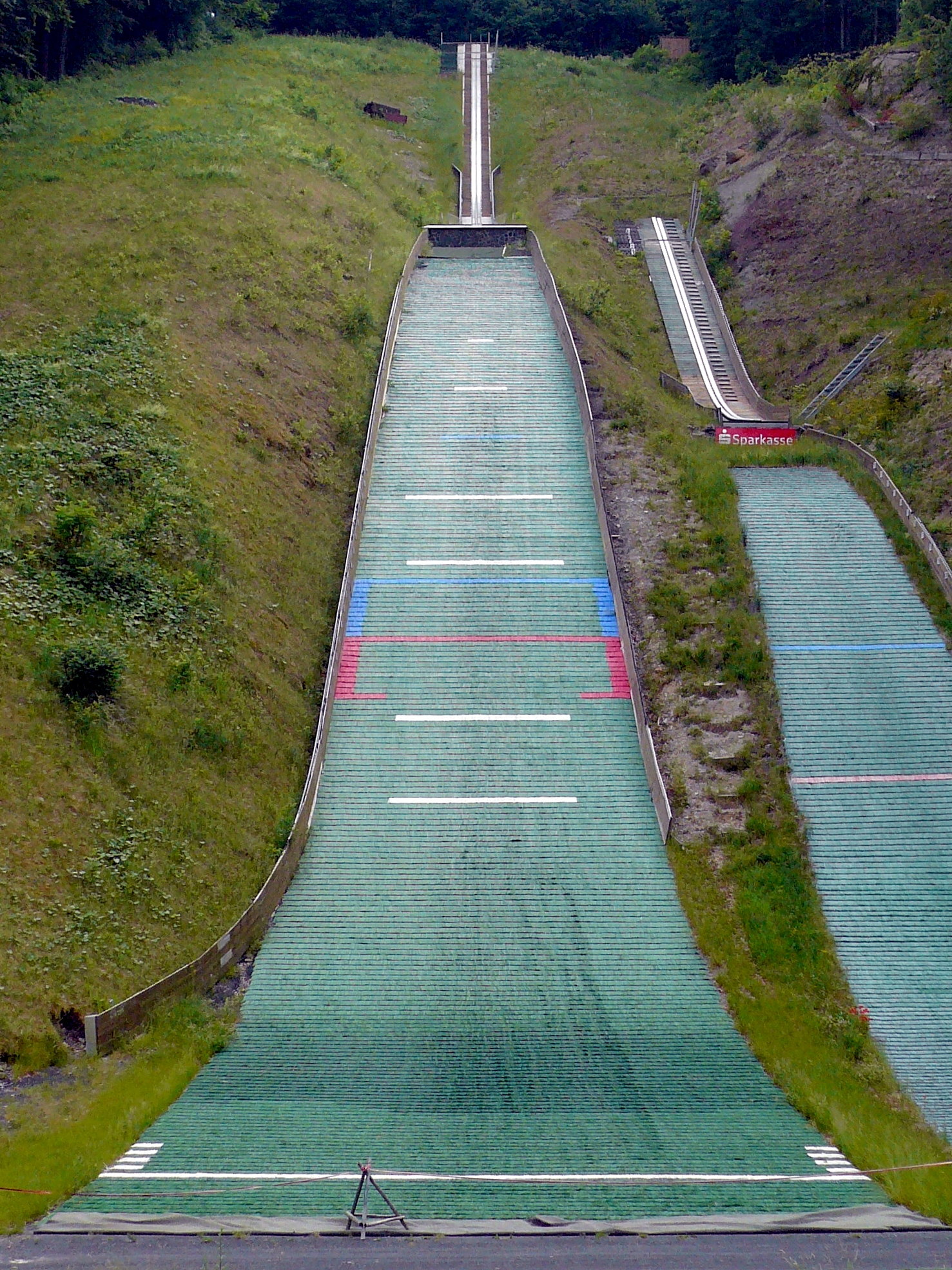
- Location: Haselbach; Bischofsheim in der Rhön; Germany
- Renovated: 2006

Size
- K–point: K 50
- Hill record: Summer: 54,5 meters Florian Enders (2006); Winter: 54,0 meters Jens Greiner-Hiero (2002)

The Kreuzberg ski jumping hills (German: Kreuzbergschanzen) are located near Haselbach, a district of Bischofsheim in der Rhön, on the northern slope of the 928 meter high Kreuzberg in the Bavarian Rhön. The ski jumping facility, which is 600 meters above sea level, consists of three plastic-covered ski jumping hills (K-points: 16, 30 and 50 meters), which meet the latest FIS standards and are mainly used by junior ski jumpers. Today, the Kreuzberg ski jump is the only ski jump in the Rhön and Lower Franconia, making it the ski jump center of the Lower Franconia ski region. The ski jumps are operated jointly by the Haselbach Cycling and Winter Sports Club (RWV) and the Oberweißenbrunn Winter Sports Club (WSV).

== Location ==
The Kreuzbergschanzen are located in the central Rhön region, about four kilometers from the Hessian border. It lies on the northern slope of a ridge that connects the Kreuzberg with the 842-meter-high Arnsberg, in a narrow valley through which the Haselbach stream flows. Due to its location in the middle of the valley, the jump is mostly sheltered from the wind and receives only a few hours of sunshine per day during the winter months, since the Kreuzberg is over 300 meters higher.

== Meaning ==
As the only ski jumping facility in the Rhön and the entire Lower Franconia ski region, the ski jump is of great importance to young ski jumpers. The jumpers come from all over Lower Franconia and southeastern Hesse. The importance of the ski jump has been further enhanced by the use of plastic matting on the K-50 jumping hill. This means that the youngsters who have already outgrown the K-30 jump no longer have to travel to Oberhof in Thuringia regularly for training. The K-50 jumping hill now serves as a springboard for young ski jumpers from Lower Franconia and the Rhön region to the Oberhof sports high school. They can now train longer in Haselbach. If they are good enough, they can move to Oberhof for jumping training.

== History ==
=== Old Kreuzbergschanze ===
The first ski jumping hill in Kreuzberg was built from 1932 to 1933 in the area near the fish farm with a wooden start tower (because the Fichtel family of Schweinfurt manufacturers had fish ponds there, this area on the Kreuzberg is called the fish farm). Today there is a forest in this place. During the Second World War, the ski jump fell into disrepair. It was renovated in the fall of 1949 by members of the RWV Haselbach club, who formed work groups to build the jump. The inns on the Kreuzberg took over the financing. The K-point was 35 meters and the jump record was 28 meters.

At a meeting of the Rhön ski district on February 20, 1949, in Bad Kissingen, discussions began about building a large ski jumping hill in the Bavarian Rhön, as the construction of a ski jumping facility, the Reesberg ski jump, had already begun in Gersfeld in the Hessian part of the Rhön. To proceed with the planning of the construction of a ski jump at Kreuzberg, it became necessary to gain more independence within the Bavarian Ski Association. The foundation of the RWV Haselbach on August 30, 1949, intensified the planning. In November 1950, the decision of founding the Lower Franconia-Rhön Ski Region was made.

=== Big Kreuzbergschanze ===
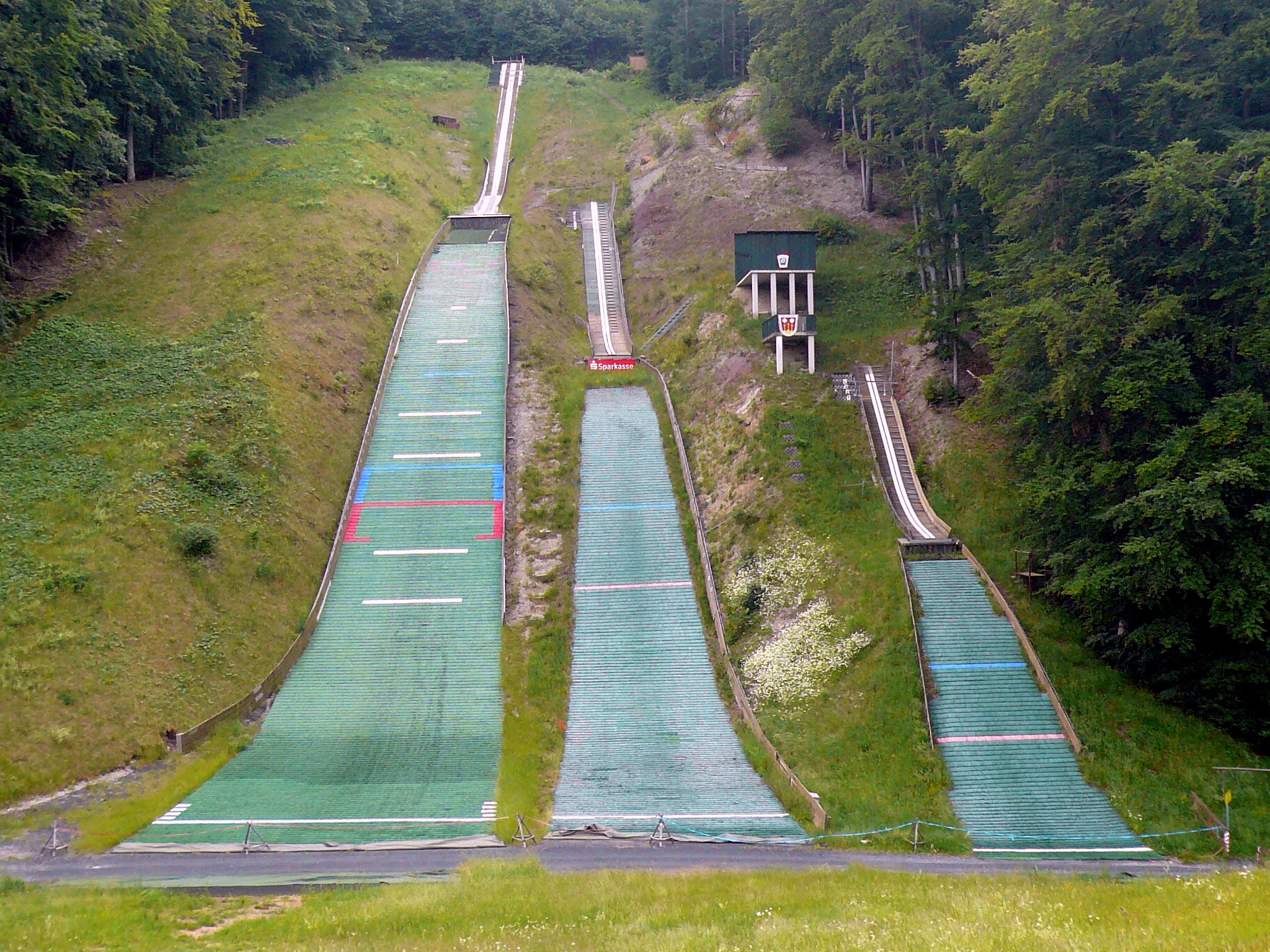
Jumping hills facility

The RWV Haselbach began building the big Kreuzberg ski jump in 1952. At the time, it was one of the largest ski jumps in Germany. The architect was Ernst Brönner from Aschaffenburg. All members of the club were called upon to help with the construction of the jump, either by volunteering 20 hours of work or by paying 20 German marks. On January 6, 1953, in front of 8,000 spectators, the new jump was inaugurated with the Herbert Hoesch Opening Competition (named after the deputy chairman of the ski area of Lower Franconia at the time), which had a K-point of 75 meters. Top-class ski jumpers from all over Germany came to the opening competition. The winner was the later national coach Ewald Roscher from Baden-Baden with jumps of 66 and 61 meters. The longest jumps were achieved by third-placed Franz Eder (German champion in 1954) from the Ramsau Ski Club near Berchtesgaden with a jump record of 69 meters. Another jump reached 75 meters, but could not be stopped. Since then, Epiphany competitions have been held regularly on the anniversary of the opening competition, the Epiphany ski jumping. The small Kreuzberg ski jump with a K-point of 38 meters was built directly next to the big Kreuzberg ski jump between 1953 and 1954.

==== Competitions ====
The German Youth Championships were held in 1954, and from January 28 until 30, 1955, the Bavarian Nordic Ski Championships (ski jumping, Nordic combined, and cross-country skiing), in front of 12,000 spectators, with well-known participants such as Max Bolkart and Gunder Gundersen. Helmut Böck became the Bavarian champion in combined ski jumping. Max Bolkart from Oberstdorf won the special jumping competition.

The Bavarian Youth Championships took place in 1956 with a maximum distance of 68.5 meters. A national competition followed in 1958 and a national comparison competition on February 25, 1962. The German champion Helmut Wegscheider jumped a new jump record of 70 meters. 1000 spectators were present. In 1963, the second Bavarian Ski Championships took place in front of 6000 spectators, making ski jumping in the Rhön famous. Heini Ihle jumped 75 meters on 20 January 1963 and fell. With his next jump of 70.5 meters, he set a new jump record.

From January 24 to 26, 1964, the Nordic Winter Games of the Bavarian Ski Youth took place with 60 jumpers, the largest event to date, in front of 3,500 spectators. There were some serious falls, which meant that the large ski jump had to be closed for safety reasons. The greatest distance, albeit a fall, was achieved by Henrik Ohlmeyer from SC Bischofsgrün with 74 meters. At this event, he set the jump record on the small jumping hill with 40 meters.

==== Reconstruction ====
In the 1970s, the take-off of the large Kreuzbergschanze was raised. Later, this ski jump no longer corresponded to the latest jump profile, and ski jumping was discontinued. In 1986, the first discussions about the construction of a new Kreuzbergschanze began. The last competition on the small Kreuzberg ski jump took place in February 1988. Another competition on January 6, 1990 (Epiphany ski jumping) had to be canceled due to a lack of snow. Due to technical defects in the now outdated Kreuzberg ski jumps, ski jumping had been discontinued there in previous years. The facility then fell into disrepair.

=== New Kreuzbergschanzen ===
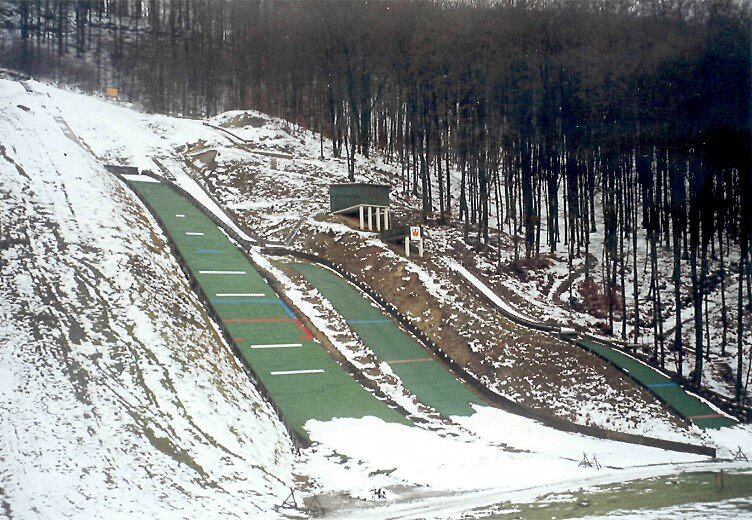
Jumping hill in winter 2006

During the construction of the school sports facility in Bischofsheim in 1991, the opposite slope of the current ski jump was filled with all of the excavated earth, which paved the way for the construction of the new ski jumping facility. In 1997, the new ski jumps were built on behalf of the district of Rhön-Grabfeld with construction points of 16, 30, and 50 meters. The topping-out ceremony took place on March 6, 1998. The new ski jump was inaugurated on October 25, 1998. The opening competition was attended by 100 ski jumpers from six regional associations in front of around 1000 spectators. Among the guests of honor was former ski flying world record holder Manfred Wolf from Steinbach-Hallenberg.

It is a modern ski jumping facility that complies with the latest technology, allowing young athletes to train and compete year-round by covering the K-16 and K-30 jumps with plastic matting. The K-50 jump was originally designed for winter use only. Both the individual jumps and the entire ski jumping facility are now called Kreuzberg ski jump. In the years 1999 to 2002, several ski jumping competitions were held, such as the eighth and ninth Bavarian School Cup and the first plastic-covered Rhön Cup competitions on the K-16 and K-30 jumps, some with up to 1100 spectators.

On January 5, 2002, the traditional Epiphany ski jumping took place for the first time on snow on the K-50 jump. The jump record of 54 meters was set and is still valid today. On July 21, 2002, the first Kloster-Kreuzberg jumping cup competition took place, which has been held every year since then. The Epiphany ski jumping, originally scheduled for January 6, 2005, was postponed due to lack of snow and rescheduled for March 12, 2005. The longest distance achieved was 52 meters.

From the summer of 2005 to the spring of 2006, after years of financing problems, the K-50 ski jump was covered with 2400 plastic mattings for 120,000 euros, so it has also been suitable for summer use since 2006. For financial reasons, a 15,000 euro snow net has not yet been installed, which is why the ski jump can currently only be used in summer. The substructure of the landing slope consists of impregnated larch wood and around 500 cubic meters of basalt gravel. On top of this are foam mats and a plastic grid, to which the actual mats are attached using 12,000 cable ties. The two clubs put in a total of 3300 hours of voluntary work.

On May 21, 2006, the K-50 ski jump was officially inaugurated with an opening competition. The 19-year-old Florian Enders set a ski jump record of 54.5 meters. On September 30 and October 1, 2006, the 5th German Masters Championships in special jumping took place, with 75 participants from 25 clubs, on the K-50 ski jump as the peak until today. Jumpers between the ages of 13 and 71 took part in this competition, divided into age groups.

== Ski jump facility ==
=== General ===
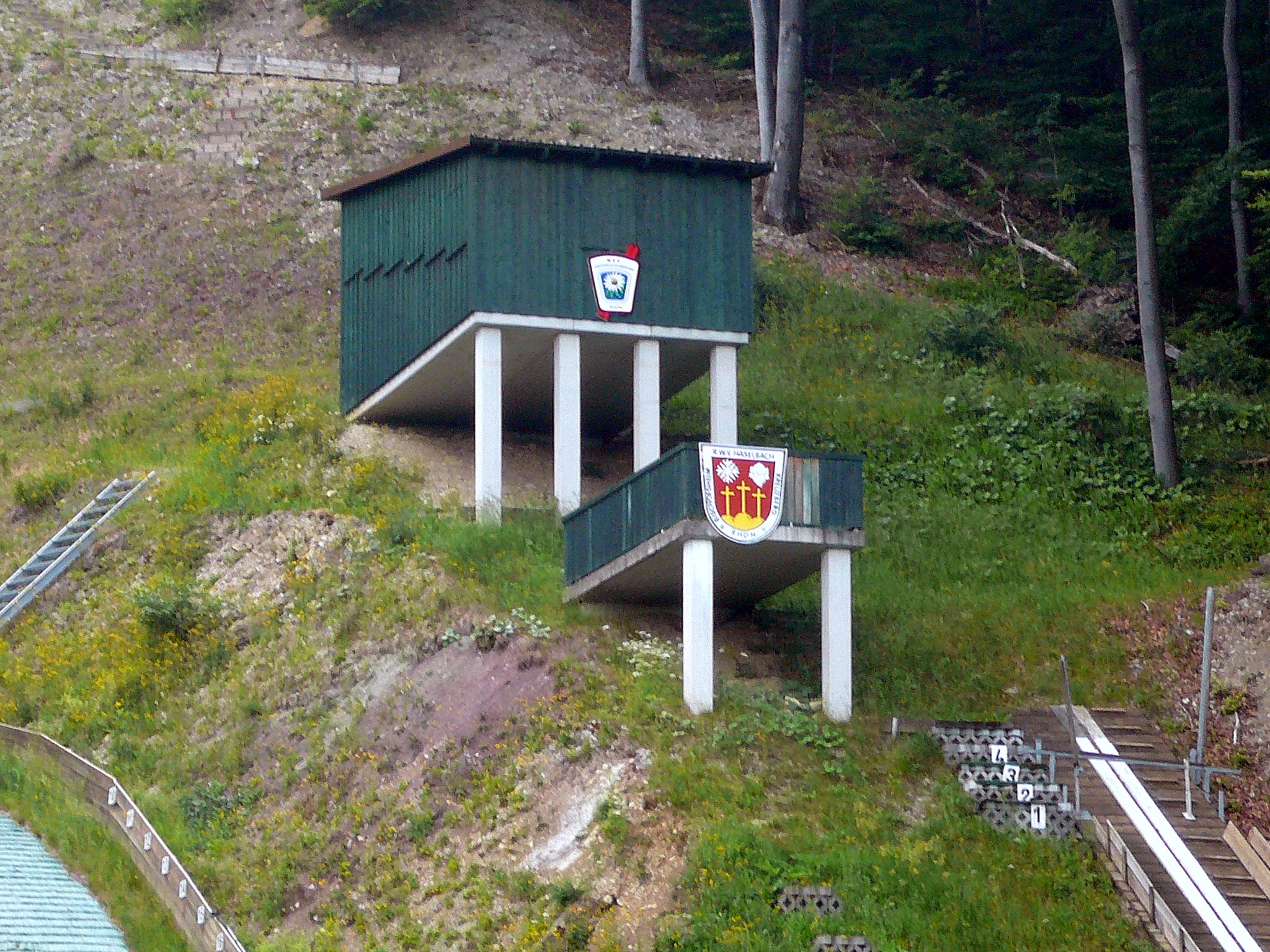
Jumping platform

The Kreuzbergschanze consists of three plastic-covered jumps, a ceramic run-up track for the jumps K-16 and K-30, and a stainless steel run-up track for the jump K-50. The three ski jumps are certified by the German Ski Association (DSV) with the certificate numbers DSV 190 (K-16), 191 (K-30), and 192 (K-50) and are valid until December 4, 2012.

The three ski jumping hills are natural ski jumping hills, which is why no run-up tower is required. The entire ski jumping facility, from the run-up area to the landing area, was adapted to the natural environment by moving the earth. The water supply for mat jumping in summer is provided by sprinklers, which are activated as required. The run-up area also needs to be watered regularly.

=== Ski jumps details ===
The technical details of the ski jumps have the following characteristics:

K50

In run

In run length 50.92 m
Take-off table
Table height 1.50 m

Inclination of the take-off table (α) 10.5°

Landing
Construction point 50 m

Height difference table edge to K-point (h) 23.0 m

Length difference table edge to K-point (n) 44.4 m

Ratio of height to length difference (h/n) 0.518

K-point angle of inclination (β) 33.9°

K30

In run

In run length 27,38 m
Take-off table
Table height 0,90 m

Inclination of the take-off table (α) 8,5°

Landing
Construction point 30 m

Height difference table edge to K-point (h) 13,50 m

Length difference table edge to K-point (n) 26,80 m

Ratio of height to length difference (h/n) 0,504

K-point angle of inclination (β) 32,8°

K16

In run

In run length 16,36 m
Take-off table
Table height 0,43 m

Inclination of the take-off table (α) 8,5°

Landing
Construction point 16 m

Height difference table edge to K-point (h) 7,02 m

Length difference table edge to K-point (n) 14,40 m

Ratio of height to length difference (h/n) 0,488

K-point angle of inclination (β) 31,0°

The ski jumping hill record for the K50 is 54.5 meters (2006), and the records for the K30 and K16 are 31.0 meters (2002) and 16.0 meters respectively.

== Bibliography ==
- Ski region Lower Franconia/Rhön (ed.): 50 Jahre Skigau – Festrede. Winfried Pöpperl. 2000.
- Haselbach cycling and winter sports club (ed.): Vereinschronik RWV Haselbach. Waldemar Korb. Haselbach 2000.
- Bavarian National Surveying Office (ed.): Naturpark Rhön - Südkarte. 1:50,000. Munich 1999, ISBN 3-86038-490-2
