= Auersburg Castle =

Ruined hill castle in Hilders, Hesse, Germany

Ruine Auersburg
- Auersburg
- Hilders
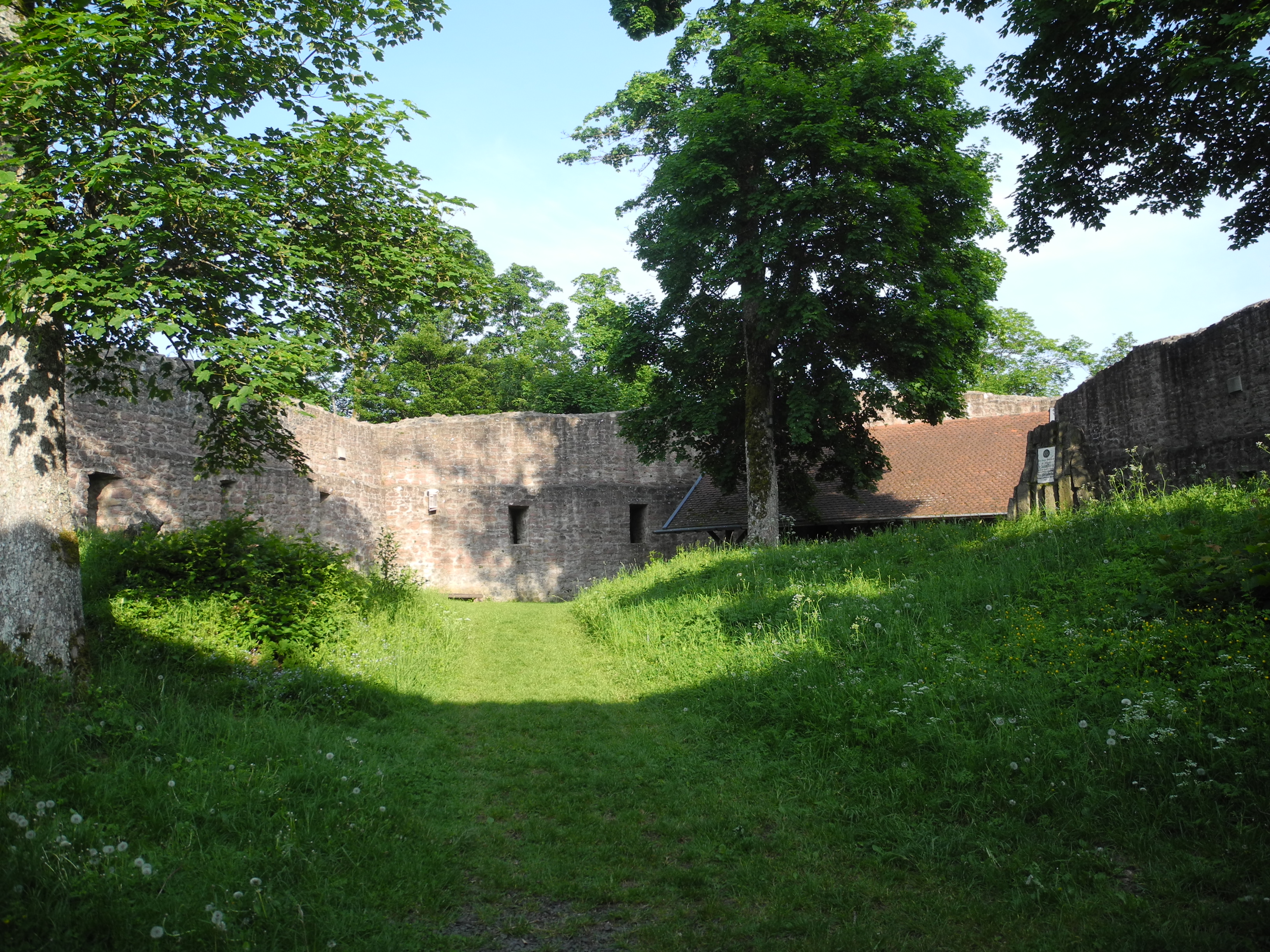
- View from the entrance looking east (May 2018)

Site information
- Type: Hill castle, forward slope position
- Code: DE-HE
- Condition: Enceinte, tower remains, bank and ditch

Location
- Coordinates: 50°35.33′N 9°59.82′E
- Height: Height missing, see template documentation

Site history
- Built: c. 1120

Garrison information
- Occupants: clergy

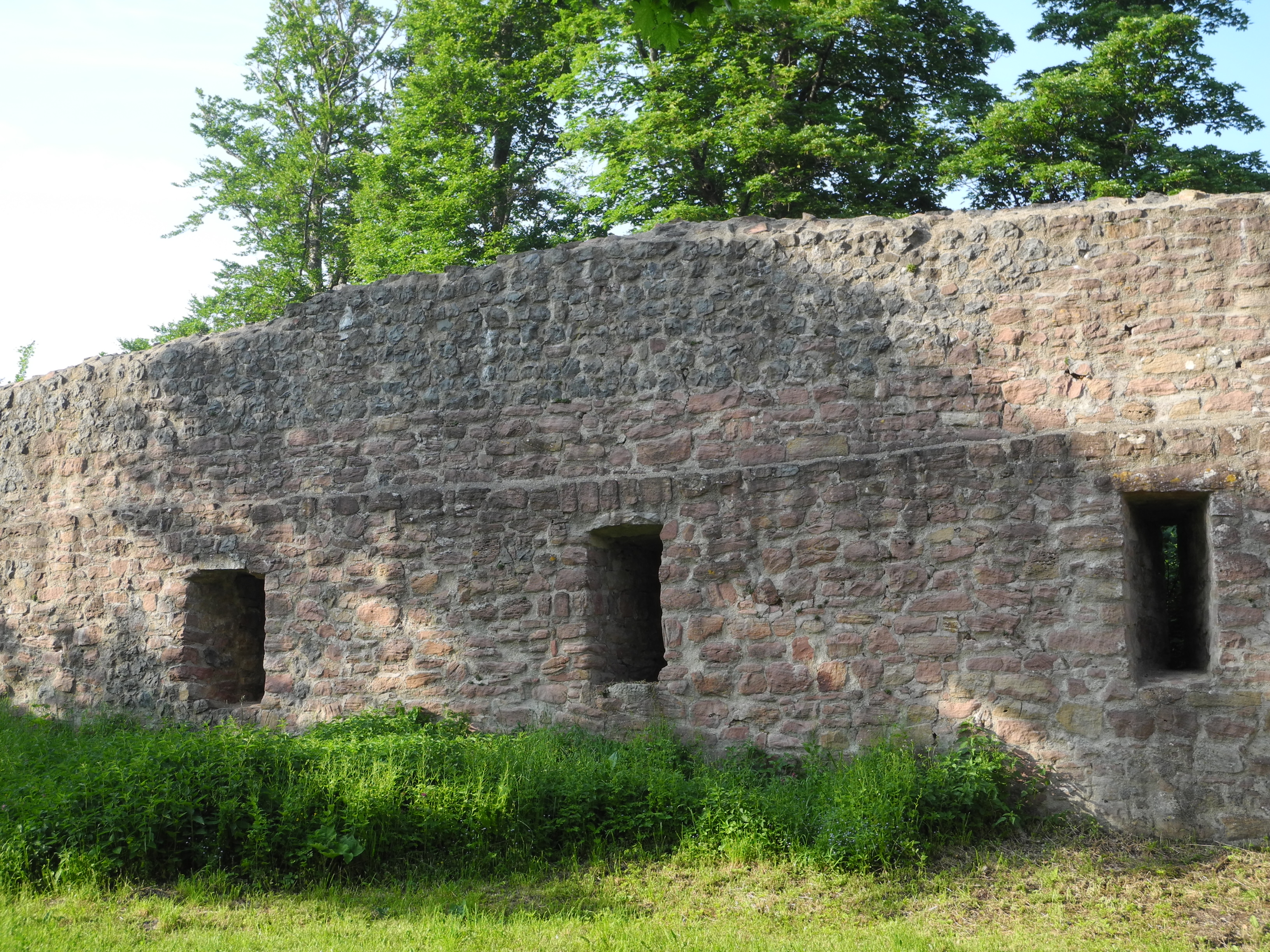
View of the enceinte and mansize loopholes

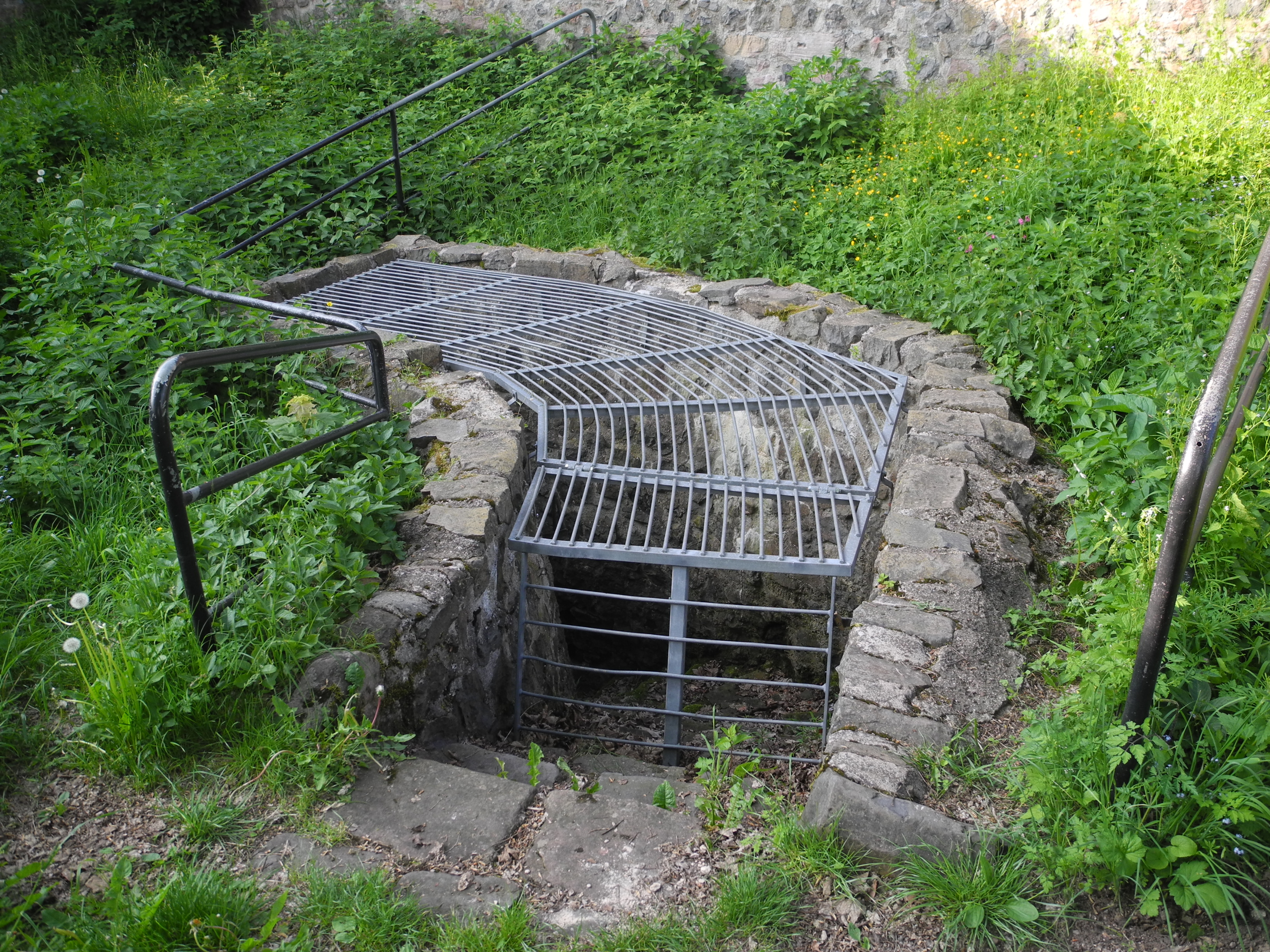
Entrance to the cellars

Auersburg Castle is a ruined hill castle in parish of Hilders in the county of Fulda in Hesse, Germany. The site is used today as a shelter and viewing platform.

== Location ==
The ruins are surrounded by forest on the southwestern slope of the 757-metre-high Auersberg in the Rhön Mountains, at the end of a popular hiking trail north of Hilders. Built on a militarily vulnerable, forward slope position, it was probably intended from the outset only as a seat of power or office.

== History ==
Although the earliest record only goes back to 1214, the castle is clearly much older. In 914, the area around Hilders came into the possession of Regenher of Weid as the result of an exchange of estates by Fulda Abbey and it was Regenher who probably built the first castle on the Auersberg. Around 1120 it was renovated or remodelled into a small knight's castle, probably by the counts of Henneberg, who had since acquired the territory. It was then used either as the seat of a younger brother or one of their vogts. Thereafter it had a very varied history, being located as it was on the border between several rival ecclesial and secular rulers.

In 1214, the Lord of Nithardshusen from the House of Henneberg, sold the property back to Fulda Abbey. They, in turn, enfeoffed it and, by 1270, the lords of von der Tann resided there.

== Legends ==
There are various legends associated with the Auersburg, such as the Auersburg Ghost (Gespenst von der Auersburg) and the Last of the Auersburgers (Letzten Auersbergern).

== Literature ==
- Rudolf Knappe: Mittelalterliche Burgen in Hessen. 800 Burgen, Burgruinen und Burgstätten. 3. Auflage. Wartberg-Verlag, Gudensberg-Gleichen 2000, ISBN 3-86134-228-6, p. 204.
- Rolf Müller (ed.): Schlösser, Burgen, alte Mauern. Herausgegeben vom Hessendienst der Staatskanzlei, Wiesbaden 1990, ISBN 3-89214-017-0, pp. 181–183.
