= Auersberg (Hilders) =

Mountain near Hilders, Hesse, Germany

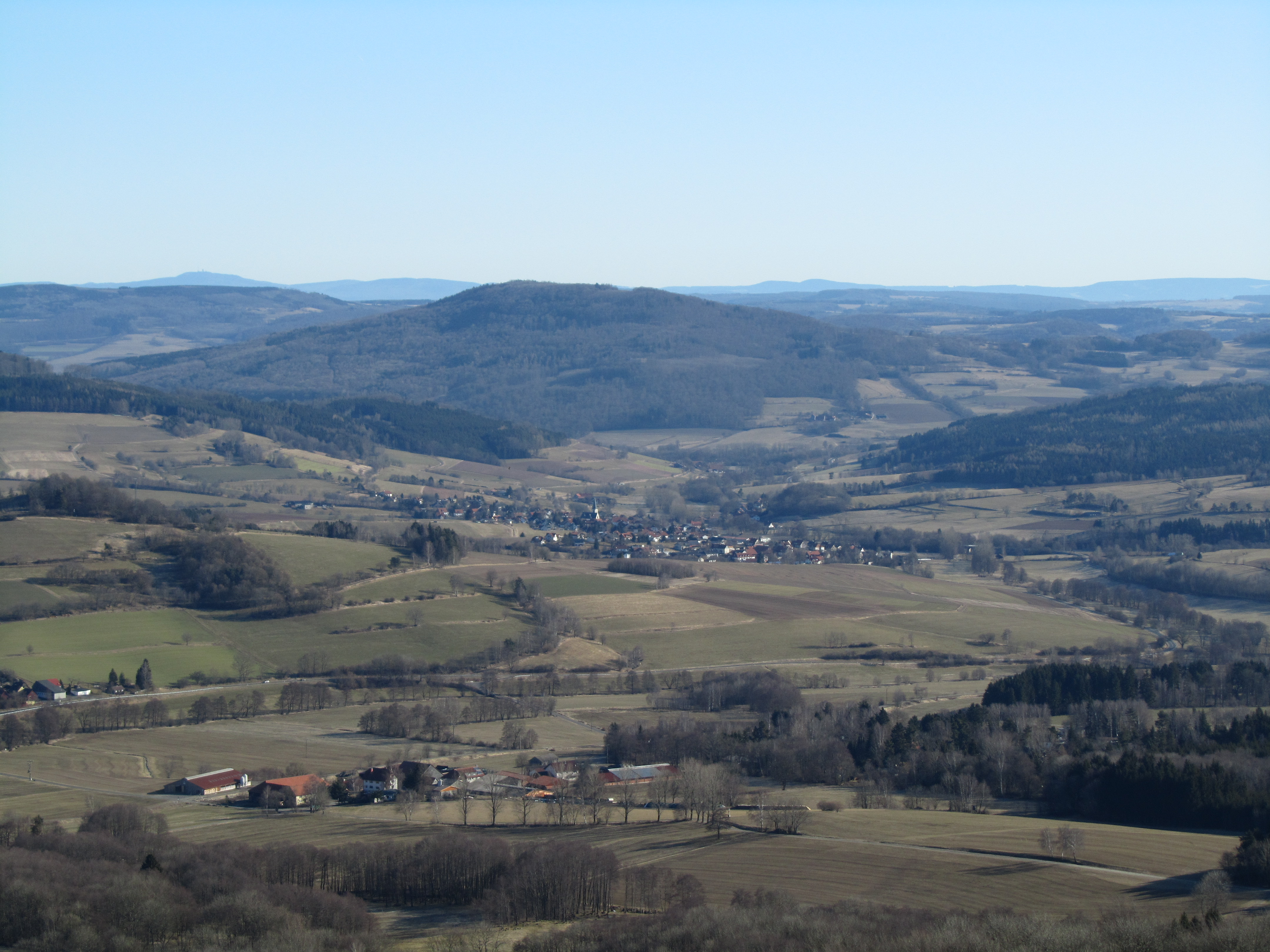
- The Auersberg from the southwest, seen from the Milseburg

Highest point
- Elevation: 757 m (2,484 ft)
- Prominence: 140 m (460 ft)
- Isolation: 9.85 km (6.12 mi)
- Coordinates: 50°35′50″N 10°00′34″E

Geography
- Location within Hesse
- Location: Fulda, Hesse
- Parent range: Rhön

The Auersberg is a mountain, 757 m above sea level (NN), in the Rhön, that rises immediately north of Hilders, eastern Hesse. East of the wooded peak lies Simmershausen, a village in the municipality of Hilders, and to the north is Lahrbach, in the municipality of Tann (Rhön). On the southwestern slopes of the mountain are the ruins of Auersburg Castle. Like the western side of the peak these are on the Main-Werra Way, a tourist path managed by the Rhön Club. The Ulster flows past the Auersberg just to the west. The Auersberg near Hilders should not be confused with the Großer and Kleiner Auersberg near Wildflecken in the Bavarian part of the Rhön.

== See also ==
- List of mountains and hills of the Rhön
