= Dammersfeldkuppe =

Mountain in Germany

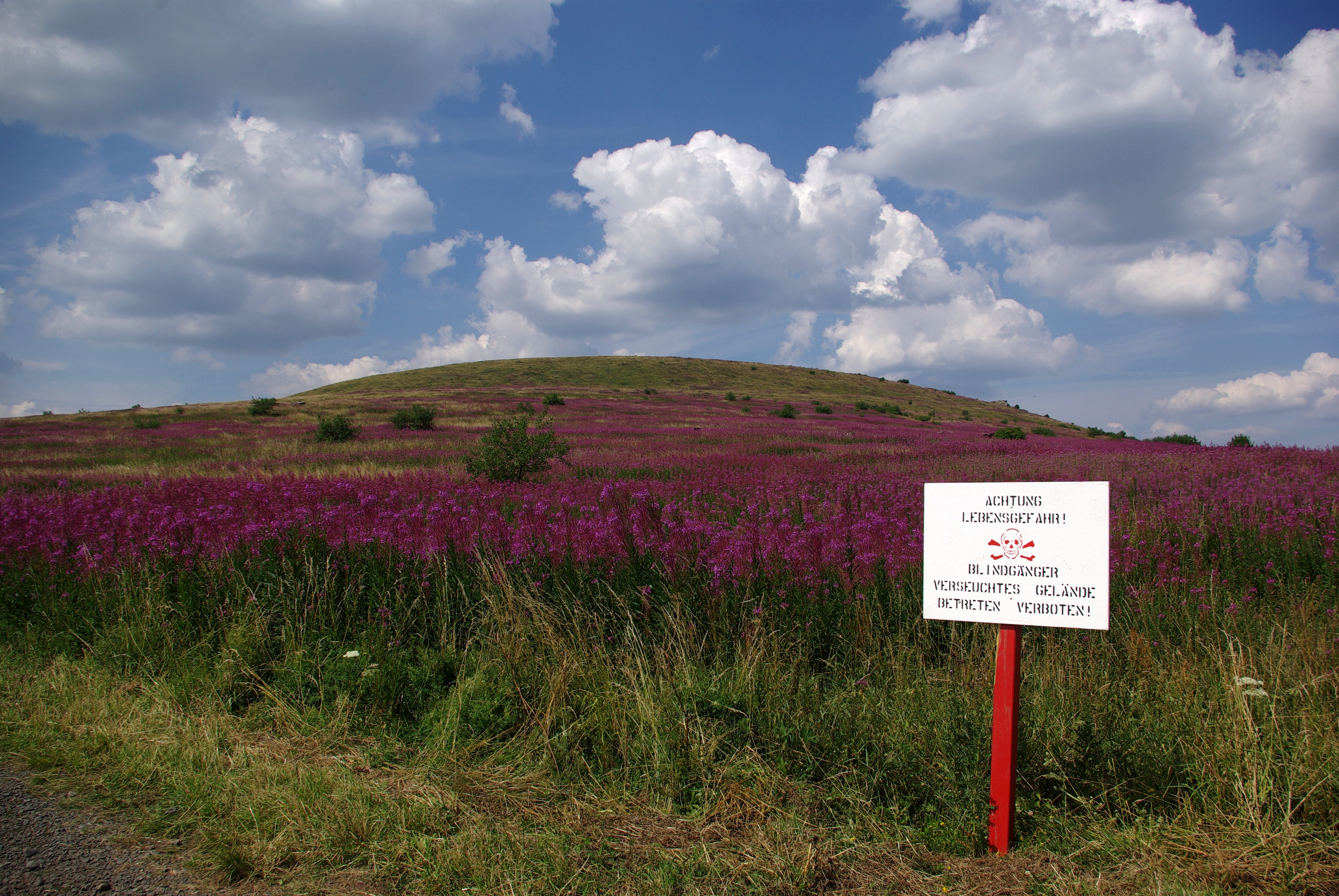

Highest point
- Elevation: 927.9 m (3,044 ft)
- Prominence: 213 m (699 ft)
- Parent peak: Wasserkuppe
- Isolation: 12.46 km (7.74 mi)
- Coordinates: 50°23′49″N 9°51′44″E

Geography
- Location within Bavaria
- Location: Districts of Bad Kissingen and Fulda; Bavaria and Hesse; Germany
- Parent range: Rhön Mountains (Hohe Rhön)

At 927.9 m above sea level (NN) the Dammersfeldkuppe in Bavaria is the second highest mountain after the Wasserkuppe (950.2 m above NN; Hessen) in the Rhön, a low mountain range straddling the states of Bavaria, Hesse and Thuringia in Germany.

== Location ==
The Dammersfeldkuppe is situated in the districts of Bad Kissingen (Bavaria) and Fulda (Hesse) and is one of the peaks of the "High Rhön" (Hohe Rhön). Its dome is in Bavaria about 200 m southeast of the border with Hesse between Gersfeld (Hesse), Bad Brückenau and Wildflecken (both in Bavaria).

The entire mountain lies within the Wildflecken Military Training Area and is surrounded by the Bavarian Rhön Nature Park and Rhön Biosphere Reserve.

The Rhine-Weser watershed runs through the Dammersfeldkuppe. The source of the Schmalnau is on the northern flank of the mountain; its waters flow through the Fulda into the Weser. On the mountain's southern flank rises the Kleine Sinn ("Little Sinn"), the Bavarian name of the Schmale Sinn, whose water makes its way via the Sinn, Franconian Saale and Main to the Rhine.

== Annual training area walk ==
Because the Wildflecken Military Training Area extends over the Dammersfeldkuppe it is usually closed to the public. However a tradition that was started by the US Forces and continued by the Bundeswehr after the Americans pulled out of Wildflecken in 1994, is the annual summer walk or Volksmarsch through the out-of-bounds area. This provides an opportunity to walk across the otherwise inaccessible terrain and the summit of the mountain on specified paths.

== Literature ==
- Unvergessene Heimat rund um`s Dammersfeld. Die abgesiedelten Ortschaften des Truppenübungsplatzes Wildflecken. Geiger, Horb am Neckar 1988, ISBN 3-89264-184-6.
