= Restricted military area =

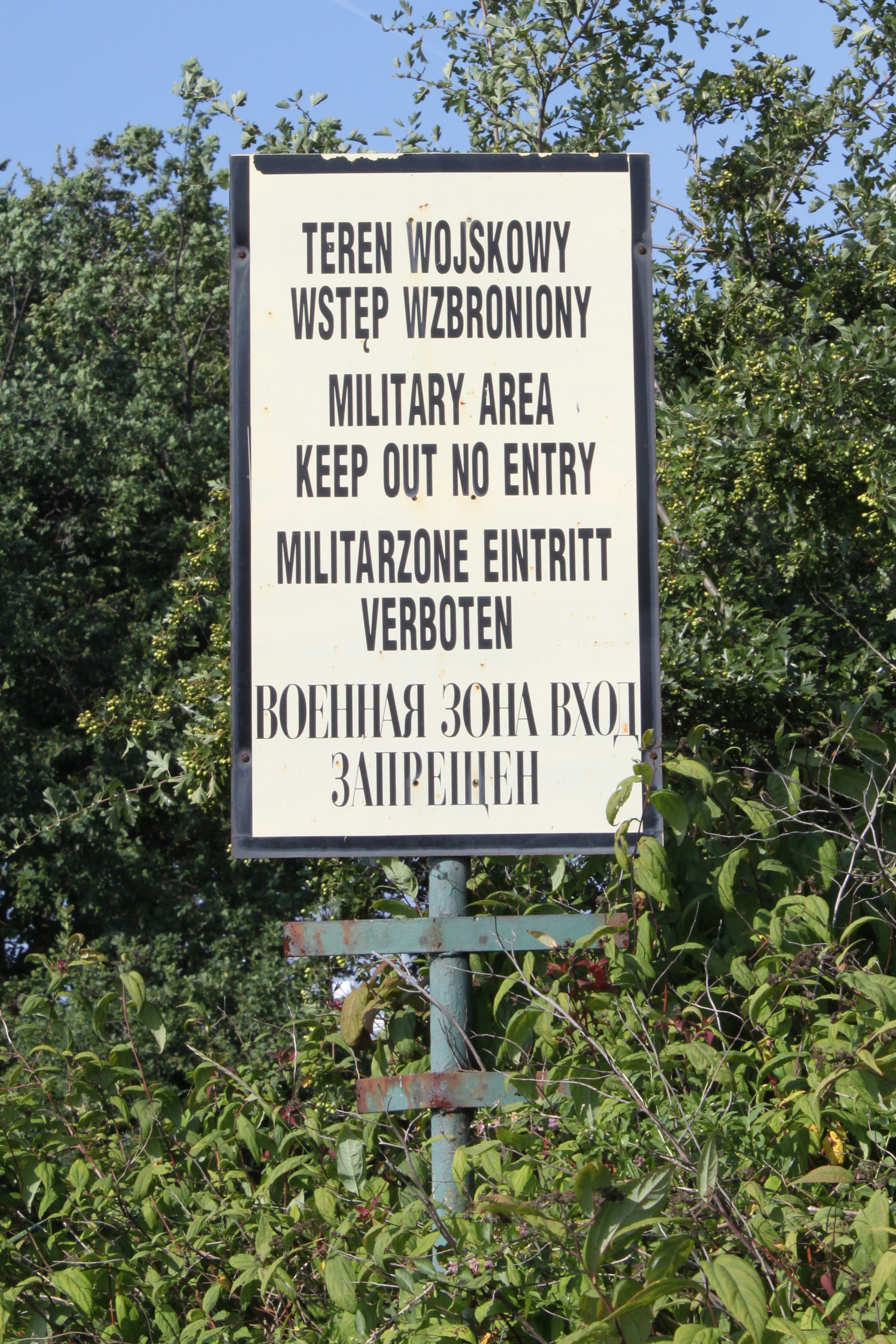
Military area sign in four languages (Polish, English, German and Russian) in Westerplatte

A restricted military area or military out-of-bounds area is an area under military jurisdiction where special security measures are used to prevent unauthorized entry.

== Legal restrictions ==
Restricted military areas are associated with strict legal restrictions. In Australia, military bases cannot be sketched, drawn, photographed and people who do so are subject to 6 months imprisonment. Even approaching a base with equipment capable of doing those things is forbidden. In the United States, trespass of a military base without permission is punishable by six months imprisonment.

Restricted military areas have been relied upon as a legal justification for the eviction of Palestinians in the occupied West Bank.

== In popular culture ==
Restrictions against access to military bases has been a source of pop-culture myths, as in the case of Area 51 in the United States. Classified activities on such bases and the secrecy surrounding those activities have captured public imagination. One such example is the Roswell incident, where debris from a classified military balloon became a UFO myth.

Works of fiction have been written about prominent military bases. The Australian TV series Pine Gap is one such series; with a narrative centring on joint defence operations at the international intelligence facility Pine Gap, south-west of Alice Springs, Australia.

== List of notable restricted military areas ==
The following is a list of notable restricted military areas:

Name	Country	Restricted since	Note	Image
Area 51	United States	1955	Acquired initially in 1955 by the USAF and CIA for the purpose of flight testing Lockheed U-2 aircraft	
Brdy	Czech Republic	1925	Range of hills, mostly covered by forest	
Penhale Sands	United Kingdom	1939	The restricted military area, Penhale Camp, is found on the northern part of the dunes	
Pine Gap	Australia	1970	Partly run by the US Central Intelligence Agency (CIA), US National Security Agency (NSA), and US National Reconnaissance Office (NRO) and is a key contributor to the NSA's global interception/surveillance effort, which included the ECHELON program Central Australia was chosen because it was too remote for spy ships passing in international waters to intercept its signals	
Woomera Prohibited Area	Australia	1947	Initially used as the site of Britain's rocket testing program. Nuclear tests were carried out for Britain also seven times between 1956 and 1963. Aboriginal Australians were forcibly relocated from the site In modern times it is used by the UK, USA, and Australia for testing	

== See also ==
- Military exclusion zone
