= Wildflecken Training Area =

Military training area in Germany

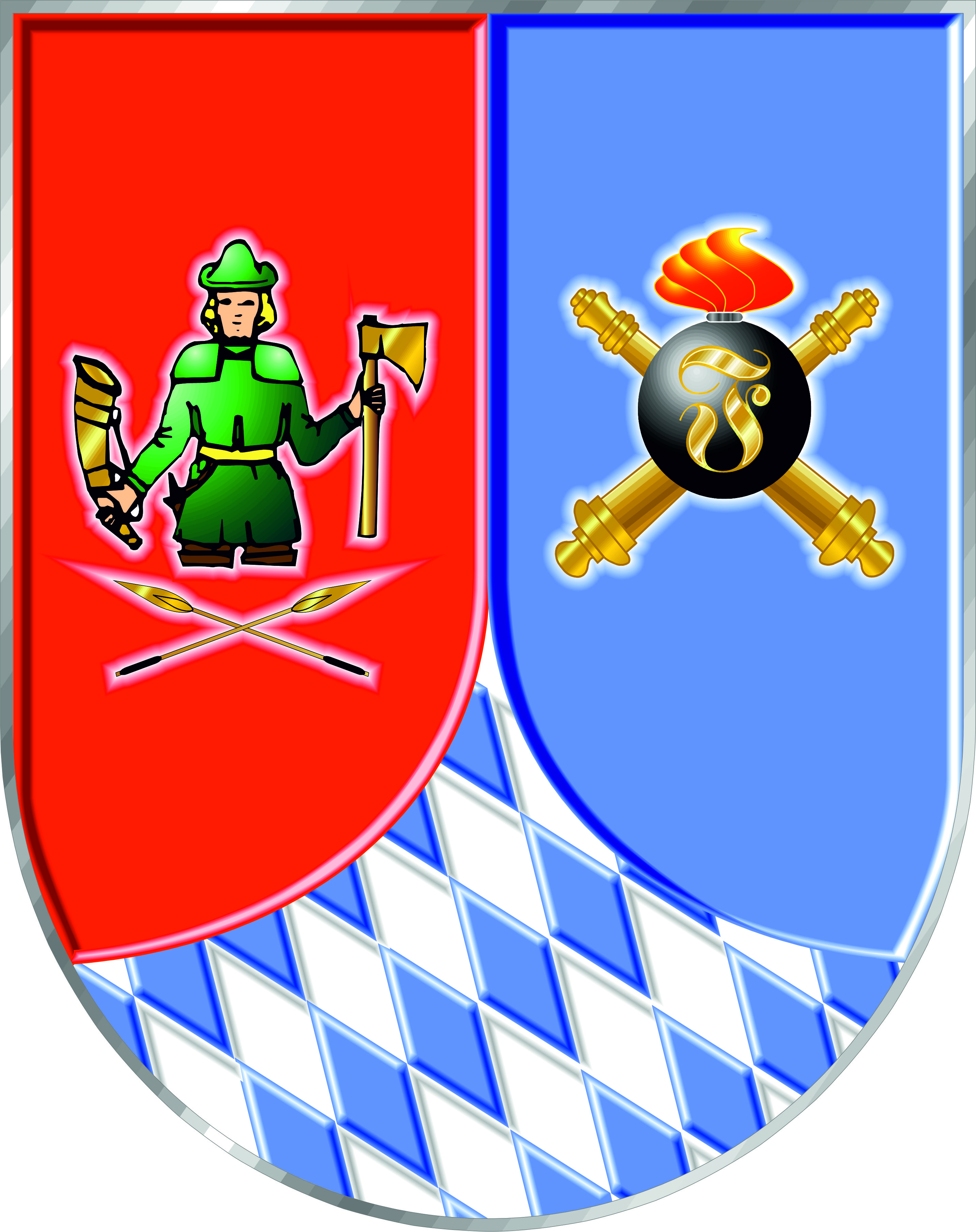
- Internal formation flash of the Training Area Headquarters
- Active: 1938
- Country: Germany
- Allegiance: Bundeswehr
- Branch: Streitkräftebasis
- Part of: Kommando Territoriale Aufgaben der Bundeswehr
- Location: Wildflecken

The Wildflecken Training Area (German: Truppenübungsplatz Wildflecken) is a military training area near Wildflecken in the High Rhön mountains in Germany. It covers an area of over 7,000 hectares. It was established in 1938 by the German Wehrmacht and, after the Second World War was used temporarily by the US Army. Today the training area and the Army Combat Simulation Centre there are used by the Bundeswehr and her NATO allies. The barracks and most of the training area are in Bavaria. The northern part of the training area lies on Hessian soil. In the winter the Americans operated a ski lift in the Hessian part of the training area.

== Bibliography ==
- Christa Jäckel: Wie aus einer Kulturlandschaft ein Truppenübungsplatz wurde. In: Rhönwacht. Heft 3. Fulda 2007, ISSN 0936-1723, S. 109–111.
- Joachim S. Hohmann: Landvolk unterm Hakenkreuz – Agrar- und Rassenpolitik in der Rhön. Frankfurt am Main 1992.
- Manfred Neidert: Der Truppenübungsplatz Wildflecken entsteht. Kreisausschuss des Landkreises Fulda, Fulda 1996, S. 253–257.
- Burckhard, Paul Die Truppenübungsplätze Grafenwöhr, Hohenfels, Wildflecken. Weiden 1989.
- Gerwin Kellermann: 475 Jahre Wildflecken 1524–1999. Marktgemeinde Wildflecken, Wildflecken 1999.
- Adam R. Seipp: Strangers in the Wild Place. Refugees, Americans, and a German Town, 1945–1952. Indiana University Press, Bloomington/Indianapolis 2013, ISBN 978-0-253-00677-6 (englisch).
