= Kreuzberg (Rhön) =

Mountain in Southern Germany

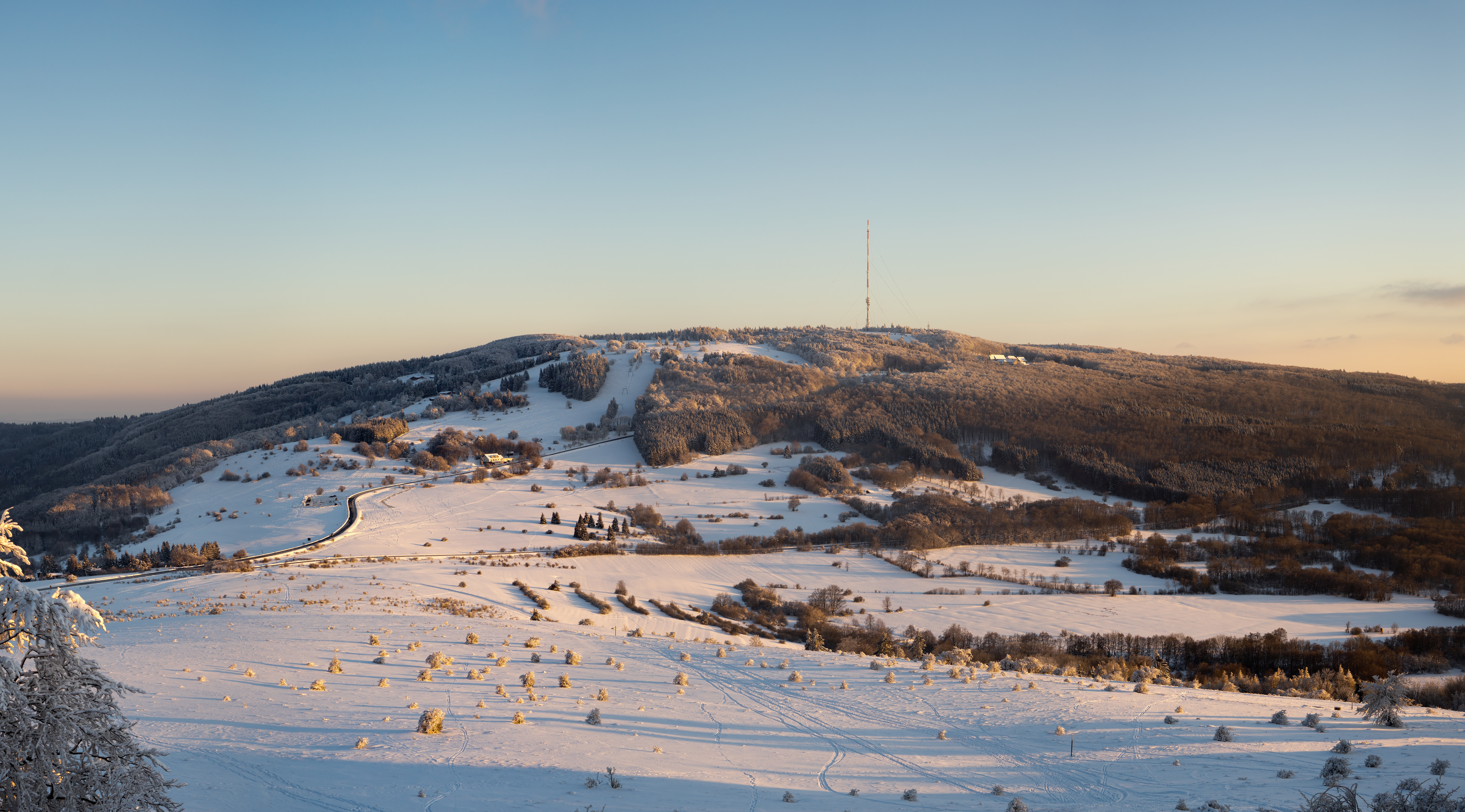
- Kreuzberg seen from the north. Photo taken from the Arnsberg

Highest point
- Elevation: 928 m (3,045 ft)
- Isolation: 14.47 km (8.99 mi)
- Coordinates: 50°22′15″N 9°58′06″E

Naming
- English translation: Cross Mountain
- Language of name: German
- Pronunciation: [ˈkʁɔʏtsbɛʁk]

Geography
- Location within Germany Location within Bavaria
- Location: Lower Franconia, Germany
- Parent range: Rhön Mountains

The Kreuzberg is one of the Rhön Mountains in southern Germany. With about 928 m (3,045 ft) high it is the highest elevation of the Bavarian part of the Rhön, in the province of Lower Franconia. The Kreuzberg — also referred to as the "sacred mountain of the Franconians" — is near the town of Bischofsheim in der Rhön in the district Rhön-Grabfeld.

== History ==
The Kreuzberg in the Rhön has always attracted people as a place of power. In pre-Christian times there was a sacred ash tree there, which is remembered by the old name Aschberg. Since St. Kilian and his companions missionized the Franconians in 686, Kreuzberg has been considered the "Sacred Mountain of the Franconians". The monastery, located just below the summit, was founded in 1644 by Franciscans monks. The pilgrimages are popular with the population both in the surrounding area and traditionally from the Lower Franconian district town of Würzburg, who make the long pilgrimage on foot to the pilgrimage church every year.

== Tourism ==
The Kreuzberg draws a large number of tourists. People visit the Kreuzberg particularly for hiking and or to go skiing in the winter. To that end there are three ski lifts on the northern side of the mountain. In addition, there is also a luge track on the Kreuzberg.

Kreuzberg Monastery (Kloster Kreuzberg), which is situated just below the summit of the mountain, is one of the main attractions as well. There are frequent pilgrimages to the monastery church. The monastery is also famous for its beer, which was brewed on site by the monks until about 1992. Today the beer is brewed by laypersons under the supervision of the monks. Three different beers (Dunkel, Pilsner and Hefe-Weizen) are produced year-round and a fourth (Weihnachts-Bock) is available during the Christmas season. Approximately 8,500 hectoliters of beer are brewed each year at the monastery.

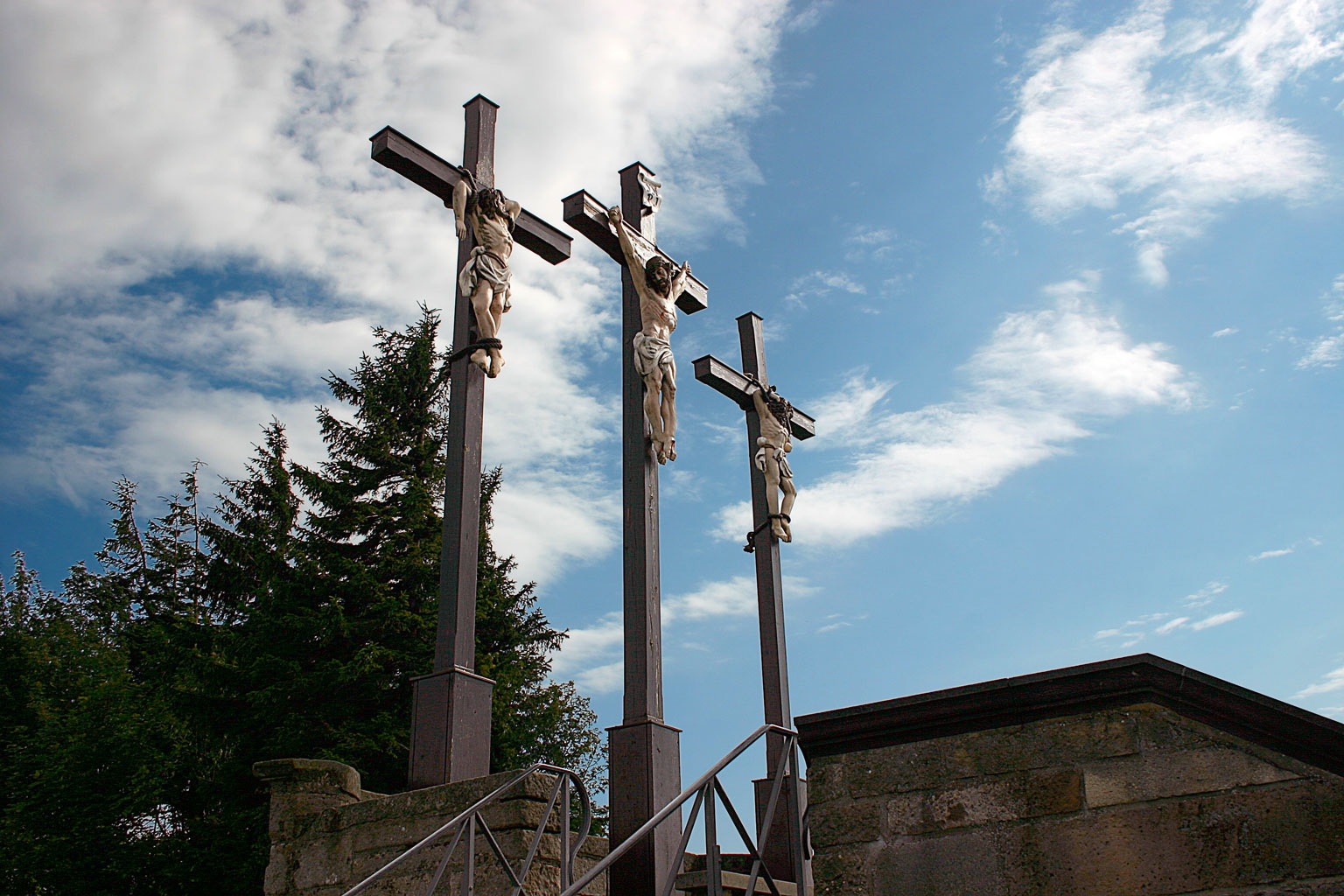
The three crosses on the Kreuzberg

== Broadcasting ==
There is a facility for FM radio and TV broadcasting (the Kreuzberg transmitter) situated at 928 m AMSL on the Kreuzberg. A 156 m (512 ft) high guyed mast transmission tower was established in 1951 and used until 1985. It has since been replaced by a 208 m (682 ft) high guyed mast.

== See also ==
- Kreuzberg ski area
