= Wildflecken =

- Municipality
- Coat of arms

- Location of Wildflecken within Bad Kissingen district
- Interactive map of Wildflecken
- Location within Germany Location within Bavaria
- Coordinates: 50°22′N 09°55′E
- Country: Germany
- State: Bavaria
- Admin. region: Unterfranken
- District: Bad Kissingen

Government
  - Mayor (2020–26): Gerd Kleinhenz

Area
  - Total: 77.56 km^{2} (29.95 sq mi)
- Elevation: 516 m (1,693 ft)

Population (2025-12-31)
  - Total: 2,863
  - Density: 36.91/km^{2} (95.61/sq mi)
- Time zone: UTC+01:00 (CET)
  - Summer (DST): UTC+02:00 (CEST)
- Postal codes: 97772
- Dialling codes: 09745, 09749
- Vehicle registration: KG, BRK, HAB
- Website: www.wildflecken.de

Wildflecken is a municipality in the Bad Kissingen district, at the border of northwestern Bavaria and southern Hesse. In 2022, its population was 2,935; the postal code is 97772 (US Forces used APO NY 09026 until July 15, 1991, when APO/FPO/DPO addresses got their own "state" codes, when "NY" became "AE"). Wildflecken is in the picturesque Rhön Mountains.

== Army base ==
In 1937, the German Army established a large training area northeast of the village, large enough to house some 9,000 troops and 1,500 mounts. The camp (Camp Wildflecken) provings were primarily used by the land forces of the Wehrmacht and the Waffen-SS. During the war, several Wehrmacht and Waffen-SS divisions each were activated and trained for combat in Wildflecken. Also located in the area were an ammunition factory and two camps holding Russian, Belgian and French prisoners of war.

In April 1945, elements of the U.S. 14th Armored Division took control of the camp and the training area.

From April 1945 to 1951, the base was a displaced persons camp housing approximately 20,000 displaced persons (DPs) primarily of Polish origin, operated first by UNRRA, then by IRO. A Polish cemetery holds the camp's residents who died during those five years.

After 1951, its range served as a US Army training base operated by the 7th Army Training Command in Grafenwöhr, and it was home station for several Army units including armored, mechanized infantry, military intelligence and logistics units (most notably the 373d Armored Infantry Brigade of the 19th (later 4th) Armored Group). It also served as a base for West German Bundesgrenzschutz (border police) units and later for the new German Army.

Dubbed "The Top of the Rock" by American troops, the small post was among the most feared and disliked of all training areas due to high altitude and extreme weather conditions. It featured ranges for tanks, artillery and basic training facilities. Additionally, it was one of only a few training sites allowed by the German government to utilize CS gas in training.

American units stationed at Wildflecken include:

- 2/15th Infantry Battalion
- 1/68th Armor Battalion
- HHB 1st Battalion, 1st Air Defense Artillery Regiment (MIM-23 Hawk) from Butzbach to Wildflecken in May 1976. The Fire Distribution Section moved from Fulda at the same time. Established primitive Tac Site on hill top outside training center.
- 3rd Battalion, 52nd Air Defense Artillery Regiment. Only Headquarters & Headquarters Battery (HHB), Service Battery and B Battery were stationed at Wildflecken. A Battery was located in Bad Kissingen, C Battery in Fulda, and D Battery in Schweinfurt. The unit's mission was to provide air defense against a potential East Block attack of Germany during the Cold War using Improved-Hawk missiles.
- 108th Military Intelligence Battalion
- 48 Maintenance Company
- 536th Military Police Company
- 54th Combat Engineer Battalion
- 144th Ordnance Company
- 23rd Medical Detachment – outpatient care, first aid; dispensary of the 33rd Field Hospital, US Army Hospital Würzburg, Wuerzburg MEDDAC/DENTAC, Würzburg American Hospital; headquarters for the Wuerzburg Medical Service Area
- 2/11th Armored Cavalry Regiment. In early 1992, the squadron moved from Daley Barracks in Bad Kissingen to Wildflecken, where it remained until stood down in 1994.

The Wildflecken Kaserne was decommissioned by the US Army and transferred to Germany in 1994 after a drawdown that began in 1991.

Currently, it is home of the German Army Combat Simulation Center. The training area is primarily used by the German Infantry School.
