= Rudi Arnstadt =

East German border guard (1926–1962)

- Born: September 3, 1926; Erfurt, Thuringia, Weimar Germany
- Died: August 14, 1962 (aged 35); Wiesenfeld, East Germany
- Military career
- Allegiance: German Democratic Republic
- Branch/service: Grenztruppen
- Service years: 1949–1962
- Rank: Hauptmann

Rudi Arnstadt (3 September 1926 – 14 August 1962) was an East German border guard who died in an incident with West German border guards at the Inner German border on 14 August 1962. Arnstadt, a captain of the Border Troops of the German Democratic Republic, was shot and killed by Bundesgrenzschutz officer Hans Plüschke near Wiesenfeld during a shootout that occurred under unknown circumstances. Arnstadt's death caused an escalation of Cold War tensions.

In 1998, Hans Plüschke was found murdered near Wiesenfeld under similar circumstances to Arnstadt, leading to conspiracy theories in Germany.

== Border guard service ==
In June 1949, Arnstadt registered for service with the Volkspolizei, the police force of the Soviet Occupation Zone, becoming an Anwärter der VP (police cadet) with the Kasernierte Volkspolizei in Gotha. In March 1950, Arnstadt was appointed to the German Border Police (Deutsche Grenzpolizei) in Dermbach, patrolling the Inner German border with West Germany. In 1952, Arnstadt failed his first attempt to become an officer at the police school in Sondershausen. In 1953, his marriage ended in divorce, with his two children Veronika and Uwe staying with the mother, and remarried shortly after. In 1954, Arnstadt passed his officer training at Sondershausen and was appointed the rank of Unterleutnant, and the following year was promoted to lieutenant. Arnstadt functioned as a recruiter for the German Border Police until 1957 when he was appointed as a company commander of the 6th border company in Dermbach. Arnstadt was responsible for a section of the border at Wiesenfeld, a region of Bezirk Suhl in the Rhön Mountains at the westernmost point of the Warsaw Pact. Arnstadt's section contained the highly-strategic Fulda Gap, which aroused the special interest of NATO, and a short distance from the US Army's Observation Post Alpha. Arnstadt moved with his wife to Wiesenfeld and in April 1957 became an unofficial collaborator (Geheimer Informator) of the Ministry for State Security (Stasi) until this relationship was ended fourteen months later.

In 1961, the German Border Police was reformed into the Border Troops of the German Democratic Republic (Grenztruppen der DDR) and became a service branch of the National People's Army (Nationale Volksarmee, NVA), the armed forces of East Germany. Arnstadt and his wife moved into a new house in Wiesenfeld whose owner had been recently expelled by Aktion Kornblume (Operation Cornflower), a large-scale operation of the East German government to expel "politically unreliable" people from living near the Inner German border. Additionally, Arnstadt was promoted to captain, received good grades and been awarded several times, including the Medal for Exemplary Border Service.

== Death ==
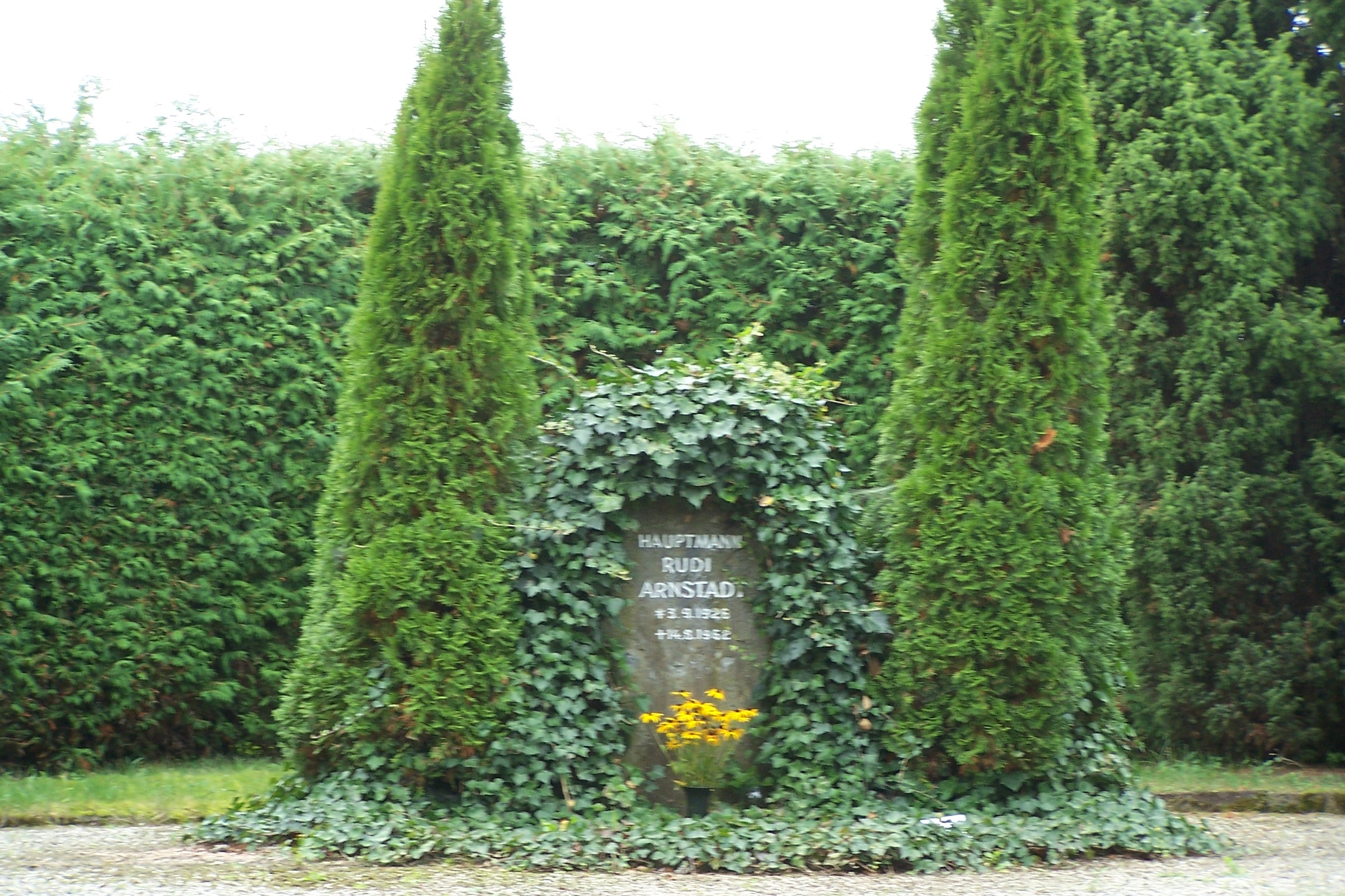
Memorial stone for Rudi Arnstadt in Wiesenfeld in September 2013.

On the morning of 14 August 1962, Arnstadt was killed by Hans Plüschke, a 23-year-old West German Bundesgrenzschutz border guard, in a shootout next to the border in his section at Wiesenfeld.

=== Investigation ===
At approximately 10:30 AM, while supervising the fence construction, Arnstadt and his assistant Karlheinz Roßner broke away from his men to closer inspect the border west of the fence. According to Roßner, they discovered a West German border guard patrolling at the border, whom Arnstadt accused of entering East German territory and warned him to leave. A few minutes later, Arnstadt and Roßner spotted three West German border guards approaching, but this time Arnstadt wanted to "arrest one of these provocateurs" and waited for them to get closer. Arnstadt surprised the West Germans, shouting "Stop! Stay up! Hands up!" aiming his pistol at them while Roßner issued a warning shot as ordered with his submachine gun at the same time. Reportedly, Plüschke then fired at them, shooting Arnstadt above his right eye and killing him instantly. Plüschke claimed that Arnstadt and Roßner had shot at him and his colleagues first and he returned fire at Arnstadt in self-defence.

=== Response ===
Arnstadt's death was the fourth death of an East German border guard to occur within a short period of time, which led to a very strained relationship between the two opposing sets of German border troops. The Cold War tensions between East Germany and West Germany were escalated by his death and resulted in a propaganda war between the two countries. East Germany portrayed Arnstadt as a defender of the territory of the German Democratic Republic, styled as a folk hero and had several public institutions named in his honor. Plüschke was sentenced to 25 years in prison in absentia for his murder by an East German court and his extradition was requested. According to West German officials, Plüschke was returning fire after his patrol was shot at.

== Hans Plüschke's murder ==
At 4 a.m. on March 15, 1998, the body of 59-year-old Hans Plüschke was found by a motorist on the Bundesstraße B84 between Rasdorf and Hünfeld, 70 metres (230 ft) from his vehicle. Plüschke's death prompted a number of conspiracy theories in Germany as he was fatally shot in his right eye, the same wound that had killed Arnstadt almost 36 years earlier, near to Wiesenfeld, and had not been robbed. Plüschke was only revealed to the public as Arnstadt's shooter in 1996, and rumors circulated that he had received death threats. In 1997, Plüschke had appeared in a television interview where he stated it was a "strange feeling to be told that you have killed a human being" and "I have become a victim of the Cold War." Rudi Arnstadt's son Uwe also brought no knowledge, testifying at a hearing that he had no desire for revenge against Plüschke. Police formed a Special Commission to investigate Plüschke's murder, but this was dissolved in the summer due to lack of leads and put on hiatus until any new information was discovered.

== Sources ==
- Osthessen-News.de: article on 40th anniversary of death of Rudi Arnstadt and the subsequent death of Plüschke (in German)

== See also ==
- List of unsolved murders (1900–1979)

== Books ==
- Frotscher, K., Liebig, H.: Opfer deutscher Teilung – Beim Grenzschutz getötet ISBN 3-89819-198-2
