= Geisa =

- Town
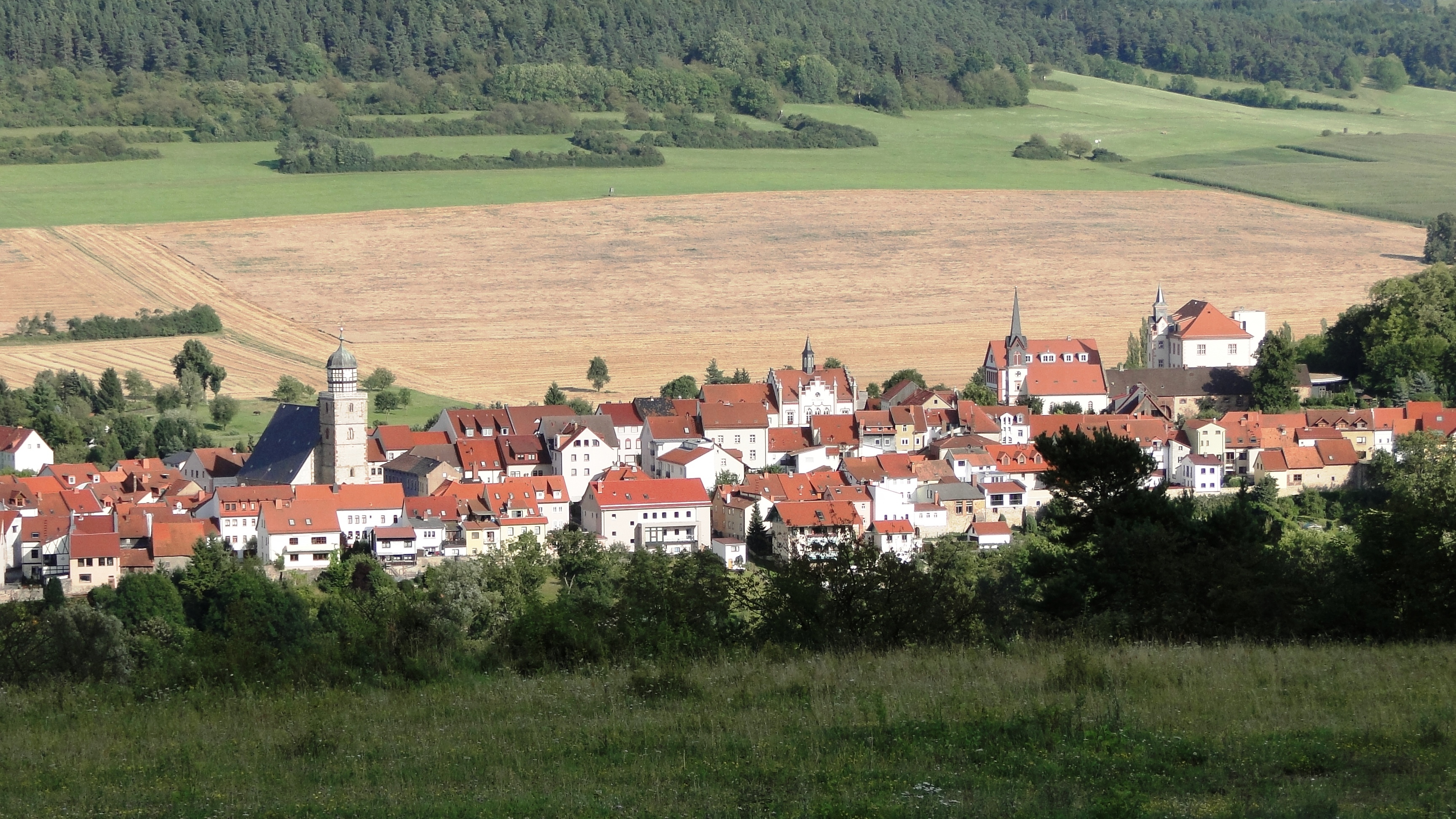

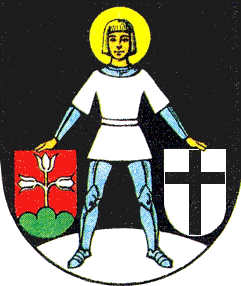
- Coat of arms

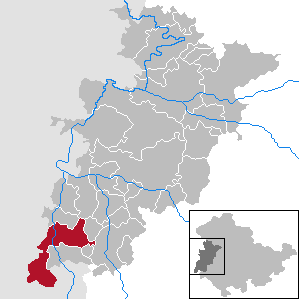
- Location of Geisa within Wartburgkreis district
- Interactive map of Geisa
- Location within Germany Location within Thuringia
- Coordinates: 50°43′N 09°58′E
- Country: Germany
- State: Thuringia
- District: Wartburgkreis

Government
  - Mayor (2020–26): Manuela Henkel

Area
  - Total: 71.94 km^{2} (27.78 sq mi)
- Elevation: 318 m (1,043 ft)

Population (2025-12-31)
  - Total: 4,708
  - Density: 65.44/km^{2} (169.5/sq mi)
- Time zone: UTC+01:00 (CET)
  - Summer (DST): UTC+02:00 (CEST)
- Postal codes: 36419
- Dialling codes: 036967
- Vehicle registration: WAK
- Website: www.geisa.de

Geisa (German pronunciation: [ˈɡaɪza]) is a town in the Wartburgkreis district, in Thuringia, Germany. It is situated in the Rhön Mountains, 26 km northeast of Fulda. The near border with Hesse was the border between West Germany and the GDR during the Cold War. Thus, Geisa was in the East German border restriction area of the former inner German border, which meant that until reunification access to the town was limited. The town is the westernmost municipality in what was formerly East Germany.

== Geography ==
Geisa is a town in the north of the Rhön Mountains in Thuringia. It is located on the Ulster River. The region is also referred to by the old name of Buchonia. The closest city is Fulda.

=== Subdivisions ===
The town is subdivided into the town Geisa proper and five official Ortsteile:

- Borsch
- Bremen
- Geismar/Spahl/Ketten/Apfelbach/Reinhards/Walkes
- Otzbach/Geblar
- Wiesenfeld

The Ortsteil Geismar/Spahl/Ketten/Apfelbach/Reinhards/Walkes corresponds with the territory of the former municipality Rockenstuhl.

== History ==
Geisa is mentioned first in a written document in 817 AD as a property of the Benedictine abbey of Fulda. Its oldest area of settlement is located on Gangolfiberg, which is the highest point of the town proper (at 322 m NN). This is also the location of the only surviving medieval place of jurisdiction in Thuringia, the so-called Zentgericht - dating from around the 11th century. A town wall, still largely extant today, was built around the year 1265. The deed of town ordinances and privileges was lost, the first notation as civitas is from 1302.

As an administration centre of the Abbey of Fulda, Geisa was a Catholic-dominated region. Athanasius Kircher was born on 2 May in either 1601 or 1602 in Geisa.

In 1802/03, in the German mediatisation, the ecclesial states including the Bishopric of Fulda were abolished. After the Congress of Vienna, Geisa was a part of the Grand Duchy of Saxe-Weimar-Eisenach until 1918.

Until 1990, the inner German border passed between Geisa and Rasdorf (Hesse). Geisa thus was in a restriction zone the East German authorities maintained on their side of the border and which limited access to the area after 1952. East Germans from outside the restriction zone had to apply for passes to enter it. West Germans were barred from visiting. Farmwork close to the border was allowed only once an official permit had been issued. Inhabitants of the restriction zone had to carry identification at all times. In the so-called Aktion Ungeziefer in the summer of 1952, the East German authorities selected 39 families from Geisa for forced resettlement. They were given one day's notice to have all their belongings ready for transport. 25 of the 39 families fled to West Germany in response.

There is now a memorial site (Haus auf der Grenze) with an exhibition on the history of the border. Just across the border, in what was previously West Germany, lies a former US observation camp - in military notation Point Alpha - that had sometimes been referred to as one of the "hottest spots of the Cold War". It was located in a very exposed position in the so-called Fulda gap, right in the path of a possible attack by the forces of the Warsaw Pact. Today the camp offers an exhibit on the presence of US armed forces and a memorial.

Since 2008, the headquarters of the Point Alpha Foundation have been located in the castle in Geisa, in addition to the municipal museum.

== Sights ==
Because of wars and fires (1858 in the upper town, 1883 in the lower town) in the past, only a modicum of historic buildings is present today.

- Schlossplatz - the square in front of the castle is formed by a number of commercial buildings, the Protestant church (1860) and what is today known as Schloss Geisa. The castle consists of two structures. The older is the Fürstliches Schloss, formerly the local courthouse and prison (built in 1540), which was turned into the seat of the local Amt (representative of the liege lord) by Placidus von Droste, Lord Abbot of Fulda, between 1678 and 1700. The younger is the Barockschloss (1712–1714) - a building by Johann Dientzenhofer - originally a hunting lodge for the Abbot (later Bishop) of Fulda.
- Stadtpfarrkirche - the Catholic Parish Church of St Philippus und Jakobus (St Philip and St James), which was built between 1489 and 1504. It is the only surviving Gothic church in the Geisa region. A rarity is the carillon, a special kind of 49 bronze bells on the church tower.
- Town hall - built in 1861 by Carl Heinrich Ferdinand Streichhan
- "Point Alpha" - a memorial located at the former inner German border.
- Gangolfikappelle - documented since at least 1461. It features a rare exterior pulpit from around 1600 as well as a number of Renaissance grave slabs.
- A well-preserved Jewish cemetery is on the outskirts of Geisa.

== Notable people ==
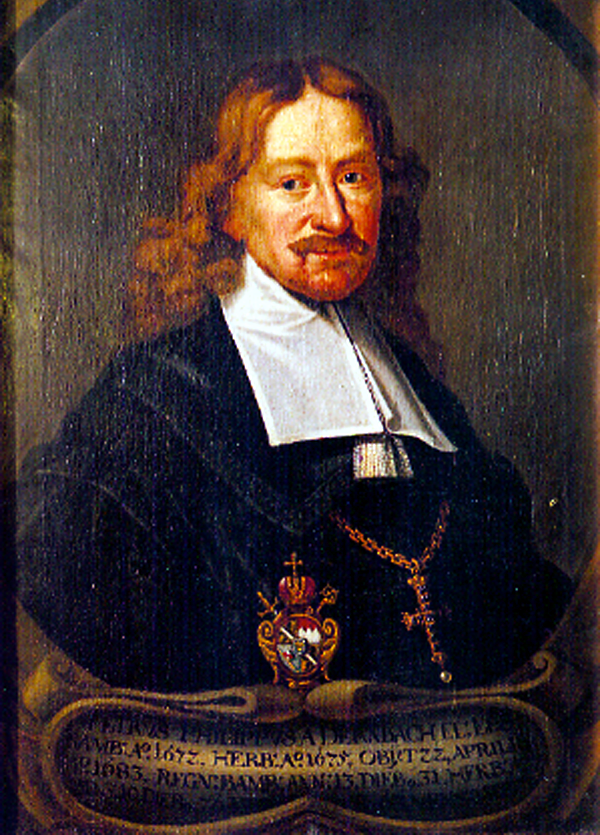
Peter Philipp von Dernbach around 1680

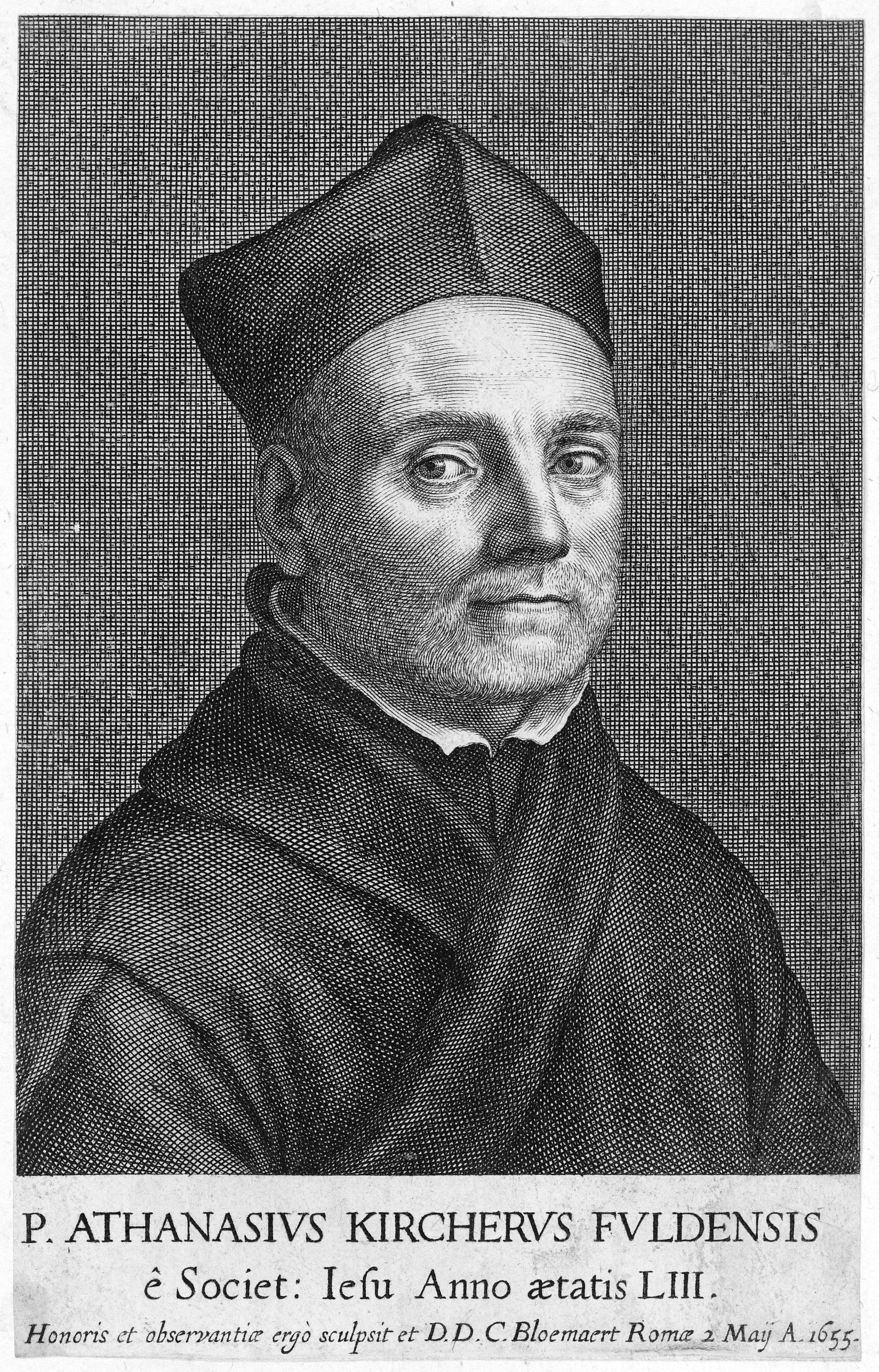
Athanasius Kircher

- Athanasius Kircher (1602–1680), German Jesuit scholar
- Peter Philipp von Dernbach (1619–1683), Prince-Bishop of the Roman Catholic Diocese of Bamberg and Roman Catholic Diocese of Würzburg
- Caesar Rüstow (1826-1866), Prussian officer and military writer, was killed in the war in 1866 at Geisa and buried in the city
- Adalbert Geheeb (1842–1909), pharmacist and moss explorer
- Moritz Goldschmidt (1863–1916), botanist
- Paul Geheeb (1870–1961), progressive educationalist
- Eugene Buechel (1874–1954), missionary, linguist and ethnologist
