= Elisabetta Fiorini Mazzanti =

Italian botanist and writer

- Born: 3 June 1799; Terracina, Italy
- Died: 23 April 1879 (aged 79); Rome
- Other name: Contessa Fiorini Mazzanti
- Occupation: botanist

Elisabetta Fiorini Mazzanti (3 June 1799 – 23 April 1879) was an Italian botanist and writer. She was known for her work in bryology and algae. In scientific literature, she is referred to by the abbreviation Fior.-Mazz.

== Early years ==
Elisabetta Fiorini Mazzanti, born in Terracina, Italy, in 1799, was the only daughter of Count Giuseppe and Teresa Scirocchi, but her mother died soon after she was born.

Elisabetta's father took charge of his only daughter's education providing her with a good education in history, geography, literature and art, as well as Latin, French, English and German. Already in her early youth, she developed an interest in botany, and one of her first teachers was Giambattista Brocchi (1772–1826). Through him, she came into contact with other scientists of the time, notably Giuseppe De Notaris (1805–1877) who would have an important impact throughout her life.

In 1829, she married the lawyer Luca Mazzanti, and they had a child. In 1842, the Contessa Fiorini-Mazzanti, as she was then known, lost her husband, father and only daughter within a year and became the sole heir to the large family estates. She adopted and educated the young Contessa Enrichetta Fiorini, niece of the late botanist Ernesto Mauri, who would become Fiorini Mazzanti's companion and nurse during her last years.

== Research ==
In 1831, inspired by De Notaris, Fiorini Mazzanti published her best-known work Specimen Bryologiae Romanae, with a second edition published ten years later in 1841. This publication was instrumental in encouraging the study of mosses throughout Italy and France. Subsequently, she dedicated her research almost exclusively to the study of freshwater algae, of which she had discovered several species. She also "maintained a lively relationship with peers and was also interested in the smaller achievements of others in the field of botany."

Fiorini Mazzanti's was remembered as "a diligent hunter of botanical finds." Her publications include a small paper of 1874 that describes a new moss Hypnum formianum, found in the province of Naples. Her last work, the Florula del Colosseo was published shortly before her death and described the flora around the Roman Colosseum. She was always anxious to increase her moss collection, and received samples from many foreign collectors, even receiving a last bedside gift from a German friend of mosses from Mauritania and Ceylon.

At the age of 74, Fiorini Mazzanti participated in the botanical congress of 1874 in Florence, where, although fatigued by the journey, she enjoyed the personal acquaintances of foreign botanists, particularly those from Germany.

Fiorini Mazzanti usually lived quietly in Rome but often left during the summer months to reside in her hometown, the ancient coastal city of Terracina, Italy.

== Death ==
She died in Rome 23 April 1879 and news of her death spread via the most important European botanical magazines and many dedications followed.

- Giuseppe Balsamo Crivelli (1800–1874) and Giuseppe De Notaris both dedicated their work to her on the mosses of the Lombard Alps.
- Several new species commemorated her work with names such as the moss Filotrichella Fiorini Mazzantiae.
- Camille Montagne (1784–1866) dedicated the genus Mazzantia in 1855.
- Adalbert Geheeb (1842–1909) pointed out that with her death "an era of Italian botany had ended."

== Selected academy memberships ==
Elisabetta Fiorini Mazzanti was active in several academic societies.

- Royal Academy of Sciences of Turin
- Brussels Academy of Horticulture
- Agricultural Academy of Pesaro
- Tiberina Academy of Rome
- Academy of Georgofili of Florence
- Pontifical Academy
- Academy of Sciences Leopoldina
- Academy of Lincei

== Works ==
Fiorini Mazzanti was a prolific botany writer with many scientific publications to her credit.

- Notizie sopra poche piante da aggiungersi al Prodromo della Fiera Romana. Qiorn. Arcadico. Rome 1823
- Appendice al Prodromo della Flora Romana.
- Specimen Bryologiae Romanae. Rome 1831, 1841.
- Sopra una nuova diatomea. Atti dell' Acc. dei Nuovi Lincei. 1856.
- Sopra due nuove alghe delle acque albule. Rome 1857.
- Sulla identità del Nostoc con il Collema. Rome 1857.
- Sunto di un rapporto del ch. sig. Montagne alla soc. imp. cent, di Agricoltura. Atti Acc. dei n. Lincei, 185
- De novis mycrophyceis. Atti Acc. dei n. Lincei, 1860.
- Rettificazione di una nuova diatomea. Atti Acc. dei n. Lincei, 1861.
- Oscillarina, delle miniere di Corneto. Commentario della Soc. critt. it. N. 3. Genua, 1862.
- Microfìce osservate nelle acque minerali di Terracina. Atti Acc. dei n. Lincei, 1863
- Osservazione sulla materia colorante della Calotrix, janthiphora e diagnosi di una nuova microfìcea. Atti Acc. dei n. Lincei, 1864.
- Sopra una nuova specie di almodictyon e aopra un singolare organiamo di alga unicellulare. Atti Acc. dei n. Lincei, 1865.
- Continuazione e fine delle Microficee delle acque minerali di Terracina. Atti Acc. dei n. Lincei, 1867.
- Sulla Cladophora viandrina del Kùtzing. Atti Acc. dei n. Lincei, 1868.
- Cenno sulla vegetazione della caduta delle Marmore in una rapida escursione di luglio. Atti Acc. dei n. Lincei, 1869.
- Nota critica sull anormalità di un organismo crittogamico. Atti Acc. dei n. Lincei, 1871.
- Sunto dell' opuaculo sulle ricerche anatomiche e fisioliche dei funghì dell' Ab. J. B. Carnoy. Atti Acc.dei n. Lincei, 1872
- Sopra due nuove specie crittogamiche. Atti Acc. dei n. Lìncei, 1874.
- Fiorala del Colosseo. Atti Acc. dei n. Lincei, An. 1875, 1876, 1877, 1878.
