= Fulda Gap (game) =

1977 Cold War board wargame

Box cover of SPI (North American) edition, 1977

Box cover of the Simpubs (UK) edition, 1977

Fulda Gap, subtitled "The First Battle of the Next War", is a board wargame published by Simulations Publications Inc. (SPI) in 1977 that simulates a hypothetical attack by Warsaw Pact forces against NATO defenders in West Germany using technology and tactics of the mid-1970s

== Description ==
Fulda Gap is a two-player game in which one player controls invading Warsaw Pact forces, and the other player controls the NATO defenders. The rules system is based upon Panzergruppe Guderian, published by SPI the previous year, and comes with Basic rules, for new players, and Advanced rules, to be used once both players are familiar with the game. The game references technology and tactics from the 1970s, with rules for field fortifications, attack helicopters, air power, airmobile operations, paratroops, electronic countermeasures (ECM), chemical warfare, and nuclear weapons.

=== Components ===
The game includes:

- 22" x 34" paper hex grid map scaled at 10 km (6 mi) per hex
- 400 double-sided die-cut counters
- 16-page rules booklet
- player charts and aids
- small six-sided die

=== Gameplay ===
The game uses an alternating "I Go, You Go" system. First the Warsaw Pact player completes the following phases:

- Initial Movement Phase
- Combat Phase
- Secondary Movement Phase
- Reorganization Phase.

Then the NATO player completes the same phases — this finishes one turn, which represents 24 hours in game time.

The Advanced game adds two new phases to the beginning of each player's turn:

- Nuclear Planning Phase
- Nuclear Strike Phase

In addition, every turn in the Advanced Game starts with a simultaneous "Joint Air Superiority Phase".

All units begin the game as "untried" units—their real combat strength is allocated randomly once the unit is engaged in combat for the first time.

=== Scenarios ===
The game comes with four scenarios:

- "Tripwire": The Warsaw Pact invades West Germany without warning (7 game turns)
- "Advanced Warning": NATO has limited time to make some defensive preparations (7 turns)
- "D + 7": Both armies have one week (7 turns) to prepare, before the 7-turn invasion begins (14 turns total)

=== Victory conditions ===
Both players accumulate victory points for destroying enemy units. The Warsaw Pact player also receives victory points for attaining certain geographical objectives.

== Publication history ==
Fulda Gap was designed by Jim Dunnigan, with graphic design by Redmond A. Simonsen, and was published by SPI in 1977 in both a bookshelf box and a "flatpack" box. In addition, Fulda Gap was simultaneously published in the UK by Simpubs using different box cover art.

Fulda Gap was a bestseller for SPI. Based on pre-orders alone, the game placed #1 on SPI's Top Ten Games list two months before it was even published. After publication, it stayed at #1 for the next two months, and remained in the Top Ten for the next year.

== Reception ==
In the 1977 book The Comprehensive Guide to Board Wargaming, Nicholas Palmer noted that "the game system is slightly crude, but excitement is guaranteed. One of the most successful modern-era games." In his 1980 sequel, The Best of Board Wargaming, Palmer added "Fulda Gap is one of the best operational designs of the last few years: bristling with technical innovations, yet fast-moving and packed with excitement." He concluded by giving this game an "excitement" grade of 100%, saying, "The design is ruthlessly blunt in several places [...] This combination of no-frills writing with so many exotic aspects of modern warfare accounts for the game's continued popularity."

In Issue 25 of the British wargaming magazine Perfidious Albion, Charles Vasey and Geoffrey Barnard discussed the game. Vasey called it "a classy piece of design work with interesting ideas and an exciting subject. The untried rule can be odd .. but I assume it's there for effect." Barnard replied, "It manages to mix a high degree of design detail into a very playable game ... if you want a game with lots of similarities to Panzergruppe Guderian but with a lot more detail and 'colour', you should have a look at Fulda Gap."

In Issue 13 of Phoenix, Donald Mack called the game "tense, absorbing and full of movement and cliff-hanger moments." Mack thought the game was tilted in favor of the Warsaw Pact, but noted that many of the NATO units "are stout defenders and the terrain favours the strategic defensive; however, defence must be of the sword, not the shield and here [the NATO player's] ability to strike and withdraw [...] will help."

In The Guide to Simulations/Games for Education and Training, Martin Campion noted with approval that "The rules reflect several aspects of warfare not usually dealt with in a wargame and do so without excessive difficulty." He used the concept of unit disengagement as an example, saying, "Disengagement is dealt with in an usually realistic fashion." He concluded, "The importance of supply and of organization, including organization by different nationalities, is made manifest."

== Awards ==
At the 1978 Origins Awards, Fulda Gap was a finalist for a Charles S. Roberts Award in the category "Best Strategic Game of 1977".

== Other reviews and commentary ==
- Strategy & Tactics #62
- Fire & Movement #9, #15 and #72
- The Wargamer Vol.1 #5 and #9
- Wargamer's Collector's Journal #4
