= Rockenstuhl =

- Municipality
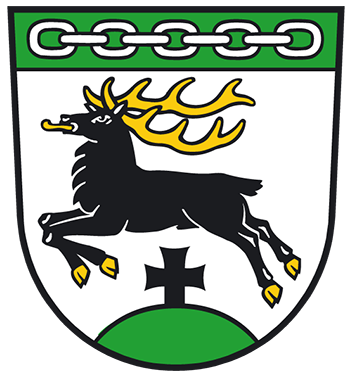
- Coat of arms
- Interactive map of Rockenstuhl
- Location within Germany Location within Thuringia
- Coordinates: 50°40′N 09°56′E
- Country: Germany
- State: Thuringia
- District: Wartburgkreis
- Disbanded: 2008-12-31

Area
  - Total: 30.39 km^{2} (11.73 sq mi)
- Elevation: 385 m (1,263 ft)

Population (2006-12-31)
  - Total: 1,347
  - Density: 44.32/km^{2} (114.8/sq mi)
- Time zone: UTC+01:00 (CET)
  - Summer (DST): UTC+02:00 (CEST)
- Postal codes: 36419
- Dialling codes: 036967
- Vehicle registration: WAK

Rockenstuhl is a former municipality in the Wartburgkreis district of Thuringia, Germany. It was created in March 1994 by the merger of the former municipalities Geismar, Ketten and Spahl. Since 31 December 2008, it is part of the town Geisa.
