= Observation Post Alpha =

Observation Post overlooking the inner German border

- Part of Inner German border
- Between Rasdorf, Hesse and Geisa, Thuringia in Germany.
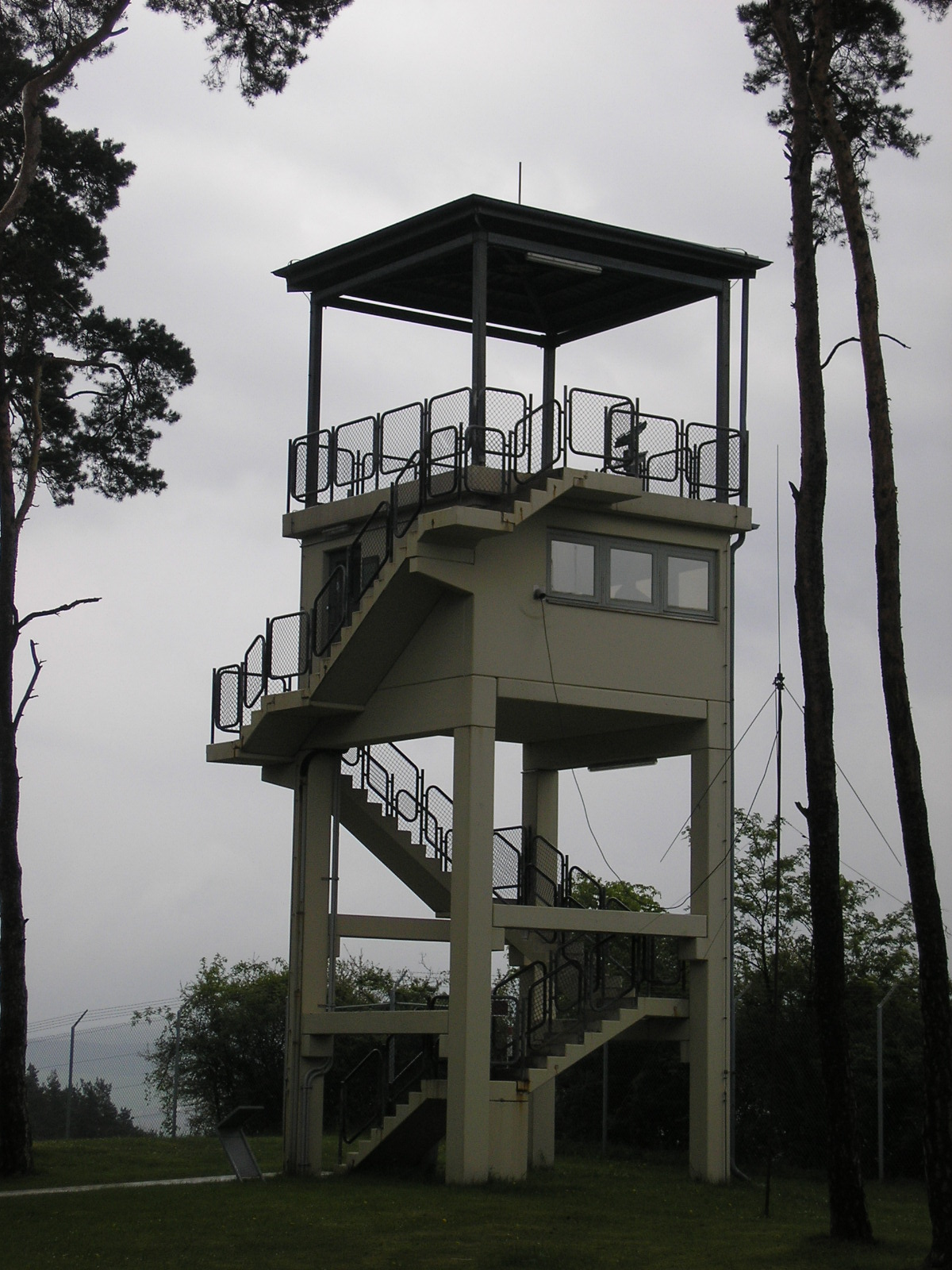
- NATO Observation Post Alpha, watchtower.

Site information
- Owner: Point Alpha Stiftung
- Open to the public: Yes

Location
- Location within Germany
- Coordinates: 50.7237°N 9.9323°E

Site history
- In use: mid-1960s to 1991

Observation Post Alpha, OP Alpha, or Point Alpha was a Cold War observation post between Rasdorf, Hesse, West Germany and Geisa, Thuringia, East Germany. The post overlooked part of the "Fulda Gap", which would have been an invasion route for Warsaw Pact forces had the Cold War erupted into actual warfare. It was abandoned by the military in 1991. Today, the "Point Alpha" memorial commemorates the observation point's four decades of existence. The memorial is dedicated to keeping it and a nearby section of the inner German border as reminders of the division of Germany and the confrontation between NATO and Warsaw Pact in the Cold War.

== Location ==
Observation Post Alpha is located on the Rasdorfer Berg between Rasdorf, Hesse and Geisa, Thuringia. It is a part of the Rhön hills. The Bundesstrasse 84 passing the post follows the historical route of the Via Regia from Fulda to Eisenach.

== Operations ==
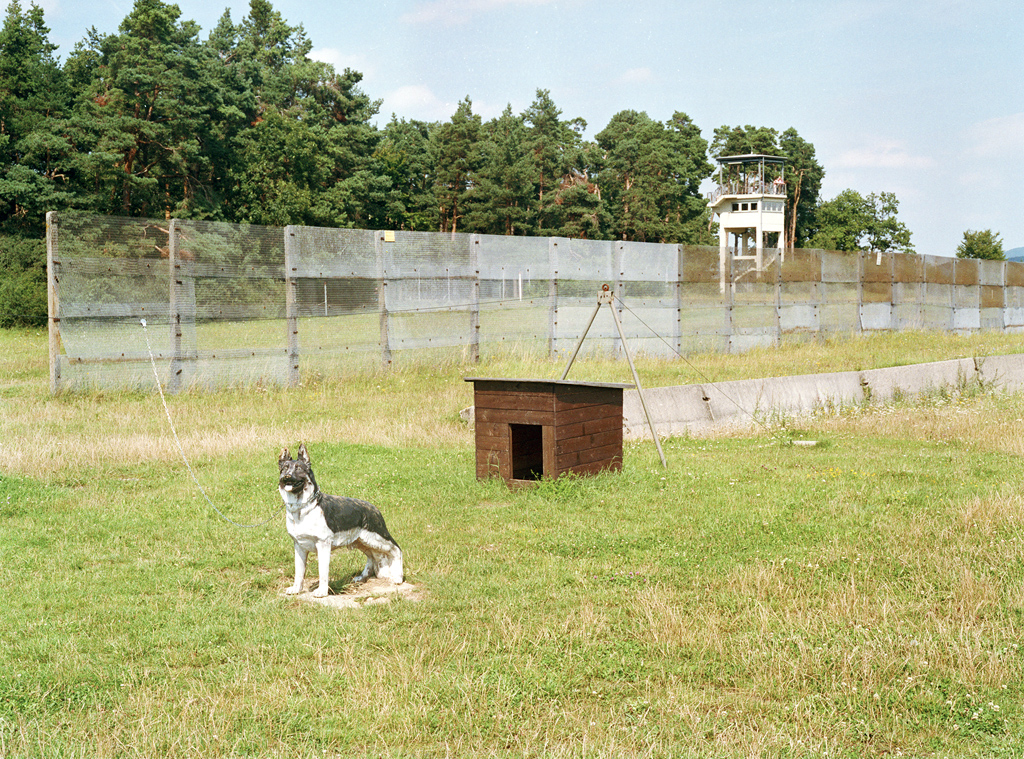
Reconstructed border fence and NATO observation tower, near Rasdorf, Germany.

Observation Post Alpha was one of four U.S. Army observation posts along the Hessian part of the inner German border. OP Alpha was manned by the 1st Squadron, 14th Armored Cavalry Regiment stationed in Fulda and re-flagged as the 11th Armored Cavalry Regiment in 1972. To the north were other observation points, OP Romeo, OP India, and OP Oscar, manned by the 3rd Squadron, stationed in Bad Hersfeld. The 2nd Squadron was stationed in Bad Kissingen, and guarded the border at OP Tennessee (OP Sierra) to the south. Jeeps and helicopters were used to patrol the areas in between, with occasional increased border activity with armored vehicles. OP Alpha fulfilled NATO defense reconnaissance south of the East German crossroads town of Vacha, regarding its view of Geisa, then the westernmost town of the Eastern Bloc; the Warsaw Pact had counterpart observation posts on their side of the border.

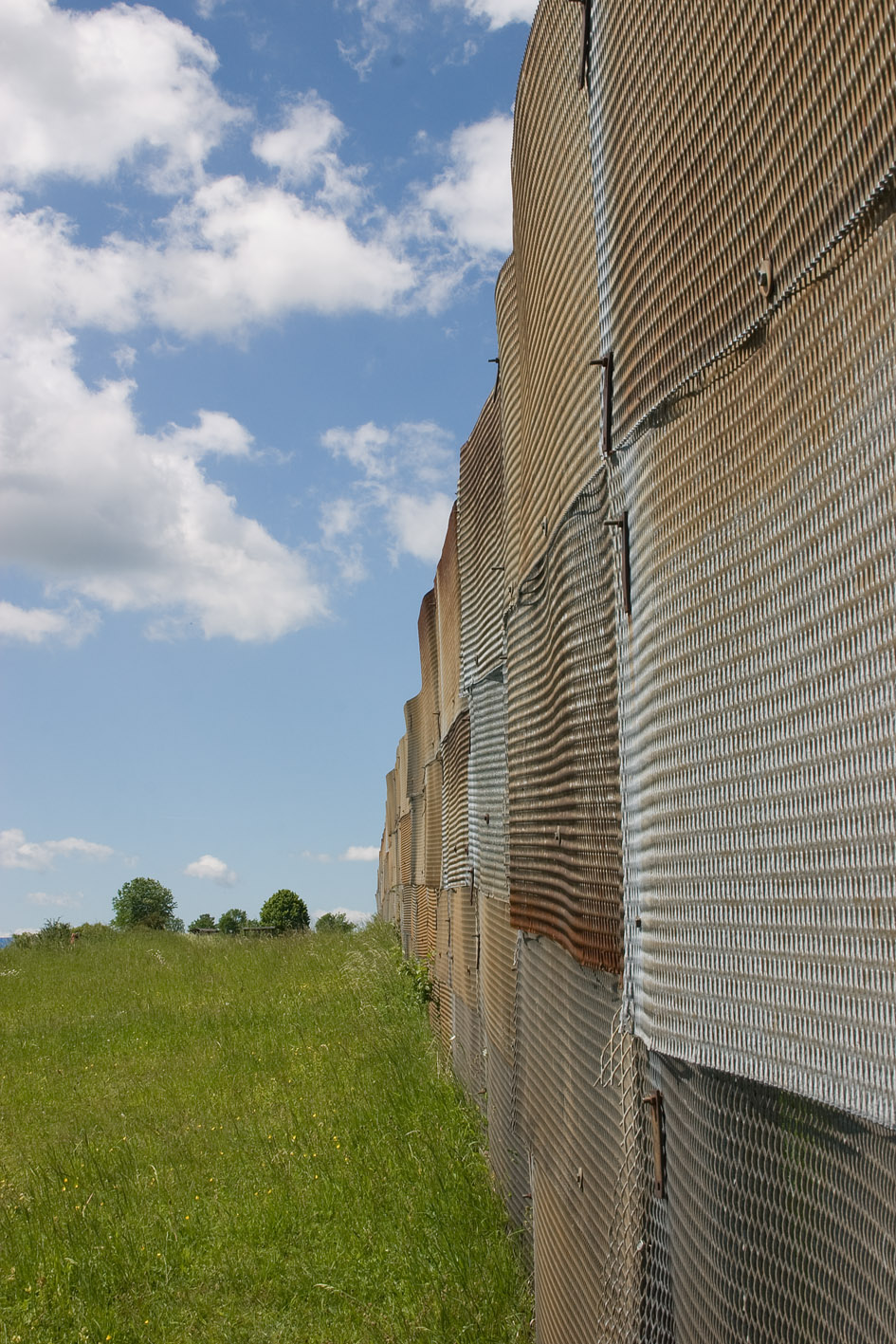
East German border fortification near OP Alpha

The OP overlooked part of the Fulda Gap from atop a 411-metre hill, lying in the centre of that section of the NATO defence line. The "Fulda Gap" was considered a strategic location by NATO for a Warsaw Pact invasion as it allowed the easiest access for Soviet tanks to the area around Frankfurt and then to the Rhine. The name OP Alpha dates to its being the first such point; geography also allowed monitoring Communist radio traffic. The use of the AN/PPS-5 ground surveillance radar set in the observation tower allowed 24-hour monitoring of activity on the roads leading into Geisa (the radar detected tanks as far away as 10 kilometers). At the first sign of an invasion the OP Alpha crew would have withdrawn, as the actual planned battlefields to meet a Warsaw Pact invasion lay a couple of kilometers to the west. The OP also served as a place to show the Inner German Border to visiting dignitaries, both from the U.S. and from Germany. Several American cabinet members, including in 1978 Secretary of State Cyrus R. Vance made it a stop on their itineraries when in Germany.

Under normal circumstances, approximately 40 soldiers were stationed for four to six weeks at OP Alpha. A typical manning of a border OP was one platoon of armored cavalry, with up to 10 armored vehicles. In crisis situations the garrison strength rose to 200 men.

Due to its exposed position, the OP was also sometimes referred to as "the hottest spot of the cold war". For a 1979 documentary made for the BBC Nuclear Nightmares, Peter Ustinov also visited OP Alpha which he referred to as "a hotspot of history".

== History ==
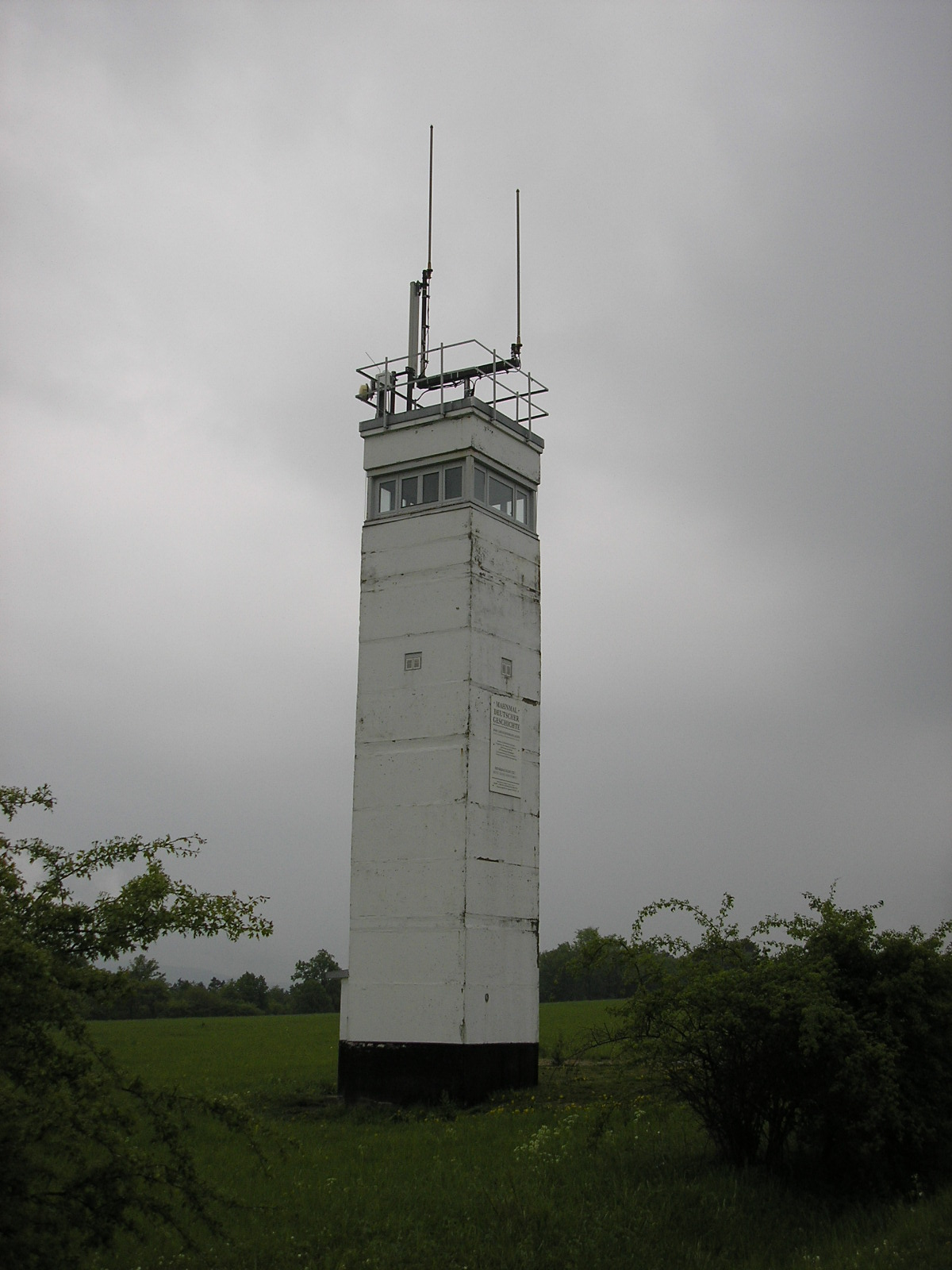
East German watchtower adjacent to OP Alpha

=== Before reunification ===
Originally, in the early 1960s, troops were housed on the Rasdorfer Berg in tents. Only after the area was officially handed over to the U.S. troops in 1965 did construction work begin. Huts were built and the post was surrounded by a fence.

On 14 August 1962, at a time when the East German authorities were strengthening the inner German border fortifications, a serious incident occurred near the location of OP Alpha. An East German border guard captain, Rudi Arnstadt, was on patrol with two other NVA soldiers. Under circumstances that remain unclear today, he opened fire at a group of four West German border policemen (BGS) who were on the other side of the border, observing the construction work. A BGS member returned fire and over a period of around 15 minutes more shots were exchanged. Arnstadt was killed by one of the first shots fired from the west. There never was a joint investigation of the incident. Arnstadt was declared a martyr and national hero in the GDR and given a state funeral at Erfurt. A West German court found that the BGS men had acted in self-defense. In 1998, the trooper who had shot Arnstadt, Hans Plüschke, now working as a taxi driver, was himself found shot dead on the Bundesstrasse 84 near Hünfeld. The bullet that killed Plüsche was placed at the exact place Arnstadt was hit. This murder remains unsolved.

In 1965, responsibility for border surveillance in the area was turned over from the German Bundesgrenzschutz (BGS) to the U.S. Army.

In 1968, the first observation tower made of wood was built (to be replaced in 1982 with a steel tower and again in 1985 with the current concrete structure). OP Alpha became a base of the U.S. 14th Armored Cavalry Regiment. In 1972, the U.S. 11th Armored Cavalry Regiment ("Blackhorse Regiment") assumed the post. During the 1970s the original wooden barracks were replaced with more solid buildings.

In late 1989, the closed border crossing between Geisa and Rasdorf was reopened, initially just for pedestrians. On 31 March 1990, the U.S. forces went on their last patrol and stopped their border observation. The road connecting Geisa and Rasdorf was reopened in December 1990. In 1991, the U.S. Army formally withdrew from the post following German reunification. OP Alpha was closed. The barracks in Fulda, Bad Hersfeld and Bad Kissingen were returned to the German government and the regiment returned to the U.S.

=== Post reunification ===
Following reunification, the post became the property of the Bundesvermögensverwaltung. An initial plan to turn it into a center for education was scuppered by the resistance of the Hessian government of the day, which insisted on "renaturalizing" it. OP Alpha thus was supposed to be removed along with the other remaining observation posts at the inner German border. However, for a while a use as accommodation for asylum-seekers was envisaged. This use of the facility lasted from 1991 to 1994/95. In early 1994, a citizens' initiative was formed to prevent the post's destruction and turn it into a memorial. Although the Thuringian authorities supported the idea, the Hessian government opposed it. In spring 1995, the last asylum-seekers left the facility, which by now was in a terrible state of repair and was scheduled to be demolished. An association (Grenzmuseum Rhön Point Alpha e.V.) was founded, seated in Geisa, to prevent this from happening. The Verein gained increasing political support for its cause and the site was declared a "listed monument" by the Hessian Denkmalbehörde, although work on demolishing it had already begun. The site was secured and in 1997 a caretaker was hired. To make use of public funds from Thuringia, a second association was set up in 1997, Mahn-, Gedenk- und Bildungsstätte Point Alpha e.V., with its seat at Geisa. The reconstructed border fortifications were completed in 1998 and a first permanent exhibition was opened in one of the camp huts. With the new Hessian state government of Roland Koch taking over in 1999, support from this direction increased. In 2000, two memorials at OP Alpha were inaugurated. One celebrates the American soldiers who risked becoming the first victims of a war with the Warsaw Pact. The other commemorates the victims of the division of Germany and the architects of reunification.

== Today ==
Today, "Point Alpha" is the name of a museum on the road between Geisa (Thuringia) and Rasdorf village (Hesse). The former OP now houses an exhibition on the presence of U.S. forces which includes several military vehicles. The museum complex covers not only the NATO observation post on the Hessian side, but also a strip of the (largely reconstructed) border protection systems of East Germany, including a visitors' center on the Thuringian side (Haus auf der Grenze, built 2002/2003), which features an exhibit on the inner German border. In 2011, the memorial was awarded the European Heritage Label.

Since 2005, there has been a "Point-Alpha-Preis", named after the installation. It is awarded to people who have made a positive contribution to German or European unity. In 2013, the prize went to former President of Poland, Lech Wałęsa. Prior recipients were Helmut Kohl, George H. W. Bush and Mikhail Gorbachev (in 2005), Václav Havel (in 2008), the citizens' movement in the GDR (in 2009), Helmut Schmidt in 2010 and Felipe Gonzalez in 2011.
