= Wiesenfeld, Eichsfeld =

Wiesenfeld
- Municipality
- Location of Wiesenfeld within Eichsfeld district
- Interactive map of Wiesenfeld
- Location within Germany Location within Thuringia
- Coordinates: 51°16′11″N 10°6′32″E
- Country: Germany
- State: Thuringia
- District: Eichsfeld
- Municipal assoc.: Ershausen/Geismar

Government
  - Mayor (2022–28): Udo Nolte

Area
  - Total: 7.61 km^{2} (2.94 sq mi)
- Elevation: 319 m (1,047 ft)

Population (2025-12-31)
  - Total: 229
  - Density: 30.1/km^{2} (77.9/sq mi)
- Time zone: UTC+01:00 (CET)
  - Summer (DST): UTC+02:00 (CEST)
- Postal codes: 37308
- Dialling codes: 036082
- Vehicle registration: EIC

Wiesenfeld is a municipality in the district of Eichsfeld in Thuringia, Germany.
