= Adalbert Geheeb =

German botanist (1842–1909)

Adalbert Geheeb (21 March 1842 in Geisa – 13 September 1909 in Konigsfelden, Brugg, Aargau) was a German botanist specializing in mosses. The son of a pharmacist, he studied natural history as a pastime, and published extensively.

In 1864-65 he studied pharmacy in Jena. Up until 1892, he served as a pharmacist in his hometown of Geisa, afterwards working as a private scholar in Freiburg im Breisgau. He was a corresponding member of the Royal Botanic Society of London and co-founder of the Rhön Club in Gersfeld.

In 1909 his herbarium contained 50,000 items representing 1300 species. He was the author of more than 50 scientific papers on mosses. The genus Geheebia is named after him, as are species with the epithet of geheebii, an example being Brachythecium geheebii.

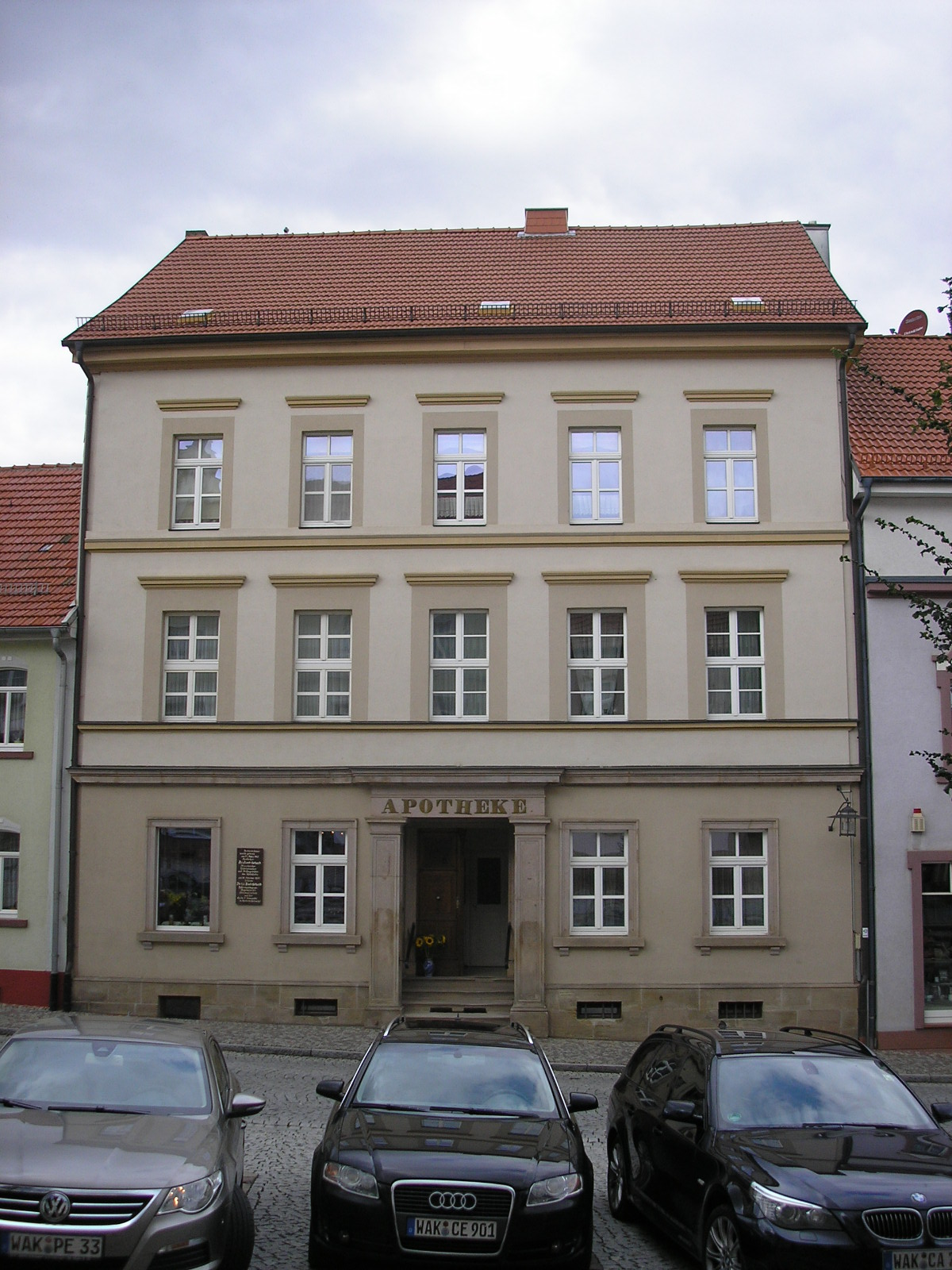
Apotheke Geheeb in Geisa

== Selected works ==
- Die Laubmoose des Cantons Aargau. Mit besonderer Berücksichtigung der geognostischen Verhältnisse und der Phanerogamen-flora, 1864 – Mosses of the Canton Aargau.
- Neue Beitrage zur Moosflora von Neu-Guinea, 1889 – New contributions involving mosses of New Guinea.
- Weitere Beiträge zur Moosflora von Neu-Guinea, 1898 – More contributions involving mosses of New Guinea.
- Bryologia atlantica : die Laubmoose der atlantischen Inseln (unter Ausschluss der europäischen und arktischen Gebiete), 1910 – "Bryologia atlantica", mosses from islands of the Atlantic.
