= Fulda Gap =

Strategically important area in the Cold War

Coordinates: 50.84°N 09.67°E

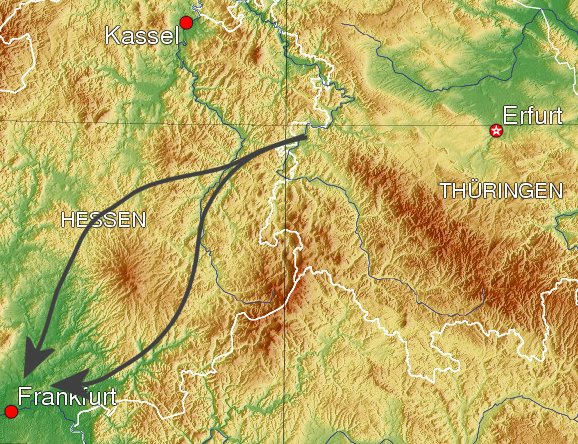
Theoretical attack routes through the Fulda Gap. The southern one through Fulda, the northern one through Alsfeld. The Vogelsberg Mountains rise between the two routes.

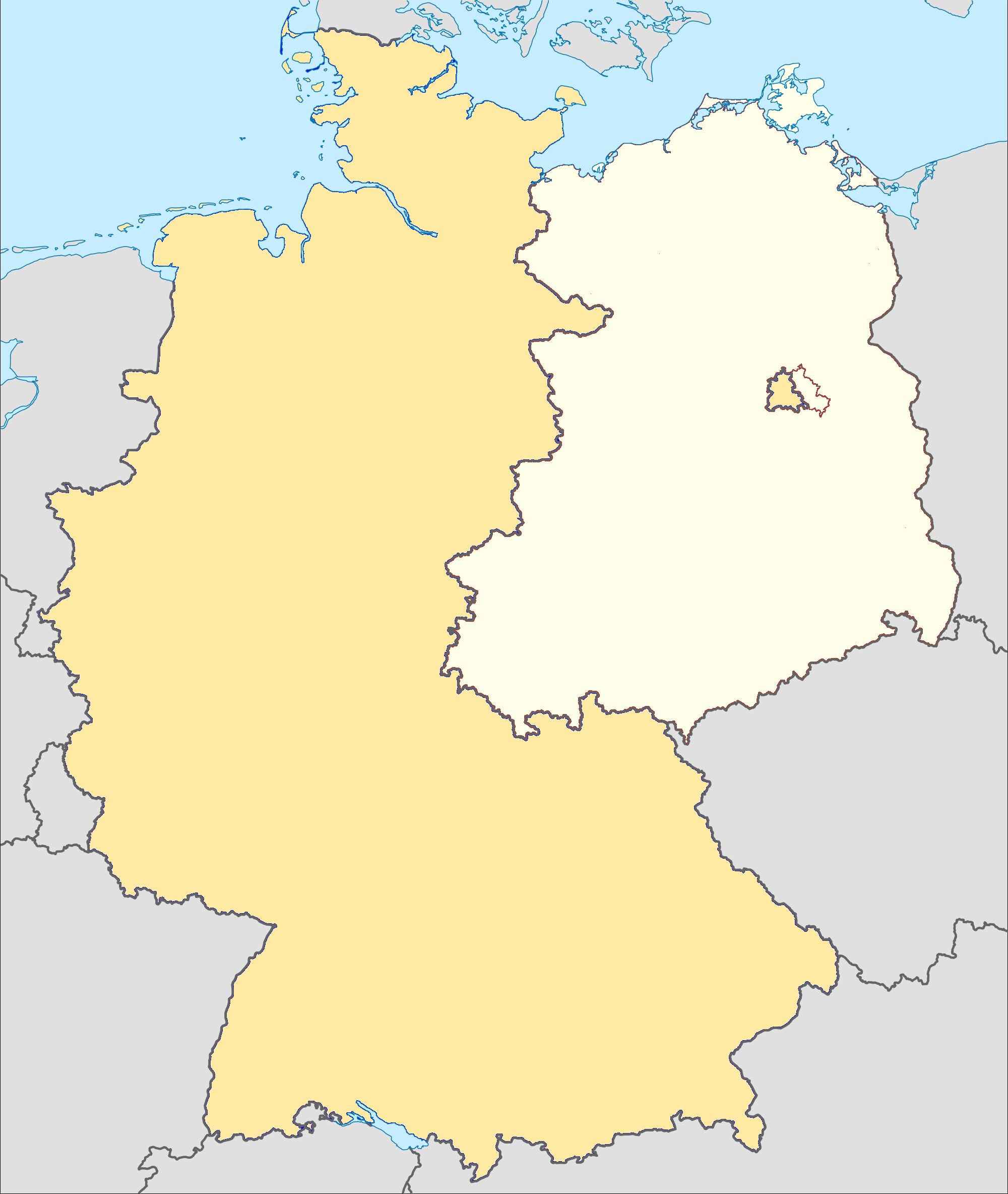
Fulda Gap deployments c. 1985
RHQ – Regt Hq, 1/11 – 1st Squadron / 11th ACR, CAS – aviation, CSS – support
Soviet units are 8th Guards Army, US units are V Corps
ACR = armored cavalry regiment (US) | CAS = close air support | CSS = combat service support | D= Division | G = Guards | MR = Motor Rifle | Regt Hq = regiment headquarters | RHQ = regional headquarters | T = Tank

The Fulda Gap (German: Fulda-Lücke), an area between the Hesse-Thuringian border, the former Inner German border, and Frankfurt am Main, contains two corridors of lowlands through which tanks might have driven in a surprise attack by the Soviets and their Warsaw Pact allies to gain crossings of the Rhine River. Named for the town of Fulda, the Fulda Gap became seen as strategically important during the Cold War of 1947–1991. The Fulda Gap roughly corresponds to the route along which Napoleon chose to withdraw his armies after defeat (16–19 October 1813) at the Battle of Leipzig. Napoleon succeeded in defeating a Bavarian-Austrian army under Wrede in the Battle of Hanau (30–31 October 1813) not far from Frankfurt. From there he escaped back to France.

From 1815, the area appeared of minimal strategic importance, as it lay deep within the borders of the German Confederation and from 1871 of the German Empire. German military planning presumed any war would be effectively lost, long before an enemy reached that far into the homeland. The route became important again at the end of World War II when the U.S. XII Corps used it in their advance eastward in late March and early April 1945. The U.S. advance had little consequence for Germany's strategic position, which was hopeless by that point, but it allowed the Americans to occupy vast swaths of territory which the Yalta Conference of February 1945 had assigned to the Soviet occupation zone. This did much to compel the Soviets to honor the Yalta Conference agreement, meaning that Western Allies got access to Berlin. In exchange, the U.S. Army withdrew in July 1945 from Thuringia and Saxony, to the line agreed upon in Yalta.

During the Cold War, the Fulda Gap offered one of the two obvious routes for a hypothetical Soviet tank attack on West Germany from Eastern Europe, especially from East Germany. The other route crossed the North German Plain. A third, less likely, route involved travelling up through the Danube River valley through neutral Austria. The concept of a major tank battle along the Fulda Gap became a predominant element of NATO war planning during the Cold War. With such an eventuality in mind, weapons were evolved such as nuclear tube and missile artillery, the nuclear recoilless gun/tactical launcher Davy Crockett, Special Atomic Demolition Munitions, the AH-64 Apache attack helicopter, and A-10 ground attack aircraft.

== Strategic location during the Cold War ==
The northern route through the Gap passes south of the Knüllgebirge and continues around the northern flank of the Vogelsberg Mountains. The narrower southern route passes through the Fliede and Kinzig Valleys, with the Vogelsberg to the north and the Rhön mountains and Spessart mountains to the south. More importantly, on emerging from the western exit of the Gap, encounters flat terrain from there to the river Rhine, which would have counted in favour of Soviet attempts to reach and cross the Rhine before NATO could prevent this. The intervening Main River would have been less of an obstacle.

The Fulda Gap route was less suitable for mechanized troop movement than the North German Plain, but offered an avenue of advance direct to Frankfurt am Main. Furthermore, the capital of the Federal Republic in Bonn was situated only 200 km to the west. A rapidly advancing Soviet or Warsaw Pact attack through the Fulda Gap, along the lines of Seven Days to the River Rhine, could have also potentially cut the territory of West Germany in two parts, making the long-term existence of a West German state untenable.

== Strategic responses to the geographic feature ==
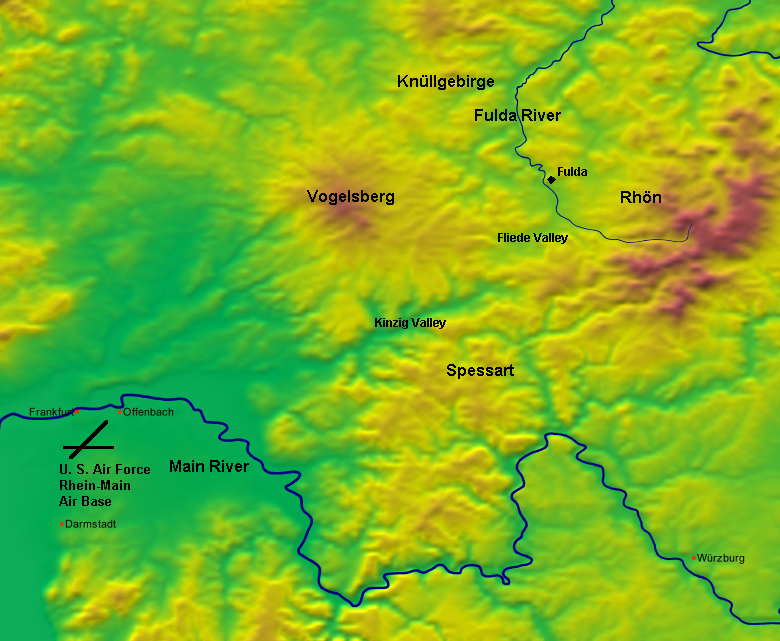
The topography around the Fulda Gap

Strategists on both sides of the Iron Curtain understood the Fulda Gap's importance, and accordingly allocated forces to defend and attack it. The defense of the Fulda Gap was a mission of the U.S. V Corps. The actual Inner German border in the Fulda Gap was guarded by reconnaissance forces, the identification and structure of which evolved over the years of the Cold War.

From June 1945 until July 1946, reconnaissance and security along the border between the U.S. and Soviet zones of occupation in Germany in the area north and south of Fulda was the mission of elements of the U.S. 3rd and 1st Infantry Divisions. By July 1946, the 1st, 3rd, and 14th Constabulary Regiments, arranged from north to south, had assumed responsibility for inter-zonal border security, in an area that later became famous as the Cold War Fulda Gap. The U.S. Constabulary as a headquarters was subsequently drawn down.

Individual constabulary regiments were retitled armored cavalry regiments. This coincided with the 1951 upgrade of the U.S. Army's mostly administrative and occupation responsibilities in Germany to a combat army, via the arrival of four combat divisions from the United States. Thus, from 1951 until 1972, the 14th Armored Cavalry Regiment (ACR) patrolled the Fulda Gap. After the return of the 11th Armored Cavalry Regiment from Vietnam in 1972, the 11th ACR relieved the 14th ACR, and took over the reconnaissance mission in the Fulda Gap until the end of the Cold War.

The mission of the armored cavalry (heavy, mechanized reconnaissance units equipped with tanks and other armored vehicles) in peacetime was to watch the East-West border for signs of pre-attack Soviet army movement. The armored cavalry's mission in a war, was to delay a Soviet attack until other units of the U.S. V Corps could be mobilized and deployed to defend the Fulda Gap.

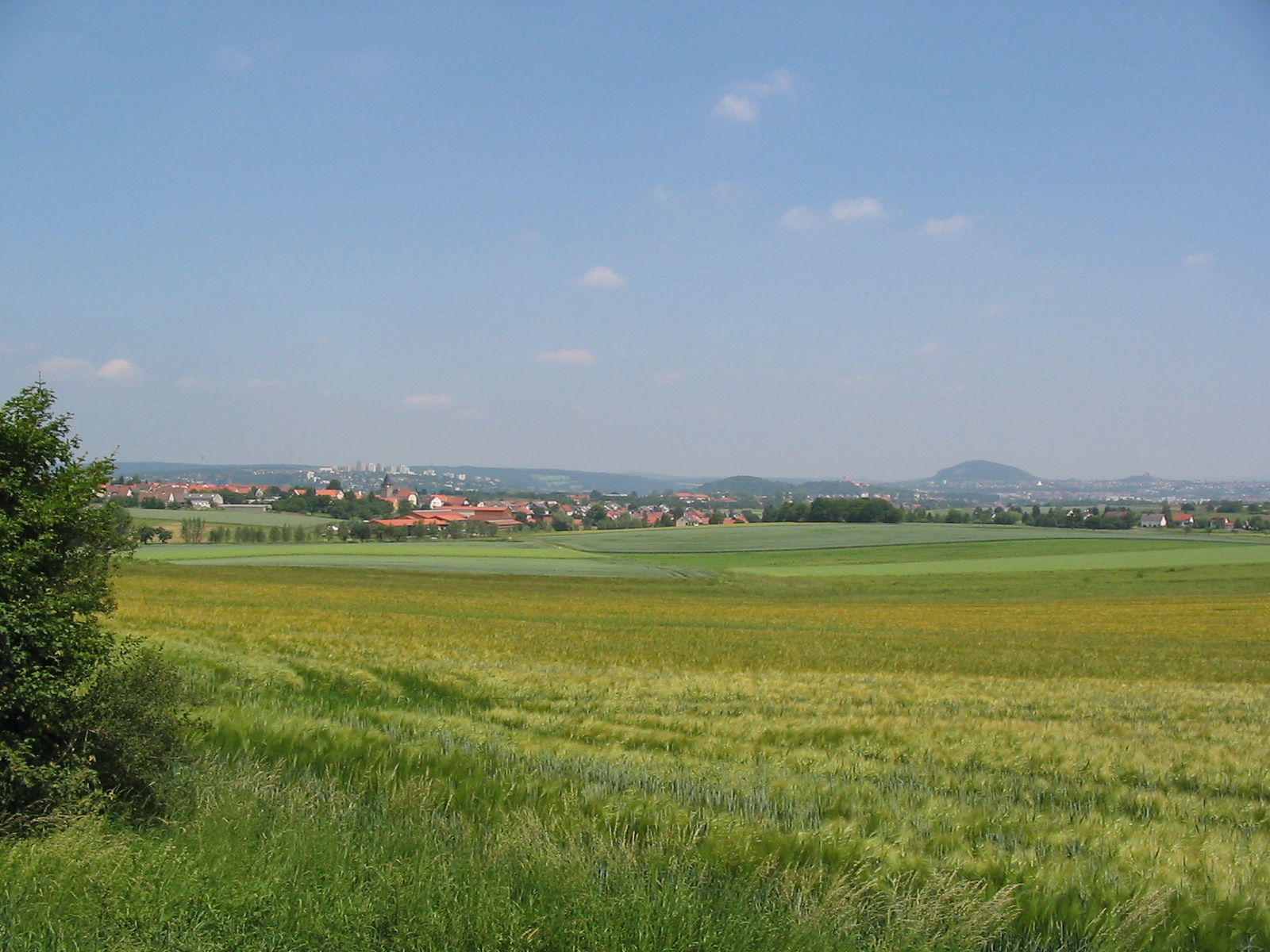
Terrain near the central German town of Fulda

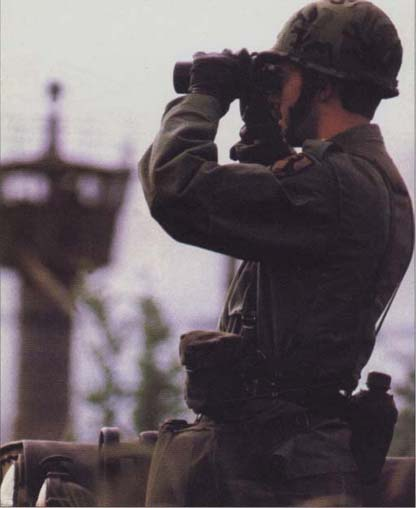
A soldier of the U.S. 11th Armored Cavalry Regiment on duty in the Fulda Gap during the Cold War

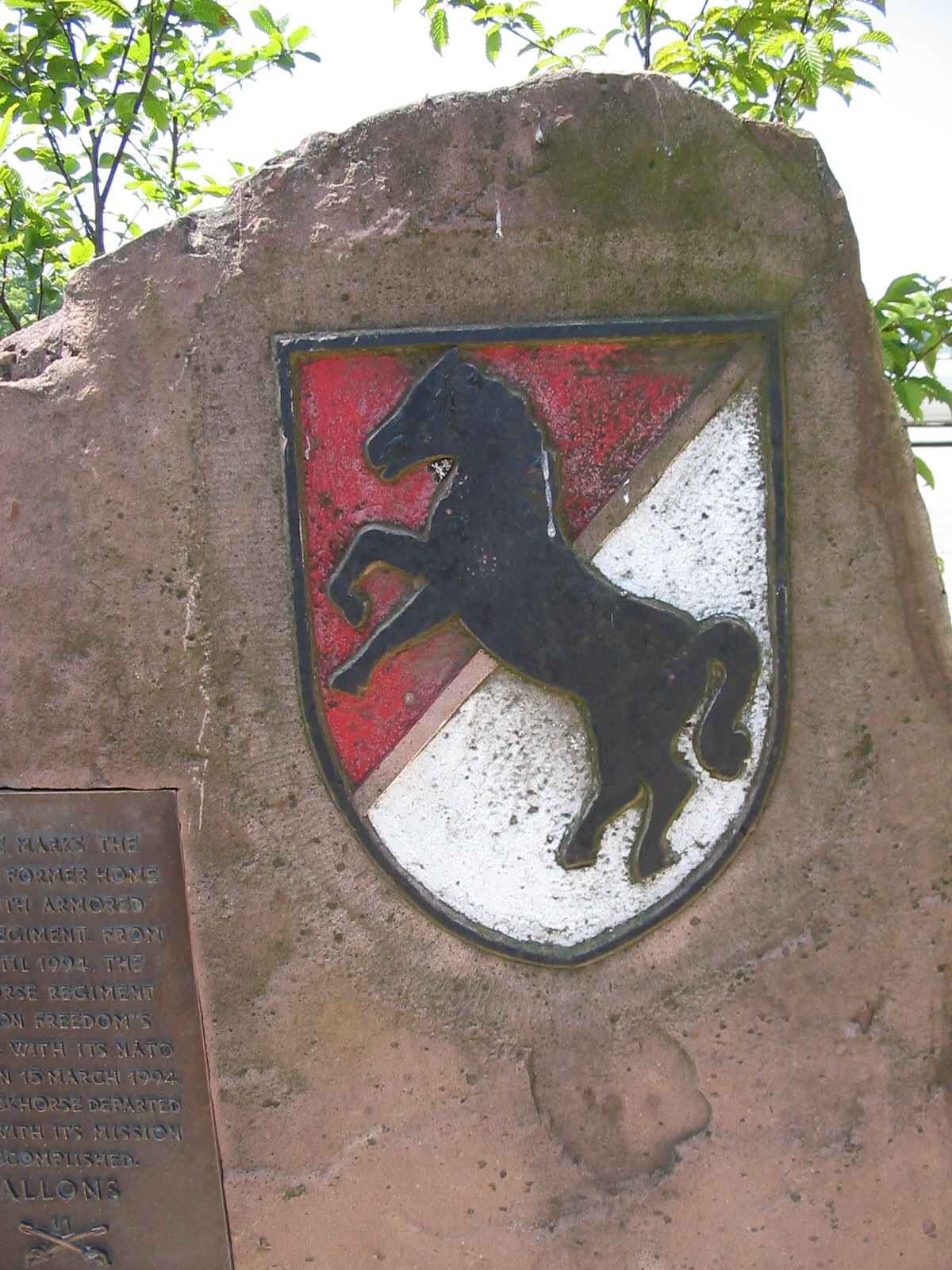
11th ACR memorial at the former Downs Barracks, Fulda, Germany

The armored cavalry would have also served as a screening force in continuous visual contact with the Warsaw Pact forces, reporting on their composition and activities, and forcing advancing Warsaw Pact forces to deploy while the cavalry fought delaying actions. In order to defend the Fulda Gap and stop a Warsaw Pact advance, as opposed to conducting screening and delaying actions, U.S. V Corps planned to move two divisions, one armored and one mechanized, forward from bases in the Frankfurt and Bad Kreuznach areas.

From 1947 until 1951, the 1st Infantry Division was the sole U.S. division in Germany, although the various Constabulary units taken together were equivalent in size to another division. U.S. Army forces in Germany were increased in 1951 as a result of President Truman's 10 December 1950 declaration of a national emergency as a result of the Korean War, with four divisions arriving from CONUS. This included the 4th Infantry Division, which was stationed in the Frankfurt area, and the 2nd Armored Division, which was located with its headquarters at Bad Kreuznach to the west of the Rhine River. Both of those were the divisions assigned to the newly activated V Corps. In May/June 1956, the 3rd Armored Division (3rd AD) arrived, and was stationed around Frankfurt. In December 1957, the 8th Infantry Division (Mechanized) (8th ID) arrived, and was stationed in the Bad Kreuznach area. The two replaced divisions returned to the United States.

The following is a summary of US Cold War history in Germany from the 1950s. US Forces were headquartered at Frankfurt and therefore had an orientation that included the Fulda Gap. The 19th Armored Cav Group activated at Frankfurt on 2 January 1953. On 1 October 1953, the 19th Armd Cav Gp was redesignated as the 19th Armor Group. On 1 July 1955, the 19th Armor Group was replaced by the 4th Armor Group.

The Seventh Army troop list of 30 June 1956 shows 4th Armor Group attached to V Corps, along with the U.S. divisions, 2d Armored Div, 3d Armored Div, and 10th Infantry Div. USAREUR Troop Lists dated 30 June 1958 show V Corps as containing 3rd Armored Div.(HQ Frankfurt), 8th Infantry Div. (HQ Bad Kreuznach), 4th Armor Group (HQ Frankfurt), and 3rd Infantry Div., which was headquartered at Würzburg.

After the 1963 ROAD reorganization, the 4th Armor Group was inactivated, and the 3rd Infantry Division headquartered at Würzburg was reassigned to VII Corps. The deployment of the 3rd Armored Division and the 8th Infantry Division to V Corps remained stable until the end of the Cold War. In practice, it was unknown how effective V Corps would have been in the event of war, due to the vast numbers of tanks and infantry that the Soviets were able to field. In response to the quantitative superiority of the Soviet forces, the U.S. deployed Atomic Demolition Mines for many years in the Fulda Gap.

In the early '60s, the Fulda Gap was also protected by V Corps Artillery units equipped with the medium-range MGM-5 Corporal guided missile capable of carrying nuclear warheads. In 1962, the more reliable solid fuel MGM-29 Sergeant missile was deployed and remained in use until 1973 when it was replaced by the MGM-52 Lance missile.

For many years, V Corps' principal adversary was the Soviet 8th Guards Army, which was to be followed by additional armies, including the four armored divisions and one mechanized infantry division of the Soviet 1st Guards Tank Army, making the Fulda Gap a key entry route for the Soviet Bloc to western Europe in any hypothetical battle in Cold War Europe. Both armies were well equipped, and held high-priority for receiving new equipment.

Beginning in 1975, the Soviet Union's strategy for attacking Western Europe involved the use of operational manoeuvre groups to outflank NATO defensive positions such as the Fulda Gap.

From 1976 to 1984, the 4th Brigade of the 4th Infantry Division was garrisoned in Wiesbaden and also subordinated to U.S. V Corps.

From 1979 onwards, the first V Corps unit detailed to reinforce the 11th Armored Cavalry Regiment in the Fulda Gap in the event of hostilities was the 8th Infantry Division's 1st Battalion, 68th Armored Regiment (1-68 Armor), stationed at Wildflecken to the south of the Gap. The mission of 1-68 Armor was to establish a defensive line across part of the Gap, providing a shield behind which other V Corps units could advance and defend. Also located in Wildflecken was the 108th Military Intelligence (MI) Btn, to which Delta Company Rangers was assigned. The Rangers' mission was to strike at the supply lines and command structures of any invading Soviet forces.

144th Ordnance Company was in charge of much of the ammunition slated for the 8th Infantry Division and the 3rd Armor Division, as well as operating ASP #3 in Wildflecken. 144th Ord. was also responsible for chemical and nuclear ammunition for the Fulda Gap sector, operating ASP #3 and multiple Forward Storage and Transportation Sites. The 54th Engineer Battalion (United States), also garrisoned at Wildflecken, was tasked with destroying critical bridges, roads, and other channels to impede any Soviet advance through the Fulda Gap, as well as provide critical engineering services to enable 1-68th Armor to ease the engagement of Soviet forces.

In September 1980, the 533rd Military Intelligence (MI) Battalion was reactivated in Frankfurt and assigned to the 3rd Armored Division. The 533rd MI Battalion deployed assets in the Fulda Gap to provide electronic warfare capability for the 3rd AD Commander. The missions of the MI battalion were to identify and target invading forces for artillery and air strikes, and to intrude on enemy radio networks using radio jamming and deceptive communications by Defense Language Institute trained Russian and German linguists. The 3rd Armored Division was reinforced with an organic attack helicopter wing, and was the first military unit to deploy the attack helicopter McDonnell Douglas, later Boeing, AH-64 Apache in 1987.

== See also ==
- Observation Post Alpha – Cold War observation post that overlooked a part of the Fulda Gap, now the site of a Cold War memorial
- Seven Days to the River Rhine
- Focșani Gate
- GIUK gap
- Suwałki Gap
- Belfort Gap
- Fulda Gap (board game)
