= Rasdorf =

Municipality in Landkreis Fulda in Hesse, Germany

- Municipality
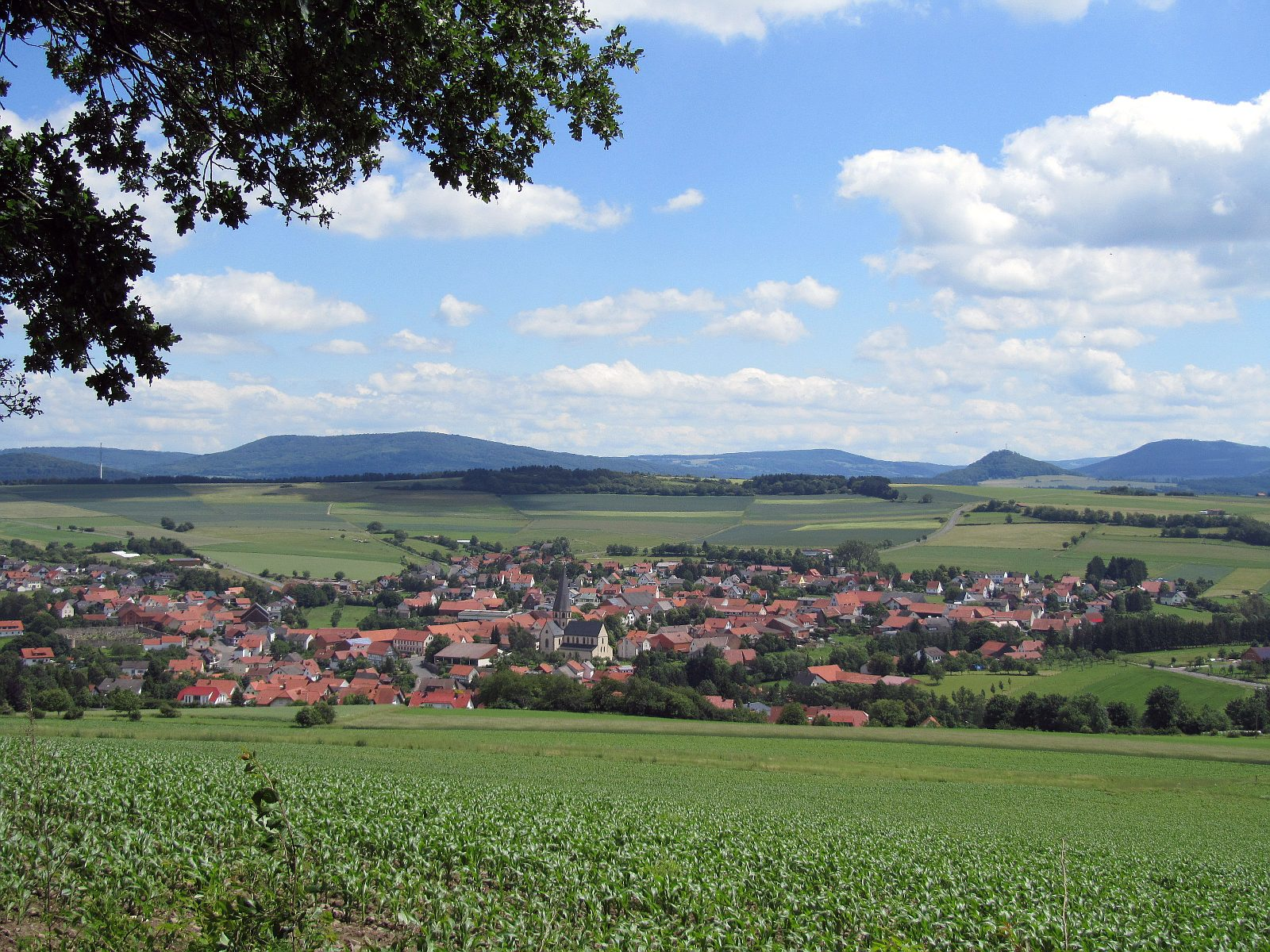
- View of Rasdorf from Gehilfersberg

- Coat of arms

- Location of Rasdorf within Fulda district
- Interactive map of Rasdorf
- Location within Germany Location within Hesse
- Coordinates: 50°43′N 09°54′E
- Country: Germany
- State: Hesse
- Admin. region: Kassel
- District: Fulda

Government
  - Mayor (2018–24): Jürgen Hahn

Area
  - Total: 30.07 km^{2} (11.61 sq mi)
- Elevation: 332 m (1,089 ft)

Population (2025-12-31)
  - Total: 1,549
  - Density: 51.51/km^{2} (133.4/sq mi)
- Time zone: UTC+01:00 (CET)
  - Summer (DST): UTC+02:00 (CEST)
- Postal codes: 36169
- Dialling codes: 06651
- Vehicle registration: FD
- Website: www.rasdorf.de

Rasdorf is a municipality in the district of Fulda, in Hesse, Germany.

== Geography ==
Rasdorf is situated within the Kuppenrhön-part of the Rhön hills, at the border of Hesse and Thuringia.

=== Neighbouring communities ===
Rasdorf borders in the north on the community of Eiterfeld (district of Fulda), in the east on the community of Buttlar, the town of Geisa and the community of Rockenstuhl (all three in the Thuringian Wartburg district), in the south on the community of Nüsttal, and in the west on the town of Hünfeld (both in the district of Fulda).

=== Administration ===
The districts of Rasdorf, Setzelbach and Grüsselbach form the municipality of Rasdorf.

== History ==
The Fulda monastery and the Rasdorf secondary monastery owe their existence to the missionary work of the Carolingians. Abbot Baugulf (779-802) received in return 781 "Haunfeld" (Hünfeld) as well as the village Rasdorf with all its corridors.

The village Rasdorf must have existed before 781. A secondary monastery Rasdorf is mentioned in 815. 32 to 34 monks and about 20 monastery students are documented in the 9th century in the secondary monastery Rasdorf. In the year 845 the abbot Rabanus from Fulda and King Ludwig the German met for reconciliation in Rasdorf. Rabanus had been on the "wrong" side in the dispute between King Lothar and his brothers Ludwig and Karl, namely on the Lothars side. When Ludwig became lord over the Eastern France, Rabanus withdrew and laid down his abbot's dignity. Thanks to the Rasdorf reconciliation, which took place on the king's initiative, Rabanus was appointed Archbishop of Mainz in 847. Rabanus stipulated that the word of God was to be preached in German, according to a provision of Charlemagne, "that the word of God is to be proclaimed to the people in their mother tongue.

The secondary monastery Rasdorf was converted into a collegiate monastery around 877.

On May 21, 977, Otto II visited the monastery in Fulda and received a delegation from the collegiate monastery in Rasdorf under the leadership of his chancellor Egbert.

The collegiate church in Rasdorf is considered one of the most architecturally significant village churches in Hesse.

Rasdorf attained significance due to its location on the historic trade route Via Regia (Frankfurt am Main - Eisenach - Leipzig).

Today's community of Rasdorf came into being in the course of the regional reform in Hesse on April 1, 1972, when the previously independent communities of Grüsselbach, Rasdorf and Setzelbach merged.

The Hessian Ministry of the Interior and Sport awarded it the designation Point-Alpha-Community with a certificate dated July 24, 2015

== Sights ==
- The memorial Point Alpha is located at the border of Hesse and Thuringia, which was the Inner German border until 1990. For decades, an observation post of the US army was located here. Today, the "Point Alpha Foundation" strives to maintain a section of the inner German border fortifications and the American observation post as a memorial. The intention is to remind visitors of the division of Germany and the confrontation between NATO and Warsaw Pact forces.
- The Rasdorf collegiate church was built in 831 by Rabanus Maurus, abbot of the Fulda monastery. In 1274 the church was rebuilt. In the process, a new church with a Gothic appearance was built, retaining the ground plan and using old Romanesque components. The Gothic columns are valuable in terms of art history. The eight columns with their capitals are the main sights in the collegiate church. Art historians suspect that these columns and capitals, which are highly significant in terms of art history, go back to Byzantine influence. Six columns in Greek style divide the basilica (nave and two side aisles). Two stocky columns (Romanesque) with rare animal capitals in the western part of the basilica are among the oldest parts of the church. The Romanesque baptismal font (12th century) reminds in its form of a representation of St. Boniface at a pagan baptism.
- A complex of a military cemetery (around 1200), which has been preserved until today, is surrounded by a high wall in an irregular square, the sides of which are between 55 and 67 m long and between 4 and 6 m high, with a thickness of about 0.80 m. It also has four corner towers with pointed hoods and embrasures, which provided protection for the population of Rasdorf in uncertain times. There is also a gatehouse and a covered battlement. Until 1827, the cruciform Romanesque parish church of St. Michael stood in the center. It was demolished after a sale. The cemetery cross is from the year 1751.
- Northwest of Rasdorf is the pilgrimage chapel "St. Maria und Vierzehn Nothelfer" on the Gehilfersberg. It was built around 1625 in place of a predecessor chapel, which was already mentioned in 1586, first to worship a miraculous cult image (St. Gehülf), then the 14 Nothelfer. In the 17th and 18th century the Gehilfersberg was the most important place of pilgrimage of the Hochstift Fulda. The chapel has a baroque interior decoration. After an arson in 1996 the chapel was completely destroyed, but was rebuilt true to the original and consecrated in May 1997. Seven wayside shrines from around 1750 lead up to the chapel, each of which shows two emergency helpers.

== See also ==
- Gehilfersberg
