= Rákóczi (disambiguation) =

Rákóczi may refer to:

- Rákóczi, a Hungarian noble family in the Kingdom of Hungary
- Rákóczi Association, a Budapest-based non-governmental organization
- Rákóczi Avenue, one of the arterial roads in Budapest, Hungary
- Rákóczi Bridge, a bridge in Budapest, Hungary
- Rákóczi Festival, the largest city festival in the German spa town of Bad Kissingen
- Rákóczi March, one of the unofficial state anthems of Hungary
- Rákóczi Museum, a historic house museum in Tekirdağ, northwestern Turkey
- Rákóczi Stadion, a multi-use stadium in Kaposvár, Hungary
- Rákóczi's War of Independence, the first significant attempt to topple the rule of the Habsburgs over Hungary
