= Wittelsbacher Tower (Bad Kissingen) =

Coordinates: 50°9′45″N 10°04′35″E

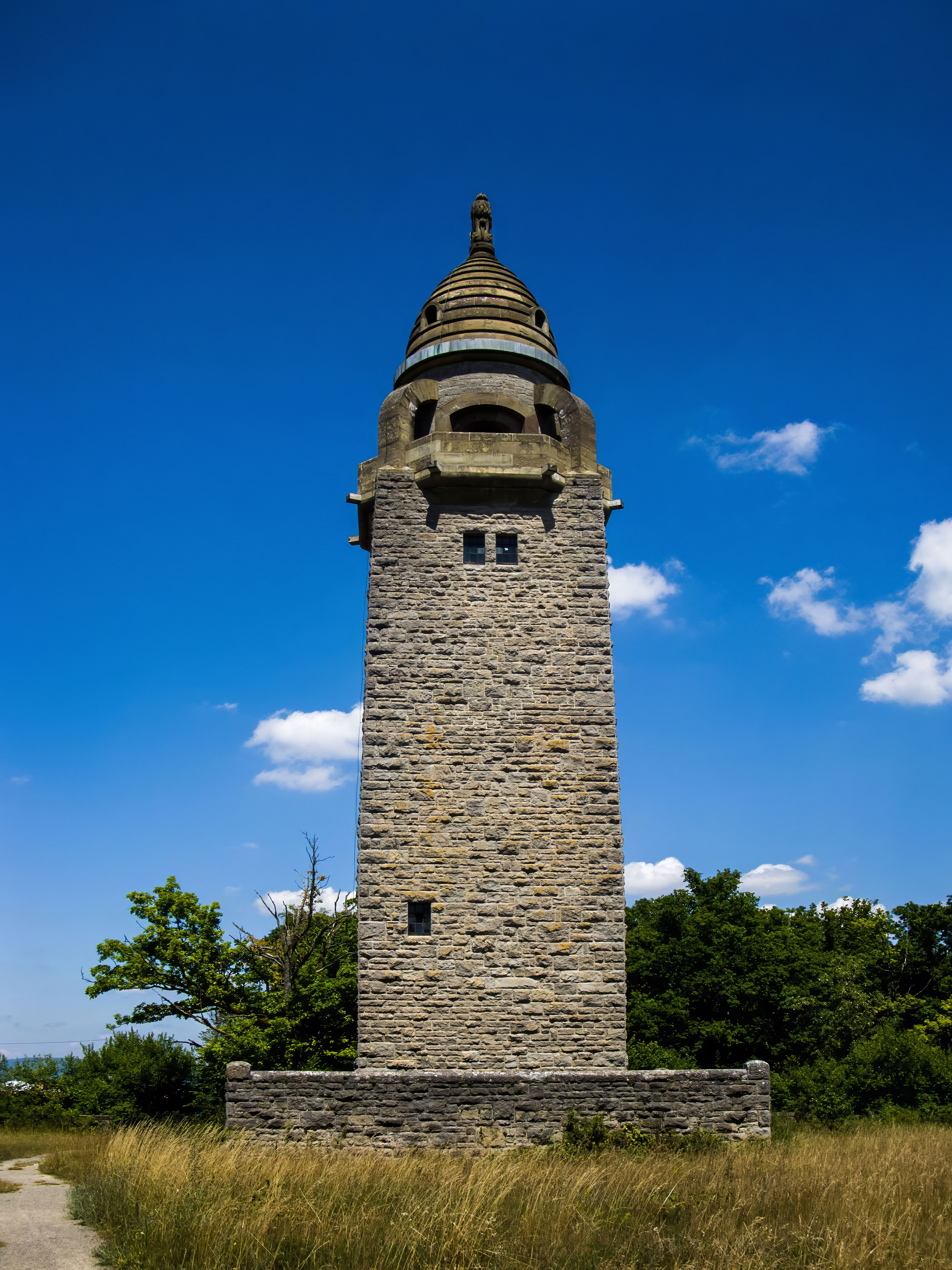
Wittelsbacher Tower

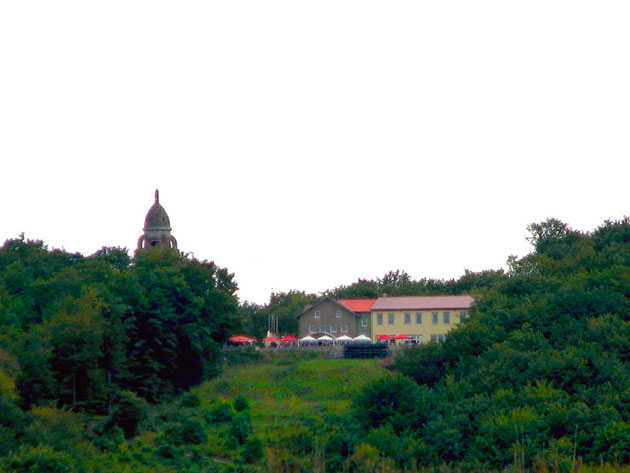
Wittelsbacher Tower (with a private brewery and gastronomy connected to it)

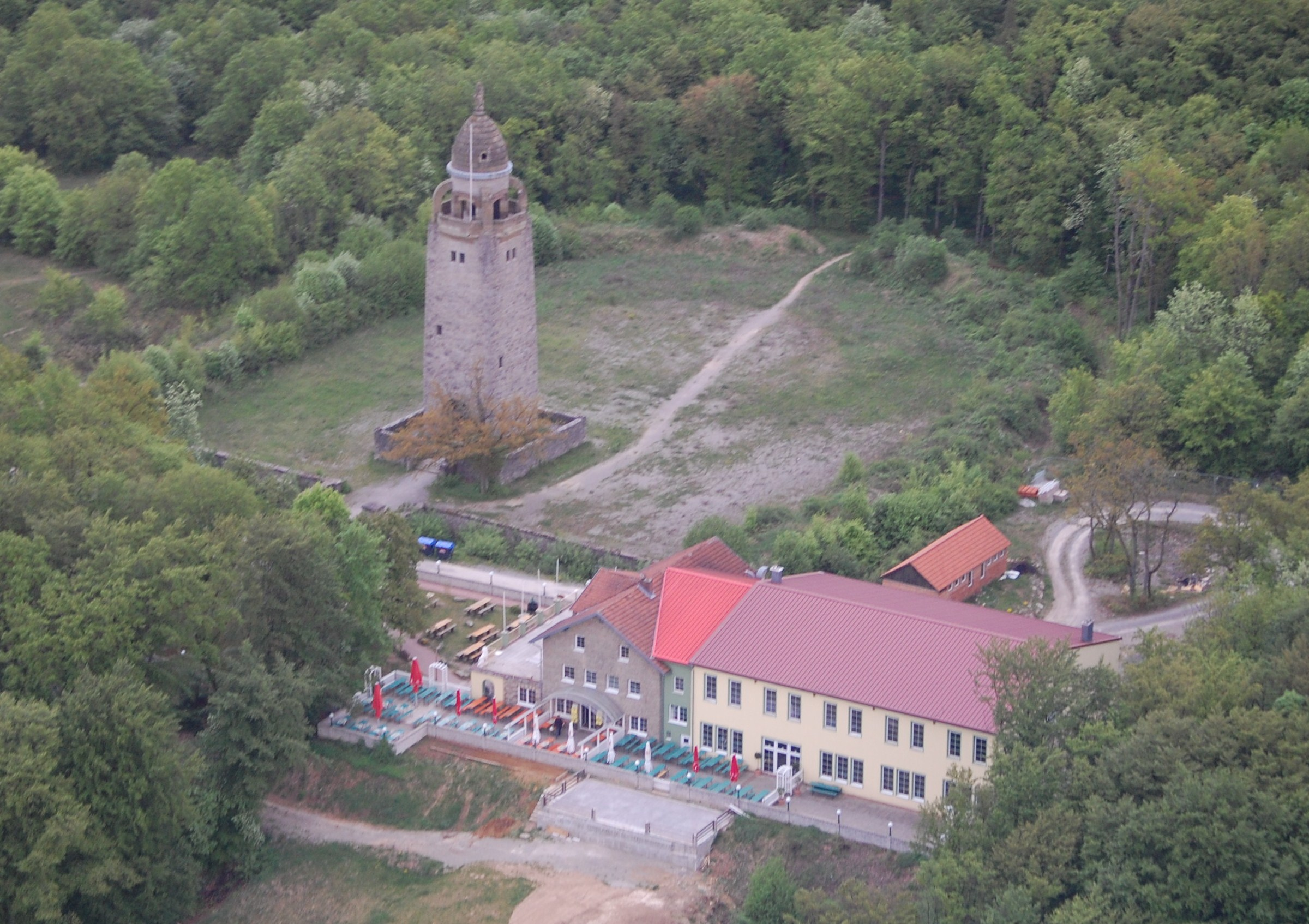
Wittelsbacher Tower (with a private brewery and gastronomy connected to it)

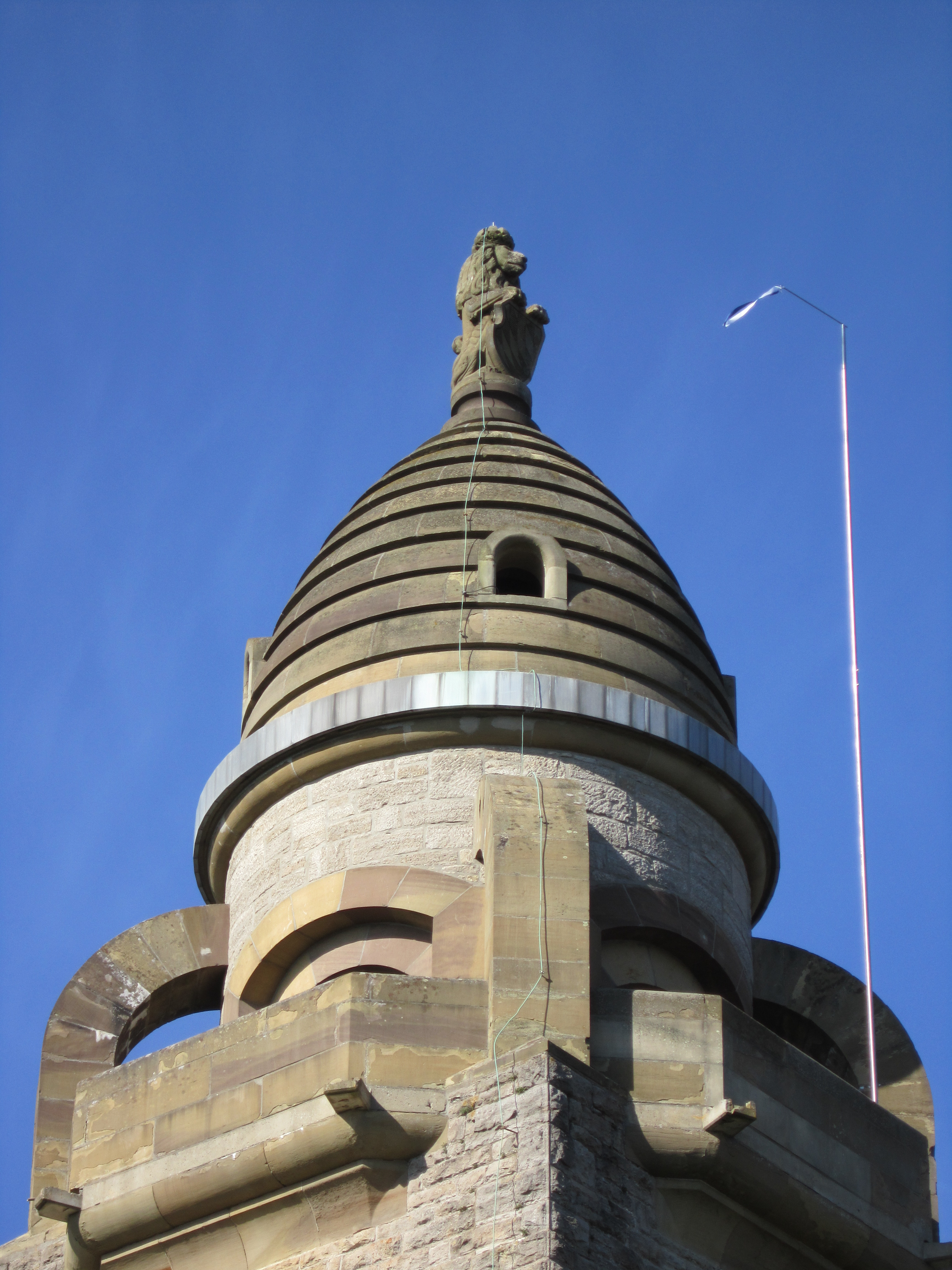
Top of the tower with a lion sculpture on it made by sculptor Valentin Weidner.

The Wittelsbacher Jubiläumsturm is a look-out at the "Scheinberg", a hill which is 400 metres high and located in Arnshausen, a quarter of the German spa town of Bad Kissingen. The tower belongs to the heritage registers of Bad Kissingen and has an entry in the List of Heritage Registers in Bavaria.

== History ==
In 1903, physician Dr. Wendelin Dietz inspired constructing a new look-out as the outlook from the top of the Ludwig Tower over Bad Kissingen turned out to be no longer sufficient. Dr. Dietz was the chairman of the Wittelsbacher Association, which was founded for the purpose of building the tower. The Bismarck Association was in favour of Bismarck and the Empire and competed in a certain way with the Wittelsbacher Association, which, even after the Unification of Germany, regarded Bavaria to be a sovereign kingdom and built the Bismarck Tower in Bad Kissingen in 1914.

The plans for the construction of the tower were made by Magistrate Council Carl Krampf; the lion sculpture on the top of the tower was designed by Valentin Weidner. The total costs amounted to 27,000 German gold marks.

As, in 1906, the Kingdom of Bavaria was facing its 100th anniversary and in 1880, already, the 700th anniversary of the House of Wittelsbach had taken place, it was decided to name the new tower the Wittelsbacher Jubilee Tower. The foundation stone was laid on 1 January 1906. The inauguration on 15 September 1907 was attended by, amongst others, Bavarian Prince Regent Luitpold and the District President of Lower Franconia and Aschaffenburg, Dr. von Müller.

In 1924, it was planned to install around the Tower a memorial for the Lower-Franconian victims of World War I. The foundation stone ceremony took place on 15 August 1925 under the participation of Bavarian Crown Prince Rupprecht; the extensive plans had to be stopped, however, due to the Great Depression.

The land purchased by Dr. Wendelin Dietz, where the tower was located, was first owned by Dr. Dietz's family and later by the State of Bavaria.

In the 1970s, the tower was closed to the public due to deterioration but restored by the State of Bavaria well-timed to the celebration of the 800th anniversary of the House of Wittelsbach.

At present, it is planned to establish the Erlebniswelt Saaletal (Adventurous World Saale Valley) with the Wittelsbacher Tower as its center.

== The building ==
The Wittelsbacher Jubilee Tower has a total height of 33 metres. An observation deck is located at a height of 25 metres and, thus, approximately 245 metres above the valley of the Franconian Saale which can be viewed from the tower. A sculpture of a lion wearing a crown stands on the top of the tower. The Tower is made of Muschelkalk limestone while the lion sculpture, the front gate, the balustrade, and cupola consist of green sandstone.

In 1930, a restaurant was established adjacent to the tower. The first restaurant built in block design, however, was destroyed in 1933, probably due to arson. It was replaced the same year by a solid building. The tower has later been extensively renovated several times. Further new structures including a private brewery and a hall have also been added.

== Outlook ==
The top of the tower allows an outlook over Bad Kissingen, the valley of the Franconian Saale as well as the Sodenberg near Hammelburg.
