= Center for Telemedicine =

German institution in the field of telemedicine

The Center for Telemedicine (ZTM), based in Bad Kissingen, is an institution in the field of telemedicine in Germany.

== History and structure ==
The ZTM was founded in 2010 as the Center for Telemedicine (Zentrum für Telemedizin e.V.). In 2013, ZTM Bad Kissingen GmbH was founded, which focuses on the development and implementation of telemedicine systems. In 2021, the Innovative Healthcare Foundation was established to promote educational initiatives in the healthcare sector. These three organizations work closely together to advance innovations in the field of telemedicine.

== Tasks and projects ==
The ZTM develops and operates nationwide telemedicine systems for digital networking in the healthcare sector. Its main tasks include developing new solutions, advising healthcare stakeholders, and providing information on telemedicine and e-health.

=== Important products ===
- NIDAklinik: A system for telemedical pre-registration of emergency medical services patients, used in over 500 hospitals nationwide.
- Copilot: A digital nursing assistance system that ensures safety and comfort in assisted living facilities in approximately 1,150 apartments across Germany.
- Curafida: An e-health platform that supports everyday medical and therapeutic practices in over 100 facilities nationwide.
- MIA: A system for telemedicine-assisted home visits, used in approximately 60 healthcare facilities.
- Buddy: A customizable AI chatbot for medical and healthcare applications to support patients, professionals, and organizations.

In addition, the ZTM is involved in projects such as “MS bewegt”, which was launched together with a health insurance company and the Multiple Sclerosis Support Group (AMSEL) to improve the mobility of MS patients through digital solutions.

== Recognition and promotion ==
Since its founding, the ZTM has received institutional funding from the Bavarian State Ministry of Health and Care. In 2024 alone, the association received approximately €607,500 to support its projects.

The ZTM has received numerous awards for its innovative approaches. For example, it received the Karl Storz Telemedicine Award for the "Tele-View for Refugees" project, which improves medical care for refugees through telemedicine solutions.
