= Bismarck Monument (Bad Kissingen) =

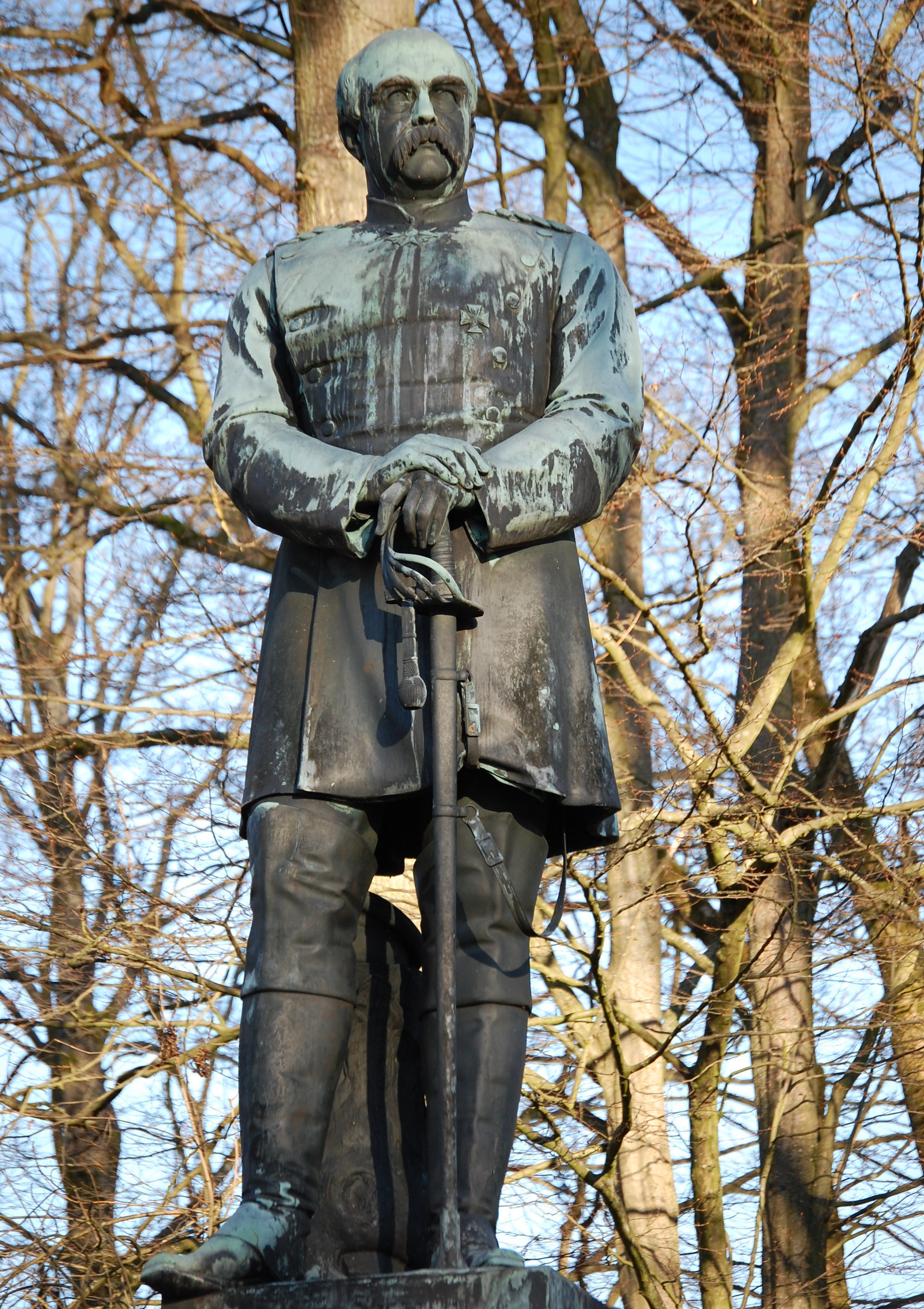
- Bismarck's monument at Bad Kissingen
- 50°12′53″N 10°04′16″E
- Location: Bad Kissingen
- Designer: Heinrich Manger
- Type: Monument
- Material: Bronze
- Beginning date: 1877
- Opening date: Sunday 29 April 1877
- Restored date: 1915
- Dedicated to: Otto von Bismarck

The Bismarck Monument in Bad Kissingen is located in Hausen (a quarter of the German spa town, Bad Kissingen), which Chancellor Otto von Bismarck visited 14 times to "take the cure" between 1876 and 1893. The monument was built in 1877, during his lifetime. It was the first statue to be erected in Bismarck's honour.

== History ==
In 1877, the Committee for the Erection of a Statue of the German Chancellor Bismarck in Kissingen (Comité für die Aufstellung einer Statue des deutschen Reichskanzlers Fürst Bismarck in Kissingen), founded in 1875, commissioned the artist, Heinrich Manger, to create a Bismarck monument. The erection of a statue to a living person required the permission of the Bavarian king. In giving his approval, King Ludwig II of Bavaria, directed that the monument should not be located at the spot where an assassination attempt on Bismarck had been carried out in 1874, but rather near the Untere Saline ("Lower Saltworks") on the Franconian Saale river, where Bismarck had relaxed during his cures. The majority of the cost of the statue, amounting to 7,800 Mark, was covered by contributions collected by spa guests.

The monument's unveiling, on Sunday 29 April 1877 at 10 o'clock, was covered in detail by the local newspaper, the Saale-Zeitung. Chancellor Bismarck expressed his gratitude in a telegramme during the formal dinner at the Englischer Hof, during which master builder, Manger, Privy Councillor, Dr. Stöhr, and the Lord Mayor, Dr. Full, gave speeches honouring Emperor William I. Nevertheless, Bismarck probably never saw the monument himself because, as he said in a speech on 28 November 1881, he would be highly embarrassed to pass by his own statue. In addition, he said it would have disturbed him "to stand next to himself like a fossil".

The monument, which inspired the design of the Bismarck Monument in Cologne, amongst others, had to be galvanised with a layer of bronze for reasons of durability shortly before Bismarck's 100th anniversary in 1915. This was carried out by the Württembergische Metallwarenfabrik in Geislingen an der Steige.

== See also ==
- Bismarck Tower (Bad Kissingen)
