= Rákóczi Festival =

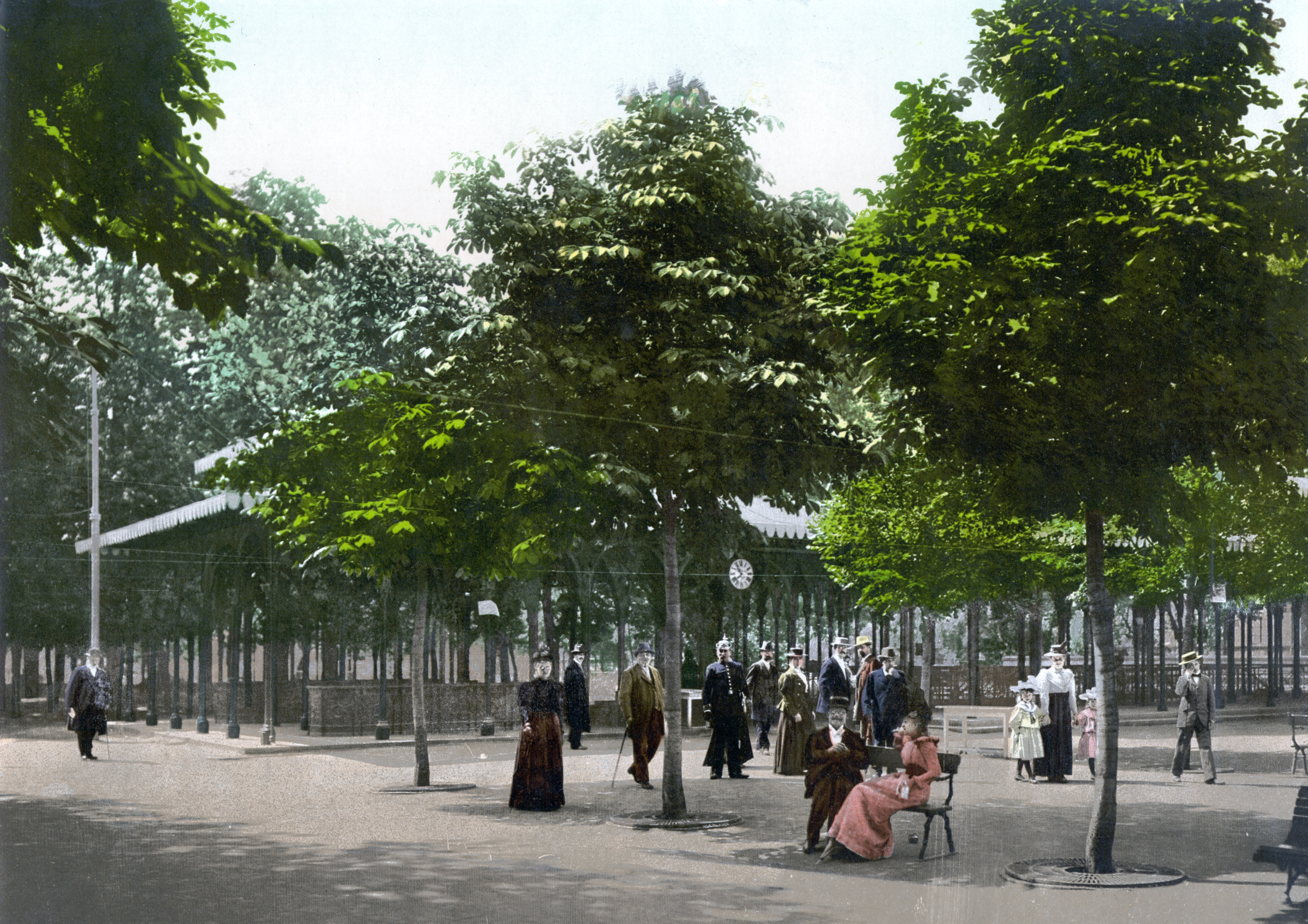
The Rákóczi Spring around 1900

The Rákóczi Festival (in German also written Rakoczyfest) is the largest city festival in the German spa town of Bad Kissingen. Since 1950, it has been taking place annually at the last weekend of July and lasting for three days. During the festival, the city's historical past is remembered, in which a multitude of prominent spa guests such as Empress Elisabeth of Austria, Emperor Alexander II of Russia or Chancellor Otto von Bismarck are portrayed to play important roles.

== The Naming of the Festival ==
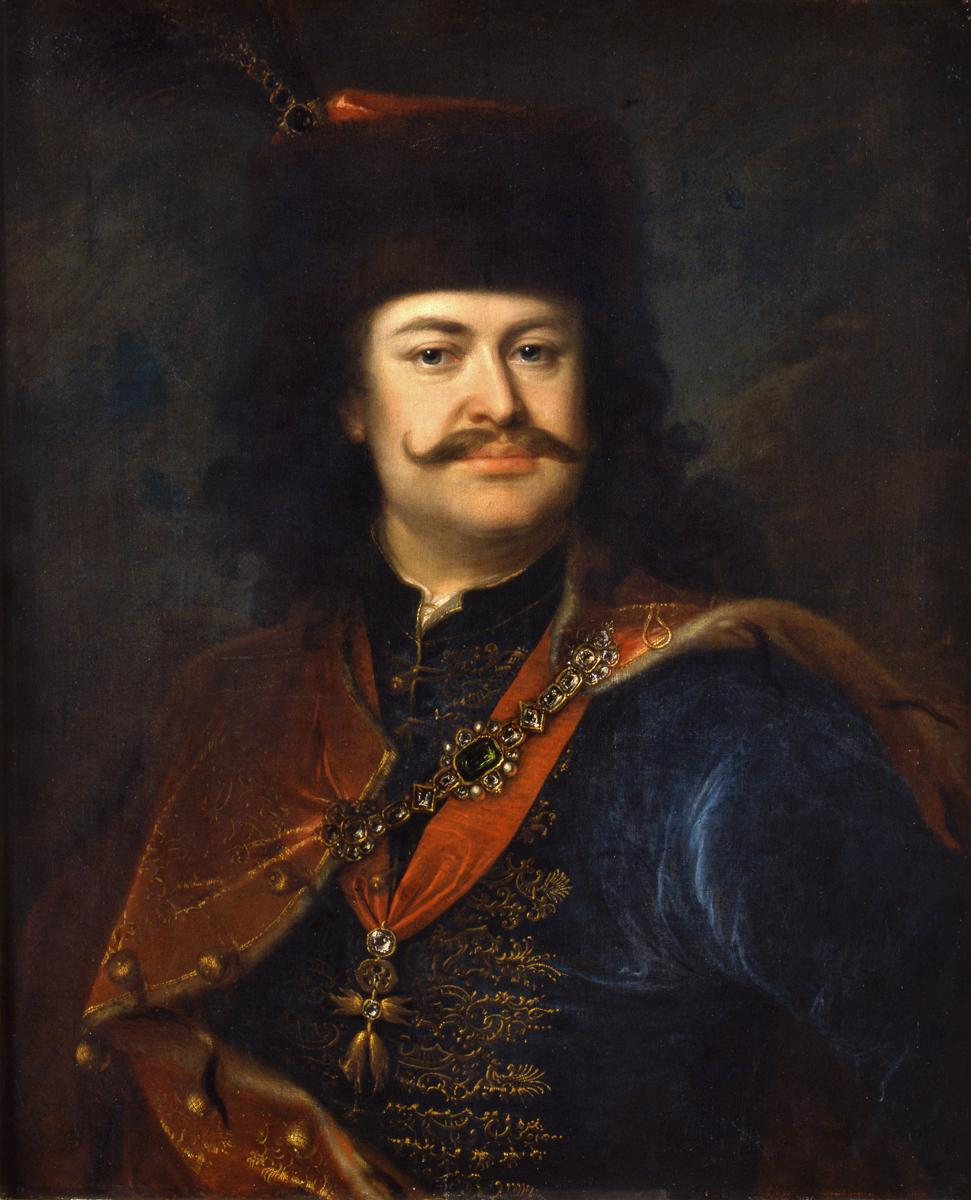
Hungarian national hero Francis II Rákóczi, after whom the Rákóczi Spring and the Rákóczi Festival of Bad Kissingen are named.

The Rákóczi Festival is, as it is the case with the Rákóczi Spring (which is the best-known spa spring in Bad Kissingen), named after the aristocrat Francis II Rákóczi, a Hungarian freedom fighter. Francis II Rákóczi had a certain popularity in that time, in which the spring was discovered by famous architect Johann Balthasar Neumann and local pharmacist Georg Anton Boxberger. This was the reason why the spring was named after Rákóczi, although Rákóczi had never been to Bad Kissingen.

== Characteristics and highlights ==
The Rákóczi Festival is a city festival to remember the history of Bad Kissingen with music being played in the whole inner centre of the city; former inhabitants of Bad Kissingen regularly revisit their hometown for the festival.

During the festival, historical personalities from Bad Kissingen's history are portrayed by the city's inhabitants in costumes. So, there is a performer for each historic spa guest, who has ever been to Bad Kissingen, as well as for Francis II Rákóczi, eponym of the festival.

Furthermore, the program of the festival includes a multitude of attractions such as ballooning in the Luitpold Park or burning numerous candles on the Saale ("The Saale burns"). The festival is concluded by the traditional fireworks.
