= Rákóczi Association =

The Rákóczi Association (Hungarian: Rákóczi Szövetség) is a Budapest-based non-governmental organization operating in the form of a civil society association established in 1989. The Association's founders were of Upper Hungarian ancestry or committed to the Hungarian community of the historical region, located in modern-day Slovakia. Between 1990 and 2018, Dr. József Halzl served as the Chairman of the Association; subsequently, he was elected Honorary Chairman by the General Assembly's unanimous vote. Dr Halzl, whose work and personality shaped the Association simultaneously during its three-decade history, served in this capacity until his death in November 2020.

== Objectives ==
Serving the Hungarian people in the Carpathian Basin and the wider world, the organization seeks to promote the cause of Hungarian culture, the Hungarian language and Hungarian communities. The Association's activities are directed primarily at Hungarian youth.

== Membership and organizational network ==
The Association boasts close to 30 000 members and over 500 local branch organizations throughout the Carpathian Basin, of which some 320 operate within secondary school institutions, close to 200 are tied to localities and approximately 30 are active within universities.

The organization's head office in Budapest operatives with 15 full-time, young members of staff and a number of committed volunteers. In the year 2019, the close to 80 activities held by the Rákóczi Association reached over 100 000, mostly juvenile participants.

== Leadership bodies ==
Honorary Chairman – Dr. József Halzl

=== Presidential board ===
Chairman – Csongor Csáky

Vice Chairmen – Ferencz Kun, Csaba Makláry-Szalontai, Árpád Martényi, Zsolt Németh, Péter Őry, Dr. Barnabás Ősi, Dr. Balázs Tárnok

Supervisory Committee: Dr Sándor Csaba Ambrus (chairman), Rudolf Gabri, Csaba Nagy, Tibor Tóth

Advisory Committee: Fülöp Benedek, Albert Biró, Dr. Zoltán Kántor, Zoltán Szilágyi, Dr. Katalin Szili, Mihály Takaró

Operative leaders: Csongor Csáky – Chairman; Csilla Katona – Director of Finance; Domonkos István Nagy – Director for Organizational Development and IT; László Petrovay – Director responsible for Hungarian School Choice; Anna Csizmadia – Head of Chairman's Secretariat; Flóra Katona – Communications Manager

== Activities ==
=== Hungarian School Choice Programme ===
Promoting Hungarian-language school choice among ethnic Hungarian families living outside of the country's borders is a priority on the Association's agenda, as those not enrolled by their parents on a Hungarian-language educational institution are at a high risk of being lost by the Hungarian community. In the interest of this, the organization reaches out to newborns, children in nursery school and those entering primary education. Up to 9000 newborns are welcomed annually by the Association with an infant diary under the "Gólyahír" Programme. During the Advent period, the organization routinely sends a present, together with thoughts encouraging parents to choose a Hungarian-language educational institution for their child, to over 20 000 kindergarten-age Hungarian-speaking youngsters living outside of the country's borders. During the spring, children enrolled to Hungarian-language schools are provided with a schoolbag, followed by a scholarship symbolizing Hungarian unity handed over personally to some 10 000 Hungarian first-graders at over 400 locations following the start of the curricular year in September. The recognition of nursery and primary school teachers, who play a key role in school choice, also commands an important position on the Association's agenda. The wide-scale social collaboration established in favour of the Hungarian School Choice Programme has seen five hundred Hungarian municipalities, as well as several private individuals and public figures, join forces to promote the cause.

=== Youth activities ===
The organization's activity focuses on secondary school-age youth, considering a significant proportion of identity and relationship networks are established between the age of 14 and 18. During this period, the Rákóczi Association seeks to expose young people to as many impulses as possible to help them value their Hungarian identity and build a multitude of inter-Hungarian relationships with each other. In the course of the Association's Student Travel Programme in the year 2019, some 22 000 students from over 600 secondary schools visited another Hungarian community by crossing at least one state border to mark a Hungarian national holiday or memorial day. The age group is served by secondary school students' meetings, weekend trips appealing to pupils from both sides of a state border, summer camps, the "Gloria Victis" and "Cultura Nostra" history competitions, as well as support granted to hundreds of grassroots initiatives in local school communities. In 2019, the 17 summer camps held by the Association were joined by 4500 young participants.

Based on the request of the Hungarian Diaspora Council and with support from the government of Hungary, the Rákóczi Association has announced its Diaspora Programme each year since 2016 with the aim of providing young people with Hungarian roots living throughout the world an opportunity to take part in camps and educational excursions in Hungary. to build relationships and strengthen their identity through immersing themselves in the Hungarian language and culture. Since 2016, the opportunities provided by the programme are enjoyed by 1000 young people from diaspora communities each year.

The organization's activity includes marking commemorative days celebrating the cult of Prince Francis II Rákóczi and the memory of the martyr Upper Hungary politician János Esterházy, as well as concerning the fate of the over 100 000 Hungarians deported and expelled from Czechoslovakia due to the Beneš decrees.

The Rákóczi Association was able to purchase the "Várhegy" holiday resort in Sátoraljaújhely, northeastern Hungary, thanks to supporting provided by the Government of Hungary. Since the acquisition, the complex has been operating under the name Rákóczi Camp and Events Centre.
