= Sisi Monument =

Monument for Empress of Austria in Bad Kissingen, Germany

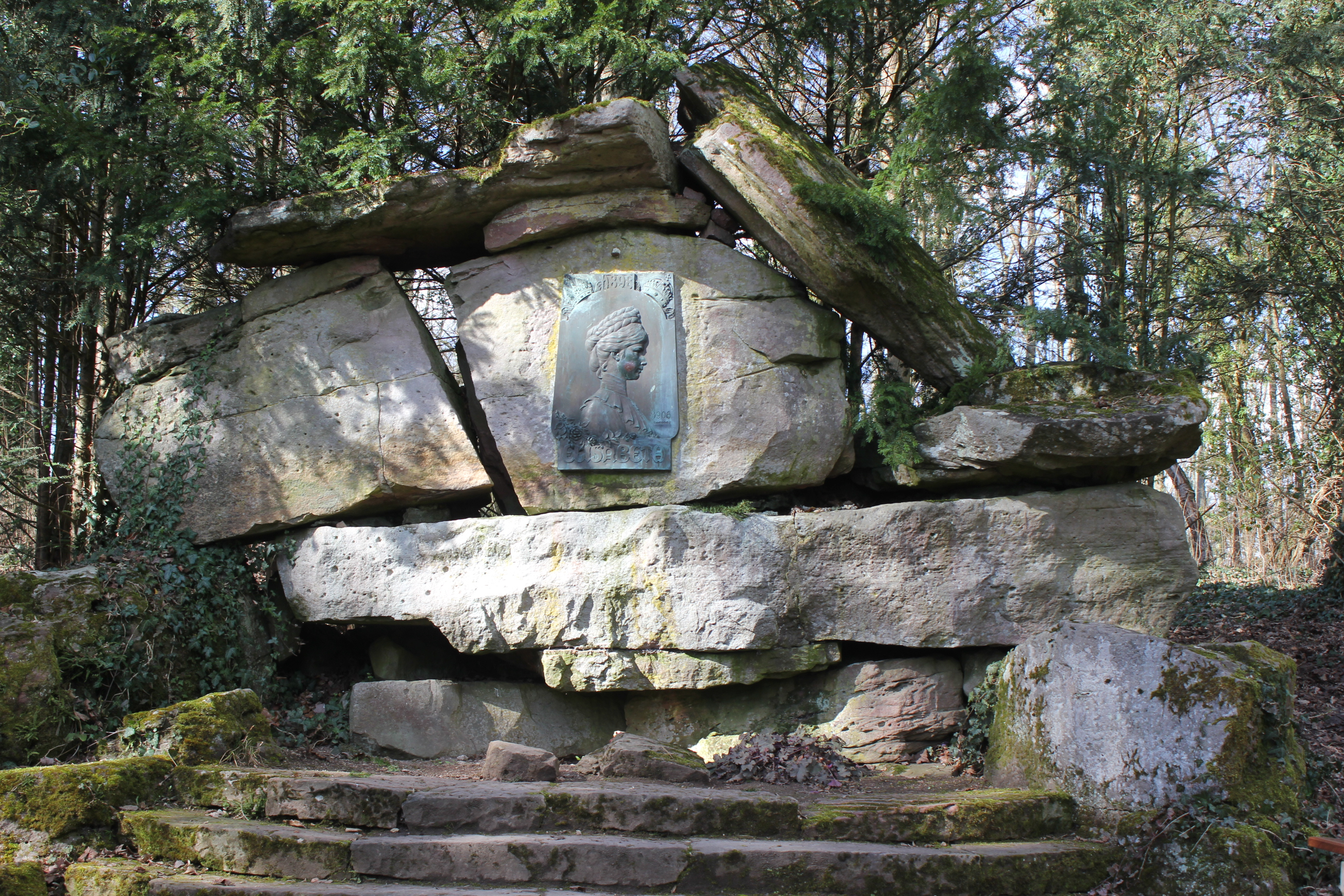
- Sisi's monument at Bad Kissingen
- Interactive map of Sisi Monument
- Location: Bad Kissingen
- Coordinates: 50.19405°N 10.07009°E
- Designer: Renninger, builder
- Type: Monument
- Completion date: 1906
- Dedicated to: Empress Elisabeth of Austria

The Sisi Monument (or Empress Elisabeth Monument) honouring Austrian Empress Elisabeth of Austria, nicknamed Sisi, is located on the top of the mountain Altenberg in Garitz, a quarter the Bavarian spa town of Bad Kissingen in the district of the same name in Lower Franconia.

It belongs to the architectural monuments of Bad Kissingen and is registered in the Bavarian List of Monuments.

== History ==
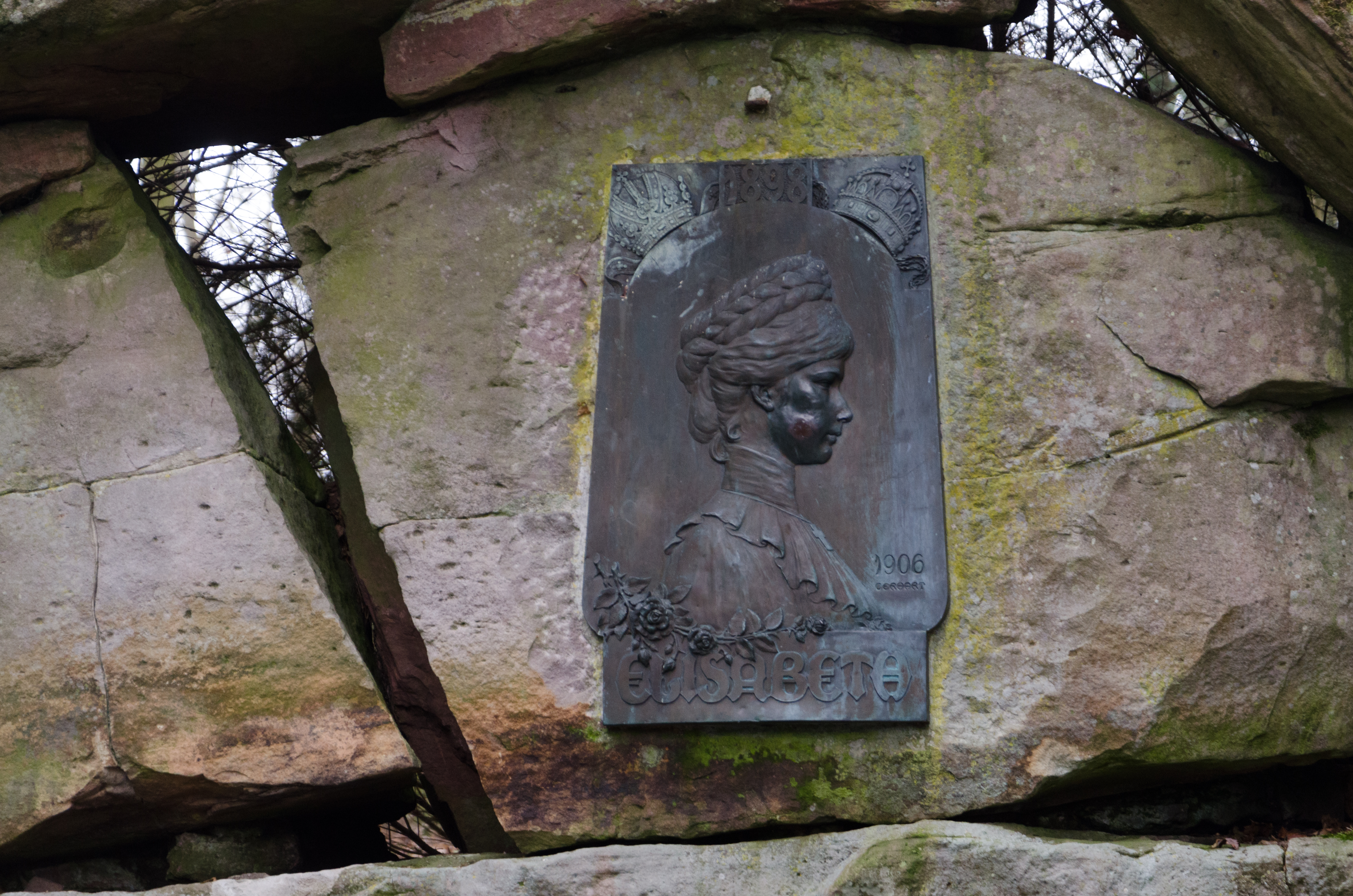
Plaque carrying the portrait of Empress Elisabeth of Austria.

Two months after Empress Elisabeth of Austria died, having spent several spa stays in Bad Kissingen (the last of which was several months before her death), Jacques Pilartz, court photographer from Bad Kissingen, proposed on 8 November 1898, a monument for Empress Elisabeth be erected. He had in mind that the fountain of Bad Kissingen at the corner of the streets of Garitzer Strasse (Garitzer Street) and the Bismarckstrasse (Bismarck Street) be renovated, redesigned and repurposed to an Empress Elisabeth Fountain. The town council was interested but had no money for the project to be realised so that, according to the meeting minutes from 10 November, Pilartz was given the order to obtain a cost estimate and to raise financial resources. The proposal however failed.

On 24 February 1903, a new attempt was made when the spa association and the medical district association invited to a meeting about the topic Monument and Memorial Stone, "which may direct in the whole future the guests of Kissingen to the remembrance of the high spa guest". In March 1904, the Committee for Building a Monument for the Remembrance üf Her Majesty Empress Elisabeth, which was planned for this purpose, announced that a simple stone was to be built as a memorial up to the summer of the same year that the Empress be eternally remembered, Bad Kissingen be honoured and future generation may not forget her. However, the time schedule could not be stuck to because the monument, in the end, turned out to be not that simple. Now, it was necessary to collect donations, to compare cost estimates and drafts, to find an appropriate location and finally to obtain the approval of the Imperial House in Vienna.

The decision finally was made for romanticising a rock formation on the Altenberg. A portrait of Empress Elisabeth cast by the Württembergische Metallwarenfabrik) located in Geislingen an der Steige was attached to the rock formation. The location is situated a few metres behind the Rundtempel, a viewing pavillon on the Altenberg. The rock formation consisting of foundlings was built by Renninger, a builder from Bad Kissingen. The portrait was made according to a model by Emanuel Gerhart, professor at the trade school in the Bohemian city of Liberec. The planting around the monument was done by the Royal Spa Gardener Wolfgang Singer.

The local newspaper Saale-Zeitung claimed that Balthasar Schmitt, a sculptor originating from Aschach, which now is a quarter of Bad Bocklet, in vain submitted a draft free of charge, what, however, cannot be confirmed by the files of the State Spa Administration. Possibly, he was mistaken for the hall attendant J. Th. Schmitt, who provided a property for the monument free of charge.

According to the report by the Saale-Zeitung, the monument was unveiled in a "simple, worthy manner". The unveiling was performed by the deputy chairman who represented Dr. Scherpf, the chairman of the committee. Musicians of the orchestra of Vienna, which at that time was responsible for the spa music of Bad Kissingen, played the national anthem and an Austrian traditional melody.

== Literature ==
- Balthasar Schmitt – Ein fränkischer Bildhauer. Accompanying booklet for the exhibition in the Castle of Aschach from April 28th to July 1995 30th, Theresienbrunnen-Verlag. Bad Kissingen 1995, S. 44, This article incorporates text from a publication now in the public domain: Dictionary of National Biography. London: Smith, Elder & Co. 1885–1900..
- Denis A. Chevalley, Stefan Gerlach: Denkmäler in Bayern - Stadt Bad Kissingen, 1998, S. 112–113.
- Peter Ziegler: Kaiserin Elisabeth und ihr Bad Kissingen. (= Infoflyer from the series Stadtgeschichtliche Informationen). 2. Auflage. Bad Kissingen 2021 (PDF).
- Cornelia Oelwein, Annette Späth: Kaiserlich & inkognito: Sisi in Bad Kissingen. (= Bad Kissinger Museums-Informationen. Heft 11. Published by Peter Weidisch). Verlag Stadt Bad Kissingen, Bad Kissingen 2023, ISBN 978-3-934912-29-8, S. 181–183
