= Bismarck Tower (Bad Kissingen) =

Coordinates: 50°12′44″N 10°05′24″E

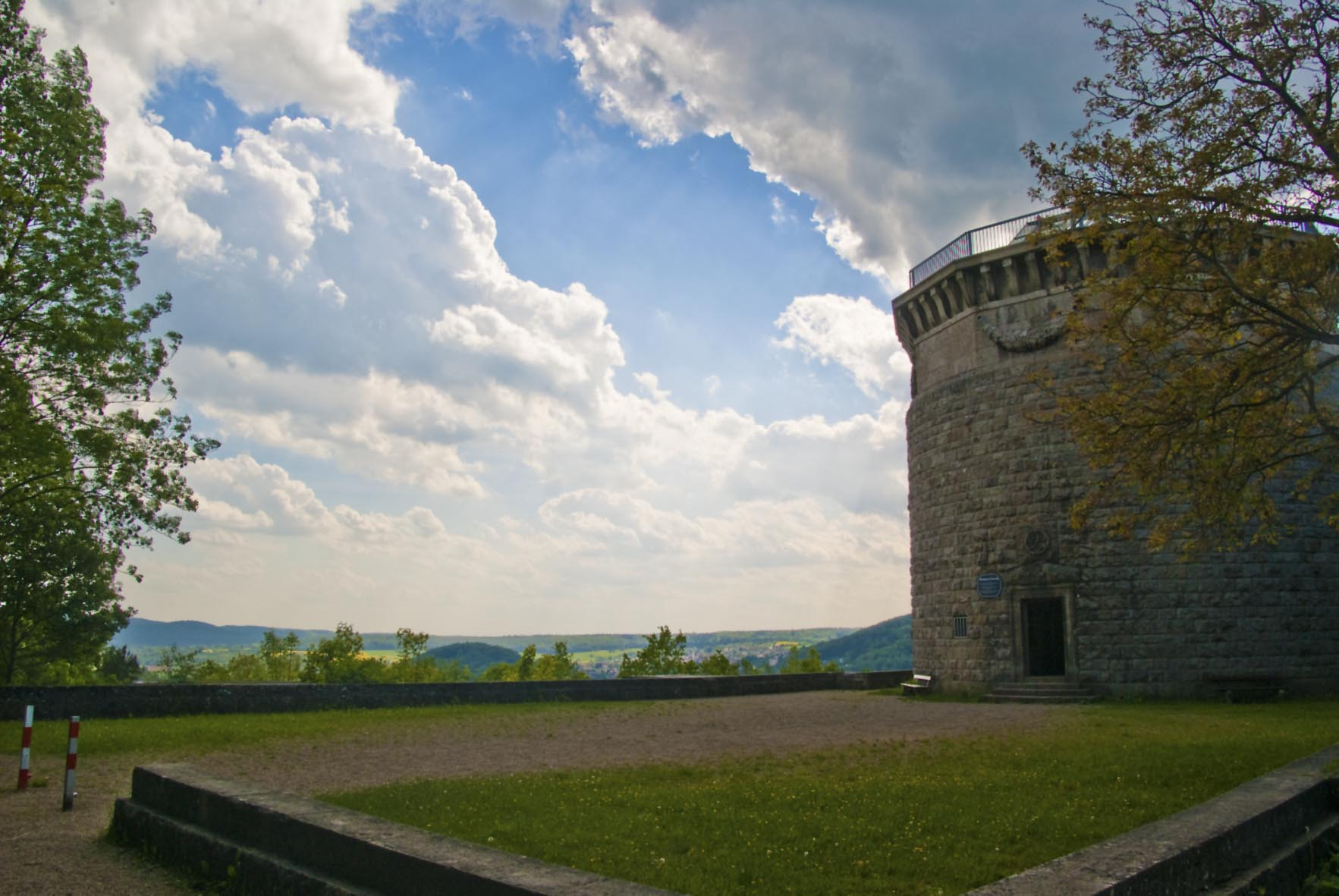
Bismarck Tower on the "Sinnberg" in Bad Kissingen.

The construction of the Bismarck Tower located on the "Sinnberg", a hill in the German spa town of Bad Kissingen, started in 1914 following the plans designed by architect, Wilhelm Kreis. It was projected by the local Bismarck Tower Association under the chairmanship of its founder, pharmacist Oscar Ihl. This association was in favour of Bismarck and the German Empire and competed in a certain way with the Wittelsbacher Association, which, even after the Unification of Germany, regarded the Kingdom of Bavaria to be a sovereign kingdom and built the Wittelsbacher Tower in Bad Kissingen in 1907.

Up to that time, the architect of the Bismarck Tower, Wilhelm Kreis, had already designed different Bismarck Towers; his concept "Götterdämmerung" alone was carried out in 47 towers, which differed only slightly from each other. The construction of the Bismarck Tower in Bad Kissingen, however, followed a completely new design.

Due to the outbreak of World War I, the completion of the construction was delayed. It was only on 2 December 1926 that, under the promotion of the "Movement for Completing the Tower" under the chairmanship of Wolfgang Singer, the director of the spa gardens, that the roofing ceremony could be held. The completion of the tower's exterior was delayed until 1930 due to the Great Depression. In 1934, Wolfgang Singer commissioned the construction of a hairpin-bended footway leading to the Bismarck Tower.

During World War II, the Bismarck Tower was used as an observation point for observing the airspace. It was only in 1985 that the construction of the tower's interior was started. So, the tower could be opened to the public on 21 June 1986. A staircase, bathrooms, and an observation deck were built into the tower.

== See also ==
- Bismarck Monument (Bad Kissingen)
