= Wichtelhöhlen (Bad Kissingen) =

Coordinates: 50°10′30″N 10°03′35″E

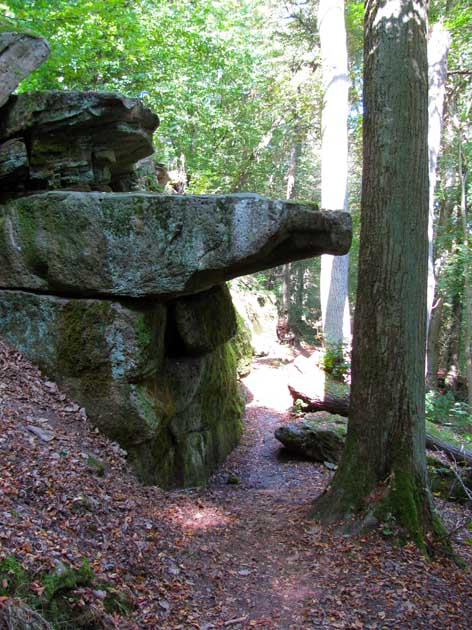
The so-called "pulpit" of the Wichtelhöhlen

The so-called Wichtelhöhlen (Bad Kissingen) — gnome caves — are a rock formation with small caves located near Bad Kissingen in Lower Franconia in the center of Germany. The formation of nearly 20 sandstone rocks in the valley of the Fränkische Saale dates back to the early Triassic period.

== Origin of the caves ==
The "Wichtelhöhlen" consist of a particular type of sandstone (Buntsandstein) typical for the area. They have their origin in the leaching of the Fränkische Saale. The so-called caves are merely cracks and voids between the broken slabs of sandstone. (for detailed information, please see "External links")

== Natural environment ==
The "Wichtelhöhlen" are special protected environmental area ('geschützter Landschaftsbestandteil'). Small animals are looking for protection during wintertime while they are making their hibernation or winter rest. The caves are located in the neighbourhood of the "Man and Biosphere Reserve Programme Rhön". They are under the special supervision of the local natural Conservation Office.

== Legend ==
The place is shrouded in legend. People used to believe that actual gnomes lived in the small caves and helped a miller close to the caves. But after the miller mistreated the gnomes, they returned to their caves while the miller spent the rest of his life in poverty.

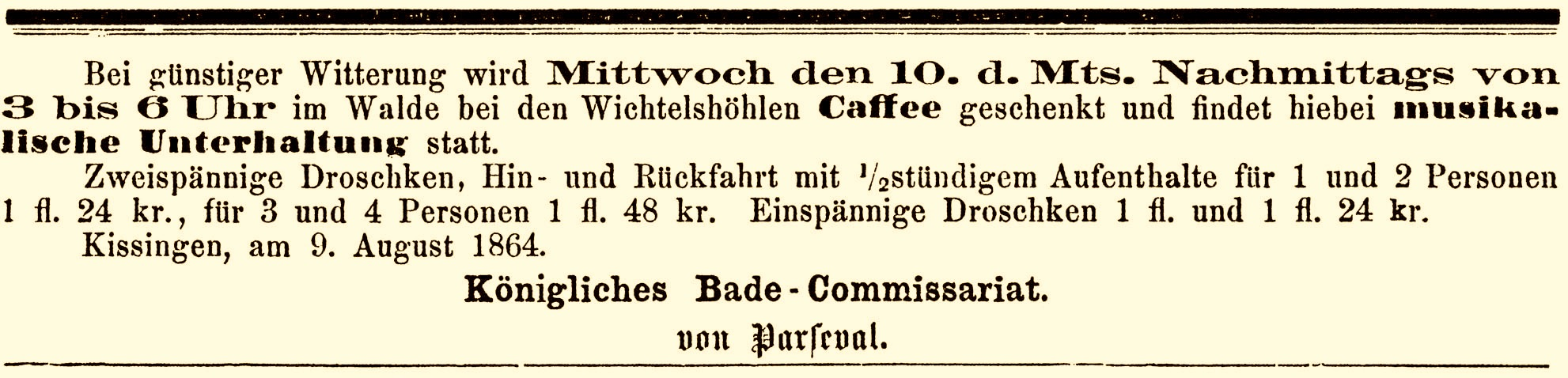
Advertisement from 1864 as an evidence of the popularity of the Wichtelhöhlen

== Literature ==
- Franz Anton von Balling: Die Heilquellen und Bäder zu Kissingen, Bad Kissingen 1876, p. 246.
- Werner Eberth: Michael Arnold (1824 - 1877) – Ein Bildhauer des Spätklassizismus, Bad Kissingen 2001, p. 115f.
- Edi Hahn: Bad Kissingen und seine Umgebung die schönsten Sagen, Legenden und Geschichten, Bad Kissingen 1986, p. 48ff.
- Thomas Künzl: Vorzeit & Geologie – Wichtelhöhlen, Stadtgeschichtliche Informationen (Stadtarchiv Bad Kissingen) April 2010.
- Josef Lisiecki: Sagen und Legenden aus dem Landkreis Bad Kissingen, Bad Kissingen 1982, p. 43.
- Andreas Wolfgang Nikola: Volkssagen aus dem Saalegau, Bad Kissingen 1936, p. 11f.
- Heike Paulus: Wo die Wichtel zu Hause sind, Gäste-Journal Februar 2005, p. 14f.
- Grieben Reiseführer: Bad Kissingen und Umgebung, Berlin 1939, p. 56.
