= Kissingen Dictation =

1877 statement on German foreign policy

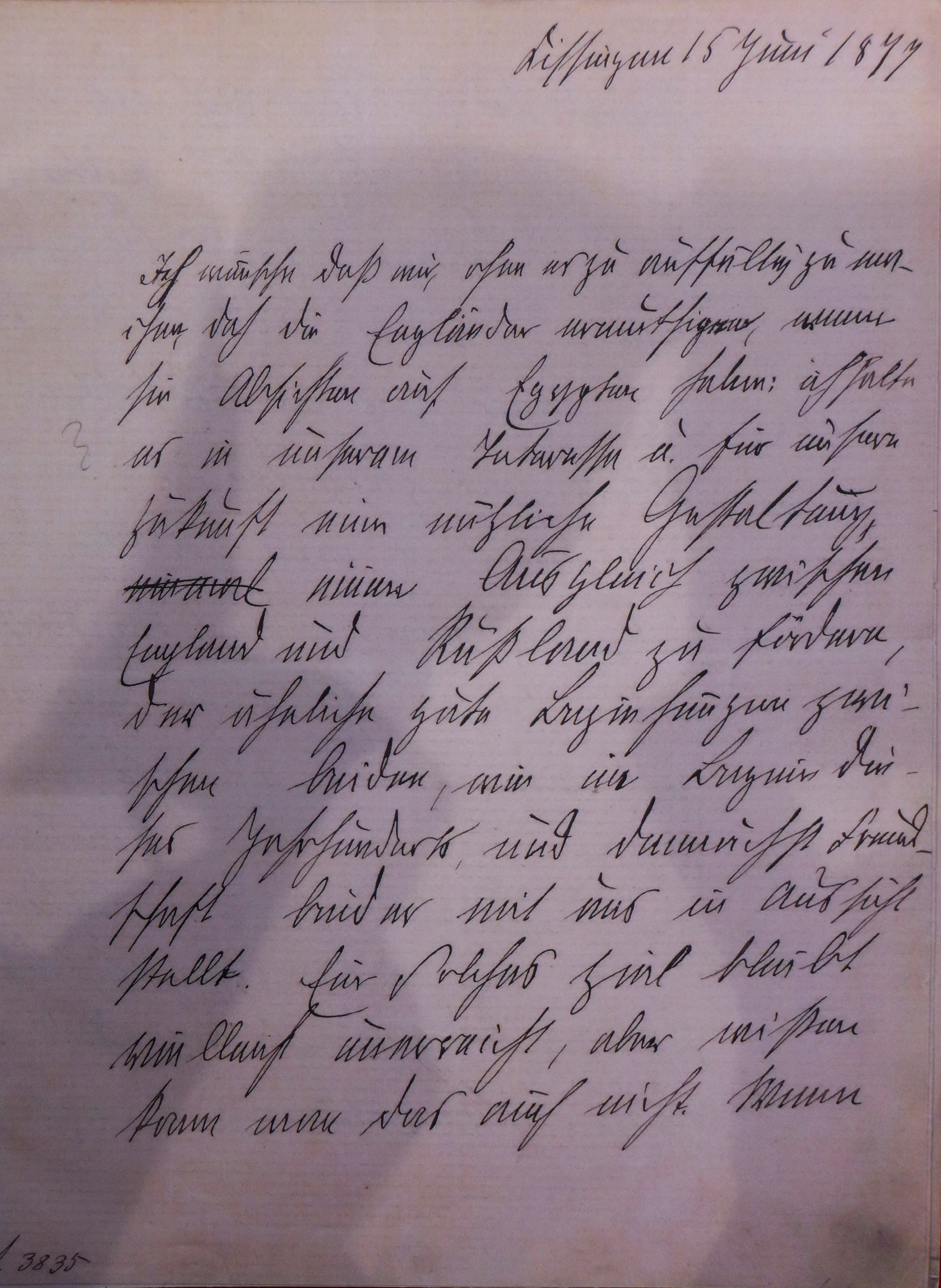
First page of the "Kissingen Dictation"

The Kissingen Dictation (in German: Kissinger Diktat) is a diplomatic file created in Bad Kissingen by the German Chancellor Otto von Bismarck during the summer of 1877. It contains the principles of his foreign policy.

Bismarck feared coalitions of the other European powers against the newly created German Empire of 1871 ("nightmare of coalitions" or French "cauchemar des coalitions") with its vulnerable geographical position in the middle of Europe. The unification of Germany had been achieved in a war against France in 1870/71. France had lost Alsace and a part of Lorraine at the end and Bismarck feared a French revenge. In the Kissingen Dictation, which Otto von Bismarck dictated to his son Herbert in connection with the Great Eastern Crisis on 15 June 1877 in Bad Kissingen, he designed the ideal image "of a political situation in which all powers except France require us; and are deterred of coalitions against us by their relations to each other as far as possible".

The document describes a defensive policy to avoid a war in central Europe and so to secure the position of Germany. To prevent alliances against Germany Bismarck wanted to use the conflicts of interest between the other European powers in the periphery or outside of Europe. A supporting or at least neutral position of Germany in these conflicts should be necessary for all of them.

The Kissingen dictation conceived the program of his diplomacy, realized in Bismarck's system of alliances with the Dual Alliance between Germany and Austria, the Triple Alliance between Germany, Austria and Italy, and the Reinsurance Treaty between Germany and Russia.
