= József Halzl =

Hungarian politician (1933–2020)

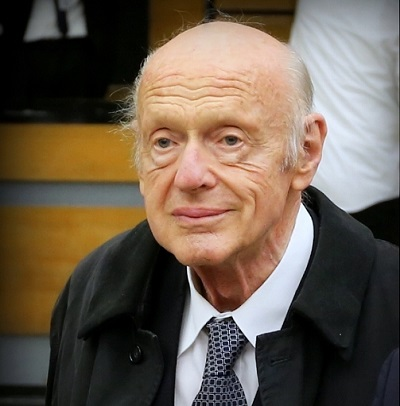

Leader of the Rákóczi Association
- In office 1990–2018
- Preceded by: László Dobossy
- Succeeded by: Csongor Csáky

Personal details
- Born: 19 December 1933 Győr, Hungary
- Died: 13 November 2020 (aged 86) Budapest
- Party: Hungarian Democratic Forum
- Profession: mechanical engineer

József Halzl (19 December 1933 – 13 November 2020) was a mechanical engineer, co-founder of the Hungarian Democratic Forum and Honorary Life Chairman of the Rákóczi Association.

== Early life ==
József Halzl was born in Győr on 19 December 1933. On his father's side, his family originates from Szenc (today Senec, Slovakia); his mother was a native of Sopronkeresztúr (today Deutschkreuz, Austria). Having pursued his studies in Ács, Pannonhalma, Hatvan and Budapest, he matriculated from the II. Rákóczi Ferenc High School in Budapest. He graduated in mechanical engineering at the Budapest University of Technology in 1957, later obtaining a doctorate at the same institution.

Having participated in the Revolution of 1956 as a fifth-year student at the University of Technology, he wrote a diary as events unfolded. The diary was published following Hungary's transition to democracy.

== Career ==
Pursuing his professional career in the field of energetics, he worked on research concerning thermal power stations at the Energy Research Institute (EGI) prior to democratic transition.

Between 1991 and 1994, he was leader of Hungary's largest company as CEO of the Hungarian Electricity Works. During Hungary's transition to a democratic political system, he actively participated in the work of the Hungarian Democratic Forum, serving as party director for a period.

He was Chairman of the Rákóczi Association between 1990 and 2018. In 2018, he was elected the Association's Honorary Life Chairman.

In addition to his work with the Rákóczi Association, his social activity included the organization of the youth community of the Városmajor Roman Catholic Parish, Budapest, from the 1980s. He was also leader of the Héra Foundation, committed to assisting the energy consumption of underprivileged households.

An expert in playing the piano himself, his life had been defined by a fondness of classical music.

== Chief works ==
- 1956-os napló ("A Diary of 1956"). Rákóczi Association, 2006
- Rákóczi jegyében. Halzl Józseffel beszélget Cservenka Judit. ("In the Spirit of Rákóczi. József Halzl's Conversations with Judit Cservenka"). Kairosz, Budapest, 2011. ISBN 978-963-662-491-0
- 1956-os napló. 2., jav. kiad. ("A Diary of 1956. Second, revised edition"). Rákóczi Association, 2016

== Major awards ==
Halzl was the recipient of the following:

- János András Segner Award (1969)
- Géza Szikla Award (1989)
- Medallion of the Hungarian Electricity Works (MVM (1991)
- János Esterházy Medallion (2000)
- Medallion of the Széchenyi Society (2009)
- Hungarian Heritage Award (2010)
- Commander's Cross of the Hungarian Order of Merit, Civilian's Class (2011)
- St. Stephen Award (Esztergom) (2013)
- Commander's Cross with Star of the Hungarian Order of Merit (2016)
- St. Martin Award (2017)
- Pro Urbe Budapest Award (2018)
- Award for Hungarian Youth (2018)
- Gábor Bethlen Award (2019)
