= Ludwig Tower =

Coordinates: 50°12′8.3″N 10°03′31″E

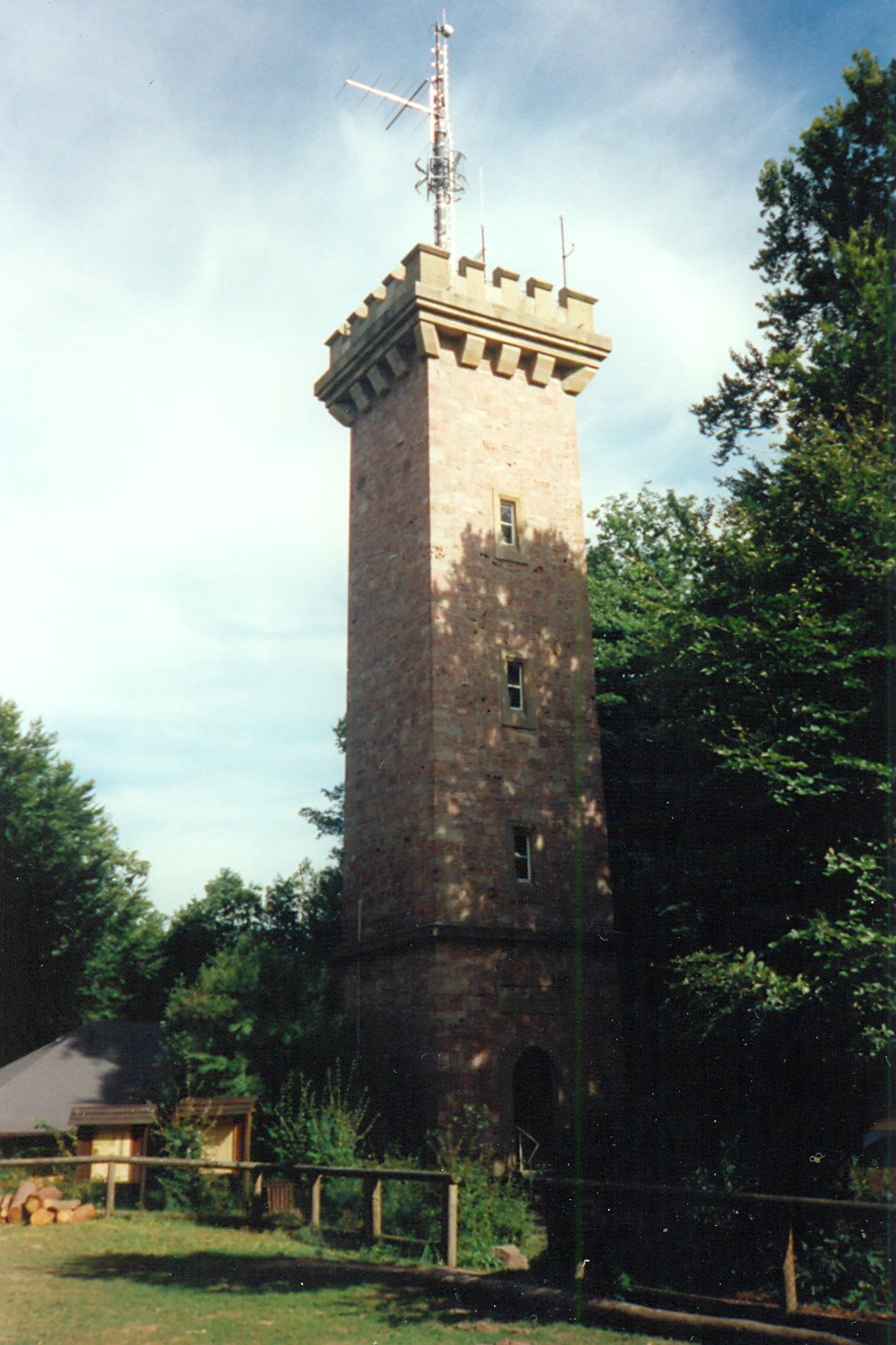
The Ludwig Tower Staffelsberg in Bad Kissingen.

The Ludwig Tower in Bad Kissingen is located on the Staffelsberg, a hill in the German spa town of Bad Kissingen. The tower is to commemorate the House of Wittelsbach and, thus, named after Bavarian king Ludwig I of Bavaria. The tower belongs to the heritage registers of Bad Kissingen and has an entry in the List of Heritage Registers in Bavaria.

== History ==
It was the then Lord Mayor of Bad Kissingen, Carl Fürst, who came up with the idea of building the Ludwig Tower. After a construction period of two years, the tower's unveiling took place on 29 August 1883 under Theobald von Fuchs, Fürst's successor as the Lord Mayor of Bad Kissingen. Although an extension to increase its height was planned in 1912, it was never carried out.

The tower became very popular as a lookout from the very beginning. However, it eventually lost this status as surrounding trees obscured the view. Today, a training centre of the Diocese Union of the Pathfinders of St Georg from Würzburg is located next to the tower.

The Ludwig Tower has been in a ruinous state for several years and had to be closed for the public in 2008. In March 2012, the Town Council of Bad Kissingen announced that there is no possibility to finance a general reconstruction, which would cost €120,000. It is also out of question to demolish the tower as, on the one hand, there is also no possibility to cover the demolition costs of €40,000 and, on the other hand, the Ludwig Tower is landmarked.

== Architecture ==
The tower's ground area has a quadrate shape. The tower is made of sandstone and built in a cuboid-formed shape.
