= Bad Kissingen =

- Town
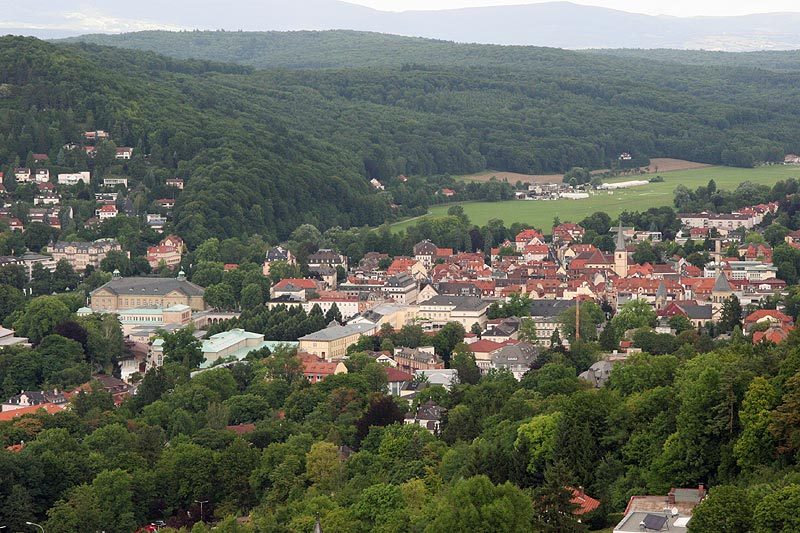
- Bad Kissingen viewed from Bodenlaube ruins

- Coat of arms

- Location of Bad Kissingen within Bad Kissingen district
- Interactive map of Bad Kissingen
- Location within Germany Location within Bavaria
- Coordinates: 50°12′N 10°4′E
- Country: Germany
- State: Bavaria
- Admin. region: Unterfranken
- District: Bad Kissingen
- Subdivisions: 9 Stadtteile

Government
  - Mayor (2020–26): Dirk Vogel (SPD)

Area
  - Total: 69.92 km^{2} (27.00 sq mi)
- Elevation: 220 m (720 ft)

Population (2025-12-31)
  - Total: 23,191
  - Density: 331.7/km^{2} (859.0/sq mi)
- Time zone: UTC+01:00 (CET)
  - Summer (DST): UTC+02:00 (CEST)
- Postal codes: 97688
- Dialling codes: 0971
- Vehicle registration: KG
- Website: www.badkissingen.de

UNESCO World Heritage Site
- Part of: The Great Spa Towns of Europe
- Criteria: Cultural: (ii)(iii)
- Reference: 1613
- Inscription: 2021 (44th Session)

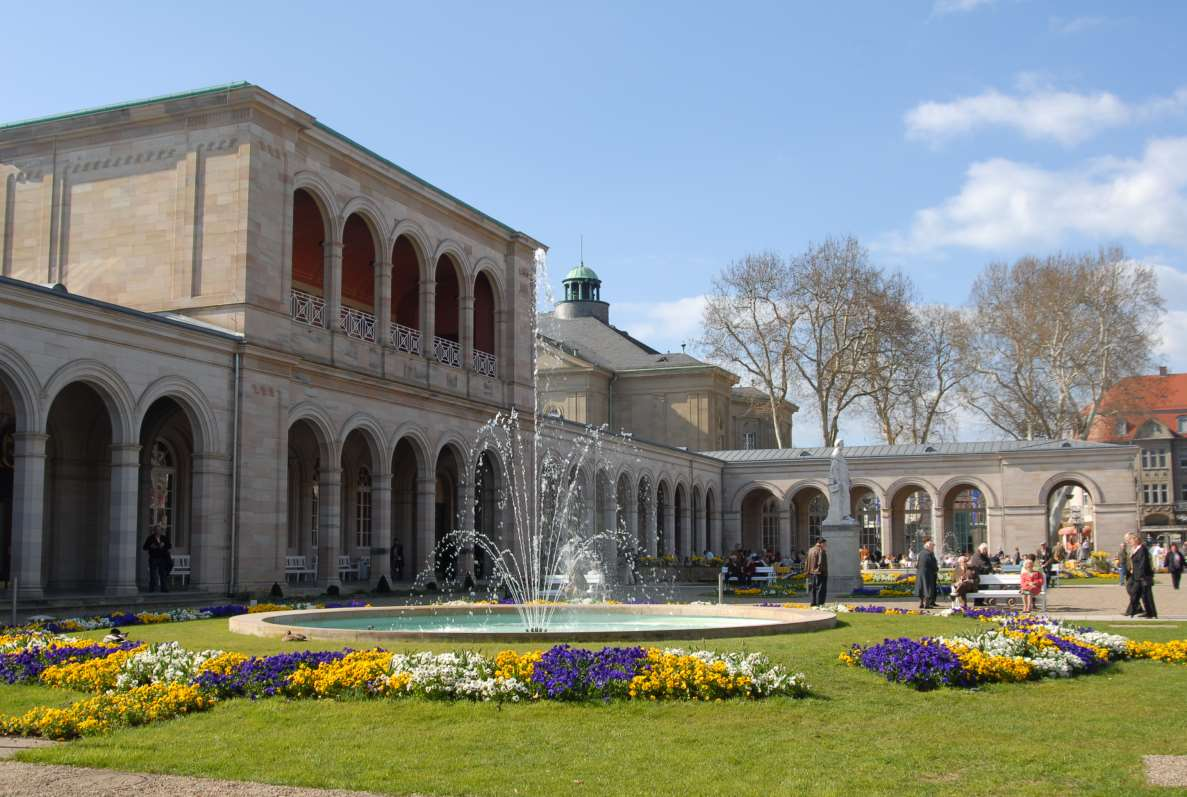
Spa Park Bad Kissingen with "Arkadenbau"

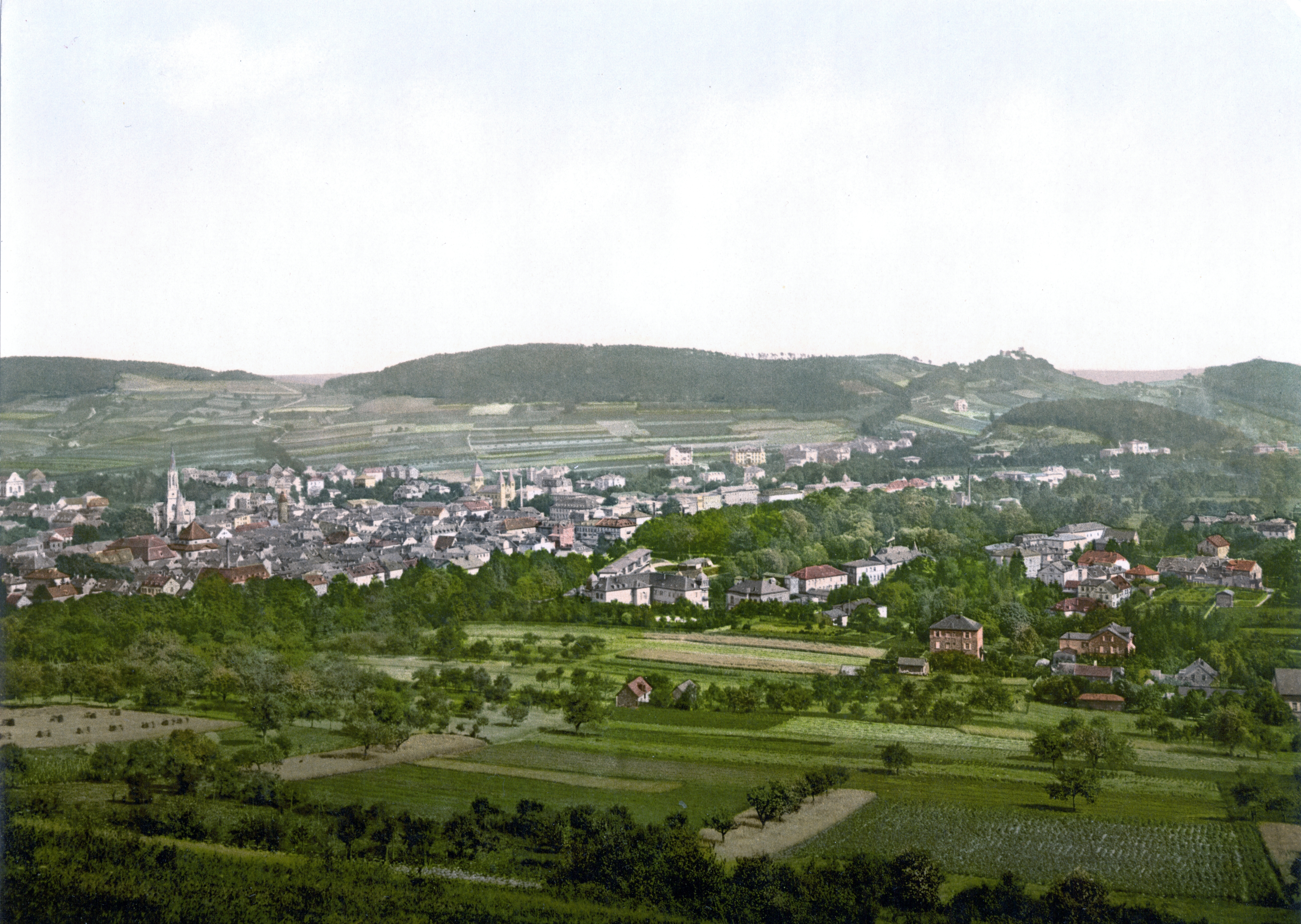
Bad Kissingen in 1900

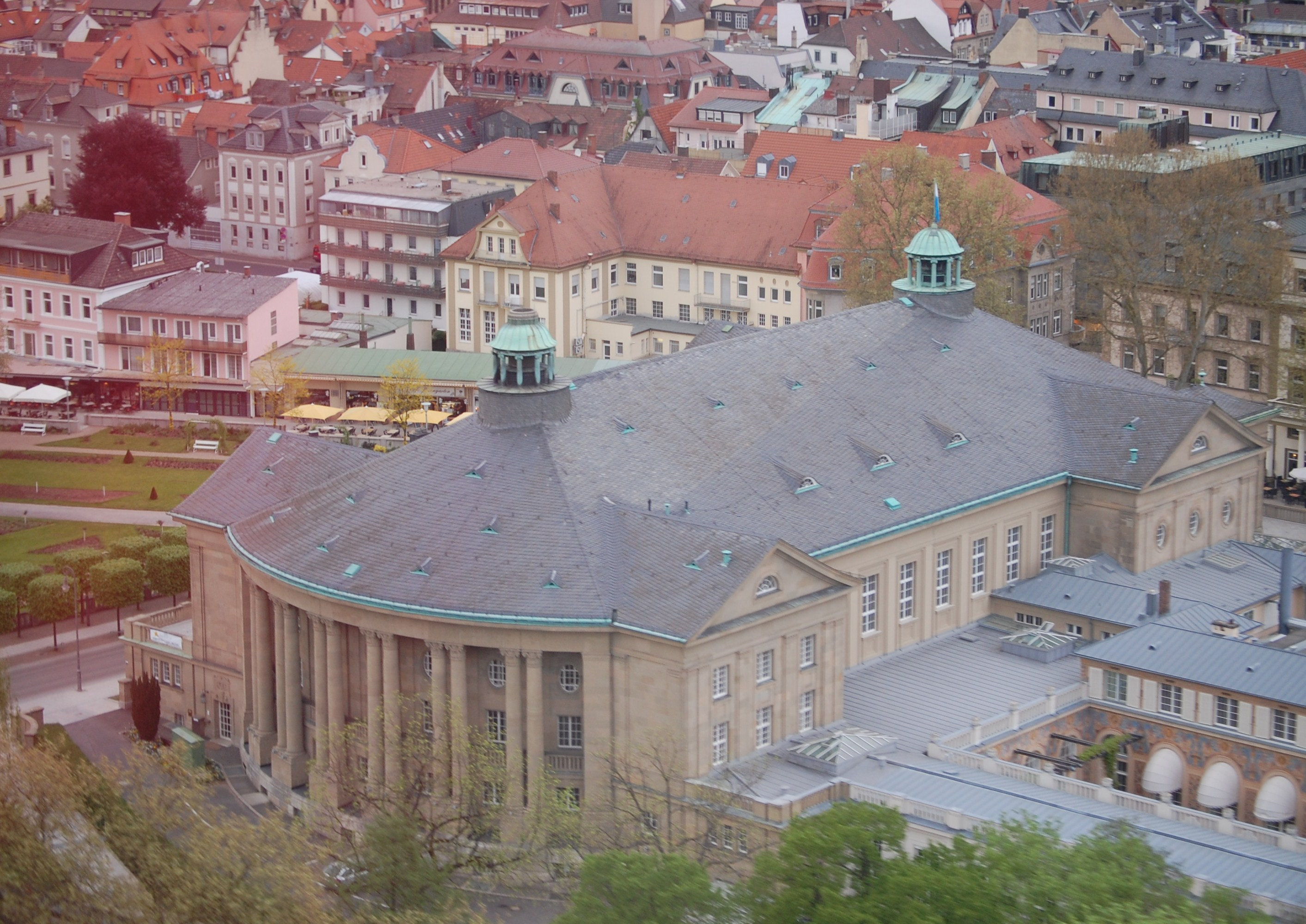
The concert hall "Regentenbau"

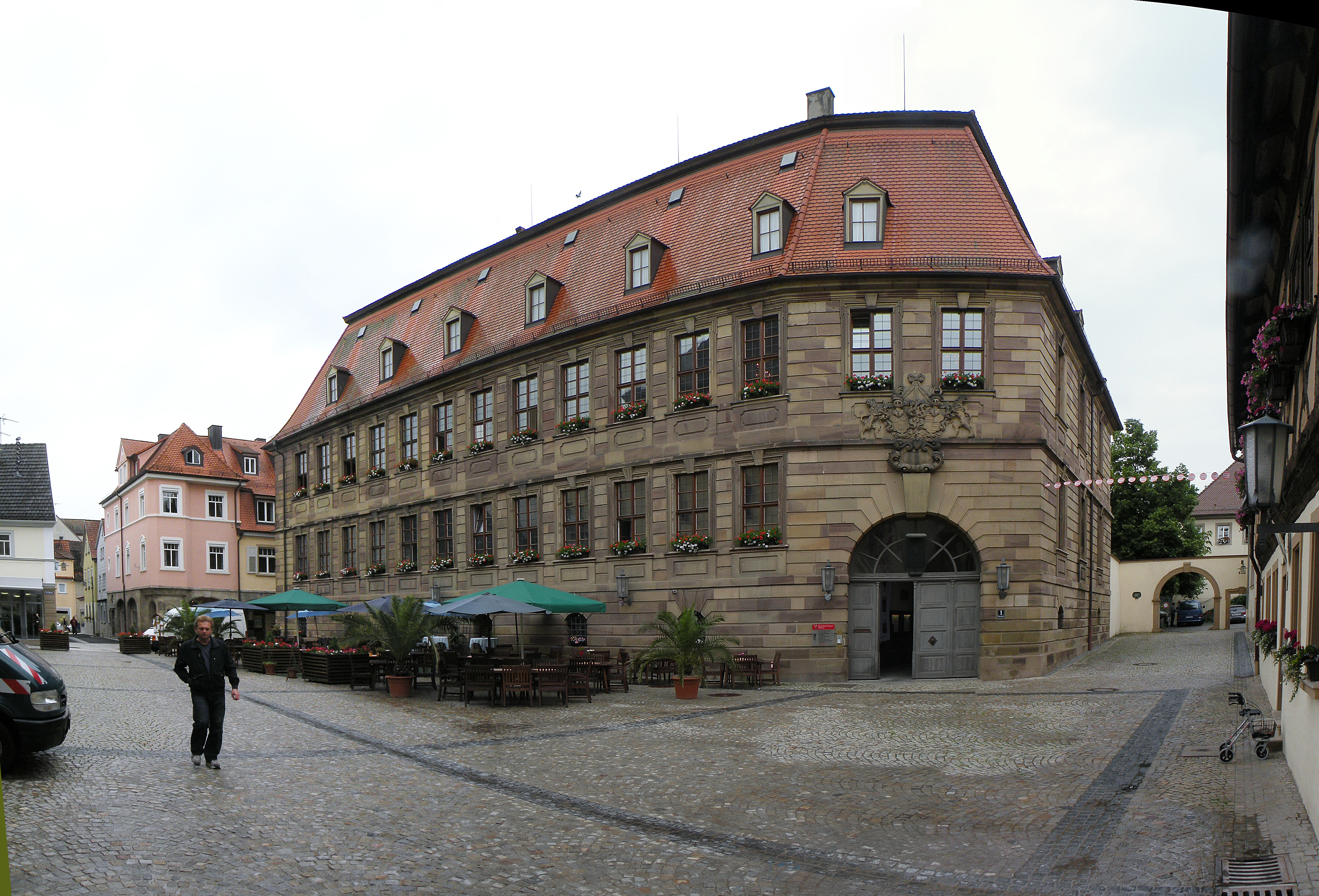
Town hall of Bad Kissingen

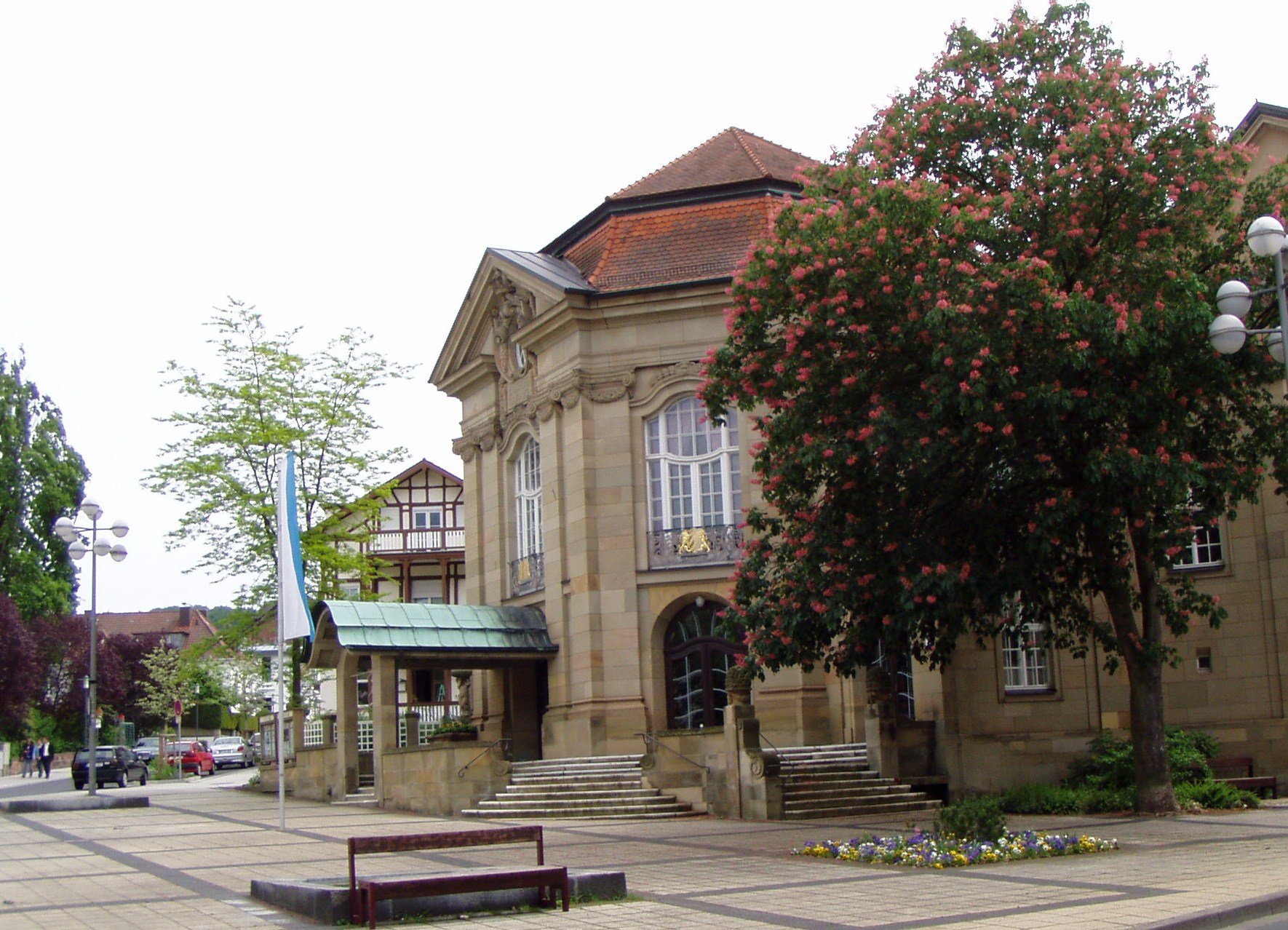
The theatre of Bad Kissingen

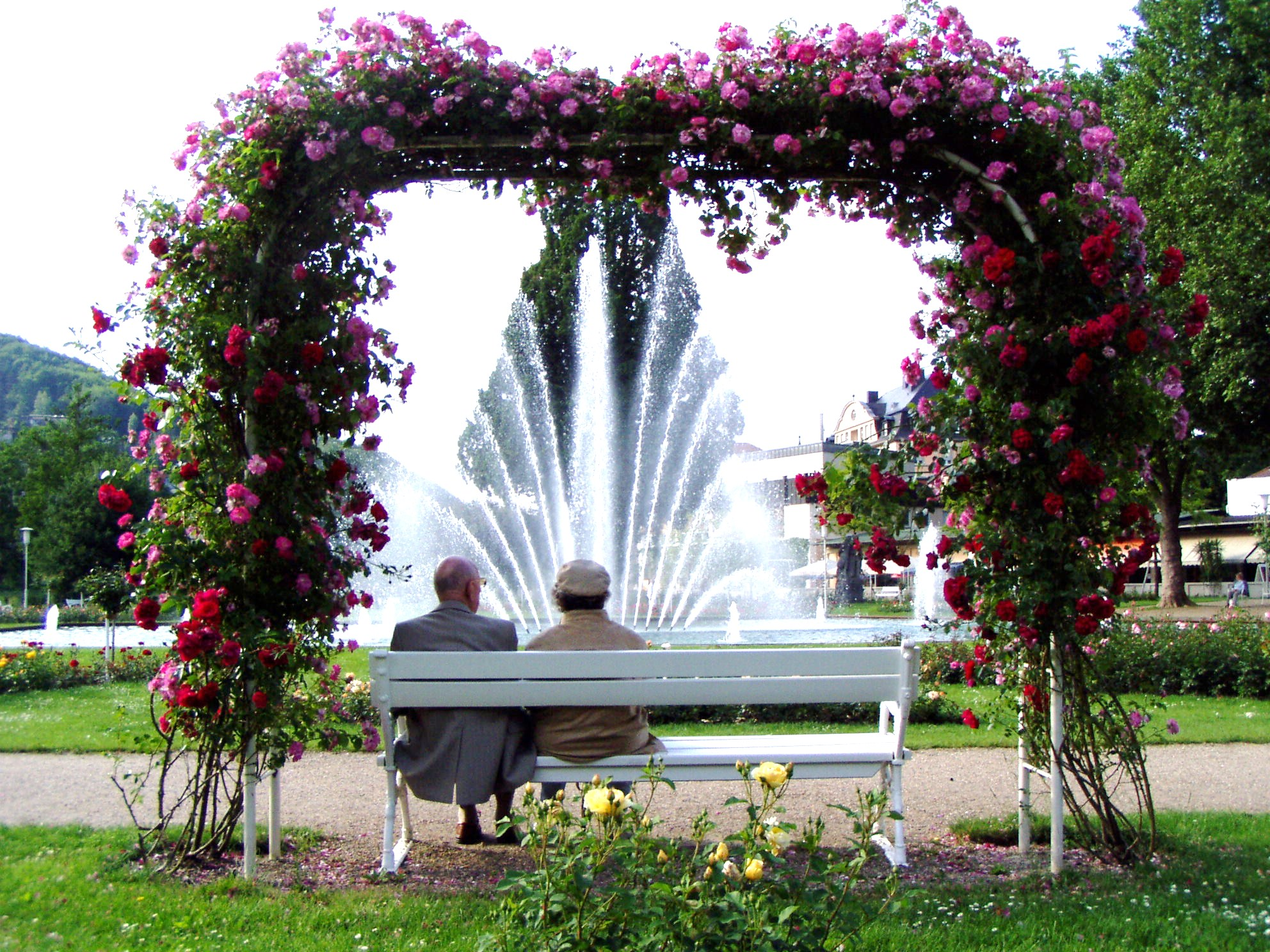
"Rosengarten" (Rose Garden) in Bad Kissingen

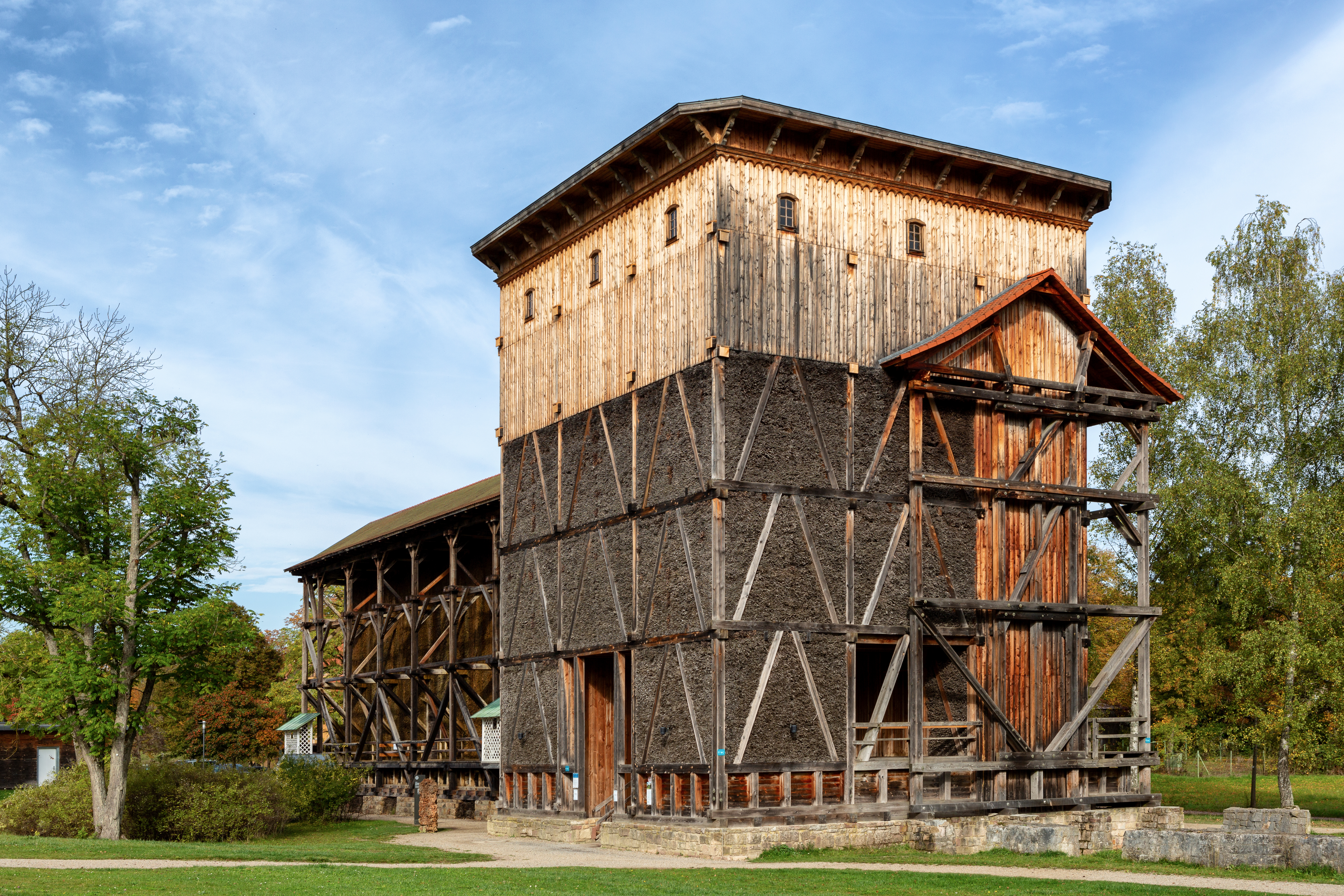
The graduation tower is a known landmark.

Bad Kissingen (German pronunciation: [baːt ˈkɪsɪŋən]) is a German spa town in the Bavarian region of Lower Franconia and seat of the district Bad Kissingen. Situated to the south of the Rhön Mountains on the Franconian Saale river, it is one of the health resorts, which became famous as a "Weltbad" in the 19th century.

In 2021 the town became part of the transnational UNESCO World Heritage Site under the name "Great Spa Towns of Europe", because of its famous mineral springs and its architecture exemplifying the popularity of spa resorts in Europe during the 18th through 20th centuries.

== History ==
The town was first documented in the year 801 under the name chizzicha and was renowned above all for its mineral springs, which are recorded from as early as 823. At that time, Kissingen was under the domination of Fulda Abbey, later it fell to the Counts of Henneberg and was sold to the bishops of Würzburg in the 14th century. Kissingen was first mentioned as "oppidum" (town) in 1279. The town developed into a spa in the 1500s and recorded its first official spa guest in 1520. In 1814, Kissingen became part of Bavaria. The town grew to be a fashionable resort in the 19th century, and was extended during the reign of Ludwig I of Bavaria. Crowned heads of state such as Empress Elisabeth of Austria, Tsar Alexander II of Russia and King Ludwig II of Bavaria, who bestowed the 'Bad' on Kissingen in 1883, were among the guests of the spa at this time. Other well-known visitors to the resort included author Leo Tolstoy, composer Gioachino Rossini and artist Adolph von Menzel.

On 10 July 1866, during the Mainfeldzug (campaign at the river Main) of the Austro-Prussian War, Kissingen was the site of fierce battle between Bavarian and Prussian troops, which ended with a Prussian victory.

Imperial Chancellor Otto von Bismarck visited Bad Kissingen's spas many times. In 1874, during the Kulturkampf, he survived an assassination attempt in the town by the Catholic Eduard Franz Ludwig Kullmann. In 1877, he dictated the Kissingen Dictation (German: Kissinger Diktat), in which he explained the principles of his foreign policy. Bismarck's former home in Bad Kissingen is now the Bismarck Museum.

In June 1911 Alfred von Kiderlen-Waechter, German Secretary of State, and the French ambassador Jules Cambon had negotiations in Bad Kissingen about Morocco without achieving a solution. The failure of the negotiations led to the Agadir Crisis.

The resort's clientele changed in the 20th century, with ordinary people increasingly replacing nobility as guests. The spa suffered a one-year interruption in 1945, the only closure in its history.

Shortly prior to World War II Manteuffel Kaserne (Manteuffel barracks) was established at the eastern edge of the Bad Kissingen town center by the German military as part of Hitler's program to expand the German Wehrmacht. In 1945, the American army entered the town peacefully and took over the Kaserne, which was renamed Daley Barracks in 1953. The barracks were closed in the 1990s after the fall of the Iron Curtain when the American troops were withdrawn.

After the war, the Department of Social Security built clinics in the town. A change in health legislation in the 1990s reduced the opportunities for German health insurance contracts to fund spa visits, which led to job losses. As a result, efforts were made to attract a new kind of clientele, helped in no small part by the EMNID survey which named Bad Kissingen Germany's best-known spa town.

In 2015, about 1.5 million overnight stays of more than 238,000 visitors were registered in the town. With the opening of the KissSalis Therme in February 2004, Bad Kissingen gained a spa leisure centre and, in December 2004, the German-Chinese Football Academy was opened in the town, where the Chinese "08 Star Team" lived and trained in preparation for the Olympic Games in Beijing in 2008.

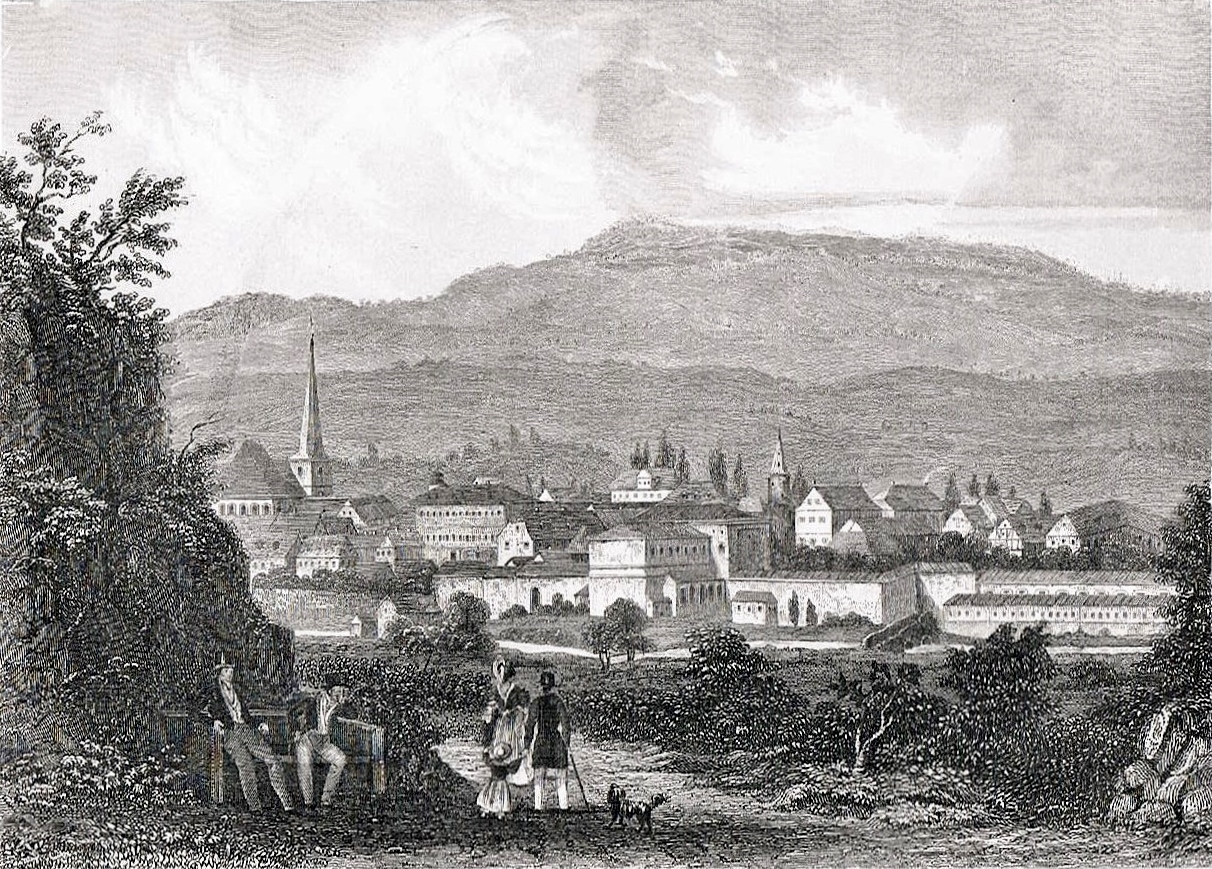
Kissingen about 1850, still with remains of the medieval fortification

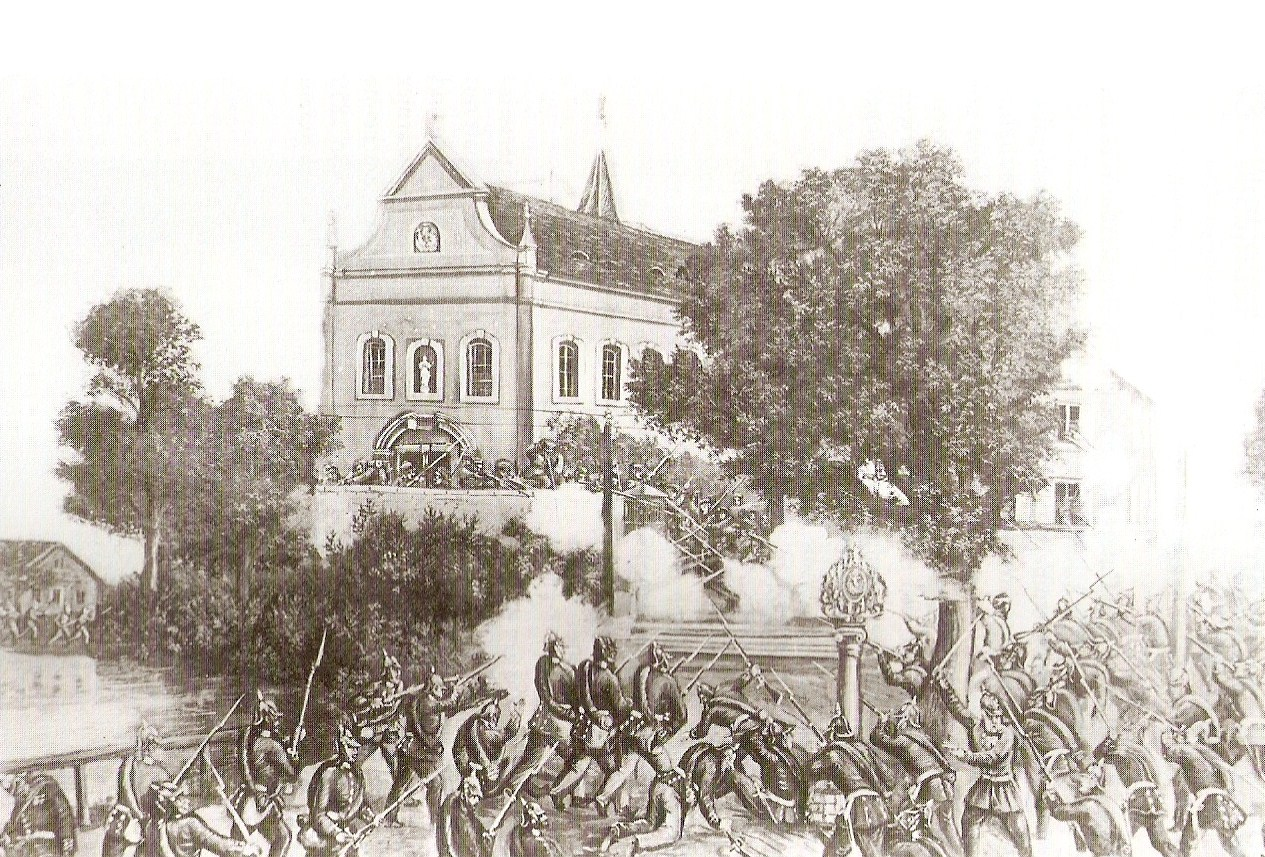
The Battle of Kissingen, 10 July 1866

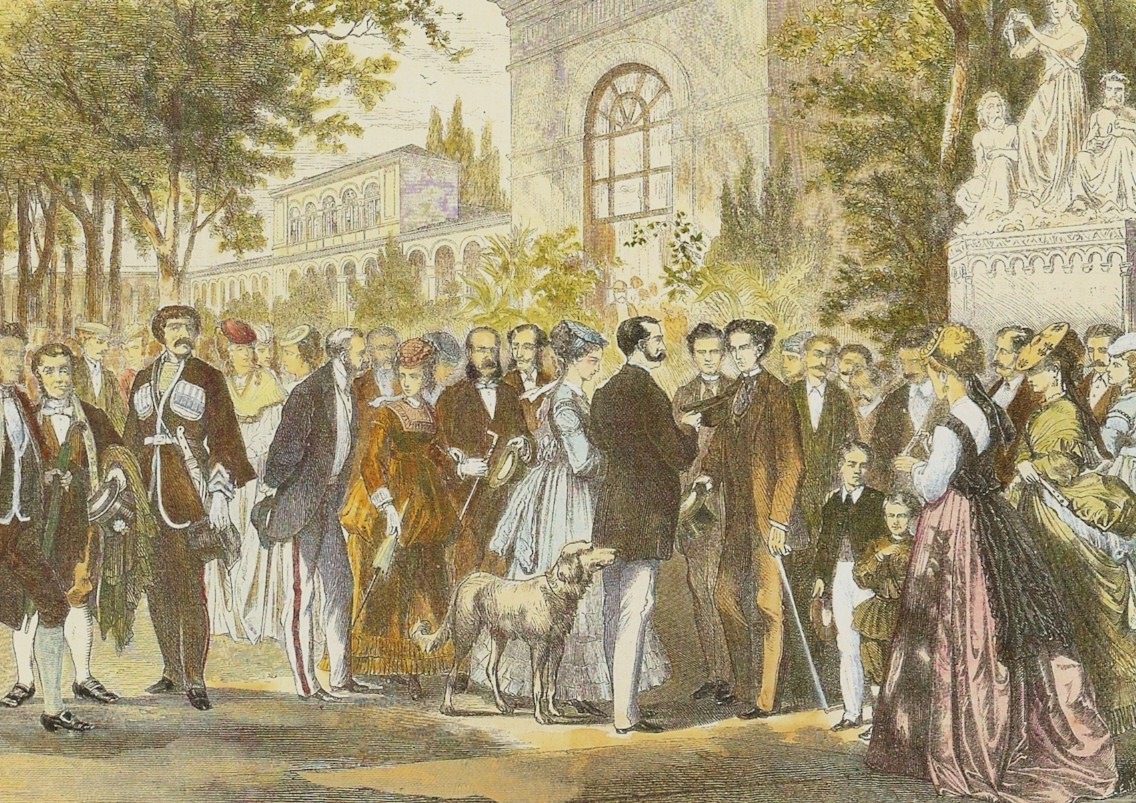
Tsar Alexander II of Russia (centre, with hat in his hand) and king Ludwig II of Bavaria in 1868

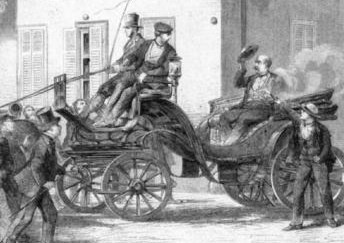
Eduard Kullmann (right) shoots at Otto von Bismarck in 1874.

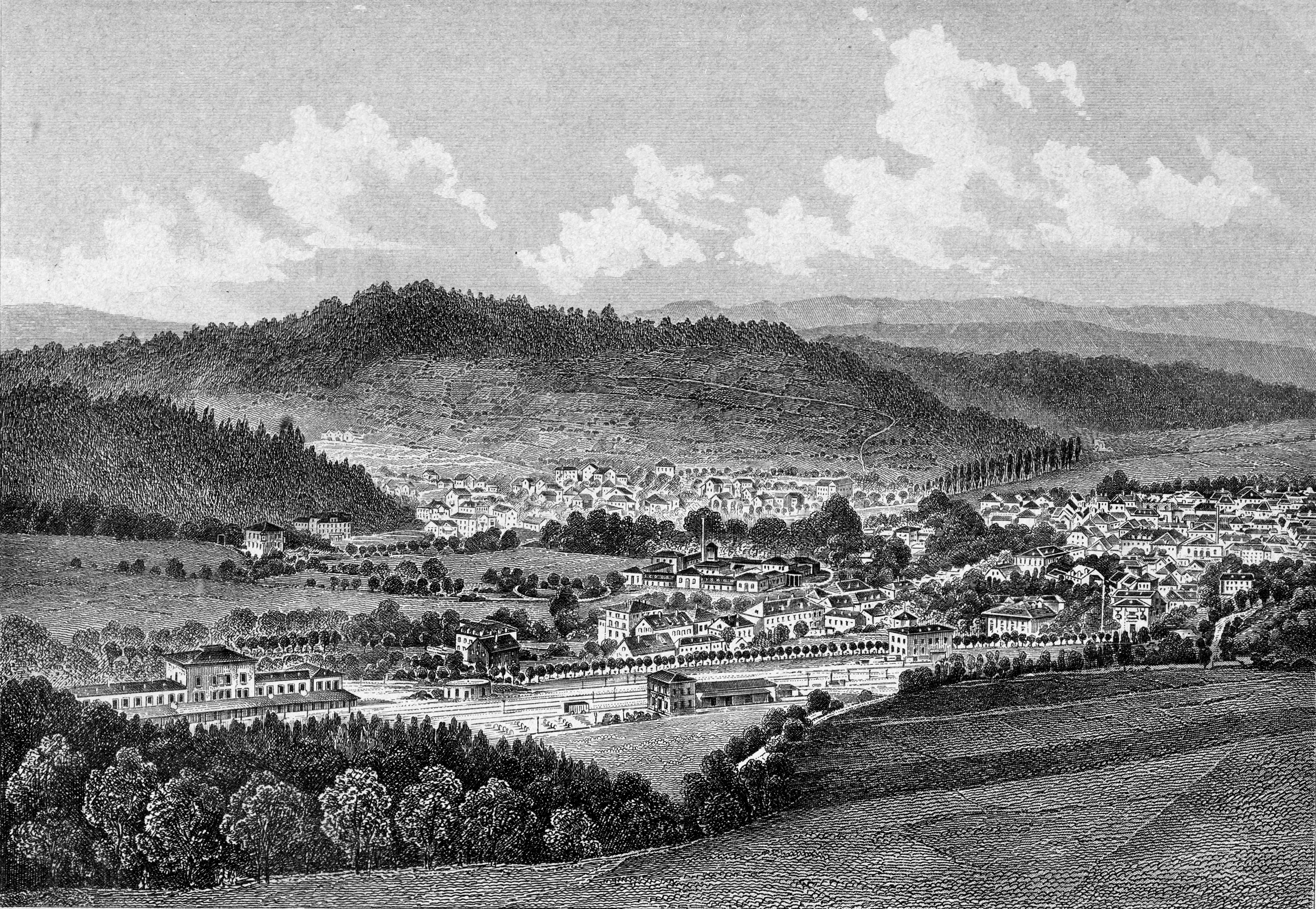
Bad Kissingen with its new station (left), about 1875

== Spa town ==
There are 7 mineral springs in Bad Kissingen, all of which are still used today. All but the Schönborn spring are cold, containing high levels of sodium, carbonates, and sulphates. The springs are located in the Kissingen-Haßfurt fault zone, absorbing minerals from Permian aged sediment layers.

Bad Kissingen was one of the leading spas in the 19th and early 20th century, which in German are called "Weltbad". They differ from other spa resorts mainly through the following criteria:

- Entertainment: The social life in a "Weltbad" is at least as important as the medical cure, or even more. A "Weltbad" offered many opportunities for the spa guests to spend their free time, such as exercise and sports, trips to the surroundings, theater and concert, library and games.
- Guests: The "Weltbad" was attractive to guests from all five continents. Particular attention was paid to prominent visitors, who attracted more visitors, especially from nobility and upscale middle class.
- Architecture: There are spa quarter, quarters with villas, areas for business and care, gardens and parks with a smooth transition into the surrounding landscape
- Infrastructure and supply: Despite the small number of inhabitants, a "Weltbad" offered the guests all the contemporary comfort, which was not even common in all major cities. These include good transport connections, communication facilities (such as telegraphy and telephone on the latest state of the art), luxury goods offer, differentiated hotel and gastronomy as well as state-of-the-art technology for energy supply, water supply and sanitation.

== Geography ==
=== Subdivision ===
In addition to the main town of Bad Kissingen, its districts include (with population numbers given in brackets, as of 1 January 2011):

- Albertshausen (624)
- Arnshausen (1,244)
- Bad Kissingen (11,003)
- Garitz (4,557)
- Hausen (1,704)
- Kleinbrach (375)
- Poppenroth (876)
- Reiterswiesen (2,103)
- Winkels (1,378)

== Climate ==
Climate data for Bad Kissingen (1991–2020 normals)
Month	Jan	Feb	Mar	Apr	May	Jun	Jul	Aug	Sep	Oct	Nov	Dec	Year
Mean daily maximum °C (°F)	3.3 (37.9)	5.0 (41.0)	9.9 (49.8)	15.3 (59.5)	19.4 (66.9)	22.7 (72.9)	25.0 (77.0)	24.7 (76.5)	19.7 (67.5)	13.6 (56.5)	7.3 (45.1)	3.8 (38.8)	14.1 (57.4)
Daily mean °C (°F)	0.7 (33.3)	1.5 (34.7)	5.1 (41.2)	9.5 (49.1)	13.5 (56.3)	16.8 (62.2)	18.7 (65.7)	18.2 (64.8)	13.8 (56.8)	9.1 (48.4)	4.5 (40.1)	1.5 (34.7)	9.4 (48.9)
Mean daily minimum °C (°F)	−1.9 (28.6)	−1.8 (28.8)	0.8 (33.4)	3.9 (39.0)	7.7 (45.9)	11.0 (51.8)	12.9 (55.2)	12.5 (54.5)	8.9 (48.0)	5.4 (41.7)	2.0 (35.6)	−0.8 (30.6)	5.1 (41.2)
Average precipitation mm (inches)	59.5 (2.34)	45.0 (1.77)	45.1 (1.78)	34.2 (1.35)	60.6 (2.39)	58.7 (2.31)	76.6 (3.02)	59.2 (2.33)	49.3 (1.94)	53.3 (2.10)	56.9 (2.24)	68.7 (2.70)	665.8 (26.21)
Average precipitation days (≥ 1.0 mm)	16.4	13.8	14.1	11.9	13.4	14.0	14.5	13.5	12.1	15.3	16.5	18.1	173.1
Average snowy days (≥ 1.0 cm)	9.8	6.7	2.3	0.1	0	0	0	0	0	0	1.3	5.2	25.4
Average relative humidity (%)	85.4	81.3	75.0	67.8	70.7	70.9	70.8	72.2	78.6	85.7	88.9	88.5	78.0
Mean monthly sunshine hours	42.0	70.7	121.4	176.8	204.2	217.2	226.5	209.2	148.9	92.2	39.6	28.6	1,590.8
Source: World Meteorological Organization

== Governance ==
=== Mayors ===
- Franz Meinow (1910–1947): 1945–1946
- Franz Rothmund (1873–1954): 1946–1947
- Karl Fuchs (1881–1972): 1947–1952
- Hans Weiß (1919–2008): 1952–1984
- Georg Straus (1926–2014): 1984–1990
- Christian Zoll (1941–2017): 1990–2002
- Karl Heinz Laudenbach (born 1957): 2002–2008
- Kay Blankenburg (born 1957): 2008–2020
- Dirk Vogel (born 1977): since 2020

=== Town Council ===
The Council of Bad Kissingen (2020–2026), elected on 15 March 2020:

- The mayor Dirk Vogel (Social Democratic Party of Germany, SPD)
- 9 members of the Christian Social Union of Bavaria (CSU)
- 6 members of the (SPD)
- 4 members of the Demokratische Bürger Kissingen (DBK, local group)
- 3 members of the Freie Wähler party, (Free voters)
- 4 members of the Bürger für Umwelt (BfU) /Alliance 90/The Greens /ödp
- 2 members of the Alternative for Germany (AfD)
- 1 member of the Left Party
- 1 member of the Zukunft Bad Kissingen (local group)

In May 2020, three members of the CSU changed to DBK. Since then, the CSU has had 6 members in the town council, the DBK seven.

== Twin towns ==
Bad Kissingen is twinned with:

- Eisenstadt, Austria (1978)
- Massa, Italy (1960)
- Vernon, France (1960)

== Arts and culture ==
=== Museums ===
- Bismarck-Museum in the Obere Saline (upper saltworks)
- Permanent exhibition: Jewish life in the former Jewish school
- Cardinal-Döpfner-Museum in Hausen

=== Music ===
- The classical music festival Kissinger Sommer with participation of internationally well known orchestras and soloists is a highlight of the cultural calendar.
- Kissinger Piano Olympics (Klavierolymp), a competition of young pianistes, related to the Kissinger Sommer, is held in autumn.
- Another music festival called the Kissinger Winterzauber takes place each winter.
- The national German brass band contest has been hosted in Bad Kissingen in 2014 and 2016.

=== Architecture ===
The Botenlauben Castle Ruins from 1180 overlooks Bad Kissingen from above. The old town hall is a renaissance architecture design from 1577. The town hall of today is the former mansion of the noble family von Heußlein, built by Johann Dientzenhofer in 1706.

Between 1838 and 1913, the arcade (Arkadenbau) was built around the spa garden by Friedrich von Gärtner, as well as the halls for the use of the mineral water ("Brunnenhalle") and for promenades ("Wandelhalle"), following a design by Max Littmann. Littmann also designed the Kurtheater Bad Kissingen, completed in 1905, and the concert hall Regentenbau, inaugurated in 1913.

The train station building was designed and supervised by Friedrich Bürklein. The Bad Kissingen Train station was constructed between 1871 and 1874.

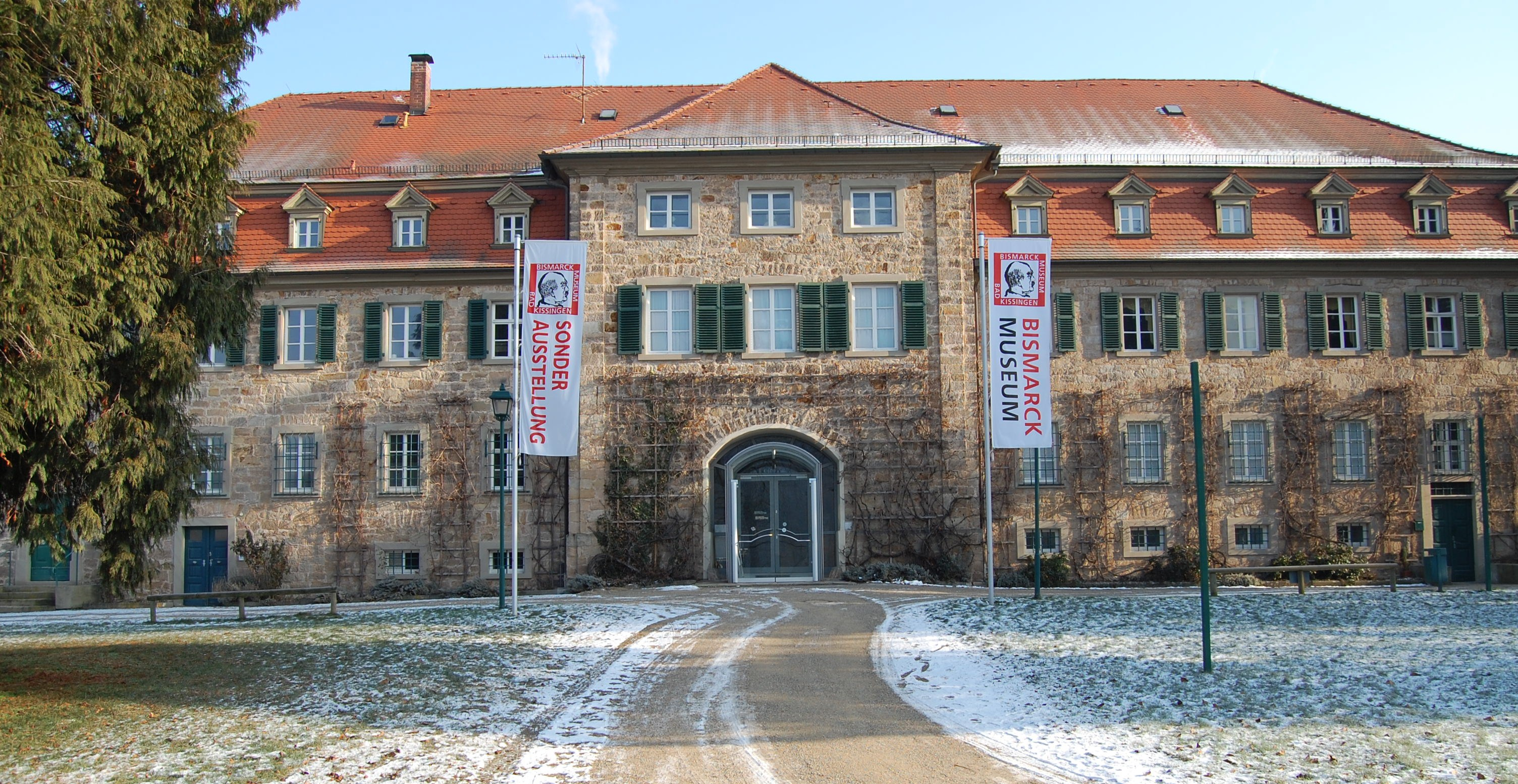
Bismarck-Museum

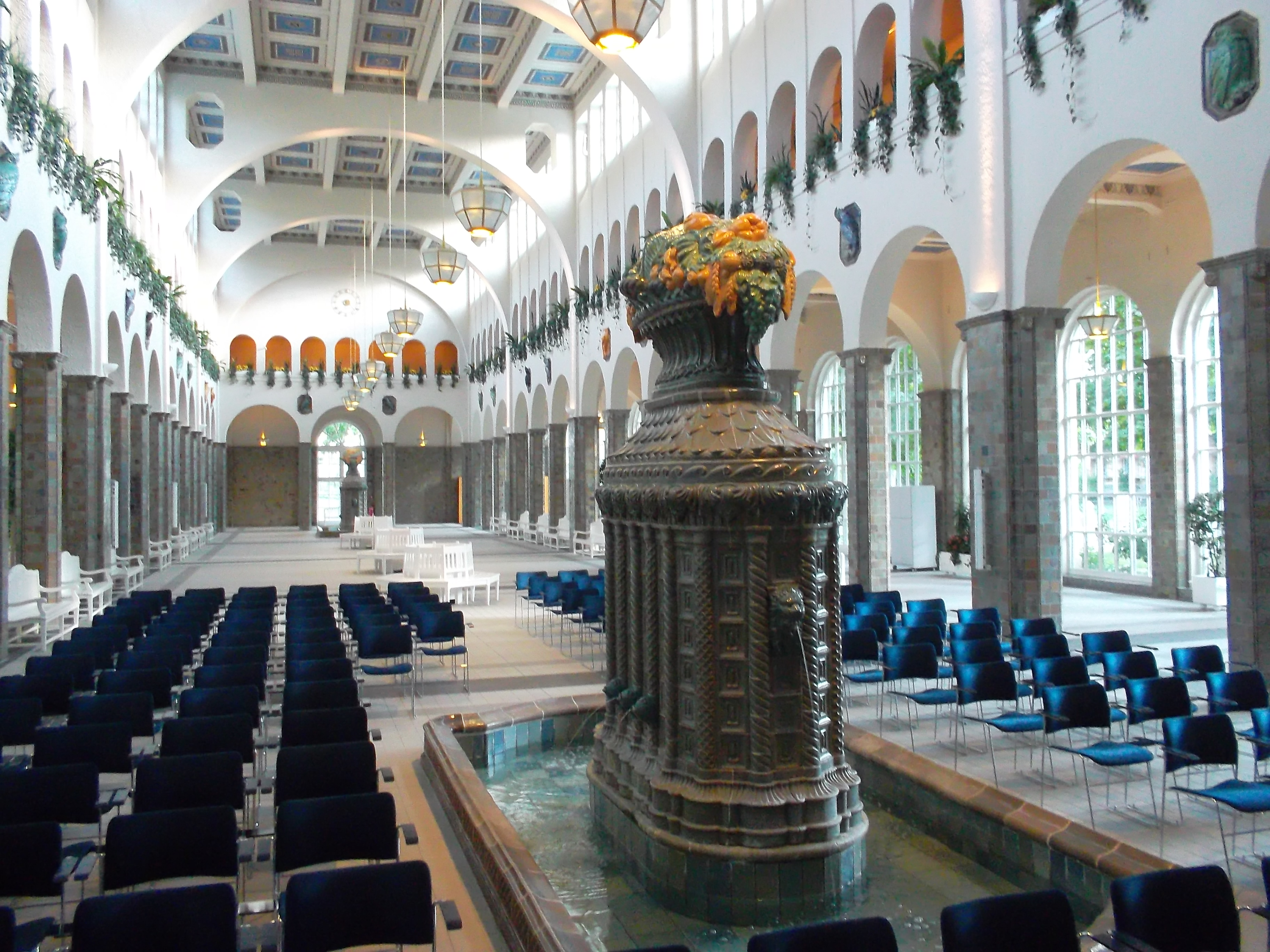
"Wandelhalle" in the spa area

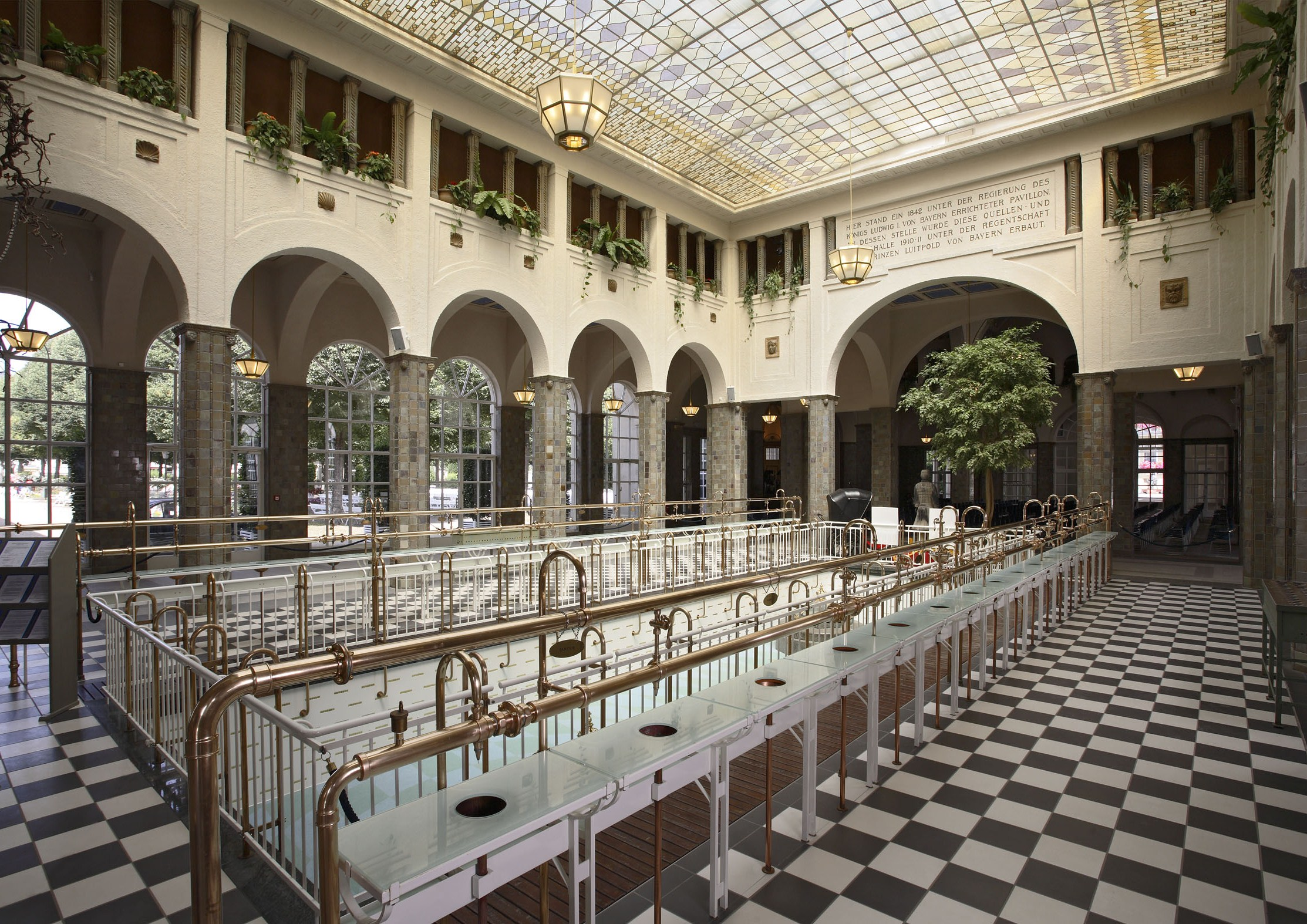
"Brunnenhalle" at the spa garden

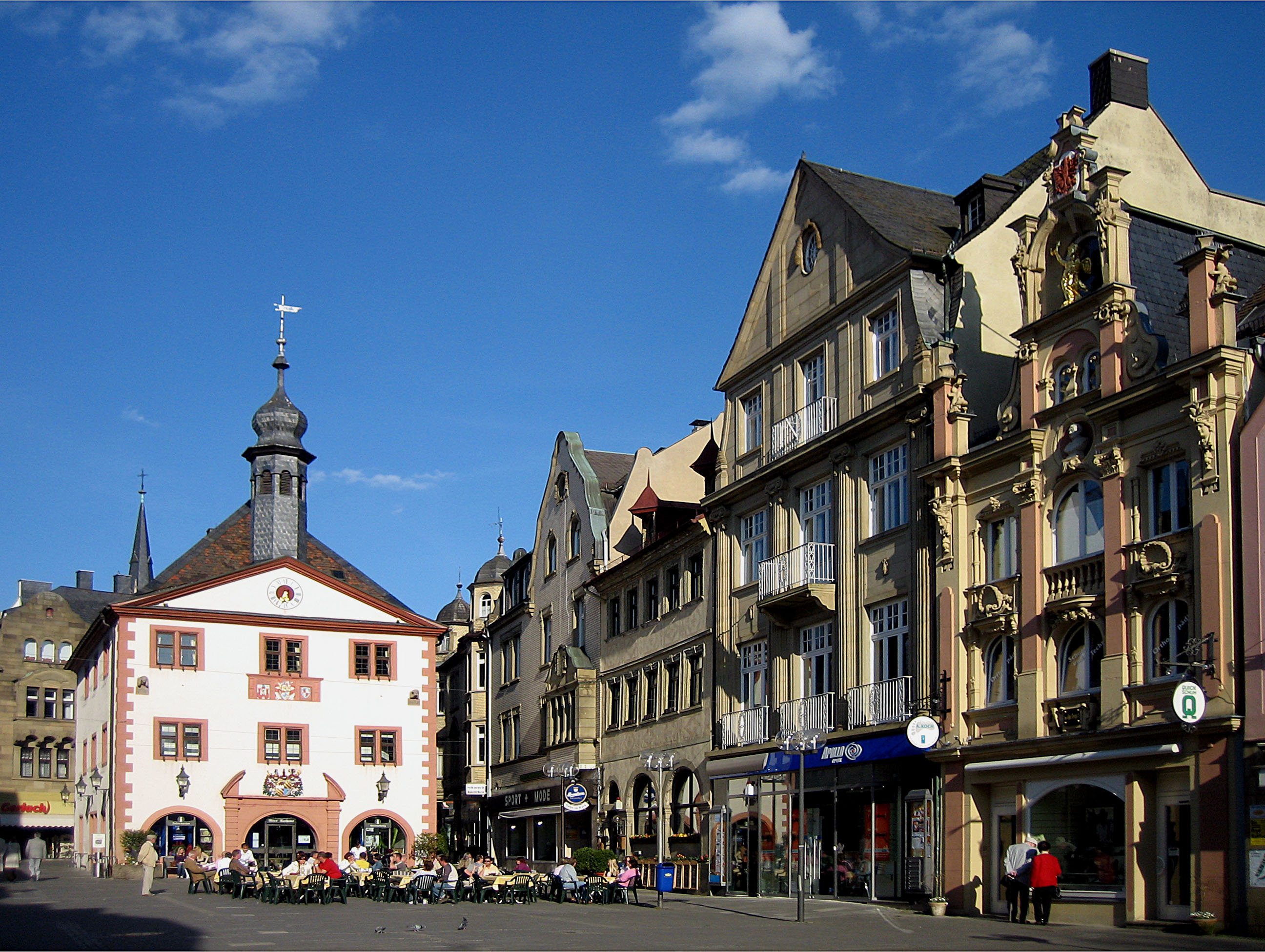
Old town hall and market square

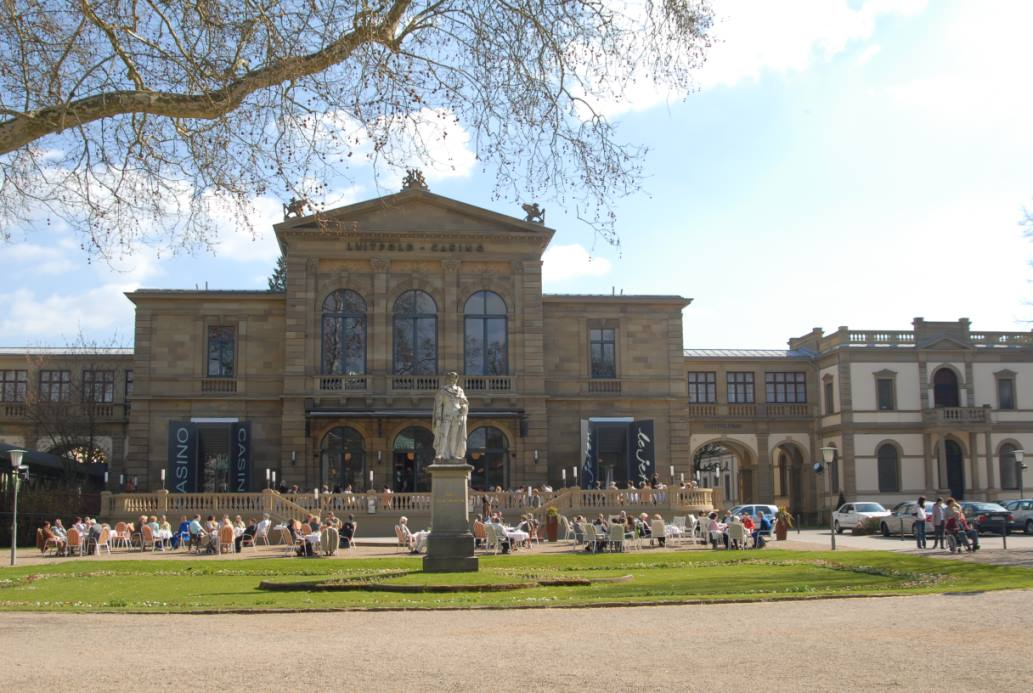
Casino Bad Kissingen

Other architectural attractions in Bad Kissingen include:

- Bismarck Monument (Bad Kissingen)
- Bismarck Tower (Bad Kissingen)
- Kapellenfriedhof
- Ludwig Tower (Bad Kissingen)
- Sisi Monument, commemorating Empress Elisabeth of Austria
- Wittelsbacher Tower (Bad Kissingen)

=== World Cup 2006 ===
During the World Cup 2006, Bad Kissingen was home to the Ecuador national team (the Croatia team was in Bad Brückenau). Sports facilities and infrastructure were upgraded for the team.

== Education ==
- Berufschule Bad Kissingen vocational school

== Notable people ==
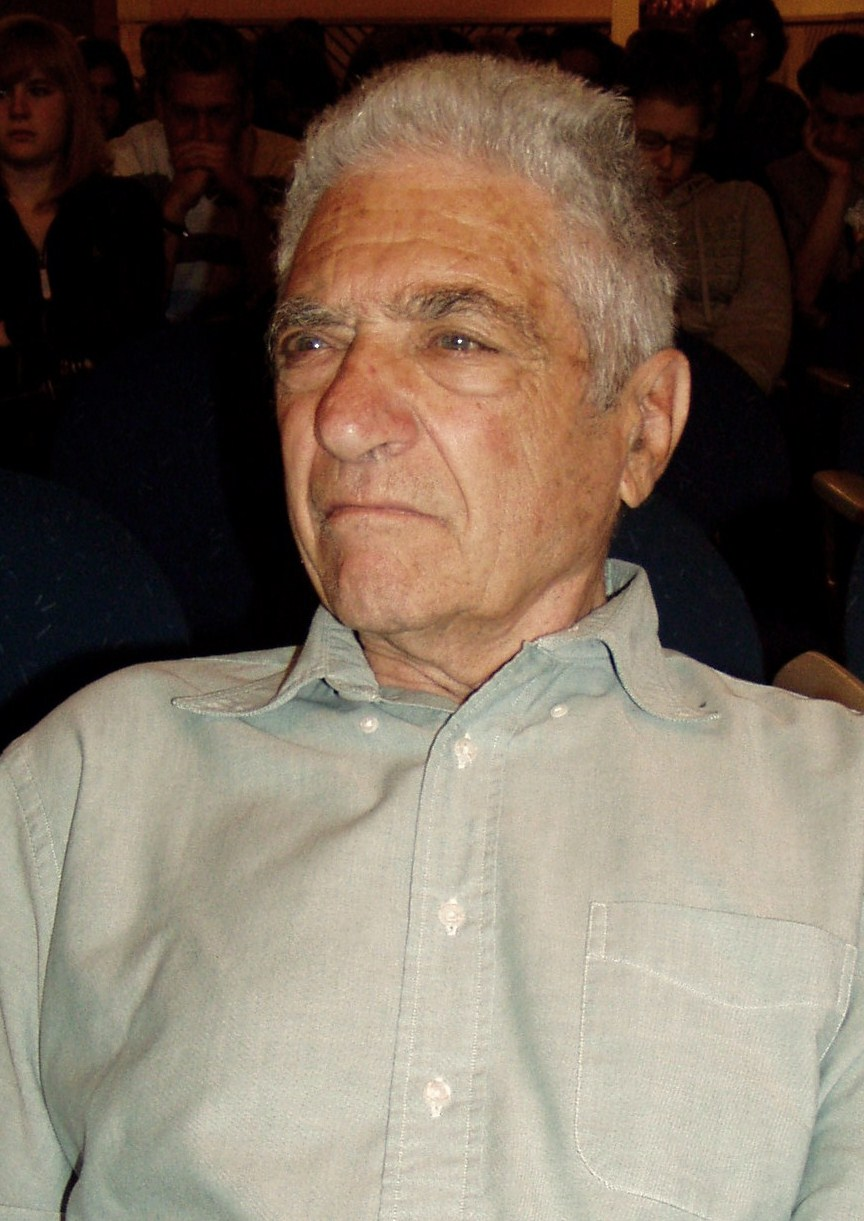
Jack Steinberger

- Jeff Baker (born 1981), MLB infielder on the Miami Marlins
- Otto von Botenlauben (1177–1245), Count of Henneberg, minnesinger and crusader
- Claus-Frenz Claussen (1939–2022), otolaryngologist
- Julius Döpfner (1913–1976), cardinal and archbishop of Munich and Freising
- Sir Dorabji Tata (1859-1932), a key figure in the history and development of the Tata Group died here
- Trong Hieu (born 1992), Vietnam Idol winner 2015
- Baptist Hoffmann (1863–1937), operatic baritone and voice teacher
- Cyrill Kistler (1848–1907), composer, music educator and music publisher
- Henry Kissinger's (1923–2023) great-great-grandfather, Meyer Löb, derived his name from Bad Kissingen in 1817
- Anton Kliegl (1872–1927), inventor of the Klieg light
- Oskar Panizza (1853–1921), physician and writer
- Hanna Ralph (1888–1978), stage and film actress
- Philipp Schmitt (1902–1950), SS commandant of Nazi prison camp executed for war crimes
- Jack Steinberger (1921–2020), physicist and Nobel Prize in Physics winner

== See also ==
- Neurootological and Equilibriometric Society
- Wichtelhöhlen (Bad Kissingen)
- Bad Schlema
