= Kapellenfriedhof =

Kapellenfriedhof Bad Kissingen
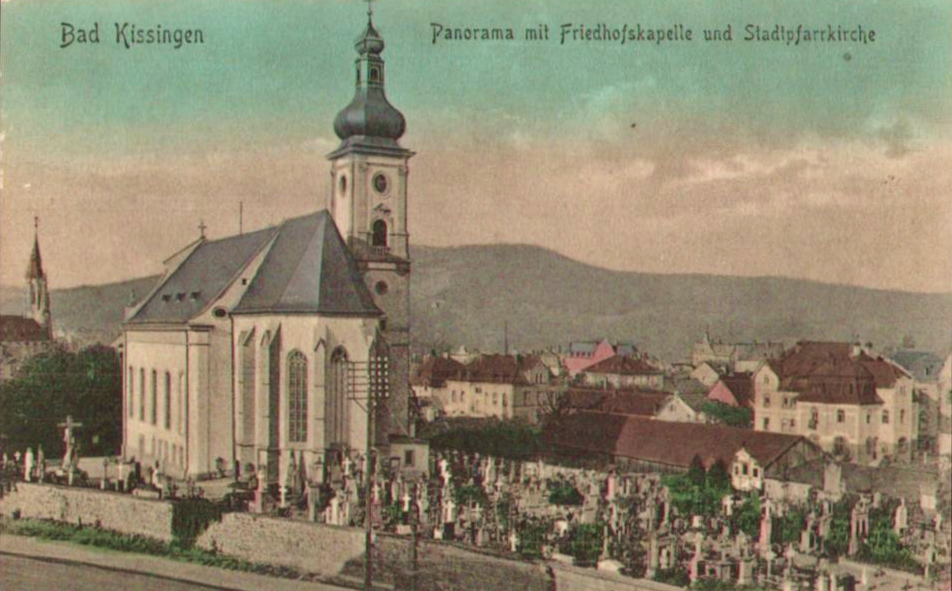
- Kapellenfriedhof (Chapel churchyard) of Bad Kissingen with the Marienkapelle (St. Mary Chapel)
- Interactive map of Kapellenfriedhof Bad Kissingen
- Location: Bad Kissingen
- Coordinates: 50.20167°N 10.08444°E
- Type: Monument

The Kapellenfriedhof is a historical churchyard in the Bavarian spa town of Bad Kissingen in the district of the same name in Lower Franconia.

It belongs to the architectural monuments of Bad Kissingen and is registered under the number D-6-72-114-26 in the Bavarian List of Monuments.

The historical Marienkapelle (St. Mary Chapel) belongs to the churchyard.

== History ==
=== Beginnings ===
The Kapellenfriedhof was first mentioned in 1348, when many residents of Kissingen fell victim to the plague. Around the same time, the Marienkapelle (St. Mary Chapel), which belongs to the churchyard, was built (though it is uncertain whether a potential first mention in 1286 refers to this chapel or to the St.-Jakobus-Kirche (St. James Church) in the town center of Bad Kissingen); the first definitive mention of the St. Mary Chapel also dates from the year 1348.

The churchyard’s first morgue, which no longer exists, was built in 1841.

The crucifix standing next to the Marienkapelle and including a Mater Dolorosa-depiction is made of sand stone and was built in the 18th century. It belongs to the architectural monuments of Bad Kissingen and is registered under the number D-6-72-114-26 in the Bavarian List of Monuments. It stands on a wide table base featuring a relief depiction of the sleeping Christ Child.

In 1855, the churchyard was expanded for the first time.

=== Battle of Kissingen ===
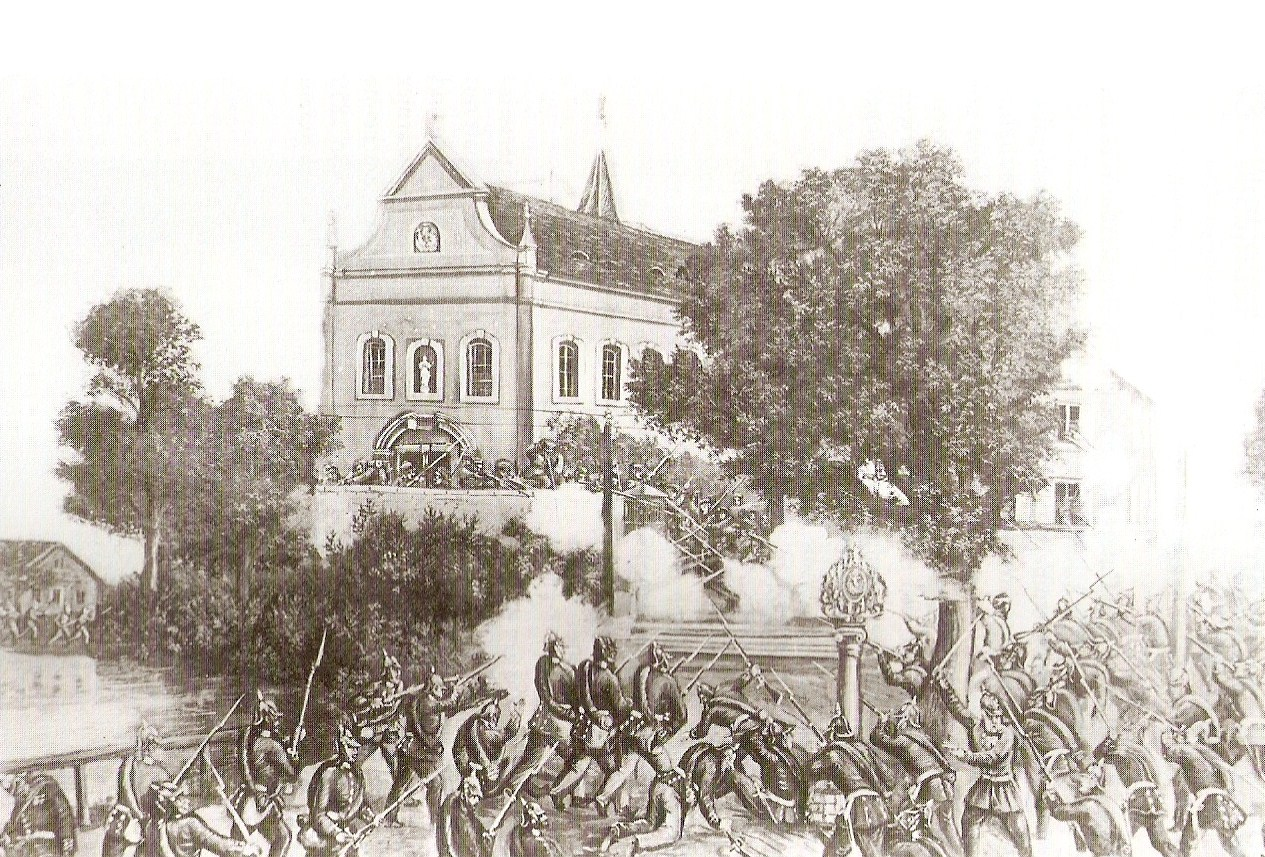
Contemporary post card portraying the Battle of Kissingen

During the Battle of Kissingen in the Austro-Prussian War, the Kapellenfriedhof was the scene of a skirmish on 10th July 1866. Due to the location of the Marienkapelle like a fortress between Kissingen on the one hand and Nüdlingen as well as Winkels (which now is a quarter of Bad Kissingen) on the other hand, Bavarian General Oskar von Zoller wanted to block the path to Nülingen and Winkels for the Prussian troops. 151 of the roughly 340 victims of the battle were buried on the Kapellenfriedhof (for an overview, see chapter „Tombs“) 63 victims were buried in the mass grave of the Germania monument, which was built in 1869 in the Kapellenstraße opposite to the Marienkapelle.

Chapel sacristan Kaspar Betzer, who was an ancestor of the later mayor of Münnerstadt, Ferdinand Betzer, was arrested by Prussian soldiers when he attempted to prevent the confinement of captured Bavarian soldiers inside the Marienkapelle. Betzer had locked the Marienkapelle to protect it from being plundered by the Prussian soldiers. After claiming in vain that he had given the key to his daughter, he finally had to hand it over. The writer Theodor Fontane, who does not mention the incident in his account of the German War, later secured compensation of 50 thalers for Betzer.

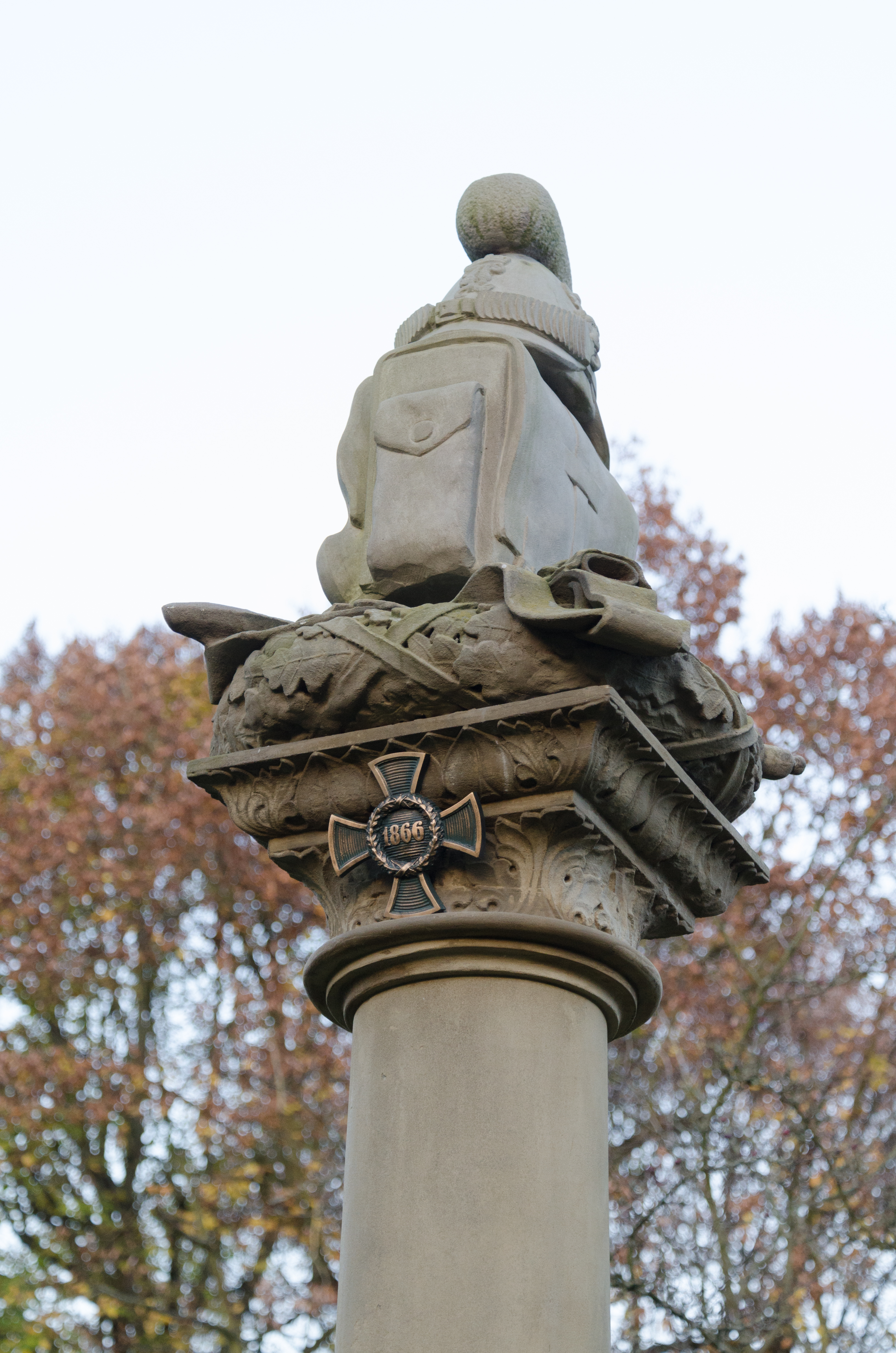
Memorial column (close-up)

Among the war tombs in the churchyard stands a commemorative column, which is topped with a Bavarian "caterpillar" helmet resting on a laurel wreath and a sword and dedicated to those who fell in the German War; it was, by all appearances, created by the sculptor Michael Arnold.During a renovation in 2001, its location was shifted slightly.

In the chest of the figure of the Virgin Mary, which is also made of sand stone and stands in front of the crucifix located next to the Marienkapelle, there is a hole containing traces of lead. Legend has it that the hole originated during the Austro-Prussian War, when a Prussian soldier shot at a Bavarian soldier standing on the base of the crucifix from the Western entrance of the Kapellenfriedhof. According to another version of the legend, the Prussian soldier deliberately fired at the figure of the Virgin Mary. As local heritage curator Werner Eberth explains, the hole containing traces of lead solder likely originated from a sword or dagger (part of a Mater Dolorosa-depiction) that was once attached to the figure of Mary; this sword (or dagger) was eventually lost to theft.

=== From the 19th Century to the Present ===
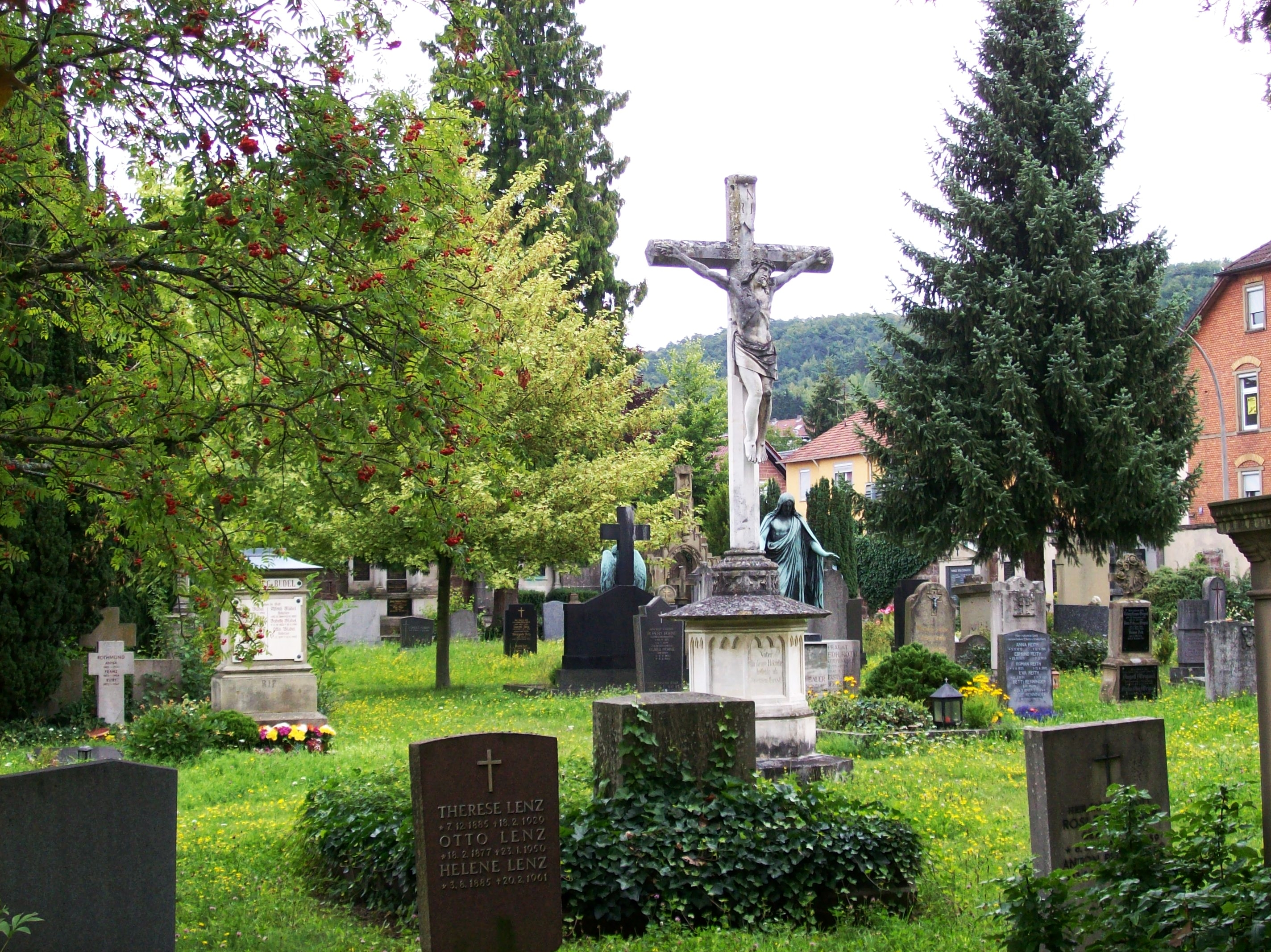
Crucifix (1890)

In the year 1890, the Kapellenfriedhof was expanded for another time, with which it reached its today's expansion. In this context, sculptor Valentin Weidner built another crucifix, which was consecrated on 27th September 1890.. It belongs to the architectural monuments of Bad Kissingen and is registered under the number D-6-72-114-26 in the Bavarian List of Monuments. As the local newspaper Saale-Zeitung reported on September 30th 1890, “the figure of Christ […] is deeply moving”; the six-meter-tall crucifix, carved from Abensberg limestone, “does great credit to Mr. Weidner.” The Neo-Gothic crucifix stands on an octagonal pedestal featuring pilaster strips and tracery ornamentation. A distinctive feature is that the shaft of the cross is also octagonal. The signature located at the lowest step of the cross is severely weathered through the raising of the ground in the context of renovation in the 1980ies.

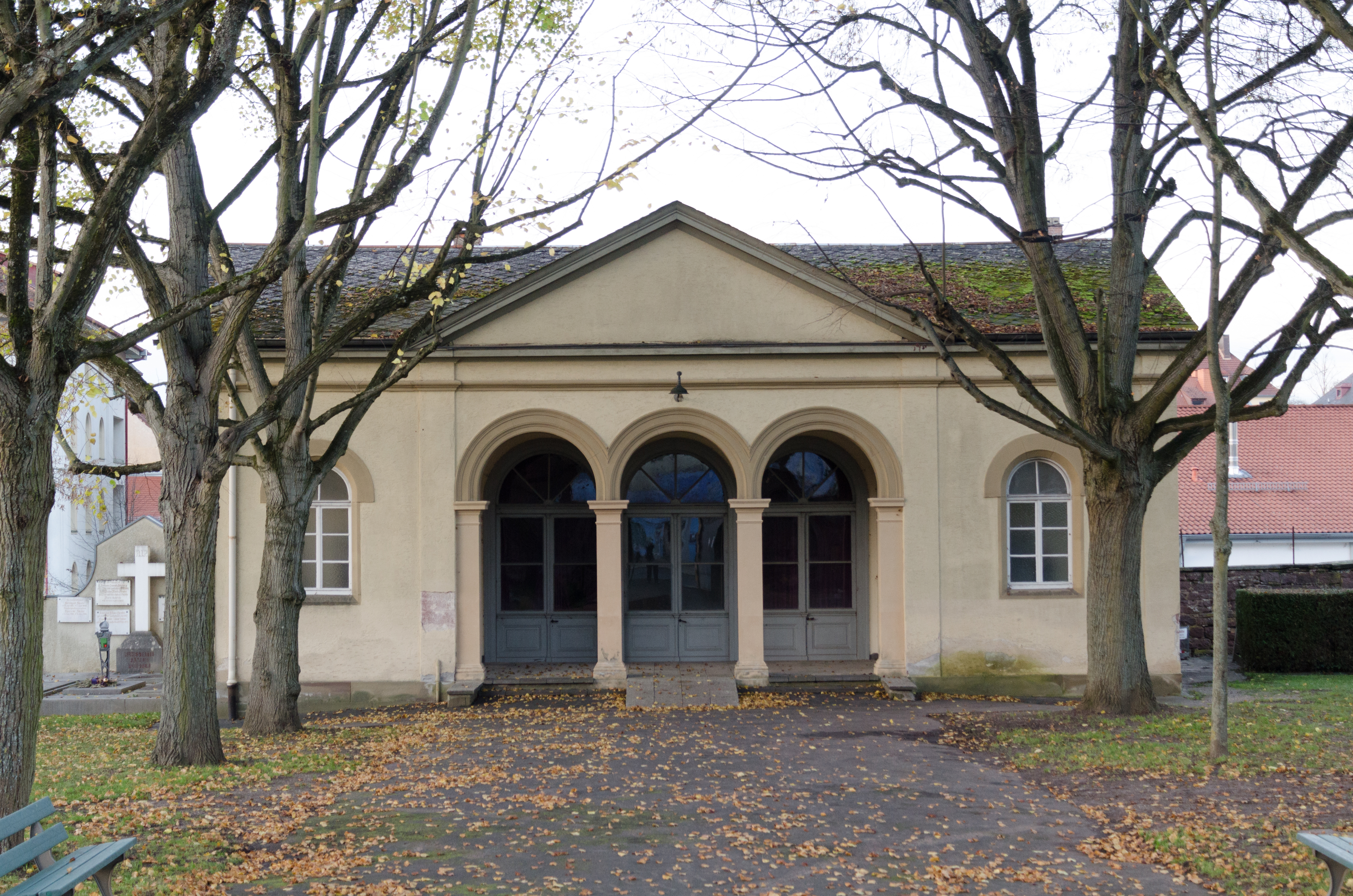
Leichenhalle (1890)

Also dating from the churchyard expansion of 1890 is the current morgue, which had already been planned in 1885. It belongs to the architectural monuments of Bad Kissingen and is registered under the number D-6-72-114-26 in the Bavarian List of Monuments. The single-story building with a gabled roof was built by architect Jakob Hergenröder in the round-arch style. Its entrance area features a central triangular pediment positioned above a triple-arched arcade.

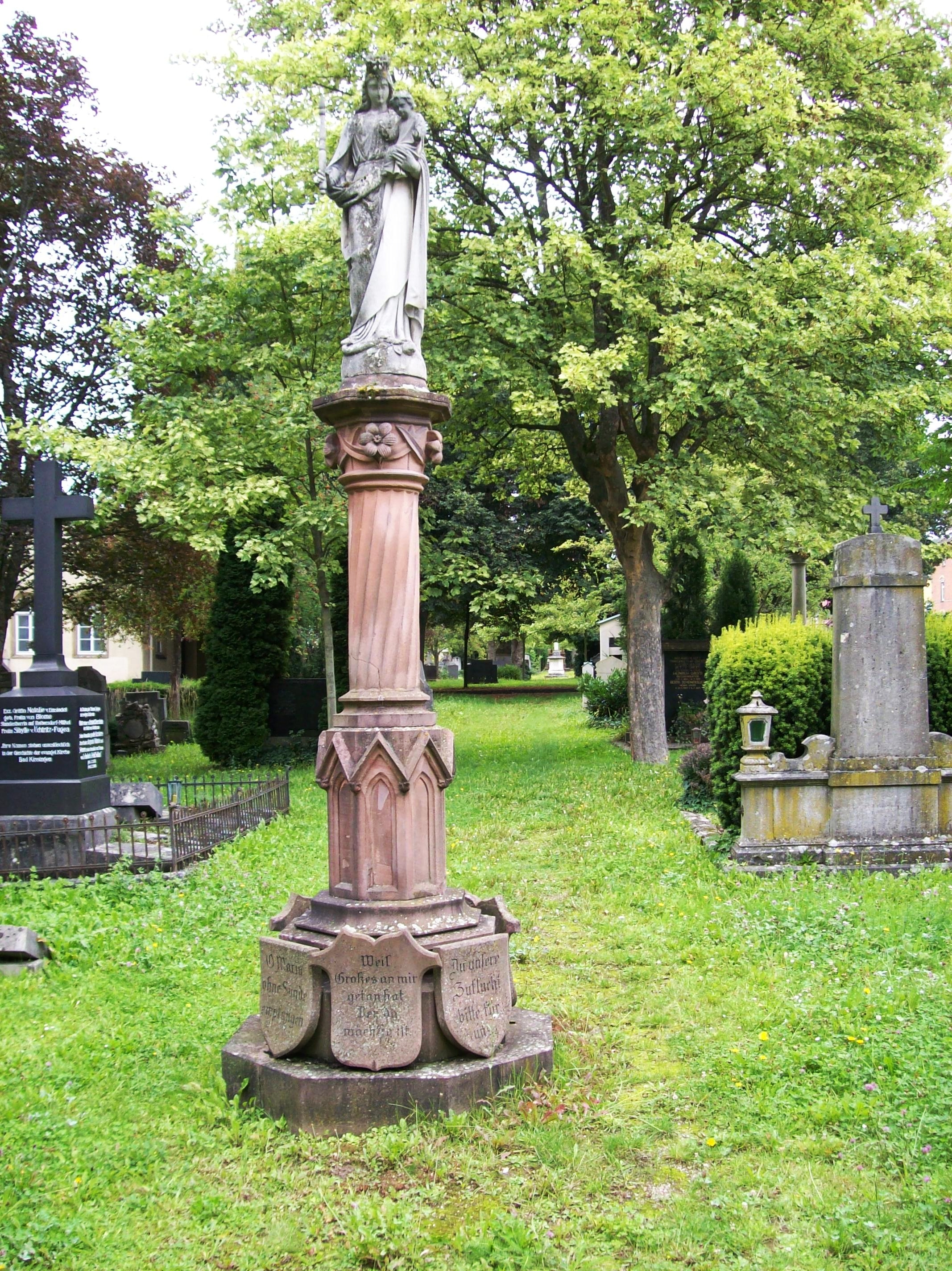
Marian column created by Valentin Weidner (1905)

The Kapellenfriedhof harbours a Marian column created by sculptor Valentin Weidner in the year 1905. It belongs to the architectural monuments of Bad Kissingen and is registered under the number D-6-72-114-26 in the Bavarian List of Monuments. This is a Neo-Gothic figure of the Madonna, standing on a twisted column above a pedestal encircled by a coat of arms. The Marian column was originally erected in 1905 at the Marienplatz in front of the Herz-Jesu-Stadtpfarrkirche. It was removed in 1958 and replaced with a St. Mary statue from 1716 made of sand stone. First, Weidner's St. Mary statue (without column, which remained with the Sacred Heart parish) came into the recreation home for English Ladies in Kirchehrenbach, who ran an institute next to the Herz-Jesu-Stadtpfarrkirche. When the recreation home in Kirchehrenbach was closed, the English Ladies and the town of Bad Kissingen made an agreement about bringing the St. Mary statue back to the Kapellenfriedhof. The Sacred Heart parish gave the rests of the column over to the town of Bad Kissingen. Several alternatives for the location (directly at the Liebfrauensee [Lake of Our Lady], in front of the Marienkapelle, in front of the former morgue) were discarded. The Marian column was finally placed on the east-west axis of the churchyard, so that the Marian column and Weidner's crucifix from 1890 are positioned almost as mirror images of each other across the transverse axis. The Torsten Göbel stonemasonry business in Bad Kissingen was ordered to complete the damaged St. Mary statue and carved a new column base out of red sandstone based on Weidner's template. The new version of the statue became a little lower than the original statue. During a May devotion service on May 29, 1994, the new Marian column was rededicated, with representatives of the "Englische Fräulein" (Institute of the Blessed Virgin Mary) in attendance.

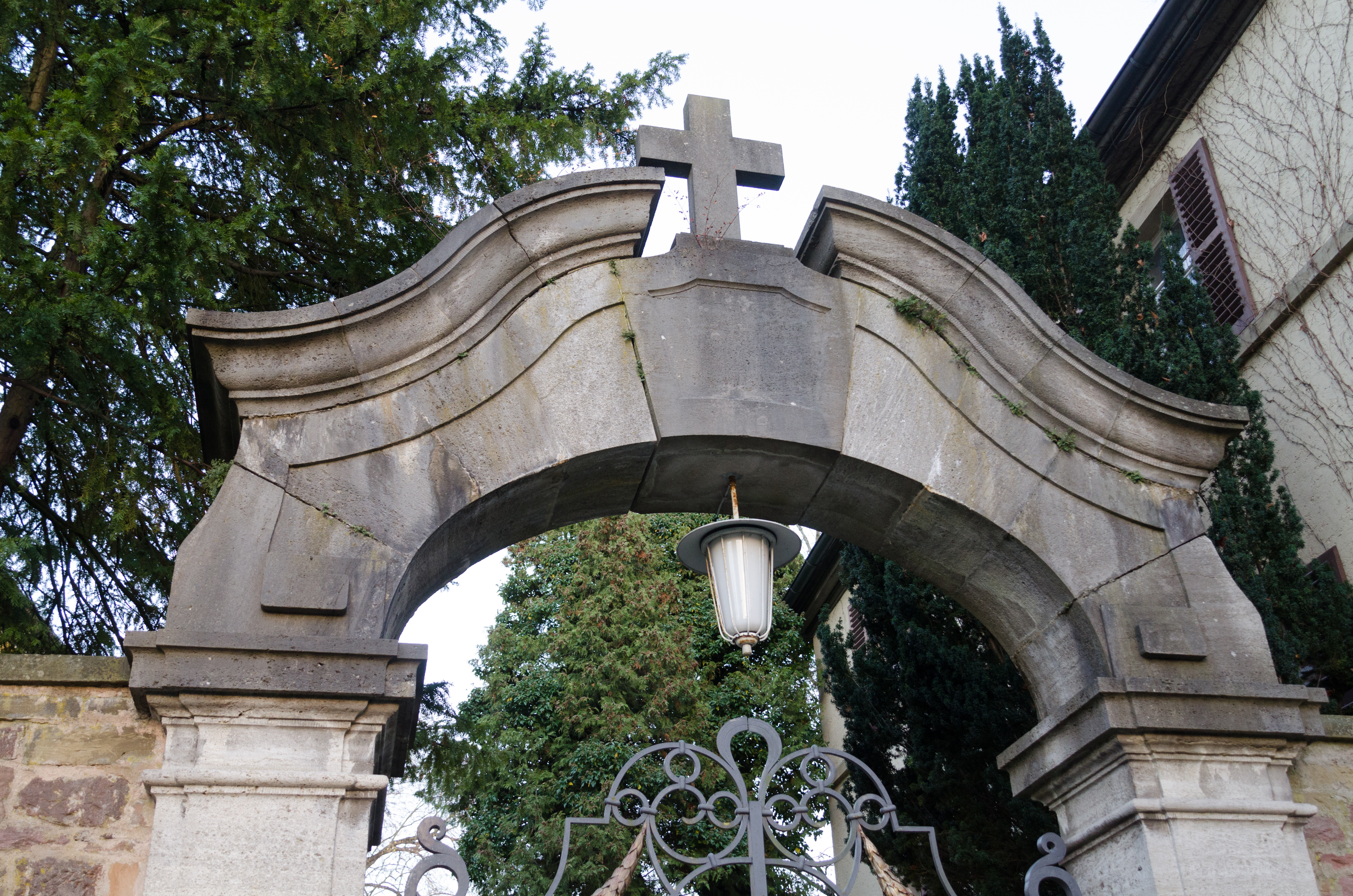
Torbogen (1909)

The Baroque-style archway, which leads to the churchyard of 10.000 m² in size, was built in 1909.

An expansion planned in the years 1925 to 1929 did not take place, as the Parkfriedhof at the mountain of Sinnberg was built.

Especially during the 19th century, the tombs became more and more elaborate with the growing wealth of the people who were buried here,. Many of the tombs on the Kapellenfriedhof were created by sculptor Valentin Weidner, such as the tomb Huß, the crypts of the families Leo Schmitt and Hartmann, thw crypt of the Vogel family as well as the tomb of Anton Straus. His son Hans Weidner created the family graves Pabst (1892), Albert (1910) and Haemmel (1911). Father and son Weidner may have created further tombs on the Kapellenfriedhof, but possibly no more signatures can be found due to weathering and overgrowing.

=== Present ===
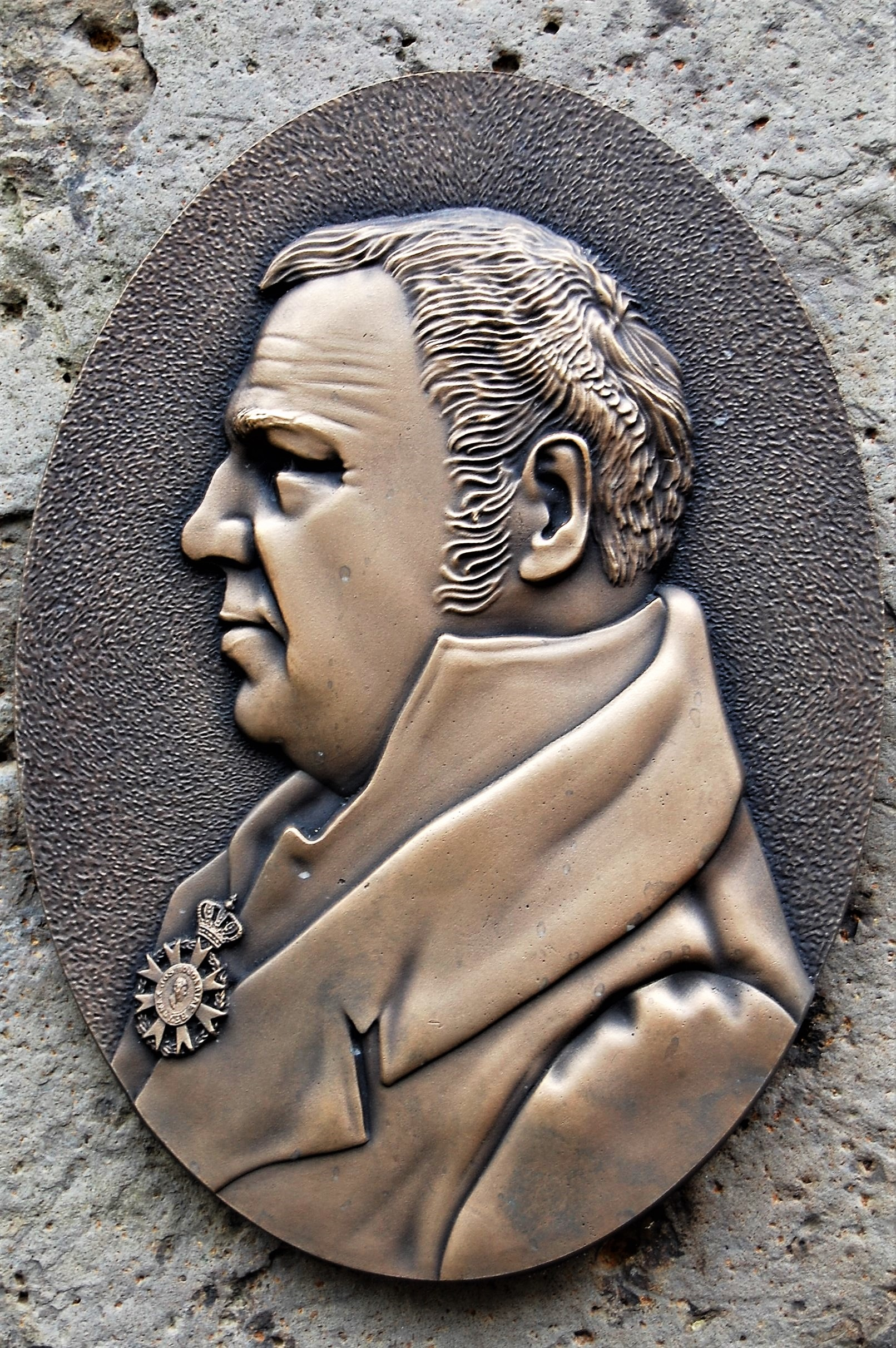
Matthias von Flurl Monument (2017, close-up shot)

In 1980, the final burial took place at the chapel churchyard, for reasons related to water protection regulations. Since then, it has been tended to with great care and restraint—an approach intended, according to the urban planning department, to reflect “the process of emergence and decay over the decades, as well as the stages of aging and dying.” In 2012, the town of Bad Kissingen reduced the number of graves in the churchyard by 30. In 2014, district heritage curator Werner Eberth founded a civic initiative through which volunteers from Bad Kissingen tend to the graves at the Kapellenfriedhof.

On 15th July 2017, a monument to saltworks inspector Mathias von Flurl was unveiled at the churchyard. He had died on 27th July 1823 on a stroke during a stay in the Oberen Saline in Hausen (today a quarter of Bad Kissingen) and was buried at the Kapellenfriedhof.

== Tombs ==
=== War tombs ===
The Kapellenfriedhof harbours, among others, the tombs of the following soldiers killed in the Battle of Kissingen (list in alphabetical order):

Name	Military rank	Tomb	Note
August Becker	Prussian musketeer	rahmenlos	The tomb of August Becker (8th September 1841 in Dützen – 10th July 1866), which is unusual for the rank of a musketeer, is located at the northern wall of the churchyard. The tomb inscription could be understood also in the way that, apart from August Becker, 35 more soldiers are buried in the tomb. The character of the tomb, however, makes it hard to imagine that 36 dead persons are buried here.
Paul Brzosowski	Lieutenant, 6th Westphalian Infantry Regiment No. 55	rahmenlos	Lieutenant Paul Brzosowski was killed by Bavarian bullets. Lieutenant Carl von Rex from the same infantry as well as Fusilier W. Schuermann III and Sergeant Schmitt from Aschersleben are buried in the same tomb.
Heinrich Buchheit	Bavarian Soldier		Heinrich Buchheit's tomb stone has meanwhile disappeared and was located for a long time during the postwar period on the Northern wall of the churchyard in the West of August Becker's tomb. It is certain that the city of Bad Kissingen had the tomb stone removed but it is unclear when and why this happened.
Eugen Dewalt	One-year Volunteer	rahmenlos	Eugen Dewalt was a conscript with GCSE diploma, who performed his voluntary military service as presence service in a troop part of his choice.
Franz Doyesez	Conscientious Objector		Franz Doyesez, who was born in 1840 in Trzebnica in Silesia, had fleed in order to avoid service in the army. During his work as pharmacist in the Boxberger-Apotheke (Untere Marktstraße 12 in Bad Kissingen), he was fatally struck in the heart by a piece of shrapnel.
Michael Hergenröther	House servant in the Russischer Hof hotel (today: Kurhausstraße 9)		According to his employer Panizza (mother of the writer Oskar Panizza), Hergenröther was killed when he tried to help the Bavarian soldiers.
Wilhelm Lüders	Prussian Captain	rahmenlos	Wilhelm Lüders was wounded during the battle and succumbed to his injuries on 9th August 1866.
Friederich Johann Ernst Freiherr Reitzenstein-Hartungs	Captain in the 12th Infantry Regiment „König Otto von Griechenland“	rahmenlos	Friederich Freiherr Reitzenstein-Hartungs (4. November 1823 or 1825 in Kronach, 10. July 1866). One shot shattered his shoulder, while another shot hurt his liver. The liver injury finally caused his death. He died shortly after he had been brought to Kissingen. According to his wishes he received a special tomb stone, which was erected by sculptor J. Lang from Bayreuth.
Carl von Rex	Lieutenant, 6th Westphalian Infantry Regiment No. 55	rahmenlos	Leutnant Carl von Rex was killed by Prussian cannon. Leutnant Paul Brzosowski from the same infantry as well as Fusilian W. Schuermann III und Seargant Schmitt aus Aschersleben are buried in the same tomb.
Carl Heinrich August Rohdewald	Major	rahmenlos	Major Rohdewald (1821 in Detmold; 10. July 1866) is the officer with the secomd-highest rank on the Kapellenfriedhof. He was killed at 6:30 pm during the battle on the summit of the Schlegelberg pass between Winkels and Nüdlingen. The sarcophagus-like tomb is equipped with a hoplite helmet and a short sword. It was erected by his colleagues and provided with an inscription. In April 2009, Anneliese Kuhnt, citizen of Bad Kissingen, gave an order to sculptor Ludwig Bauer from Aschach to replace the hoplite helmet which had been stolen shortly earlier. In his war report, Theodor Fontane describes in detail the circumstances of Major Rohdewald's death. Furthermore, he mentions it in his novel Eine Frau in meinen Jahren.
Georg Schmidt	Corporal in the 6th Battalion		
Ignaz Thoma	Captain Second Class		As a Bavarian combat commander, Captain Ignaz Thoma (1820 in Kaufbeuren, 10th July 1866) was responsible to defend the Kapellenfriedhof against the Prussians. He had to give up after two hours and got a lethal wound on his way to Winkels.
Colmar von Uthmann	First Lieutenant, Company Commander, 6th Company II Battalion 2nd Posen Infantry Regiment No. 19		
Eduard Warnberg	Bavarian Officer of the Royal Bavarian 2nd Infantry Regiment „Kronprinz“	rahmenlos	Warnberg (1827 in Ansbach, 29. July 1866) was wounded during the battle and died aged 39 in the hospital Hotel Schlatter in the Max Street wich last was a vocational school. In all probability, the tomb stone was erected by the sculptor Michael Arnold, by whom a draft of similar design is known.
Anton Weichselberger	Lieutenant in the Royal Bavarian 2nd Infantry Regiment	rahmenlos	In comparison to most other tombs, the inscription on this tomb already is deeply weathered.
August von Zwehl	Captain		Due to weathering, the town of Bad Kissingen had the tombstone restored in the year 2016.

=== Historical Personalities ===
The Kapellenfriedhof harbours, among others, the tombs of the following personalities (list in alphabetical order):

Name	Description	Tomb	Note
Augsburg Deaconesses			Nuns' tomb
Franz Anton von Balling (1800–1875)	German balneologist, spa doctor, and entrepreneur	rahmenlos	The tomb stone created by sculptor Valentin Weidner was appreciated by the local newspaper Saale-Zeitung on 12th July 1881 as „excellent ornament“. Dr Balling's tomb bust was stolen in the 1980ies. The bust was to be reconstructed following the model of the bust also created by Weidner at the park Ballinghain; however, this has failed to happen up to now (2022). The remaining bust portrays Balling's wife Anna. The town of Bad Kissingen had the tomb renovated.
Family tomb Bauer			The tomb was created in 1897 and bears sculptor Weidner's signature „VW“. Such as the family tomb Collard, it is totally made of Muschelkalk.
Gustav von Blome (1829–1906)	German-born diplomat in Austrian service and politician	rahmenlos	The tomb was created in 1906 and bears sculptor Valentin Weidner's signature „VW“. The tomb bears a black cross made of marble and resembles this way the tomb Kralert. However, the tomb Blome is higher.
Familiengrab Boxberger: Georg Anton Boxberger (1679–1765); Karl August Boxberger (1808–1880); Franz Seraph Boxberger (1842–1914)	Pharmacist family in Kissingen		
Familiengrab Braunwart			The simple tomb was created in 1905, is located in the South of the Marienkapelle, and is made of bright limestone. The only lime-plastic equipment of the tomb is the plastic tondo „ecce homo“ made of clay. The base bears sculptor Valentin Weidner's signature „VW“.
Family tomb Georg Büdel			The tomb was created in 1894, is made of sandstone and bears sculptor Valentin Weidner's signature. The cross which originally crowned this tomb was implemented onto the tomb at the Parkfriedhof.
Family tomb Collard			The powerfully designed family tomb was crated in 1885, is made of Muschelkalk and is located an the southern wall of the churchyard. Its construction mostly equals to the Gothic Revival architecture. The finial is missing. The tomb bears sculptor Valentin Weidner's signature „V. Weidner“.
Max von Coudenhove (1865–1928)	Austrian lawyer and diplomat		
Carl von Dapper (1863–1937)	German internal medicine physician, balneologist, and spa doctor	rahmenlos	
Wendelin Dietz (1847–1918)	Well doctor, Royal Bavarian Court Physician, Senior Staff Surgeon of the Royal Bavarian Landwehr		
Oskar von Diruf (1824–1912)	German balneologist and spa doctor	rahmenlos	The tomb was created by sculptor Michael Arnold in the year 1858. his authorship is proven by Arnold's ligated Signatur, a photograph in the album of his works created by Arnold as well as by the family tradition of the Diruf family. The tomb is dominated by the life size statue of Dr Gustav Diruf who died aged 45. Diruf's profession as a physicist is expressed by the Aesculapian snake on the column which belongs to the tomb. The tombstone for Olga Diruf (1870–1875), who died as a child, is designed as an open book page.
Sisters of Saint Elizabeth			
Friedrich Daniel Erhard (1800–1879)	German forensic pathologist, district physician and spa doctor	rahmenlos	
Sisters of the Redeemer			
Valentino Del Fabbro (1866–1915)	Italian handyman („Terrazziere“) and entrepreneur at Bad Kissingen	rahmenlos	
Family tomb Fay			This tomb is one of the first tombs at the Western entrance of the churchyard. it is made of red Sandstone and bears sculptor Valentin Weidner's signature „VW“. The tomb stone was probably shortened in height and was reused in the year 1942.
Mathias von Flurl (1756–1823)	Geologist, Saltworks Inspector		Saltworks Inspector Matthias von Flurl, who was a spa guest in Kissingen from 1818 to 1820, died on 27th July 1823 during an inspection trip in Hausen, which now is a quarter of Bad Kissingen. He was buried the same day. His tomb was equipped with a cast iron pyramid with an inscription. Members of his family had it restored after it was damaged during the Austro-Prussian War in 1866. The tomb vanished in the year 1883; it is no longer known where it was exactly located.
Donat Fuß	Mayor of the municipality of Bad Kissingen		The tomb was created by sculptor Michael Arnold. According to the report by the local newspaper Saale-Zeitung from 2nd May 1884, the tomb, which no longer exists, portrayed the deceased, »as one hand holds a bent-neck rosebud and the other one points toward the heavenly home«. In the album of his works, which was created by Arnold, however, there is a draft with the description »monument of the young lady Julie Röther at the churchyard in Kissingen«. According to local heritage curator Werner Eberth, Donat Fuß' tomb either did not look as described in the Saale-Zeitung, or Arnold used the draft a second time for Julie Röther's tomb.
Family tomb Gayde: Karl Ludwig Gayde (1844–1928); Karl Gayde (1882–1948)	painter		The tomb was created in 1900 and bears sculptor Valentin Weidner's signature „VW“. The tomb is of low height, is made of Muschelkalk and is equipped with two corner lanterns. It is towered above by an Egyptian-like stele with black marble slabs.
Family tomb Geyer			The powerfully built tomb was created in 1876 is located on the Northern wall and bears sculptor Valentin Weidner's sculpture „V. Weidner“. It is made of green sandstone and is designed in an antiquing style. It is crowned by an sitting angel. The angle's left wing is missing, which was allegedly knocked off by a falling branch.
August Gleissner (1860–1927)	Builder, architect		
Josef Gleissner (1869–1938)	Spa doctor, medical council		
Sebastian Goldwitz (1752–1824)	Doctor of Philosophy and Pharmaceutical Sciences, Town and District Physician		Epitaph on the outer wall of the Marienkapelle
Friedrich Wilhelm Grell (1866–1941)	Teacher, composer		
Otto von Gustedt (1839–1905)	Prussian officer and wing adjutant of the Prussian Crown Prince Friedrich Wilhelm	rahmenlos	
Family tomb Haas			The tomb was created in 1903, is located on the Southern wall of the churchyard and bears sculptor Valentin Weidner's signature „VW“. Iz is made of a broken marble column, on which an ivy tendril is climbing ip.
Max Hagen (1859–1914)	Painter		
Adam Hailmann	Hotelier		The tomb is located on the Eastern wall of the Kapellenfriedhof and was designed by sculptor Michael Arnold as a neo-Gothic chapel in the year 1858. Arnold himself describes it in his album of his works as »a chapel with altar – 12' tall«. As the tomb consists of sandstone, it is weathered accordingly; a broken piece of stone bears the signature „M. Arnold“. The crypt chapel was also used by the Fleischmann family, who were related to the Hailmann family.
August Hailmann			In sculptor Arnold's album of his works, there is also a photograph of the tomb Hailmann/Hemmerich, which is located at the Southern gate of the Kapellenfriedhof. According to its signature, it was created by sculptor Ferdinand Hümmler from the nearby municipality of Nüdlingen. The tomb was possibly created in 1877, Arnold's year of death. It is possible that Arnold's draft for the tomb was finally performed by Ferdinand Hümmler due to a work overload or Arnold's death in 1877. The 5-foot-tall St. Mary statue, which belonged to the tomb, is lost. After the veto of local heritage curator Werner Eberth, the plan of the city of Bad Kissingen to demolish the heavily deteriorated tomb was not carried out; the tomb was treated with conservation, instead. Eberth's proposal to reconstruct the lost St. Mary statue, however, was not carried out, as its look was not known (the photograph in Arnold's album was not known yet at the time when Eberth made his proposal).
Philipp Hailmann (1832–1903)	Book and art dealer	rahmenlos	The tomb was created in 1903 and bears Valentin Weidner's signature. It is located at the Southern wall of the churchyard. The middle niche is made of black and white marble and depicts an almost life size figure of a grieving woman in antique style.
Karl Halder (1877–1912)	Music teacher, sound artist, and spa house owner		
Family tomb Halk; Hans Weidner (1875–1953); Käthe Weidner; Oskar Weidner			The tomb bears the model of a grieving woman and is located in the South of the Marienkapelle. Sculptor Valentin Weidner created it for his son's Hans Weidner in-laws. On addition to Hans Weidner, those who are buried here also include his wife Käthe and his son Oskar.
Family tomb Häring			The family crypt of the Häring family was originally intended for the merchant Wilhelm Hironimus, who n the year 1856 ordered from the sculptor Michael Arnold a »monument of the merchant Hironimus from Barmen with his bust in the churchyard of Kissingen, bust in life size« as well as the crypt No. 25. The merchant's funeral, however, is not proven in Kissingen, which suggests that he changed his mind and sold his crypt to the Häring family. The Häring family placed the bust created for Hironimus to the left of the crypt onto the wall of the churchyard between the tombs Häring und Balling. Wilhelm Hironimus's bust is proven for February 1984 by a report in the local newspaper Saale-Zeitung from 9th February 1984 and was stolen shortly afterward. Shortly before, in the same year, the request of city and district heritage officer Werner Eberth to recover the bust was rejected.
Eduard Hemmerich (1797–1853)			
Family tomb Hendel		rahmenlos	The tomb was created in 1903 and bears sculptor Valentin Weidner's signature „V.W.“. It is located at the Southern wall of the churchyard. Twp reliefs made of white marble stand out on the tomb, which actually is designed simply. The right relief portrays the Risen Christ The left relief portrays a farmer plowing against the sun and the saying „I must work the works of him that sent me, while it is day: the night cometh, when no man can work!“
Johanna Hesse (1880–1958)	German opera and concert singer		
Adam Joseph Maria Valentin Donat Heußlein von Eußenheim (1755–1830)	Canon at St. Kilian's Cathedral in Würzburg	rahmenlos	
Balthasar Heußlein von Eußenheim (1525–1603)	First of his line in Kissingen		Epitaph in the choir in the Marienkapelle
Family tomb Heußlein von Eußenheim: Carl Leo Heußlein von Eußenheim (1838–1870); Christian Freiherr Lochner von Hüttenbach (1833–1916)	Long-established noble family, builder and owner of the Heußleinsches Schloss (today: New Town Hall)	rahmenlos	In the year 1870, Freiherr Christoph Heußlein von Eußenheim ordered from sculptor Michael Arnold the family tomb, which is located at the Northern wall of the churchyard. The same year, he died at 62 as well as his son Carl Leo Heußlein von Eußenheim, who died in the Franco-Prussian War. With the son, the noble line became extinct; Bavarian king Ludwig II, however, allowed brother-in-law Christian Lochner from Hüttenbach, to bear the name Lochner von Hüttenbach, „named Heußlein von Eußenheim“. The family crypt weas equipped with a life size knight in armour. This tomb as well as the tomb, which was located next to it and created by sculptor Valentin Weidner for the Luxburg family, was destroyed by a rotten poplar, which fell on the Northern wall of the churchyard. For a long time, the Lochner family did not know that the tomb had been created by Michael Arnold, but his authorship is proven by two photographs in his album of his works.
Baptist Hoffmann (1863–1937)	German opera singer	rahmenlos	
Huß			The tomb was created in 1902 and is located near the choir of the Marienkapelle. The tomb has the shape of a big lectern, is walled up by imitation petrifications and bears Valentin Weidner's signature „V. Weidner“ on the right side.
Family tomb Ihl: Ernst Ihl (1842–1899); Johann Baptist Ihl (1807–1865)	Pharmacists		The tomb was created in 1865 and bears sculptor Valentin Weidner's signature „V. W.“. The tomb is located at the choir of the Marienkapelle; with its black marble base and the crowning white marble cross, it has has the same structure as the family tomb Ringler.
Institute of the English Maiden			
Georg Joseph Jaeger (1768–1824)	Priest		Epitaph on the outer wall of the Marienkapelle
Family tomb Kellermann			The tomb was created in 1914 and bears sculptor Valentin Weidner's sculpture „V. Weidner modelirt 1914“. It is equipped with a bronze relief of The Risen Christ.
Family tomb Kess			The simple tomb was created in the year 1908. The relief depicting Saint George the Dragon Slayer stands out on the tomb. Under the relief, the saying can be read: „The righteous will rejoice in the Lord – God has chosen them as his heirs.“.
Cyrill Kistler (1848–1907)	German composer, music theorist, music educator and publisher	rahmenlos	The tomb was created in 1907 by sculptor Valentin Weidner and bears his signature „VW“. It is made of a stele on a tuff base and a profile relief portraying Cyrill Kistler.
Anton Tiberius Kliegl (1872–1927)	Tinsmith, manufacturer		
Family tomb Knies-Baudrexel			The tomb is made of yellow sand stone and bears sculptor Valentin Weidner's signature „V.W.“. The left inscription plaque was removed. The right inscription plaque bears the name Julian Knies, one of the first dead soldiers of World War I (20th August 1914).
Ernst Kraft (1861–1945)	Pharmacist, Purveyor to the Ducal Court of Saxony, International experience in Switzerland, France and Russia		
Family tomb Kralert			The simple tomb is kept in the style of the family tomb Münch, differs from the family tomb Münch, however, as it is made of black marble.
Carl Krampf (1863–1910)	German architect, Franz Krampf's brother		
Franz Krampf (1875–1945)	German architect, Carl Krampf's brother		
Johann Sebastian Krampf (1751–1817)	Rector of the Latin school in Kissingen		Epitaph on the outer wall of the Marienkapelle
Family tomb Krosse; Ernst Richard Krosse		rahmenlos	The tomb was created in 1905 and bears sculptor Valentin Weidner's signature „V. Weidner fec. 16.VII. 1905“. The powerful tomb is not kept in a historicist style. It shows a bronze relief of Ernst Richard Krosse.
Family tomb Lautner-Rosenberger			The tomb was created in 1908, completely is made of Muschelkalk and bears sculptor Valentin Weidner's signature „V.W.“. With its bust of Christ, it stands out among the tombs of the Kapellenfriedhof. According to city and district heritage curator Werner Eberth, this tomb can be regarded as Valentin Weidner's most modern one.
José de Legorburu y Domínguez-Matamoros (1882–1935)			
Family tomb Leuchs and Messerschmitt		rahmenlos	The tomb was created in 1893, is made of yellow sand stone and is designed with elements of romanticism. Its middle niche shows the portrait medaillon made of white marble of the art mill owner Josef Linus Leuchs. It bears sculptor Valentin Weidners signature „VW“.
Otto Levin (1849–1906)	Bookseller, bookprinter, bookbinder, photographer		
Gerhard Linhard (1805–1880)	Forensic and wound surgeon, mayor	rahmenlos	The tomb is made of green sand stone and is located at the Northern churchyard wall. Rising from a base plinth are two inscribed panels, with a recessed central panel between them—which contains an inset marble plaque—topped by an ornamental capital that supports a figure of the Virgin Mary. The structure is crowned by a large, full-width ornamental finial. In front of it lies the masonry burial vault, covered with slabs speckled in shades of gray and black.
Andreas Lohrey (1843–1924)	German architect		
Family tomb Luxburg; Caroline Countess of Luxburg, married name Cetto (1820–1881); Friedrich von Luxburg (1829–1905)	First Lady-in-Waiting to Crown Princess Marie of Prussia (Caroline, Countess of Luxburg); Royal Bavarian Chamberlain and President of the Government of Lower Franconia (Friedrich von Luxburg)	rahmenlos	The tomb was made in 1905 and bears sculptor Valentin Weidner's signature „V.W.“. It is located at the Northern wall of the churchyard and is made of green sand stone. During World War II or shortly afterwards, the adjacent family tomb of the noble family Heußlein von Eußenheim, which was made by sculptor Michael Arnold, was destroyed by a rotten poplar. Apparently, the family tomb Luxburg was simplified in the postwar period.
Johann Adam Maas (1784–1852)	Royal Bavarian District Physician (official medical officer) in Bad Kissingen and co-founder of the Theresien Hospital in Bad Kissingen		
Fritz Memmel (1884–1949)	Konditor		
Matthäus Memmel (1857–1934)			
Johann Baptist Messerschmidt (1836–1918)	Konditor, restaurant and spa hotel owner		
MSC (Missionaries of the Sacred Heart of Jesus)			
Müller			The tomb bears sculptor Valentin Weidners signature „V.W.“ on its side. Such as it is the case with the family tomb Fay, an older tomb was reused. The tombstone of the tomb Fay was reused in the year 1941.
Family tomb Münch			The tomb was created in 1906, is made of white limestone and bears sculptor Valentin Weidner's signature „VW“. The simple style of the tomb is to be explained by the financial circumstances of the clients.
Family tomb Nann und Voll			The tomb is located at the Northern wall of the churchyard and bears sculptor Valentin Weidner's signature. Seemingly, it was simplified in the postwar period. It is dominated by the electrotype of a victory angel.
Max Neubert (1863–1948)	German entrepreneur and inventor		
Family tomb Neugebauer und Schubert			Possibly, the tomb was created in 1875. It is located at the Southern wall of the churchyard and bears sculptor Valentin Weidner's signature „V.W.“. The powerfully designed tomb is dominated by a portrayal of the Risen Christ. Stylistically, it most closely corresponds to the Neo-Renaissance. Parts at the top and on the sides may already be missing.
Family tomb Niess			The tomb was created in 1905 and bears sculptor Valentin Weidner's signature „V. Weidner fec.“. It belongs to the great tombs created by Weidner and can be compared with the family tomb Hailmann. The tomb shows a relief, which consists of white marble and portrays a woman in front of a door opened only a crack. The family grave was subsequently used by the Dickas family.
Family tomb Johann Pfister			The tomb was created in 1884 and features a base made of black granite and a white limestone cross with a palm frond. It bears sculptor Valenin Weidner's signature.
Jacques Pilartz (1836–1910)	German photographer and court photographer to several German rulers	rahmenlos	
Family tomb Ringler			The tomb was created by sculptor Valentin Weidner, who here combined by means of a black marble base and a white marble cross elements from the Münch and Kralert tombs, which he also designed. It is not clear, however, whether the praying angel kneeling on the tomb was also created by Weidner.
Emmanuel Edler von Rössler (1859–1921)	Person of independent means		
Friedrich Roth (1847–1927)	Parish Priest in Bad Kissingen, Episcopal Spiritual Councilor, Papal Chamberlain (Prelate)		
Christian Sandrock (1862–1924)	Painter and writer	rahmenlos	
Tobias August Schachenmayer (1825–1912)	Bookseller, editor, founder of the local newspaper Saale-Zeitung		
Family tomb Scheuring			The base consists of white marble and was created by sculptor Valentin Weidner. The base supports an electrotype, which, however, is not the work of Weidner.
Johann Christoph von Schletten (??–1593)	Schultheiß of Hammelburg		Epitaph in the choir of the Marienkapelle
Family tomb Schmidt; Adolf Schmidt (1873–1929); Karl Schmidt (1834–1909)	Car manufacturer, car dealer		
Family tomb Schmidt			The tomb was created in 1908 and bears sculptor Valentin Weidner's signature „VW“. It is designed in a very simple style and, beneath a copper roof, houses a crucifixion scene in the manner of Tilman Riemenschneider.
Familiy tomb Schmidt; Albert Schmidt (1876–1932); Balduin Schmidt (1842–1917)	Hotel owner		The tomb is located at the Southern wall of the churchyard, was created in 1917 and bears sculptor Valentin Weidner's signature „V.W.“. It consists of green sand stone and is made in a neoclassical style.
Family crypt Leo Schmitt und Hartmann			The family crypt was made in 1892 and is located at the Northern wall of the churchyard in the department B and bears sculptor Valentin Weidner's signature.
Schmück			The grave was created in 1911 and houses a black marble base and a white limestone cross with a dove with floral tendrils. It bears sculptor Valentin Weidner's signature „VW“.
Family tomb Schöller; Michael Stöger (1849–1909)	Guesthouse owner		The authorship of sculptor Michael Arnold is proven by his album of his works. Due to the extensive weathering of the tomb inscriptions, the time of origin of the tomb can only be surmised; it was possibly created, however, in 1873. Son-in-law Michael Stöger (1849–1909; Royal secondary school teacher and local historian) is also buried in the family tomb. The life size angel statue of the tomb collapsed in the year 1994 and was re-erected at the instigation of local city and district heritage curator Werner Eberth Eberth.
Lina Schonder, née Grell (1904–1973)	Housekeeper, regional poet		
Andreas Arthur Singer (1833–1910)	Royal Bavarian Chief Court Gardener		
Wolfgang Singer (1865–1942)	Garden Director		
Family tomb Sotier: Alfred Sotier (1833–1902); Paul Sotier (1876–1950)	Physicians	rahmenlos	
Josef Steinbach (1815–1890)	Locksmith, master gunsmith, innkeeper, hotelier	rahmenlos	The tomb was created in 1890 and bears sculptor Valentin Weidner's signature „V. W.“. It is located at the Eastern wall of the churchyard. The focal point of the tomb is the portrait bust of hotelier Josef Steinbach; the tomb bears sculptor Valentin Weidner's signature „V. Weidner, fec.“.
Family tomb Stocker und Herramhof			The tomb was created in 1868 and bears sculptor Valentin Weidner's signature „VW“. Like the Steinbach tomb, it features red sandstone as its material and is designed in an antiquizing style.
Hugo Stöhr (1830–1901)	German physician specialized in women’s health and balneology	rahmenlos	
Karl Streit (1833–1902)	Royal Bavarian government auditor, saltworks administrator, and art collector		
Josef Stürmer (1904–1961)	Parish Priest in Bad Kissingen, Dean, Ecclesiastical Councilor		
Family tomb Suckfüll			The tomb was created in 1895, is located on the Southern wall of the churchyard and bears sculptor Valentin Weidner's signature „VW“. On the comparatively simple tomb , the figure of the mourning woman on the left side of the tomb stands out. The way the drapery falls on the garment reveals the artist's technical mastery; despite the signature, the work could also have been created by Valentin Weidner's son Hans Weidner, who used his father's signature for a period of time. The mourning female figure was renovated in the 1990s.
Family crypt Vogel			Possibly, the family crypt was created in 1902; it is located at the Eastern wall of the churchyard. It bears sculptor Valentin Weidner's signature „VW“.
Kaspar Wahler (1830–1902)	Economist (estate with a distillery in Euerdorf)		
Kaspar Wahler (1866–1936)	Brewery owner		
Family tomb Weidner; Valentin Weidner (1848–1919); Anna Mathilde Reuß (1861–1923); Barbara Maria Weidner; Johann Fridolin Hofmann	German sculptor, Hans Weidner's father	rahmenlos	The tomb, which Valentin Weidner created for himself, is located in the East of the choire of the Marienkapelle.The two stelae depict (to the left of the central cross) the Entombment of Christ and (to the right of the cross) the Risen Christ. In addition to Weidner, those buried in the grave include his second wife, Anna Weidner; his third daughter from his second marriage, Barbara Maria (known as Betty); and Johann Fridolin Hofmann, the husband of Weidner’s fourth daughter, Maria Rosa.
Family tomb Weinberger			The tomb was probably created in 1900; it consists of Kalkstein and bear sculptor Valentin Weidner's signature „VW“.
Family tomb Welsch: Heinrich Carl Welsch (1808–1882); Hermann Welsch (1842–1892)	Royal Bavarian Spa Physicians	rahmenlos	The tomb was created in 1882 by sculptor Valentin Weidner. The marble bust portraying Dr Carl Welsch originally towered above the Southern wall of the churchyard; its position was subsequently lowered. It is said that passersby at night were frightened by the shimmering marble bust that overlooked the wall of the churchyard. The material of the base does not match the rest of the grave. The bust bears on the shoulder attachment sculptor Valentin Weidner's signature „V. Weidner fec.“.
Barbara Elisabetha Wieber (1801–1822)			Epitaph on the outer wall of the Marienkapelle
Johannes Wiesinger (1821–1886)	Theologian, local and spa preacher, active in Kissingen from 1870 to 1882	rahmenlos	
Hermann Zoll (1842–1893)	Confectioner, pastry chef		
Kaspar Zoll (1808–1861)	Master blacksmith, flour merchant, gardener, town church worker		

== Structures and buildings belonging to the Kapellenfriedhof ==
=== The Marienkapelle (St. Mary Chapel) ===
It is possible that the Marienkapelle was built in the year 1286 but it is uncertain, however, whether the related documentary mention refers to the Marienkapelle or the St. James Church in the downtown of Bad Kissingen. Thr first certain mention of the Marienkapelle is from the year 1348. In 1727, Balthasar Neumann reconstructed the Marienkapelle; a lightning strike which happened on 7th May 1790, made it necessary to perform extensive repairs. The most recent renovation was done in the year 1975.

=== The Liebfrauensee (Lake of Our Lady) ===
The Liebfrauensee (Lake of Our Lady) is 1.076 m² in size and is located in front of the complex consisting of Marienkapelle and Kapellenfriedhof. Legend has it that its name is derived from a Marian apparition, which is said to have deterred a young man from his plans who wanted to throw himself into the lake because of heartbreak.

== Literature ==
- Denis A. Chevalley, Stefan Gerlach: Denkmäler in Bayern - Stadt Bad Kissingen, 1998, pp. 44-46
- Werner Eberth: Michael Arnold – Ein Bildhauer des Spätklassizismus. Theresienbrunnen-Verlag, Bad Kissingen 2001, pp. 118–150.
- Werner Eberth: Der Deutsche Krieg von 1866 im Landkreis Bad Kissingen. Theresienbrunnen-Verlag, Bad Kissingen 2016, This article incorporates text from a publication now in the public domain: Dictionary of National Biography. London: Smith, Elder & Co. 1885–1900., S. 70 ff.
- Edi Hahn: Bad Kissingen. Eine Stadtführung. Bad Kissingen 1991, ISBN 3-925722-04-1, pp. 45–47, 63–69.
- Victoria May: Der Kapellenfriedhof Bad Kissingen. (= Infobroschüre aus der Reihe Stadtgeschichtliche Informationen). Stadt Bad Kissingen, Bad Kissingen 2025 (PDF).
- Franz Warmuth: 100 Jahre Herz Jesu Pfarrei Bad Kissingen – Beitrag zur Geschichte der Pfarrei Bad Kissingen. Katholisches Stadtpfarramt Bad Kissingen, Bad Kissingen 1984, This article incorporates text from a publication now in the public domain: Dictionary of National Biography. London: Smith, Elder & Co. 1885–1900., pp. 23–38.
- Gerhard Wulz: Die Friedhöfe in Bad Kissingen. In: Thomas Ahnert, Peter Weidisch (Hrsg.): 1200 Jahre Bad Kissingen, 801–2001, Facetten einer Stadtgeschichte. (= Festschrift zum Jubiläumsjahr und Begleitband zur gleichnamigen Ausstellung / Sonderpublikation des Stadtarchivs Bad Kissingen). Verlag T. A. Schachenmayer, Bad Kissingen 2001, ISBN 3-929278-16-2, p. 314.
- Gerhard Wulz: Der Kapellenfriedhof in Bad Kissingen. Ein Führer mit Kurzbiografien. Stadt Bad Kissingen, Bad Kissingen 2001, ISBN 3-934912-04-4; 2. erweiterte und überarbeitete Ausgabe: Stadt Bad Kissingen, Bad Kissingen 2019, ISBN 978-3-934912-24-3.
