= Battle of Kissingen =

Battle between Bavarian and Prussian troops in the Austrian-Prussian War

- Part of the Austro-Prussian War
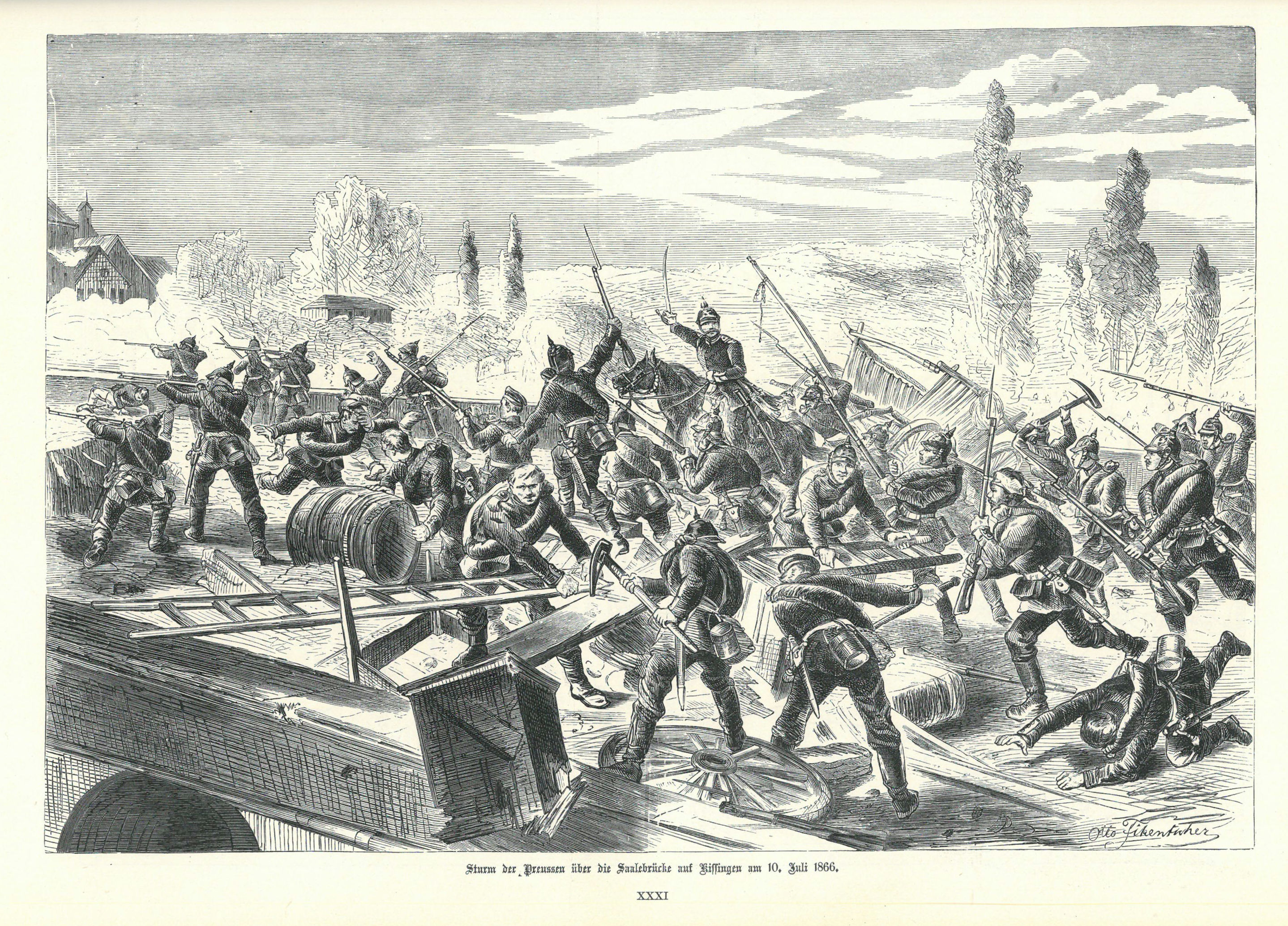
- Battle of Kissingen
Date	10 July 1866
Location	Bad Kissingen, Bavaria
Result	Prussian victory

Belligerents
Prussia	Bavaria

Commanders and leaders
Eduard von Falckenstein; August von Goeben; Edwin von Manteuffel; Gustav von Beyer	Karl von Bayern; Oskar von Zoller †

Strength
16 battalions 9 squadrons 18,000; 31 cannons	14 battalions 28 squadrons 15,000; 36 cannons

Casualties and losses
1,589 killed 2,345 wounded 780 missing or captured	899 killed 1,256 wounded 587 missing and captured

The Battle of Kissingen was a battle between Bavarian and Prussian troops on 10 July 1866 during the Austrian-Prussian War in and around the town of Kissingen (today: Bad Kissingen) in Bavaria. It was part of the campaign of the Main and ended with a victory of the Prussians.

== Preliminary campaign ==
While the majority of the Prussian armies marched to Bohemia, where they defeated the Austrian and Saxon troops on 3 July at Königgrätz (Sadova), the Prussian western army first moved into the Kingdom of Hanover. After the surrender of Hanover on June 29 these troops were grouped under the name Mainarmee (German for: Army of the river Main) and pushed southward towards the river Main against the allies of Austria in southern Germany. The Bavarian troops, who formed the VIIth Federal Corps of the German Confederation, withdrew after several lost battles to Kissingen. There they wanted to prevent the Prussians from crossing the river Franconian Saale.

== The battle ==
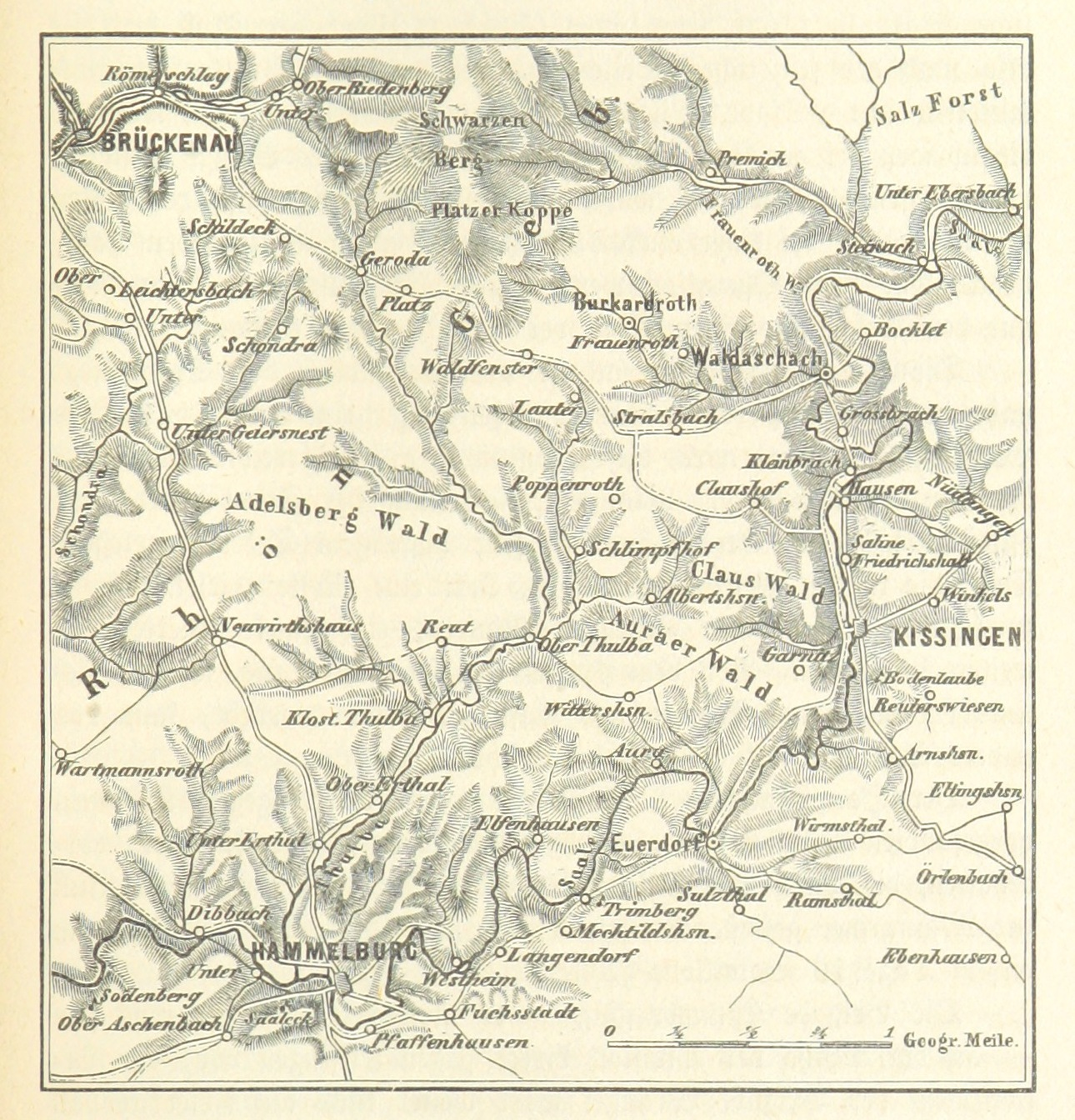
The area of the battle of Kissingen

The Prussian troops crossed the Rhön Mountains and occupied Brückenau, while the Bavarians took positions along the Saale between Steinach in the northeast and Hammelburg in the southwest. The Prussian Commander Eduard von Falckenstein directed the division of August von Goeben directly to Kissingen. The division of Gustav von Beyer was sent to Hammelburg and the division of Edwin von Manteuffel to Waldaschach (today: Aschach), Hausen and the Friedrichshall saltworks (today: Obere Saline) to capture the neighbouring bridges and catch the Bavarians in the flank. In a fight at Waldaschach the Prussians captured the village and the bridge in the afternoon. At Hausen and Friedrichshall north of Kissingen, where the Bavarians had built a strong line of defense to cover their right flank, heavy fighting developed.

The division of Goeben arrived from northwest on the right side of the Franconian Saale in opposite of the town. The Bavarians had entrenched themselves on the left bank of the Saale and barricaded the bridge Ludwigsbrücke. At about 9 o'clock the Prussians started attacking the bridge. The attack was repulsed at first. But a pedestrian walkway at the mill Lindesmühle about 500 meters south of the town had not been completely destroyed by the Bavarians. The Prussians were able to make this bridge accessible again and bring troops to the other side of the Saale. These attacked the Bavarians on their left flank while on the Ludwigsbrücke a second attack took place. Previously, the Bavarian cannons that covered the approaches to the bridge had to be withdrawn under the fire of the Prussian artillery, so that the Prussian infantry finally succeeded in crossing the Ludwigsbrücke and entered the town. Heavy street fighting followed. At about one o'clock in the afternoon the town was conquered and the Bavarians had to retreat to the east. After fierce fighting in the cemetery Kapellenfriedhof (Chapel Cemetery) east of the town, the Bavarians had to retreat to the village of Winkels, where they built up a new line of defense on the surrounding heights Sinnberg and Winterleite. The Prussians advanced and in the further fighting the Bavarian commander, Lieutenant General Oskar von Zoller, was hit by a shell and mortally wounded. Until about three o'clock in the afternoon all the Bavarian positions on the heights were taken by the Prussians. Now the Prussians advanced to the neighbouring village Nüdlingen. At 4 p.m. Bavarian reinforcements from Münnerstadt reached Nüdlingen - unnoticed by the Prussians. A surprising Bavarian counterattack was partially successful at first. But in the evening the Prussians started a vigorous counterattack for their part. The Bavarians, who suffered from lack of ammunition, were thrown back onto Nüdlingen.

After Kissingen was lost the Bavarian troops at Friedrichshall and Hausen, which meanwhile also had been taken by the Prussians, got the order to withdraw to Nüdlingen. Under the cover of darkness, the Bavarians marched back to Münnerstadt.

At Hammelburg the Bavarians were defeated too. Prussian artillery fire, which caused heavy devastation in the town, forced the Bavarian troops to leave the town and retreat to Arnstein.

== Consequences ==
As a result of the battle of Kissingen the Bavarian troops withdrew towards Schweinfurt and Würzburg. A unification with the VIIIth Federal Corps (troops from, Baden, Wuerttemberg and Hesse) was prevented. The Prussians now turned west, where they attacked the VIIIth Corps and occupied Frankfurt.

== Aftermath ==
According to official figures the Prussians lost 10 officers and 133 men at Kissingen, Waldaschach and Nüdlingen by death, another 10 men at Hammelburg. 25 officers and 673 men were wounded in and around Kissingen, another 6 officers and 66 men at Hammelburg. One officer and 37 men were missed. The Bavarians lost at Kissingen 1 general, 8 officers and 92 men by death, another 10 men at Hammelburg. 37 officers and 554 men were wounded, another 4 officers and 64 men at Hammelburg. 6 officers and 559 men were missed at Kissingen. Most of them were captured in the town after they were cut off their units. 22 men were missed at Hammelburg. Considerably higher numbers of victims – at least for the Bavarians - are assumed according to recent research which count 246 dead Bavarians for Kissingen and 23 for Hammelburg.

== Memory ==
Most victims of the battle - no matter whether Bavarians or Prussians - were buried together in mass graves at the cemetery Kapellenfriedhof and next to it. Some were buried at once in graves in the fields where they had been found. Three Jewish Prussians are buried at the Jewish cemetery of Kissingen, among them an officer. All this graves still exist until today. A memorial for the victims of both sides was erected at a mass grave beside the Kapellenfriedhof showing the „Mourning Germania“ of the sculptor Michael Arnold. A mass grave near Hausen and Friedrichshall is the place of another memorial. At the place where Oskar von Zoller had been mortally wounded a monument commemorates the Bavarian commander. Another memorial at the street from Winkels to Nüdlingen was erected for the more than 60 fallen of the Prussian infantry regiment No. 19 of Posen (Poznan) in the Polish part of Prussia. Before the fight the Prussian General Ferdinand von Kummer had held a speech in Polish to the soldiers, because most of them were Polish inhabitants of the Province of Posen. Representatives of the Polish state took part in a memorial celebration in Kissingen at the 150th anniversary of the battle.

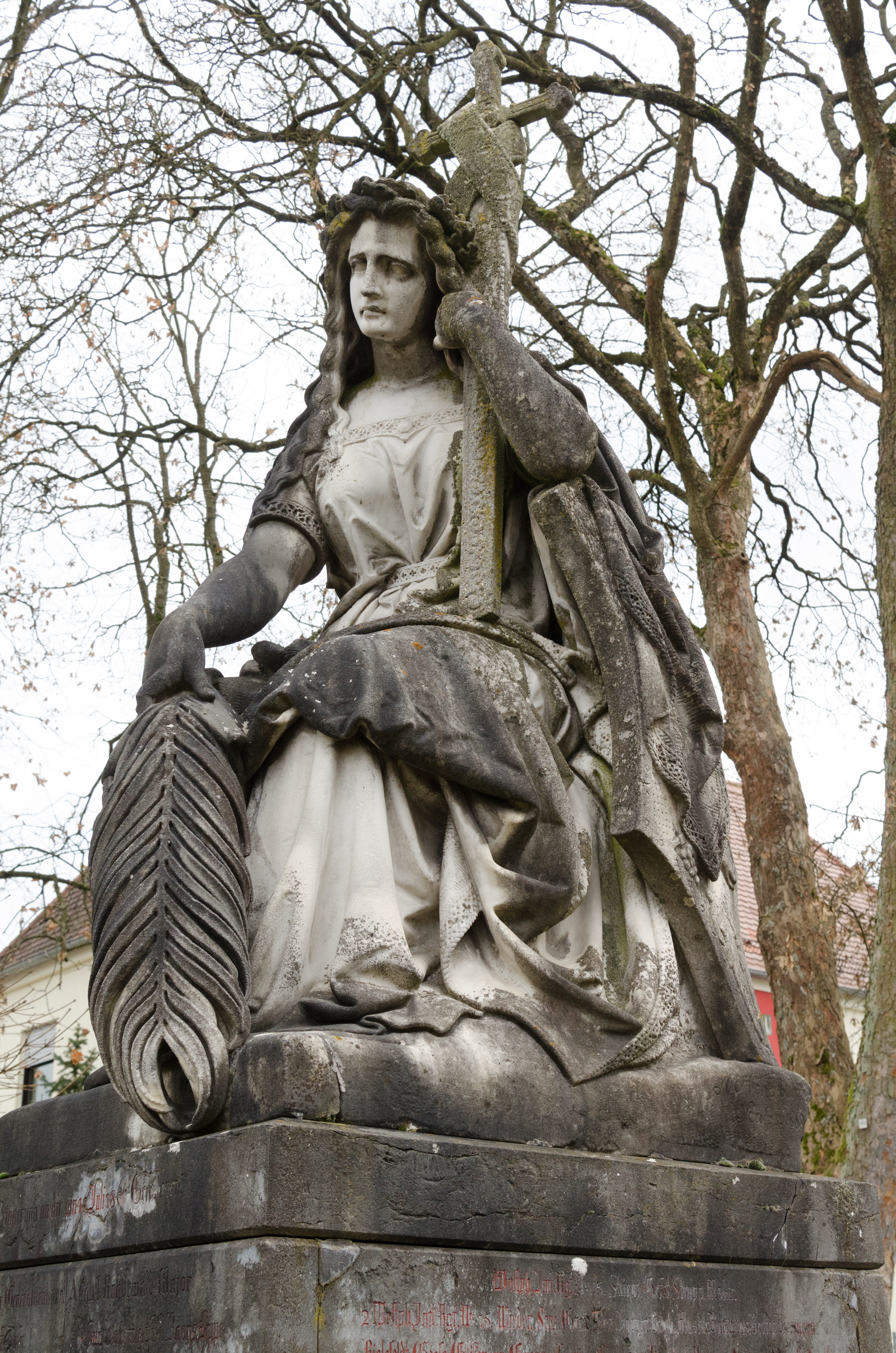
Mourning Germania nearby the Kapellenfriedhof

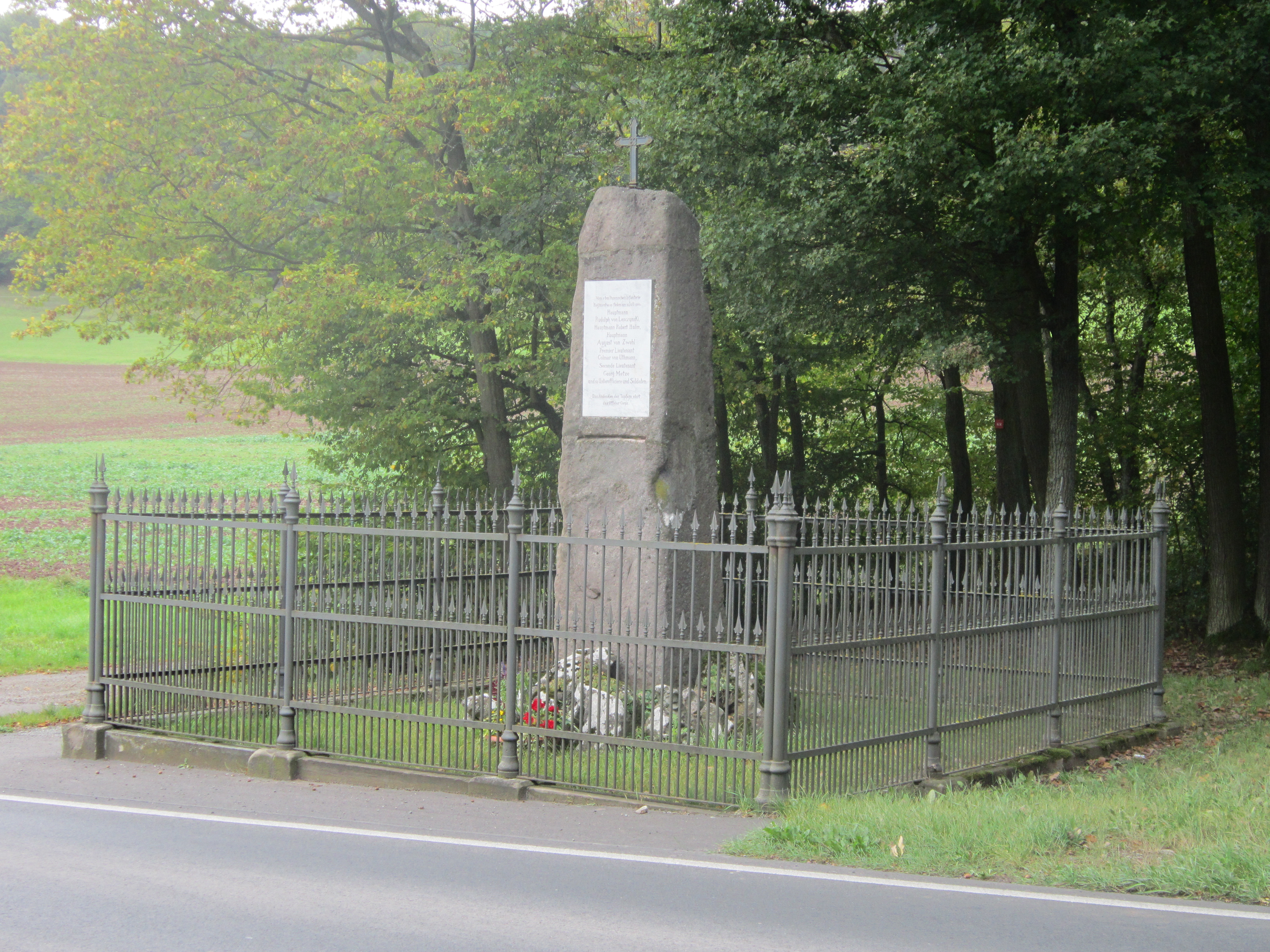
Memorial for the soldiers of the infantry regiment of Poznan at Winkels

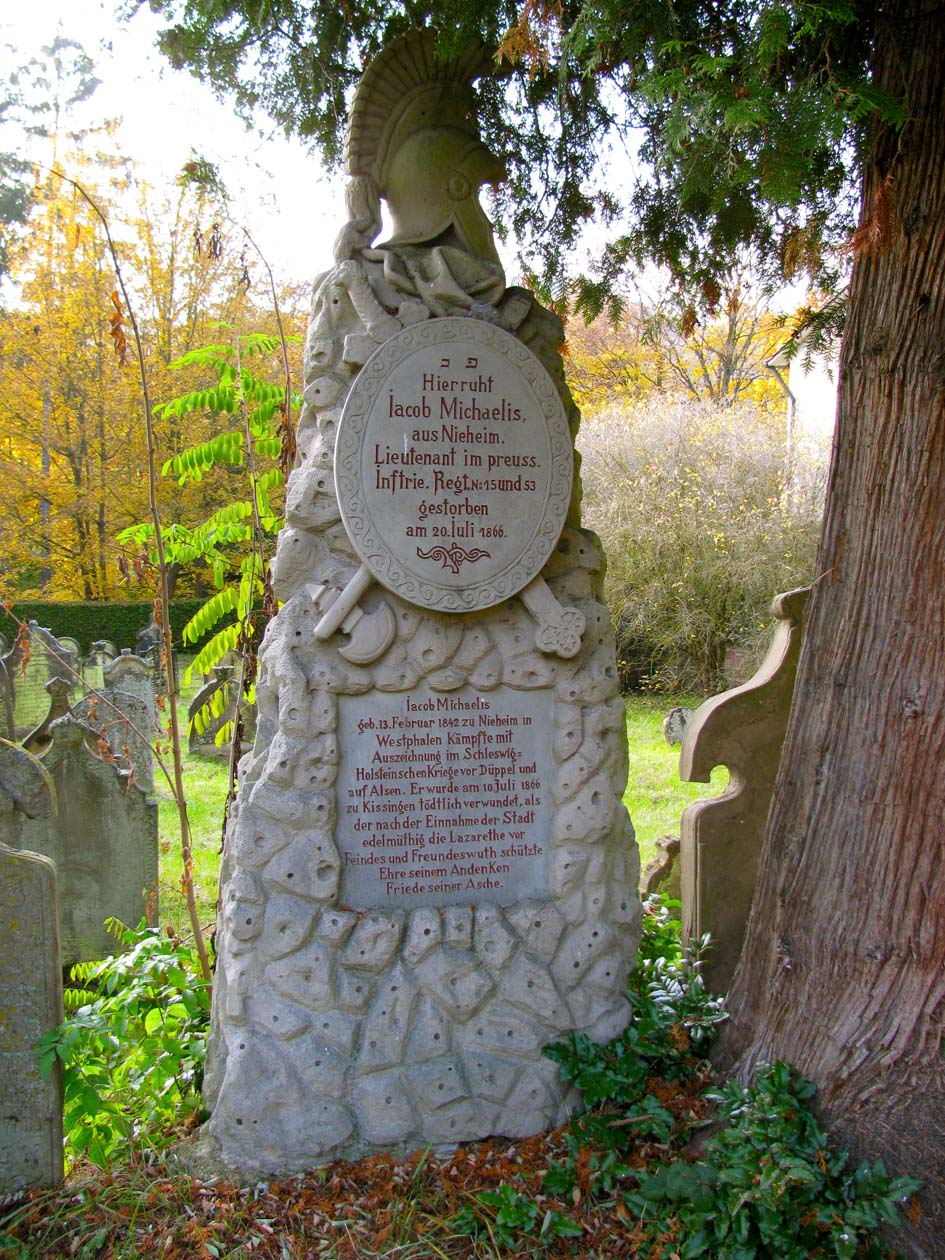
Grave of a Prussian officer at the Jewish cemetery

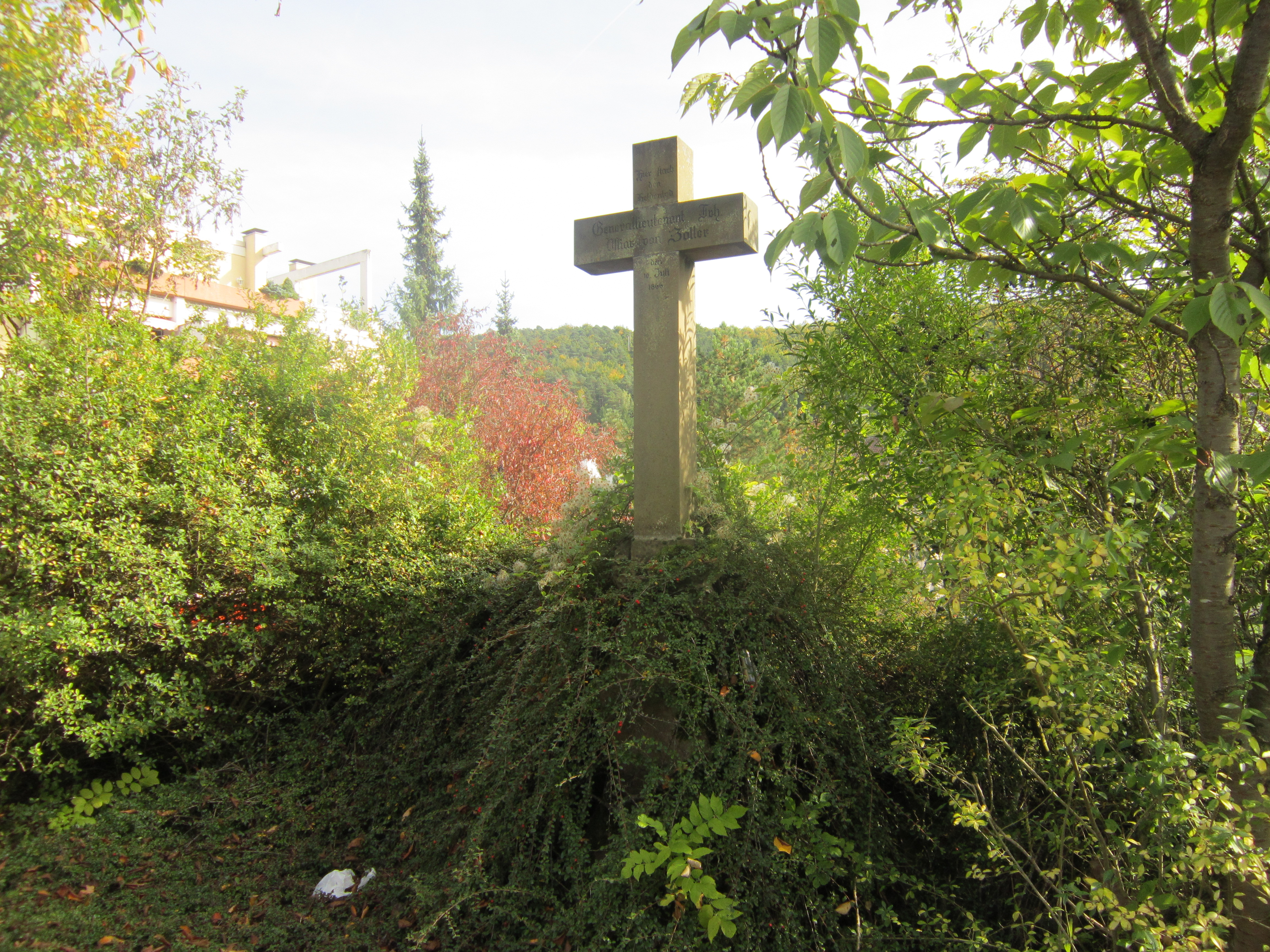
Memorial for the Bavarian commander Oskar von Zoller

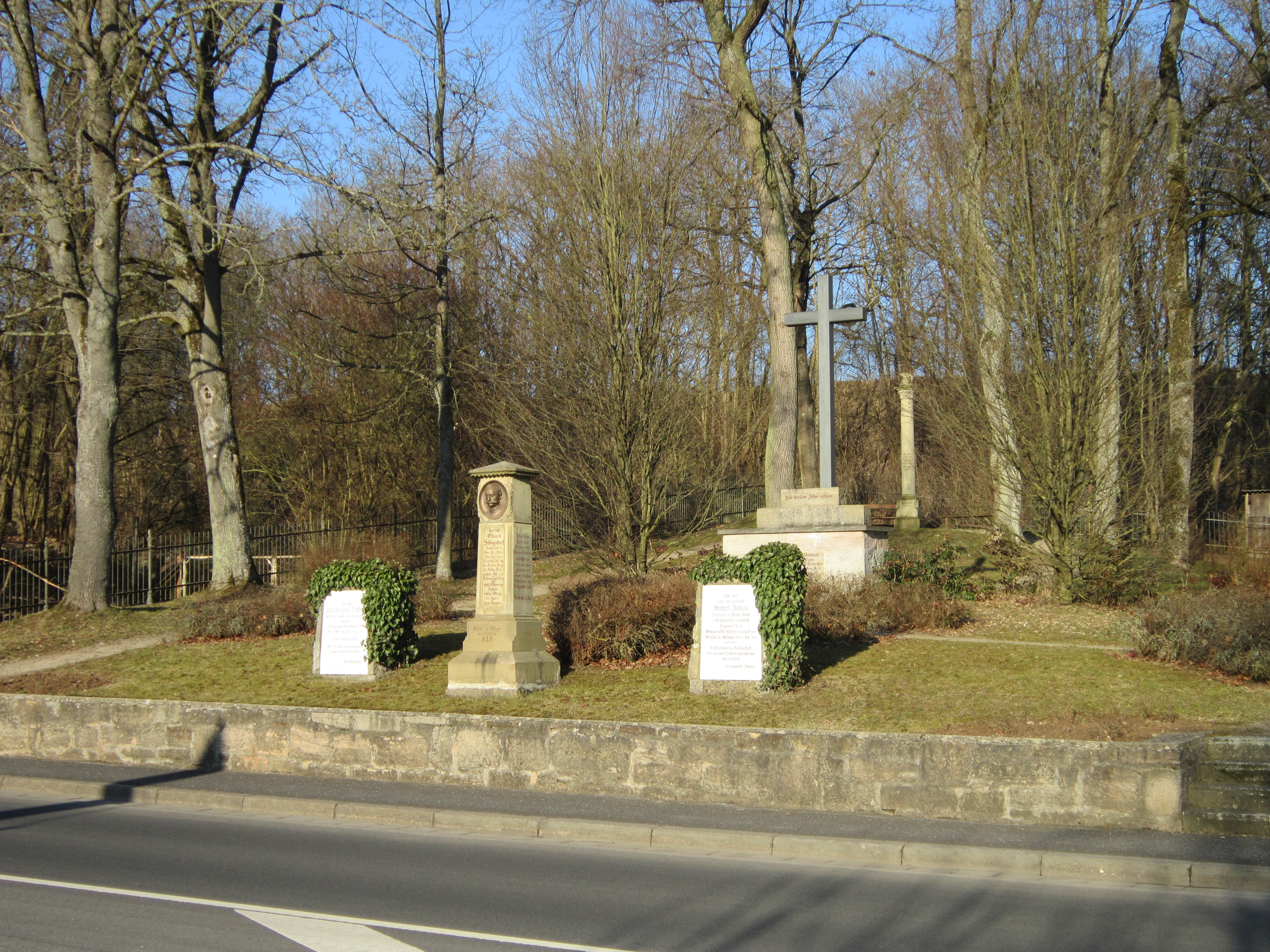
Mass grave and memorial near Hausen and Friedrichshall

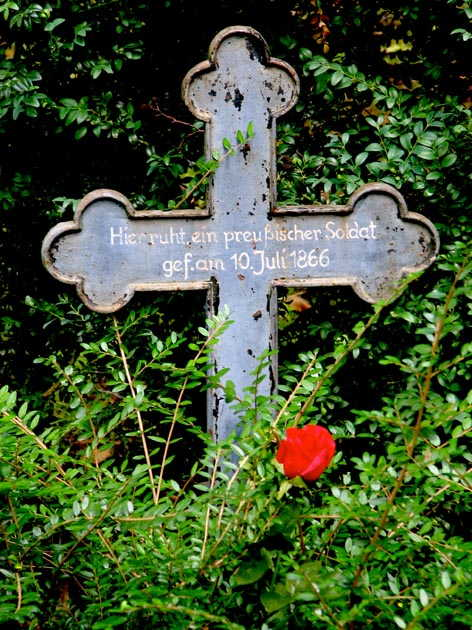
Grave of a Prussian soldier, one of the graves around Kissingen
