= Cyrill Kistler =

German composer (1848–1907)

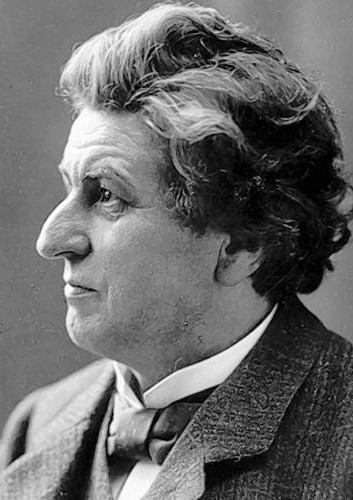
Cyrill Kistler

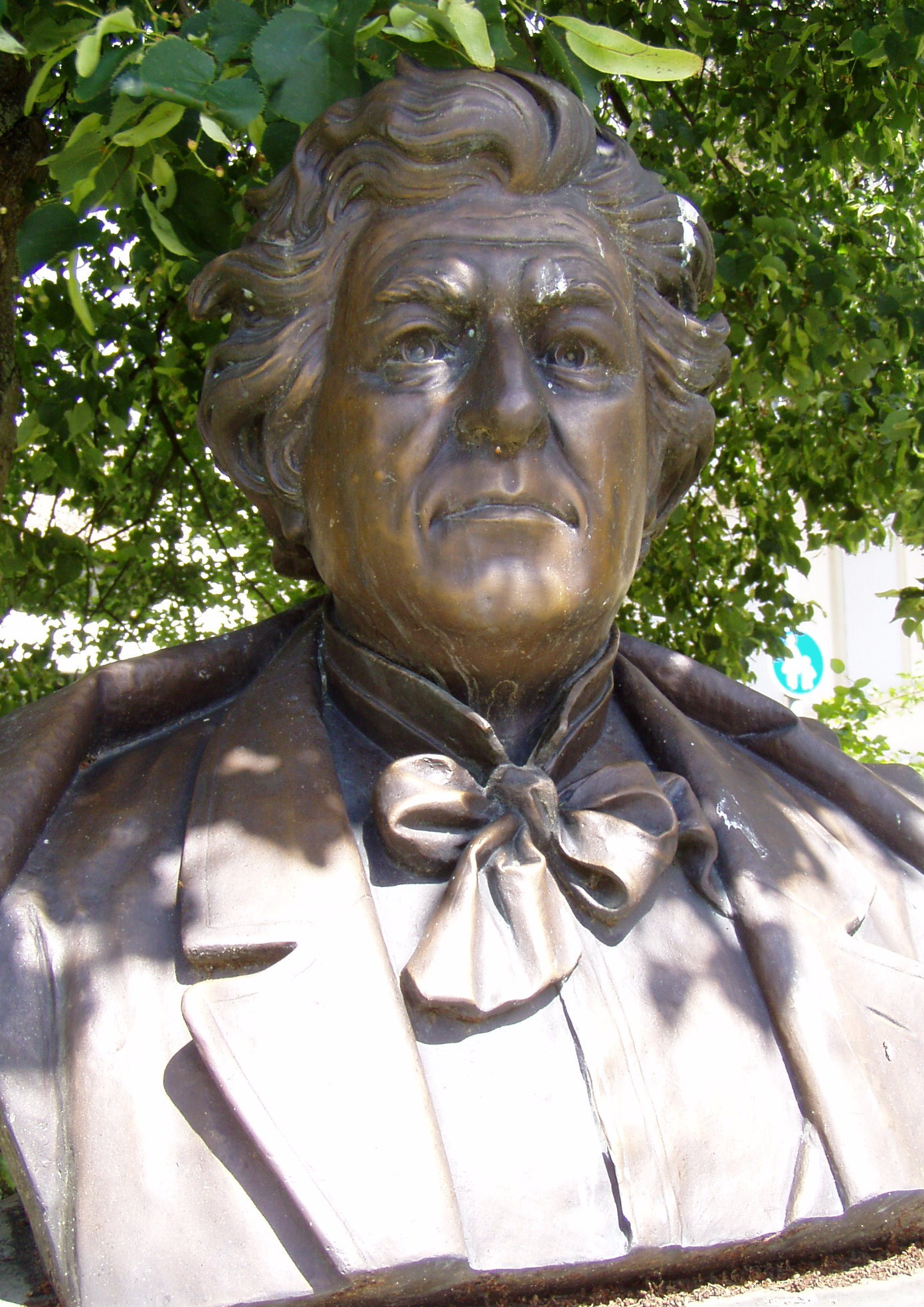
Kistler's bust at Bad Kissingen

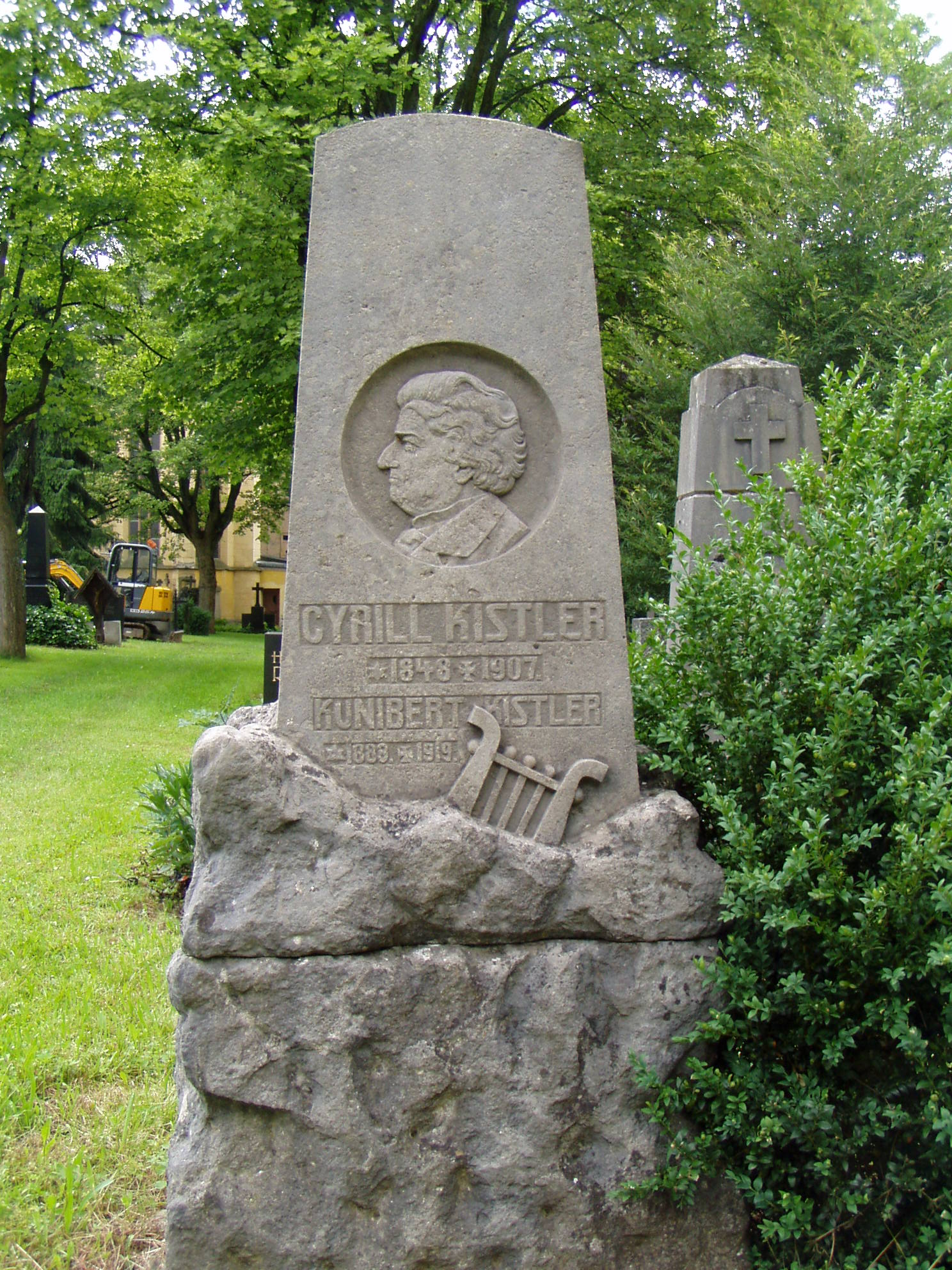
Kistler's grave at the Kapellenfriedhof, Bad Kissingen

Cyrill Kistler (12 May 1848 in Großaitingen, Swabia, Germany – 1 January 1907 in Bad Kissingen, Lower Franconia, Germany) was a German composer, music theoretician, Music educator and Music publisher.

== Life ==
Born into a Swabian family of craftsmen, Kistler attended the Lehrerseminar (Teacher seminar) in Lauingen (Swabia) from 1864 to 1867. Subsequently, he first worked as a teacher at various places in Middle Swabia. However, when he was no longer content with this way of making a living, he, instead, concentrated merely on making and composing music. From 1876 to 1878, he was a student at the Königliche Musikschule (Royal Music School) in Munich in the subjects organ and composition; one of his teachers was Josef Rheinberger. Afterwards, in 1883, he took over the position of a teacher for Music theory at the Fürstliches Konservatorium (Baronial Academy of Music) at Sondershausen. In 1876, he got to know Richard Wagner at Bayreuth, whose work exerted a deep influence on Kistler.

From 1884 on, he worked at Bad Kissingen in Lower Franconia, where he founded his own music school. From 1880 on, he published the music journal „Musikalische Tagesfragen. Organ für Musiker, Musikfreunde und Freunde der Wahrheit“ („Current questions on music. An organ for musicians, friends of music and friends of truth“). The journal existed for a period of 12 years, with periods of interruptions due to Kistler's health problems in between. Kistler composed operas (for instance „Baldurs Tod“, „Die Kleinstädter“, „Kunihild“, „Der Schmied von Kochel“ und „Eulenspiegel“), secular and clerical choral works, songs, and pieces for organ and piano. In 1904, Kistler published his harmonics „Der einfache Kontrapunkt und die einfache Fuge“ („The Simple Counterpoint and the Simple Fugue“).

In his lifetime, Kistler became very well known through his work and by writing more than 200 works. He was placed on a par with Richard Strauss and, in a certain way, was in competition with him. When Kistler premiered his opera „Eulenspiegel“ at Würzburg in 1889, Richard Strauss, though, regarded the libretto of the opera to be „clumsy“ and „amusing“. Instead, he used the opera as an opportunity to write his own Symphonic poem „Till Eulenspiegel's Merry Pranks“ a few years later, which had far more success.

Richard Wagner described his friend Cyrill Kistler as his only dignified successor. Kistler's former teacher Josef Rheinberger dedicated his work „De profundis“, which he had written on April 22, 1881, to his former student Kistler with the handwritten dedication on it: „Herrn Cyrill Kistler zu freundl. Erinnerung. München 16.5.1896. J. Rh.“ („To Mr. Cyrill Kistler on a friendly memory. Munich, May 16th 1896, J. Rh.“).

However, Kistler's music is nowadays sunk into oblivion to a great extent. His grave on the Bad Kissingen Kapellenfriedhof (Chapel Cemetery) is unnoticed.

Among his students was the pianist Mieczysław Horszowski, who was once described as Polish „child prodigy“.

== Works (Excerpt) ==
- Musiktheoretische Schriften, 2. Auflage, Verlag C.F. Schmidt, Heilbronn 1898–1904.
  - Band 1: Harmonielehre.
  - Band 2: Der einfache Kontrapunkt. Der Dreisatz und Zweisatz. Die einfache Fuge. (System Rheinberger-Kistler.)
  - Band 3: Der doppelte Kontrapunkt, die Doppelfuge, die dreistimmige und zweistimmige Fuge.
  - Band 4: Der drei-, vier- und fünfstimmige Kontrapunkt. Höchste Kunst der Polyphonie. Die Fuge zu drei, vier und fünf Stimmen.
- Die Hexenküche (Symphonic poem based on Goethe's Faust) op. 130
- Festmarsch für großes Orchester op. 41

== Tributes ==
In Bad Kissingen as well as in Großaitingen, streets named after Cyrill Kistler are to be found. In Großaitingen, there is a memorial stone opposite the house of his birth.

== Literature ==
- Thomas-M. Langner (1977). "Kistler, Cyrill". Neue Deutsche Biographie (in German). Vol. 11. Berlin: Duncker & Humblot. pp. 689–690.
- Gerhard Wulz: Der Kapellenfriedhof in Bad Kissingen. Ein Führer mit Kurzbiografien, Bad Kissingen 2001, ISBN 3-934912-04-4
- Hanns-Helmut Schnebel: Cyrill Kistler - Tondichter und Pädagoge; in: „Bayerische Blasmusik“ 49,6 (1998), VII
- Peter Ziegler: Der Komponist der „Rhönklänge“ Cyrill Kistler. In: „Rhön-Spiegel“, Band 24 (2007), Heft 1
- Cyrill Kistler, Nachruf. In: „The Musical Times“, Band 48, Nr. 768 vom 1. Februar 1907), Seite 111
