= Baptist Hoffmann =

German operatic baritone

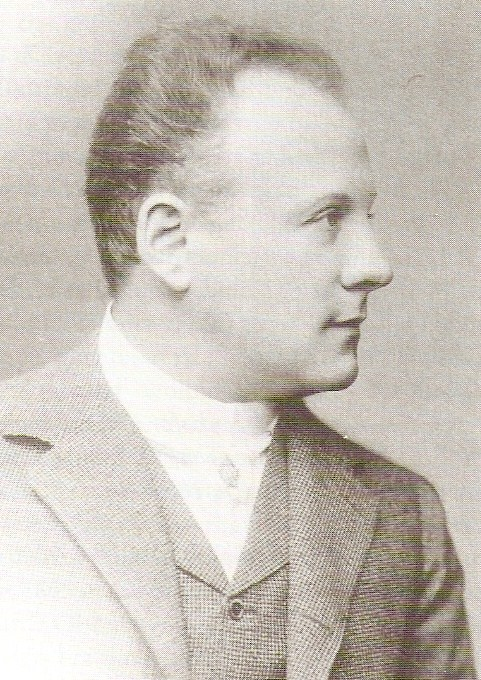
- Baptist Hoffmann
- Born: 9 July 1863; Garitz, Kingdom of Bavaria (now part of Bad Kissingen, Germany)
- Died: 5 July 1937 (aged 73); Bad Kissingen, Germany
- Occupations: Operatic baritone; Voice teacher
- Organizations: Berlin Court Opera; Stern Conservatory
- Title: Kammersänger

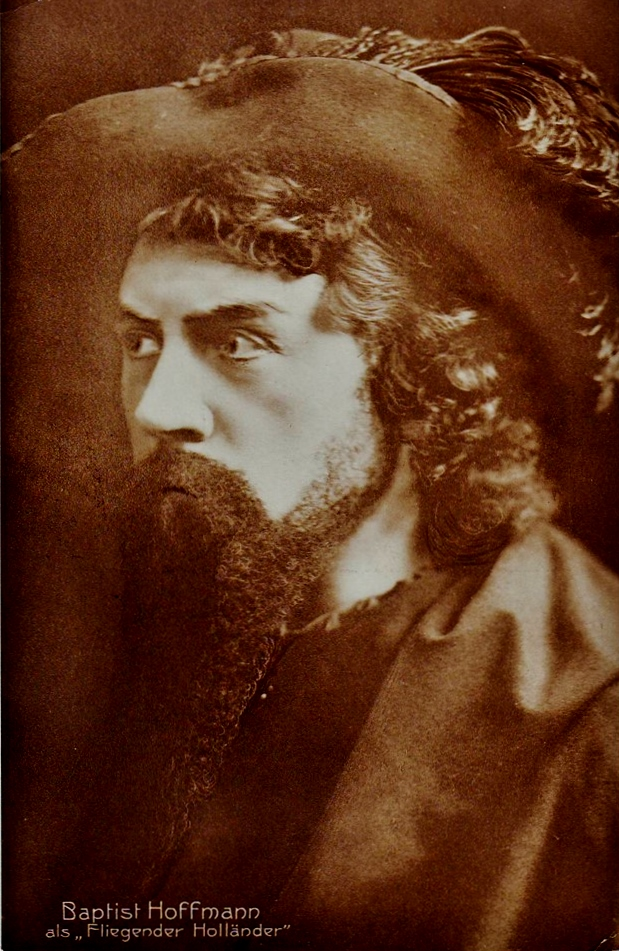
Hoffmann as the Dutchman, c. 1885

Johann Baptist Hoffmann (9 July 1863 – 5 July 1937) was a German operatic baritone and voice teacher. A long-term member of the Berlin Court Opera, he performed leading roles in Europe, such as Verdi's Rigoletto and Wagner's Dutchman in Der fliegende Holländer. He took part in several world premieres in Berlin.

== Life and career ==
Born in Garitz, now part of Bad Kissingen, Hoffmann was the fifth child of Wolfgang Melchior Hoffmann (died 1880), a proprietor of a material goods shop from Ochsenfurt and part-time trombonist in the Kurorchester Bad Kissingen, and Margarethe Hoffmann, née Guck, a talented alto singer in the church choir. He was noticed as a boy soprano. He first worked as a salesman but decided for a singing career. August Kindermann in Munich and other singing teachers judged him unsuitable for opera singing, but he was accepted by Weinlich-Tipka in Munich. He made his operatic debut as a hunter in Kreutzer's Das Nachtlager in Granada.

He got an engagement at the Graz Opera, followed by a four-year engagement at the Cologne Stadttheater from 1888, where Valentin in Gounod's Faust and the title role in Wagner's Der fliegende Holländer (The Flying Dutchman) were among his successes. In 1890, the director of the then Deutsche Oper in New York wanted to engage Hoffmann but without success. In 1892 and 1893, Hoffmann refined his vocal skills with Julius Stockhausen in Frankfurt.

He was a member of the Hamburg Opera from 1894 to 1897. From 1895, he made guest performances in Germany, Austria, and the Netherlands, including as Hans Sachs in Wagner's Die Meistersinger von Nürnberg at the Berlin Court Opera and soon afterwards as Lysiart in Weber's Euryanthe. The audience regarded him as a successor of Franz Betz, the first Wotan at the Bayreuth Festival. In 1897, Hoffmann almost moved to the Vienna Court Opera with Gustav Mahler, Kapellmeister at the Hamburg Opera, but instead moved to the Berlin Court Opera as first baritone, and he remained there until 1919. He took part in several world premieres there, including Chabrier's Briséïs (in German) in 1899, Lortzing's Regina the same year, d'Albert's Kain in 1900, Leoncavallo's Der Roland von Berlin in 1904, and Humperdinck's Die Heirat wider Willen in 1905. In 1906, he appeared as Jochanaan in the house's first production of Salome by Richard Strauss.

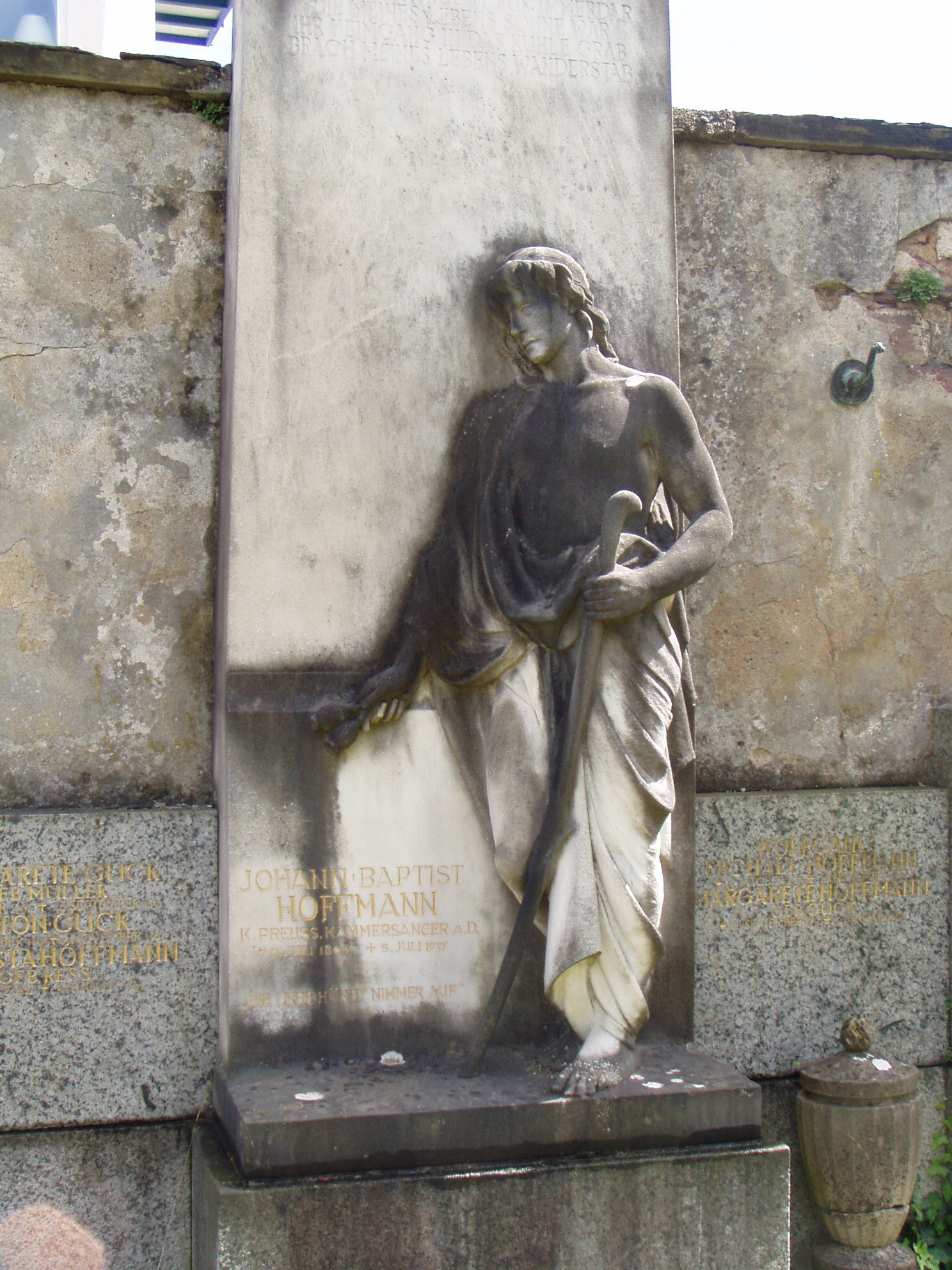
Hoffmann's grave

His mother's death in 1908 plunged him into a deep life crisis. He wanted to give up singing after the end of his engagement in Berlin scheduled for 1910 but found new energy through an extended stay at Schloss Hornegg on Neckar. In November 1910, he appeared as the Minstrel in the German premiere of Humperdinck's opera Königskinder after Humperdinck had insisted on casting the role with Hoffmann. He extended his engagement to 1915 and again to 1919. He created roles in several world premieres in Berlin.

After the end of his stage career in 1919, Hoffmann began to train young singers. In 1928, he was appointed teacher at the Stern Conservatory.

Hoffmann's last public appearance was part of a charity event in Bad Kissingen. On 5 July 1937, Hoffmann died of a heart attack there. His grave is at the Kapellenfriedhof.

The archive of the Berlin College of Music contains vocal recordings by Hoffmann. In 1995, a CD with Hoffmann's role as mayor in Leoncavallo's Der Roland von Berlin was published by Diji-Rom, New York.

== Repertoire ==
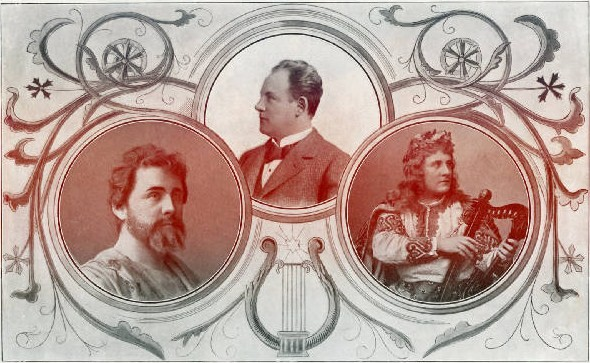
Publicity card, left as Odysseus, right as Wolfram

Hoffmann's total of 103 roles, which covered both lyrical and heroic opera, included:

- Amonasro (Aida)
- Bürgermeister (Der Roland von Berlin)
- Figaro, the barber (Der Barbier von Sevilla)
- Freudhofer (Der Evangelimann)
- Friedrich von Telramund (Lohengrin)
- Hans Heiling (Hans Heiling)
- Hans Sachs (Die Meistersinger von Nürnberg)
- Hans Stadinger (Der Waffenschmied)
- Holländer (Der fliegende Holländer)
- Jago (Otello)
- Lothario (Mignon)
- Lysiart (Euryanthe)
- Nelusco (L'Africaine)
- Orestes (Elektra)
- Papageno (Die Zauberflöte)
- Pizarro (Fidelio)
- Rigoletto (Rigoletto)
- Simeon (Joseph)
- Spielmann (Königskinder)
- Valentin (Faust)
- Wolfram von Eschenbach (Tannhäuser)

== Honours ==
In 1913, Hoffmann was awarded the rare title "Königlicher Preußischer Kammersänger" on the occasion of his 25th stage anniversary.
