= Oskar von Zoller =

Bavarian general (1809–1866)

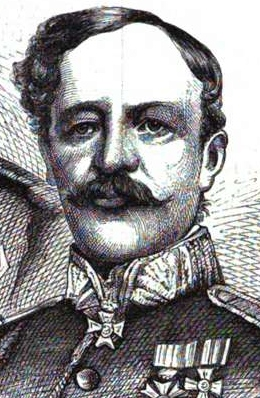
- Born: 13 November 1809; Straubing, Lower Bavaria, Bavaria
- Died: 10 July 1866 (aged 56); Bad Kissingen, Lower Franconia, Bavaria
- Military career
- Allegiance: Bavaria
- Branch: Bavarian Army
- Service years: 1827 – 1866
- Rank: Lieutenant general
- Commands: 3rd Infantry Division
- Conflicts: Austro-Prussian War: Battle of Kissingen †
- Awards: Order of the Red Eagle (2nd class); Order of the Redeemer (silver cross)

Oskar Freiherr von Zoller was a Bavarian Lieutenant general who was known for serving at the Battle of Kissingen during the Austro-Prussian War, being killed during the fighting.

== Biography ==
He was the son of Lieutenant general Friedrich Freiherr von Zoller (1762–1821), who had become a Freiherr in 1816. In 1827, Zoller joined the Bavarian Army as a Junker in the Lifeguards Infantry Regiment in Munich, became an officer in 1828 and was promoted to captain in 1842. In 1840–41, while still a first lieutenant, Zoller accompanied Crown Prince Maximilian Joseph (later King Maximilian II of Bavaria), as an orderly officer on a trip to Greece. On 3 January 1842 he received the silver cross of the Greek Order of the Redeemer. King Ludwig I then appointed him as one of his wing adjutants. He later became Hofmarschall of the crown prince, who also appointed him his wing adjutant after taking over the government.

In 1850 he returned to military service and became a lieutenant colonel in the 3rd Infantry Regiment "Prinz Karl von Bayern" in Augsburg, of which he became commander in 1853. Two years later, as major general, Zoller assumed command of the 7th Infantry Brigade in Bayreuth. As such, in 1860 he received the Prussian Order of the Red Eagle, II Class and in 1861 was promoted to Lieutenant General and Commander at Nuremberg.

At the outbreak of the Austro-Prussian War he became Commanding General of the 3rd Infantry Division. In this position he fell in the Battle of Kissingen in the village of Bad Kissingen, being mortally wounded by shrapnel after two horses had previously been shot under him. Four months later, on 28 November 1866, during a visit to Bad Kissingen, King Ludwig II was shown the place where Zoller had fallen and then drove to Nüdlingen, where Zoller's body had been laid in state in the vicarage. Previously, Ludwig's mother Marie of Prussia had been to Kissingen and also visited the vicarage in Nüdlingen. She then had ordered a memorial stone from sculptor Michael Arnold in memory of Zoller.

In the course of the Austro-Prussian War, Zoller is said to have asked the commander-in-chief of the southern German troops, Prince Karl Theodor of Bavaria, three times for the relief of the Hanoverians, whereupon he is said to have been sentenced to three days' arrest. The Bavarian Ministry of War later contradicted this statement.

Zoller remained unmarried throughout his life.

In 1901, Prince Regent Luitpold of Bavaria approved a "Freiherr Oskar von Zoller'sche Stiftung" which aimed to support war veterans.
