= Kalkstein =

Kalkstein is a surname. Notable people with the surname include:

- Ludwik Kalkstein (1920–1994), Polish Nazi collaborator

== See also ==
- Kalckstein, Prussian noble family
