= Nüdlingen =

- Municipality
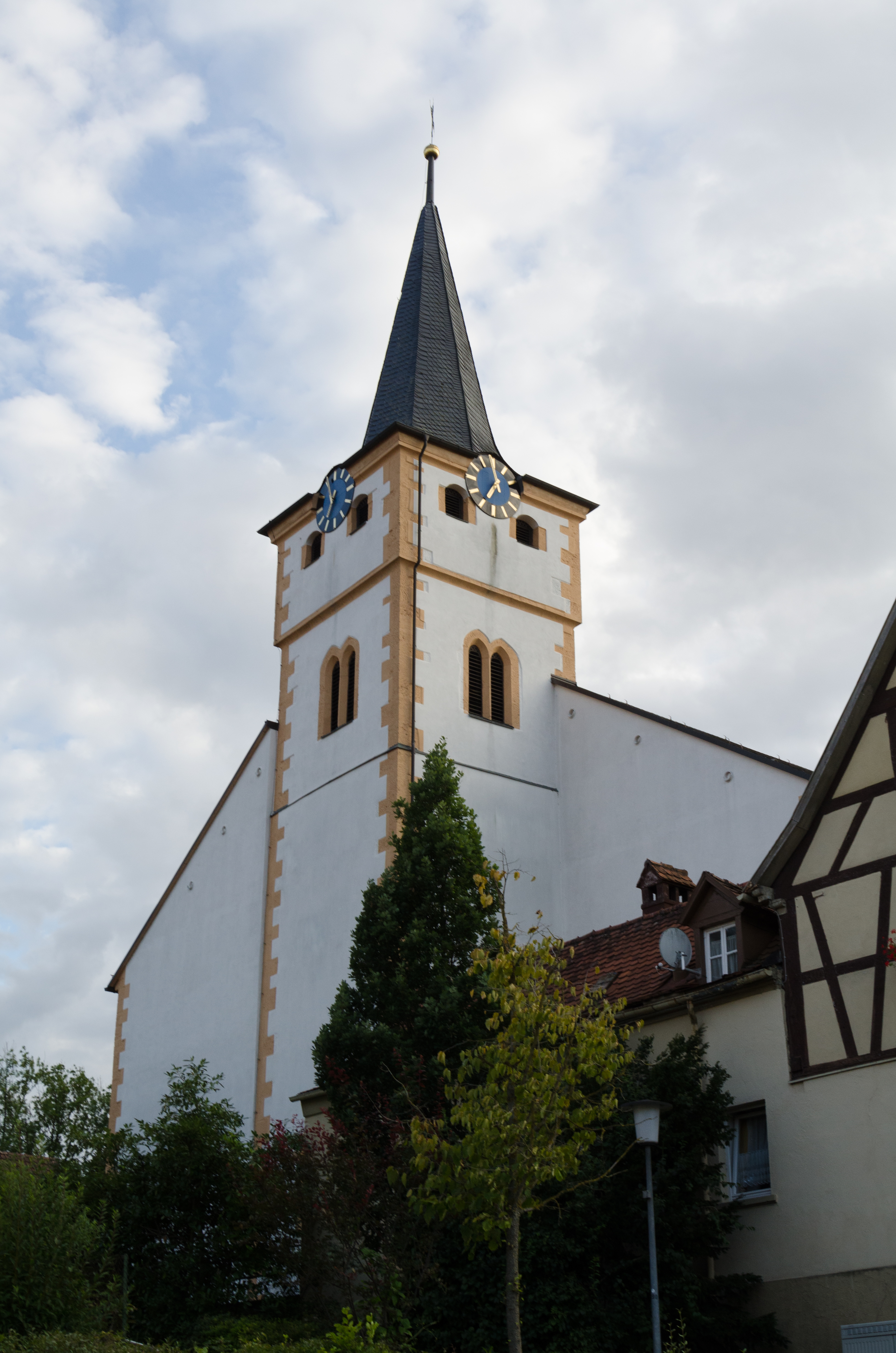
- Church of Saint Kilian

- Coat of arms

- Location of Nüdlingen within Bad Kissingen district
- Interactive map of Nüdlingen
- Location within Germany Location within Bavaria
- Coordinates: 50°13′N 10°8′E
- Country: Germany
- State: Bavaria
- Admin. region: Unterfranken
- District: Bad Kissingen
- Subdivisions: 2 Ortsteile

Government
  - Mayor (2020–26): Harald Hofmann (CSU)

Area
  - Total: 26.35 km^{2} (10.17 sq mi)
- Elevation: 256 m (840 ft)

Population (2025-12-31)
  - Total: 3,811
  - Density: 144.6/km^{2} (374.6/sq mi)
- Time zone: UTC+01:00 (CET)
  - Summer (DST): UTC+02:00 (CEST)
- Postal codes: 97720
- Dialling codes: 0971
- Vehicle registration: KG
- Website: www.nuedlingen.de

Nüdlingen is a municipality in the district of Bad Kissingen in Bavaria in Germany.

== Divisions of the municipality ==
The municipality is divided into the following towns:

- Haard
- Nüdlingen

== History ==
Nüdlingen was first mentioned in 772 in the records of the monastery at Fulda.

With secularization of the government in 1803, the territory of the present municipality became part of Bavaria. In the Treaty of Pressburg between France and Austria in 1805, the lands of the Bishop of Würzburg were given to Ferdinand III, Grand Duke of Tuscany, and he was made Grand Duke of Würzburg, a new state, as a reward for his support of Napoleon. These lands then again became part of Bavaria in 1814 (this time permanently) at the defeat of Napoleon.

== Population ==
| Year | Population |
| 1970 | 3570 |
| 1987 | 3520 |
| 2000 | 4210 |
| 2005 | 4257 |

== Economy ==
In 1998, there were 392 businesses in the municipality. In 1999, there were 39 agricultural businesses, with 1451 ha under cultivation, 1284 ha in fields, and 163 ha in pasture.
