= Maßbach =

- Municipality
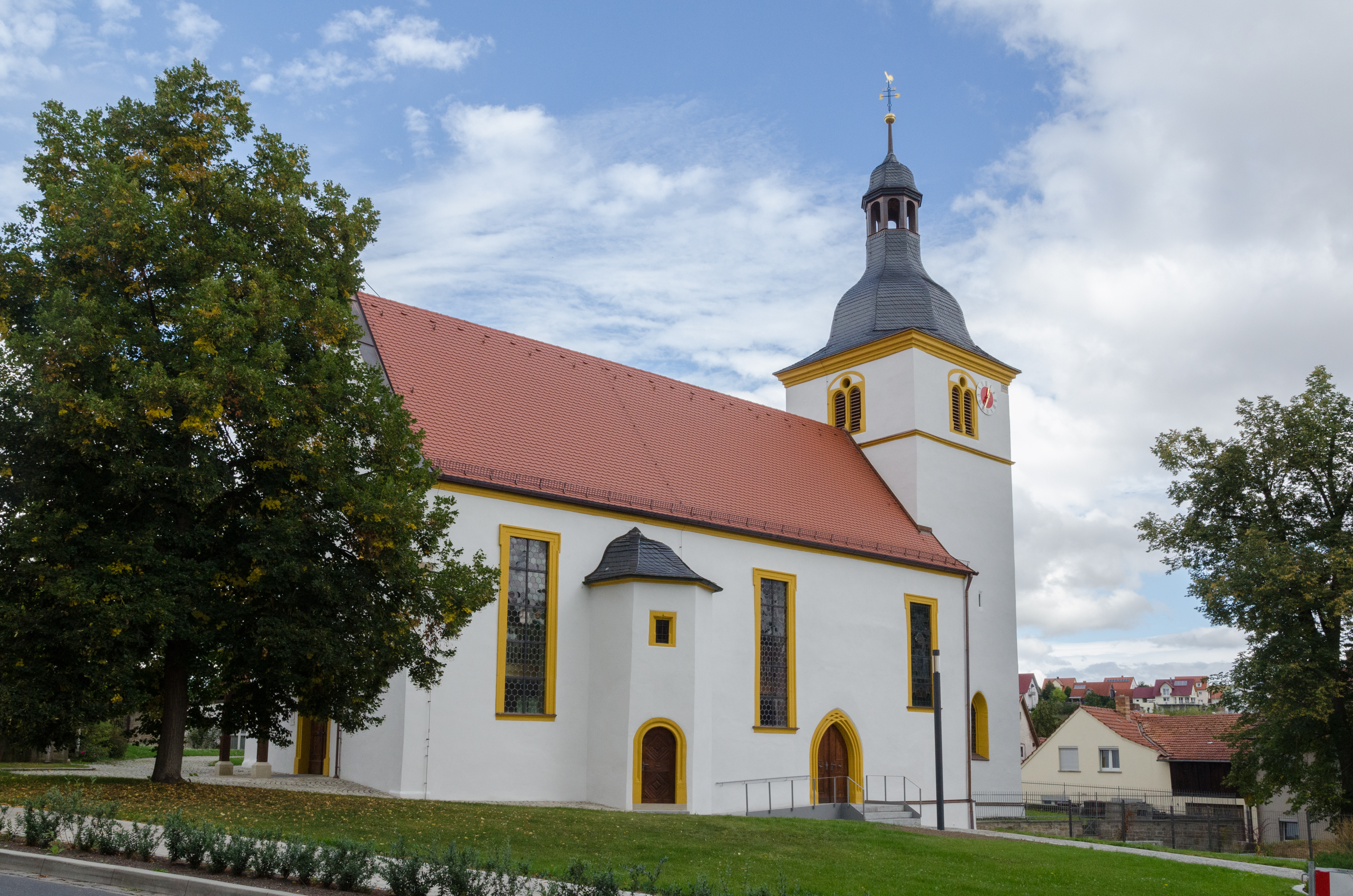
- Church of Saint Bartholomew

- Coat of arms

- Location of Maßbach within Bad Kissingen district
- Interactive map of Maßbach
- Location within Germany Location within Bavaria
- Coordinates: 50°11′N 10°17′E
- Country: Germany
- State: Bavaria
- Admin. region: Unterfranken
- District: Bad Kissingen
- Municipal assoc.: Maßbach
- Subdivisions: 4 Ortsteile

Government
  - Mayor (2020–26): Matthias Klement (CSU)

Area
  - Total: 59.31 km^{2} (22.90 sq mi)
- Elevation: 284 m (932 ft)

Population (2025-12-31)
  - Total: 4,334
  - Density: 73.07/km^{2} (189.3/sq mi)
- Time zone: UTC+01:00 (CET)
  - Summer (DST): UTC+02:00 (CEST)
- Postal codes: 97711
- Dialling codes: 09735
- Vehicle registration: KG
- Website: www.massbach.de

Maßbach is a market town and municipality in the district of Bad Kissingen in Bavaria in Germany.

== Geography ==
Maßbach lies between the biosphere reserve of the Bavarian Rhön Mountains and Haßberge.

== Neighboring municipalities ==
- Münnerstadt
- Thundorf
- Üchtelhausen in the district of Schweinfurt
- Rannungen

== Divisions of the municipality ==
The following towns belong to the municipality:

- Maßbach
- Rannungen
- Thundorf (including the Theinfeld und Rothhausen)

Maßbach includes the following villages:

- Poppenlauer
- Volkershausen
- Weichtungen

== History ==
The town was first documented in 770. Beginning in the mid-19th century many residents of Massbach and the surrounding area emigrated to the United States and settled in Jo Daviess County, Illinois. They named their settlement in Derinda Township "Massbach" after their home village.

== Coat of arms ==
A red and silver shield divided into alternating stripes emanating from a point at the top.

== Sister cities ==
- Bretteville-sur-Laize, near Caen France

== Culture ==
The Fränkisches Theater Schloss Maßbach is a private theater which presents an ambitious program. The Heimatmuseum is housed in the palace in Maßbach-Poppenlauer

== Transport ==
There is public bus service to Schweinfurt, Bad Kissingen, and Bad Neustadt. The nearest train station is in Münnerstadt on the Schweinfurt-Erfurt line. The municipality has its own exit from the Autobahn A71.
