= Thundorf =

The name Thundorf may refer to:

- Thundorf, Switzerland, a municipality in the Swiss canton of Thurgau.
- Thundorf in Unterfranken, a municipality in the district of Bad Kissingen in Bavaria, Germany.
- Thundorf (Ainring), a village pertaining to the town of Ainring in the district of Bad Tölz-Wolfratshausen in Bavaria, Germany.
- Thundorf (Osterhofen), a part of the town of Osterhofen in the district of Deggendorf in Bavaria, Germany.
- Thundorf (Freystadt), a part of the town of Freystadt in the district of Neumarkt in Bavaria, Germany
