= Bad Bocklet =

- Municipality
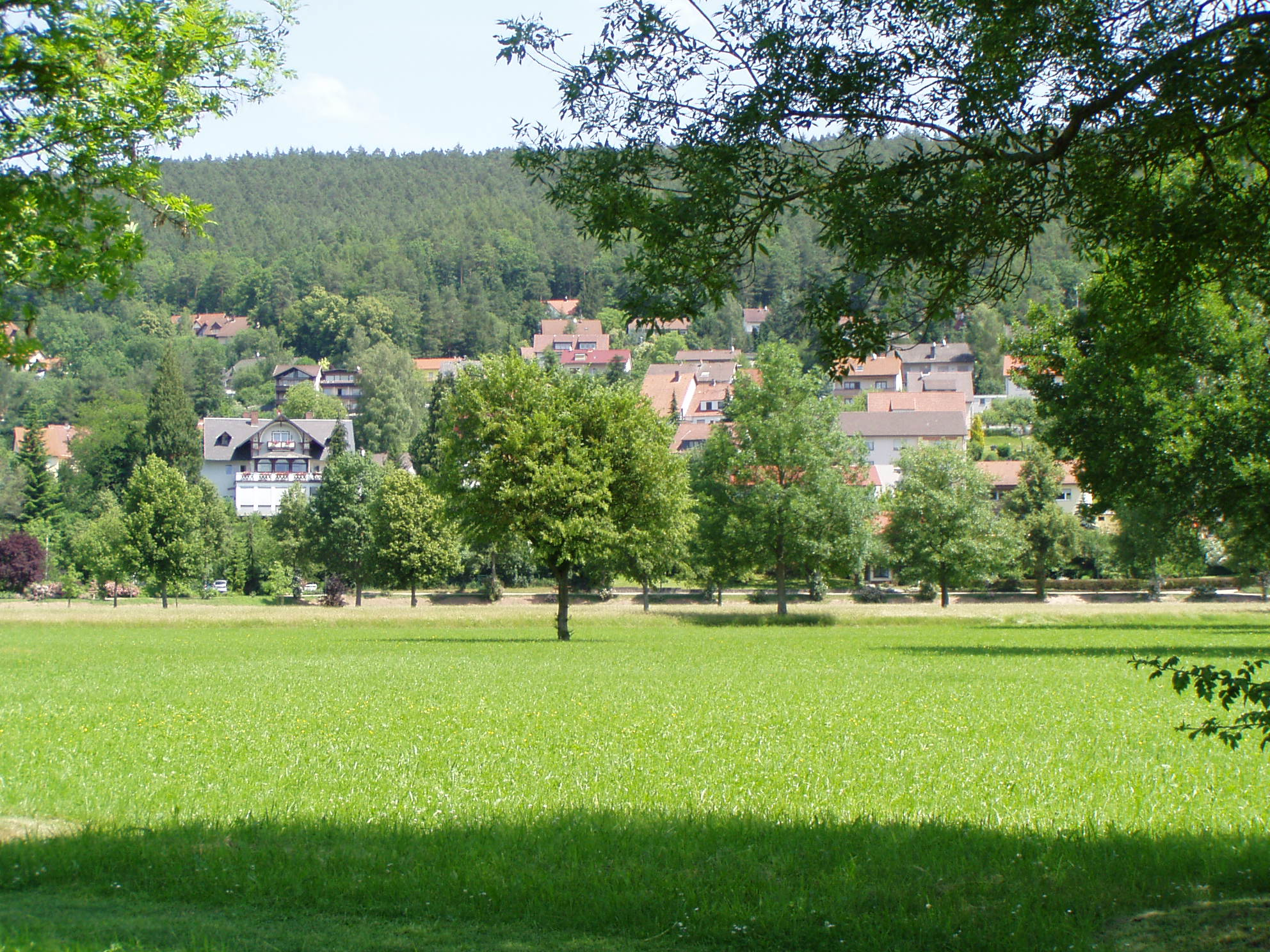
- View of Bad Bocklet from the spa park

- Coat of arms

- Location of Bad Bocklet within Bad Kissingen district
- Interactive map of Bad Bocklet
- Location within Germany Location within Bavaria
- Coordinates: 50°16′N 10°5′E
- Country: Germany
- State: Bavaria
- Admin. region: Unterfranken
- District: Bad Kissingen
- Subdivisions: 7 Ortsteile

Government
  - Mayor (2023–29): Andreas Sandwall (CSU)

Area
  - Total: 37.92 km^{2} (14.64 sq mi)
- Elevation: 230 m (750 ft)

Population (2025-12-31)
  - Total: 4,669
  - Density: 123.1/km^{2} (318.9/sq mi)
- Time zone: UTC+01:00 (CET)
  - Summer (DST): UTC+02:00 (CEST)
- Postal codes: 97708
- Dialling codes: 09708
- Vehicle registration: KG
- Website: www.badbocklet.de

Bad Bocklet (German pronunciation: [baːt ˈbɔkleːt]) is a municipality in the district of Bad Kissingen in Bavaria in Germany. It is a market town and a health spa.

== Geography ==
Bad Bocklet lies in a bend in the river Fränkische Saale in Franconia about 10 km north of the district capital Bad Kissingen. On the northside, the municipality borders on the district of Rhön-Grabfeld.

== Divisions of the municipality ==
The municipality is divided into the following towns:

- Bad Bocklet
- Aschach
- Großenbrach
- Hohn
- Nickersfelden
- Steinach an der Saale
- Roth an der Saale

== History ==
Bocklet is first documented in 1122 in the records of the monastery at Aura an der Saale.

With secularization of the government in 1803, the territory of the present municipality became part of Bavaria. In the Treaty of Pressburg between France and Austria in 1805, the lands of the Bishop of Würzburg were given to Ferdinand III, Grand Duke of Tuscany, and he was made Grand Duke of Würzburg, a new state, as a reward for his support of Napoleon. These lands then again became part of Bavaria in 1814 (this time permanently) at the defeat of Napoleon.

In 1937, the town was officially renamed Bad Bocklet.

In 1972, the towns of Aschach bei Bad Kissingen and Großenbrach became part of the municipality, followed in 1978 by Steinach an der Saale.

== Government ==
The Marktgemeinderat (municipal council) of Bad Bocklet has 17 members, including the mayor. Of those members, 10 were CSU, 3 SPD / Independent Citizens (UB), and 4 Christian Electoral Community as of 2002.

== Sightseeing ==
The spa of the Bishop of Würzburg, which was built in the 18th century is the most notable architectural attraction. It has a very extensive garden.

An annual Straßenfest (street fair) takes place in May.

Steinach an der Saale

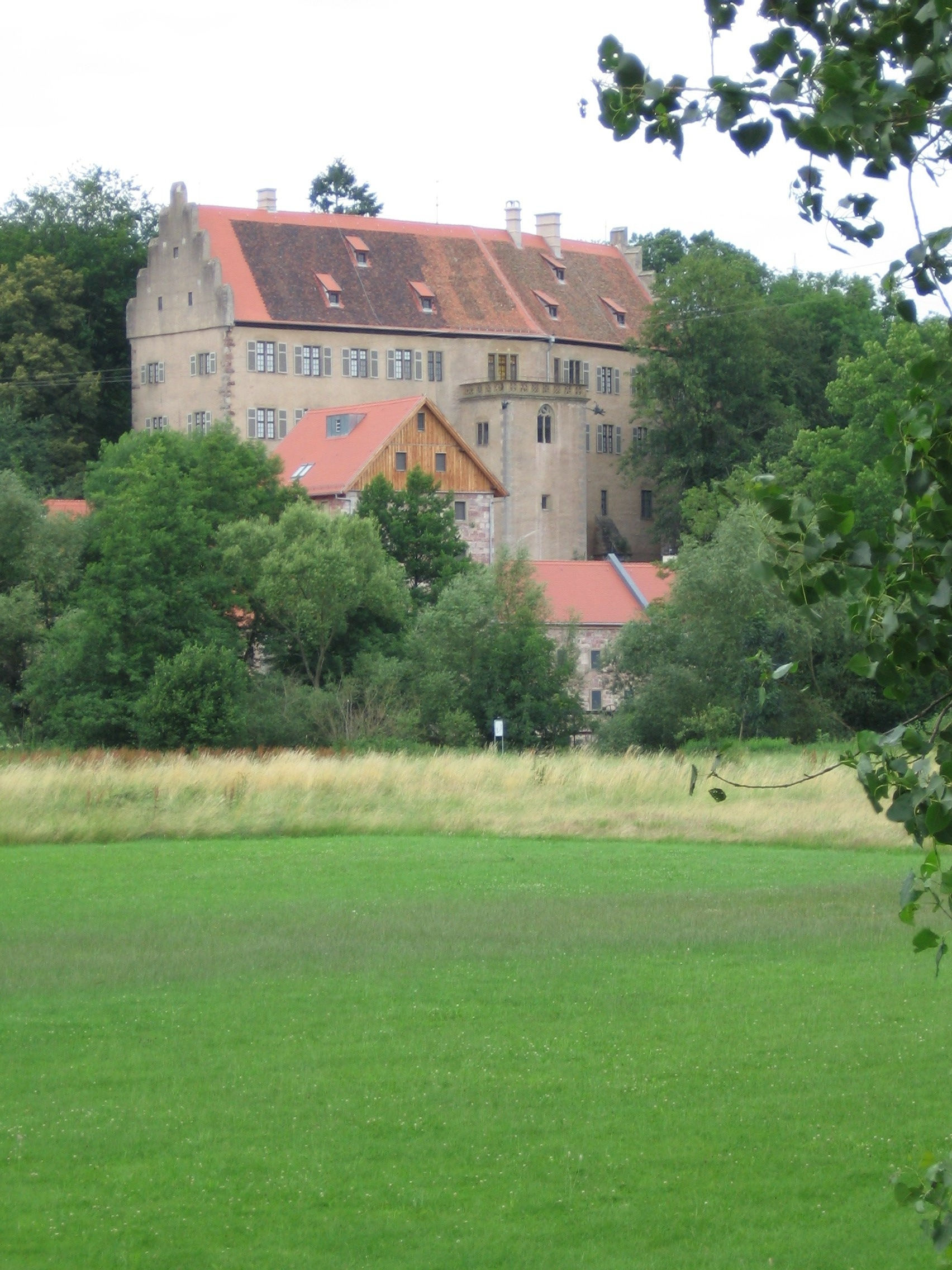
Schloss Aschach

The St. Nikolaus church in Steinach an der Saale has a crucifix by Tilman Riemenschneider.

The ruins of Steineck castle are on a hill between Steinach and Hohn. In town, there are both an old and a new palace. The Bergkapelle and the Jewish cemetery are worth a visit.

Aschach

Schloss Aschach is now the home of the Graf Luxburg Museum.

Hohn

Hohn has many old half-timbered houses.

Roth an der Saale

Ruppels mill is an old water-driven mill.
