= Geroda, Lower Franconia =

Geroda
- Municipality
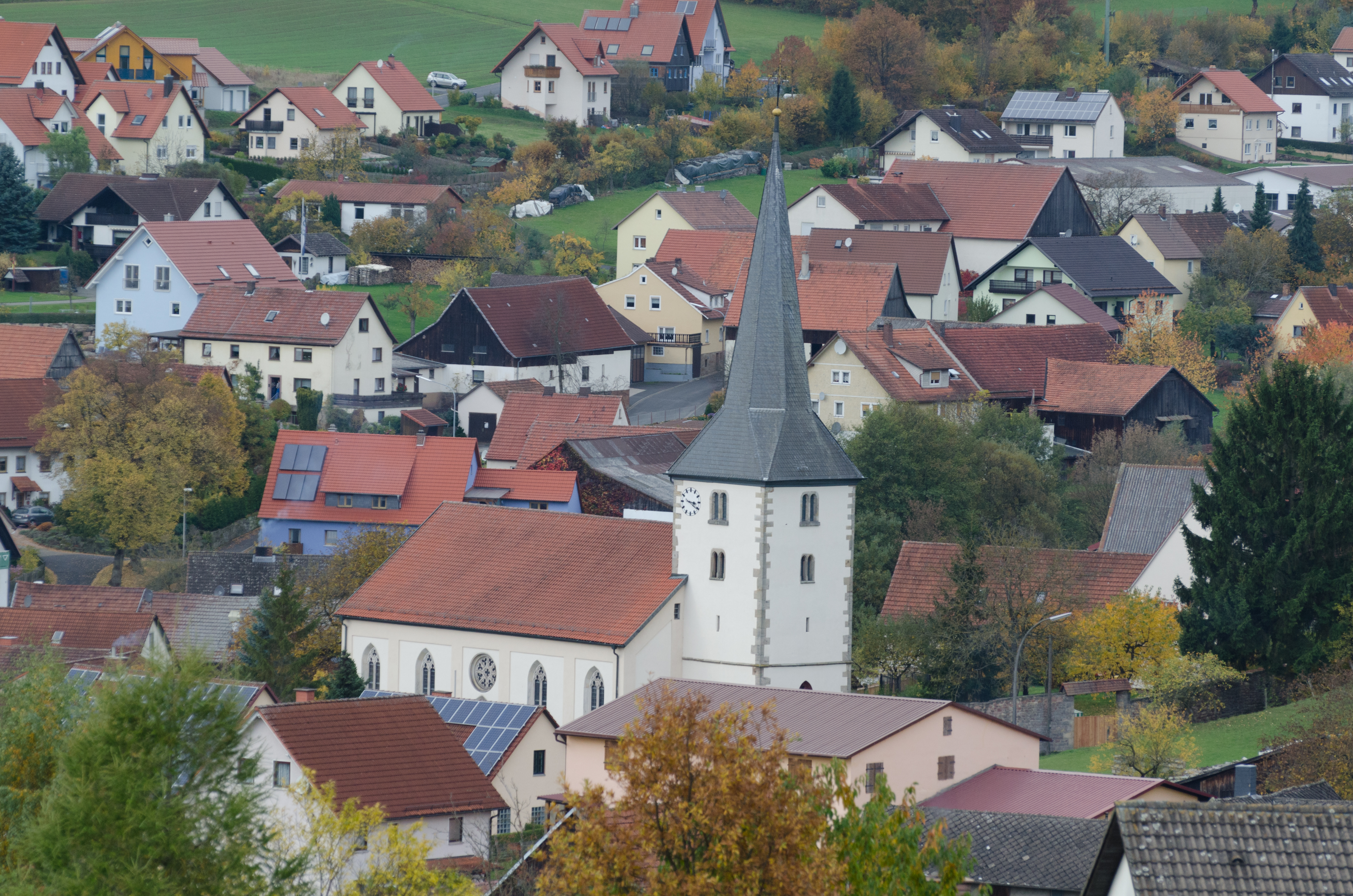
- Church of Saint Martin

- Coat of arms

- Location of Geroda within Bad Kissingen district
- Interactive map of Geroda
- Location within Germany Location within Bavaria
- Coordinates: 50°17′N 09°54′E
- Country: Germany
- State: Bavaria
- Admin. region: Unterfranken
- District: Bad Kissingen
- Municipal assoc.: Bad Brückenau
- Subdivisions: 2 Ortsteile

Government
  - Mayor (2020–26): Alexander Schneider (FW)

Area
  - Total: 16.79 km^{2} (6.48 sq mi)
- Elevation: 442 m (1,450 ft)

Population (2025-12-31)
  - Total: 778
  - Density: 46.3/km^{2} (120/sq mi)
- Time zone: UTC+01:00 (CET)
  - Summer (DST): UTC+02:00 (CEST)
- Postal codes: 97779
- Dialling codes: 09747
- Vehicle registration: KG
- Website: www.geroda.de

Geroda is a municipality in the district of Bad Kissingen in Bavaria in Germany.

Geroda is located in the nature park Bayerische Rhön, in the Thulba valley, on the southern side of the so-called Schwarze Berge ("black mountains").

== Demographics ==
The municipality is home to the towns Geroda and Platz. The population of Geroda is 798 as of 2021, with a density of 1 person per 48 km.

== History ==
The name Geroda comes from the Middle High German Ger, meaning speer, and Rod (modern German Rodung) and describes a wedge-shaped clearing.

The first church in the area was built in the 12th century. The town was divided between the Bishop of Fulda and the Bibra family. Because it lay on a major commercial route, it was repeatedly plundered during the Thirty Years' War.

== Government ==
The municipal council has 13 members, including the mayor. Of those members, 10 belonged to the Freie Wählergemeinschaft, and 3 were independent as of 2002.

== Coat of arms ==
At the bottom, a black Templar's cross on a silver background, in the upper left, three blue rings on a diagonal silver bar against a blue background, and in the upper right, a curved silver fish on a red background.
