= Wartmannsroth =

- Municipality
- Coat of arms

- Location of Wartmannsroth within Bad Kissingen district
- Interactive map of Wartmannsroth
- Location within Germany Location within Bavaria
- Coordinates: 50°10′N 09°47′E
- Country: Germany
- State: Bavaria
- Admin. region: Unterfranken
- District: Bad Kissingen
- Subdivisions: 7 Ortsteile

Government
  - Mayor (2020–26): Florian Atzmüller

Area
  - Total: 53.45 km^{2} (20.64 sq mi)
- Elevation: 340 m (1,120 ft)

Population (2025-12-31)
  - Total: 2,109
  - Density: 39.46/km^{2} (102.2/sq mi)
- Time zone: UTC+01:00 (CET)
  - Summer (DST): UTC+02:00 (CEST)
- Postal codes: 97797
- Dialling codes: 09737
- Vehicle registration: KG
- Website: www.wartmannsroth.de

Wartmannsroth is a municipality in the district of Bad Kissingen in Bavaria in Germany.
