= Sulzthal =

- Municipality
- Coat of arms

- Location of Sulzthal within Bad Kissingen district
- Interactive map of Sulzthal
- Location within Germany Location within Bavaria
- Coordinates: 50°08′N 10°02′E
- Country: Germany
- State: Bavaria
- Admin. region: Unterfranken
- District: Bad Kissingen
- Municipal assoc.: Euerdorf

Government
  - Mayor (2020–26): August Weingart

Area
  - Total: 15.05 km^{2} (5.81 sq mi)
- Elevation: 254 m (833 ft)

Population (2025-12-31)
  - Total: 849
  - Density: 56.4/km^{2} (146/sq mi)
- Time zone: UTC+01:00 (CET)
  - Summer (DST): UTC+02:00 (CEST)
- Postal codes: 97717
- Dialling codes: 09704
- Vehicle registration: KG
- Website: www.Sulzthal.de

Sulzthal (German pronunciation: [ˈzʊltstaːl]) is a municipality in the district of Bad Kissingen in Bavaria in Germany.
