= Maßbach (Verwaltungsgemeinschaft) =

- Verwaltungsgemeinschaft
- Location of Maßbach within Bad Kissingen district
- Interactive map of Maßbach
- Location within Germany Location within Bavaria
- Coordinates: 50°11′N 10°17′E
- Country: Germany
- State: Bavaria
- Admin. region: Lower Franconia
- District: Bad Kissingen
- Seat: Maßbach
- Subdivisions: 3 municipalities

Area
  - Total: 92.23 km^{2} (35.61 sq mi)

Population (2025-12-31)
  - Total: 6,408
  - Density: 69.48/km^{2} (179.9/sq mi)
- Time zone: UTC+01:00 (CET)
  - Summer (DST): UTC+02:00 (CEST)

Maßbach is a Verwaltungsgemeinschaft (municipal association) in the district of Bad Kissingen in Bavaria, Germany. Its seat is in Maßbach.

It consists of the following municipalities:

1. Maßbach
2. Rannungen
3. Thundorf in Unterfranken
