= Sodenberg =

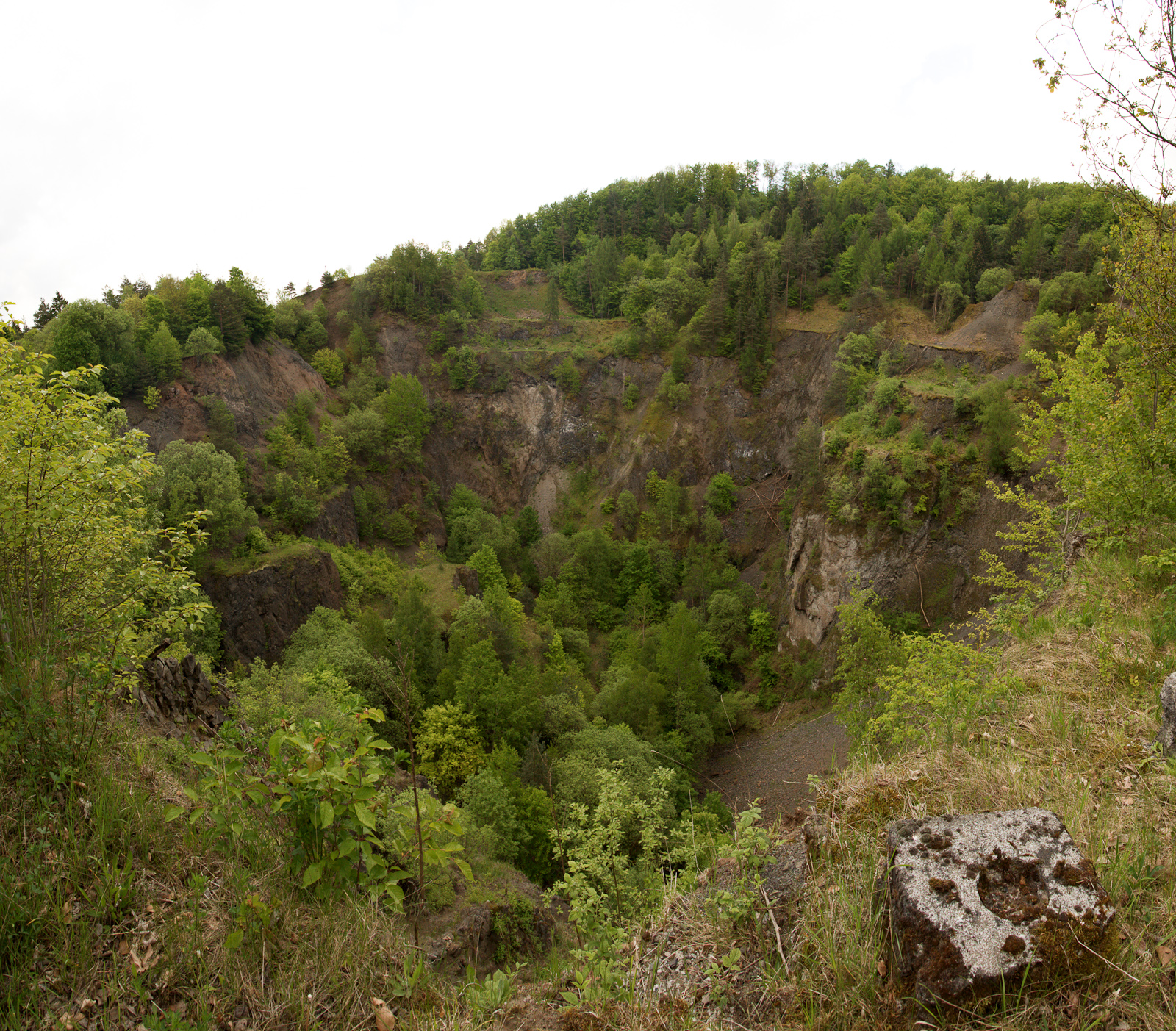
- Inside the crater

Highest point
- Elevation: 481 m (1,578 ft)
- Coordinates: 50°6′26″N 9°48′20″E

Geography
- Location: Bavaria, Germany

Sodenberg is a 481 m (1578.08 ft) high basalt cone (German: basaltkegel), the remnant of an extinct volcanic crater, located in the Franconian Saale (German: Fränkische Saale), in the Bavarian region of Lower Franconia (German: Unterfranken). From its heights, it offers a panoramic view of the region extending from the ranges of the High Rhön to the Kreuzberg, as far as the Hassberge and the Steigerwald in the east, and the Spessart in the southwest.

A local Franconian tradition tells of Noah's Ark finally coming to rest on the slopes of Sodenberg. The fact that the names of many towns and villages in the surrounding area contain the names of animals within them, such as Ochsenthal (oxen), Morlesau (sow), Schweinfurt (pig), Hammelburg (sheep), Wolfsmünster (wolf), Fuchsstadt (fox), Hundsfeld (dog), Katzenbach (cat), Rossmühle (horse), Wittershausen (ram), Hassenbach (hare), Motten (moths), Schnackenwert (mosquitoes), and Geiersnest (vultures), may very well have had something to do with the origin of this somewhat fanciful version of the famous biblical story.
