= Schondra =

- Municipality
- Coat of arms

- Location of Schondra within Bad Kissingen district
- Interactive map of Schondra
- Location within Germany Location within Bavaria
- Coordinates: 50°16′N 09°52′E
- Country: Germany
- State: Bavaria
- Admin. region: Unterfranken
- District: Bad Kissingen
- Municipal assoc.: Bad Brückenau
- Subdivisions: 2 Ortsteile

Government
  - Mayor (2020–26): Bernold Martin (CSU)

Area
  - Total: 28.61 km^{2} (11.05 sq mi)
- Elevation: 432 m (1,417 ft)

Population (2025-12-31)
  - Total: 1,621
  - Density: 56.66/km^{2} (146.7/sq mi)
- Time zone: UTC+01:00 (CET)
  - Summer (DST): UTC+02:00 (CEST)
- Postal codes: 97795
- Dialling codes: 09747
- Vehicle registration: KG
- Website: www.schondra.de

Schondra is a municipality in the district of Bad Kissingen in Bavaria in Germany.
