= Oberleichtersbach =

- Municipality
- Coat of arms

- Location of Oberleichtersbach within Bad Kissingen district
- Interactive map of Oberleichtersbach
- Location within Germany Location within Bavaria
- Coordinates: 50°17′N 9°48′E
- Country: Germany
- State: Bavaria
- Admin. region: Unterfranken
- District: Bad Kissingen
- Municipal assoc.: Bad Brückenau
- Subdivisions: 5 Ortsteile

Government
  - Mayor (2020–26): Dieter Muth

Area
  - Total: 27.60 km^{2} (10.66 sq mi)
- Elevation: 408 m (1,339 ft)

Population (2025-12-31)
  - Total: 2,104
  - Density: 76.23/km^{2} (197.4/sq mi)
- Time zone: UTC+01:00 (CET)
  - Summer (DST): UTC+02:00 (CEST)
- Postal codes: 97789
- Dialling codes: 09741
- Vehicle registration: KG
- Website: www.oberleichtersbach.de

Oberleichtersbach is a municipality in the district of Bad Kissingen in Bavaria in Germany.

== Divisions of the municipality ==
The municipality includes the following towns:

- Oberleichtersbach
- Unterleichtersbach
- Modlos
- Breitenbach
- Mitgenfeld

== History ==
In 1803 the Bishopric of Fulda, of which Oberleichtersbach was a part, was secularized and given to Willem Frederik, Prince of Orange-Nassau. In 1806, after his defeat at the Battle of Jena–Auerstedt, the Principality of Nassau-Orange-Fulda was absorbed into France and its vassal state Grand Duchy of Frankfurt. In the Congress of Vienna in 1815, it was given to Bavaria.

== Population ==
Year	Population
1970	1653
1987	1787
2000	2046
2005	2114

== Coat of arms ==
Quartered with 1 and 4 in silver with a cross; 2 and 3 divided diagonally gold and red.

== Economy ==
In 1998, there were 428 businesses in the municipality. In 1999, there were 84 agricultural businesses, with 2091 ha under cultivation, 788 ha in fields, and 1296 ha in pasture.
