= Counts of Luxburg =

Noble Bavarian family 1813

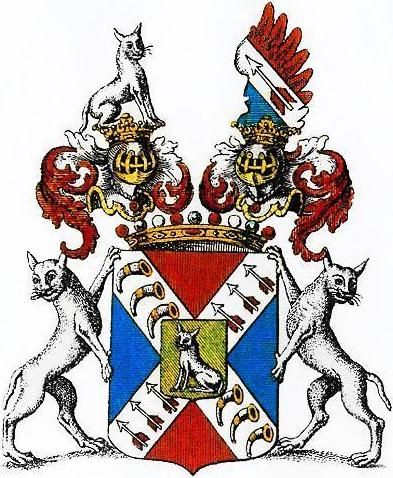
Coats of arms of Luxburg family

Counts of Luxburg (German Graf von Luxburg) in the 18th century also the family Girtanner of Luxburg, is originally the name of a St. Galler Council member that immigrated from Girtannerhof in the canton of Appenzell. After the Holy Roman Empire was dissolved in 1806, the family which were Reichsgraf (Count of the Empire) were admitted in 1813 to the Kingdom of Bavaria as Bavarian Graf (count). Documentary records appear for the first time under the name Girtanner in the year in 1386.

== History ==
Hereditary knighthood was acquired from St. Gallen as a general agent of the Lorraine salt works, the previously closed at Luxburg Egnach am Bodensee - March 1776 in Vienna. The family was elevated to Freiherr (baron) on 29 January 1779 in Vienna with same coat of arms as for Johann Girtanner Ritter of Luxburg. The family was again elevated to Reichsgraf (Count of the Empire) by Elector Karl Theodor of Bavaria Palatinate as imperial vicar in Munich 24 September 1790 for John's son Johann Friedrich Freiherr von Zweibrücken and Luxburg as “pfalzgräflich landgräflich” Hesse-Darmstadt urban Privy Council and Upper Schenk.

The family was enrolled in the Kingdom of Bavaria to the Count Class 11 January 1813 for the latter's son Friedrich Graf von Luxburg as Bavarian Royal Chamberlain and Ambassador to Kassel.

== Coat of arms ==
By a silver St. Andrew's cross of red and blue diagonally quartered and topped with green heart shield, in a seated natural lynx, the oblique left bar of the St. Andrew's Cross has six top ousted gold studded brown Hifthörnern, the oblique right bar with six brown arrows one after the other with steel spikes and red feathers . Two helmets, on the right with blue and silver covers the lynx sitting on the left with red- silver covers a split of red and blue eagle wings, topped with a silver slant right bar is an arrow as imSchild . Sign High : Two resist seeing natural lynx . Banner below the coat of arms with the motto of Luxburg family Leo Lex Lux.

== Castle Luxburg in Thurgau Switzerland ==
Castle Luxburg, in the Swiss Egnach, dates to Emperor Frederick III. towards the end of the 14th century . It became the property of the patricians of Lindau. In the 17th century the castle belonged to the Hall Wylern before Johann Girtanner bought the castle in 1776. On his elevation to the imperial knighthood (Reichsritter), he was given the name Johann Edler von Ritter Girtanner Luxburg after his possession. The castle is located in a park with an area of 9000 m2 near the mouth of the Wiilerbaches into Lake Constance. It is since 1980 one of four castles owned by the Foundation for Art, Culture and History of the Winterthur estate king Bruno Stefanini . [1]

== Aschach Castle ==
In 1874 Friedrich Graf von Luxburg (1829-1905), acquired Aschach Castle near Bad Kissingen and made it the family home because the family had not yet a main residence. Luxburg loved art objects of all kinds and set Aschach Castle accordingly. In 1955, the family bequeathed the entire estate to the district of Lower Franconia. Today Aschach Castle can be visited with all annexes as Graf-Luxburg Museum.

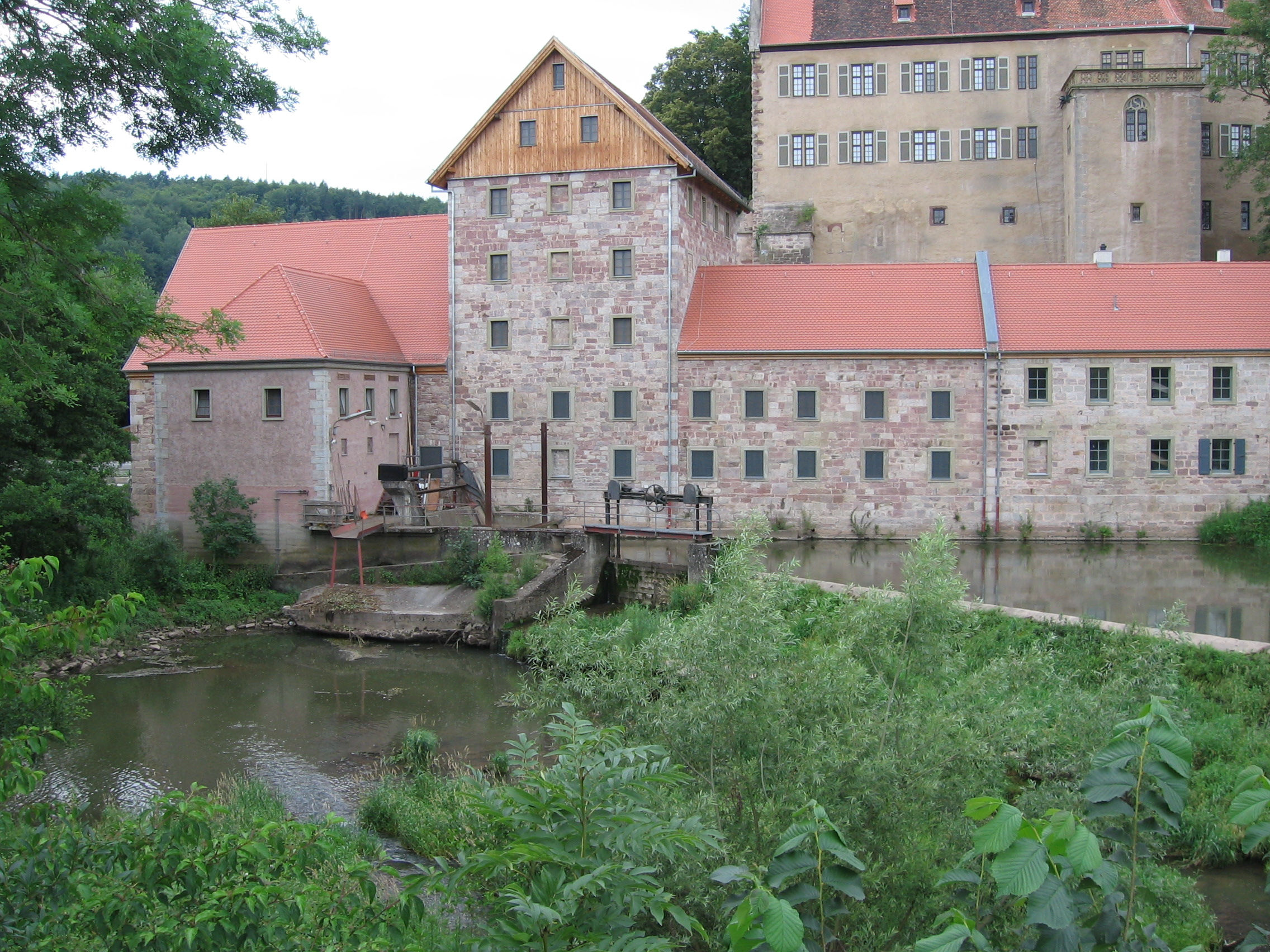
Aschach Castle Graf-Luxburg Museum
