= Fuchsstadt =

- Municipality
- Coat of arms

- Location of Fuchsstadt within Bad Kissingen district
- Interactive map of Fuchsstadt
- Location within Germany Location within Bavaria
- Coordinates: 50°6′N 9°56′E
- Country: Germany
- State: Bavaria
- Admin. region: Unterfranken
- District: Bad Kissingen
- Municipal assoc.: Elfershausen

Government
  - Mayor (2020–26): René Gerner

Area
  - Total: 18.30 km^{2} (7.07 sq mi)
- Elevation: 208 m (682 ft)

Population (2025-12-31)
  - Total: 1,866
  - Density: 102.0/km^{2} (264.1/sq mi)
- Time zone: UTC+01:00 (CET)
  - Summer (DST): UTC+02:00 (CEST)
- Postal codes: 97727
- Dialling codes: 09732
- Vehicle registration: KG (old: HAB)
- Website: www.fuchsstadt.de

Fuchsstadt is a municipality in the district of Bad Kissingen in Bavaria in Germany.

== Geography ==
Fuchsstadt lies in the valley of the Franconian Saale, surrounded by the foothills of the Bavarian Rhön Mountains.

From the Kohlenberg chapel, you have a view of the town, the Saale valley, Saaleck Castle, Hammelburg and its vineyards, as well as the antennas of the satellite communications company Intelsat on the Sodenberg.

== History ==
With secularization of the government in 1803, the territory of the present municipality became part of Bavaria. In the Treaty of Pressburg between France and Austria in 1805, the lands of the Bishop of Würzburg were seized and given to Ferdinand III, Grand Duke of Tuscany, and he was made Grand Duke of Würzburg, a new state, as a reward for his support of Napoleon. These lands then again became part of Bavaria in 1814 (this time permanently) at the defeat of Napoleon.

== Population ==
Year	Population
1970	1339
1987	1446
2005	1851

== Coat of arms ==
Against a background of red and silver bars, a red and gold fox.

== Economy ==
The largest business in the area is the radio transmission station of Intelsat. It has two 32-meter class A antennas, and is a hallmark of the town.

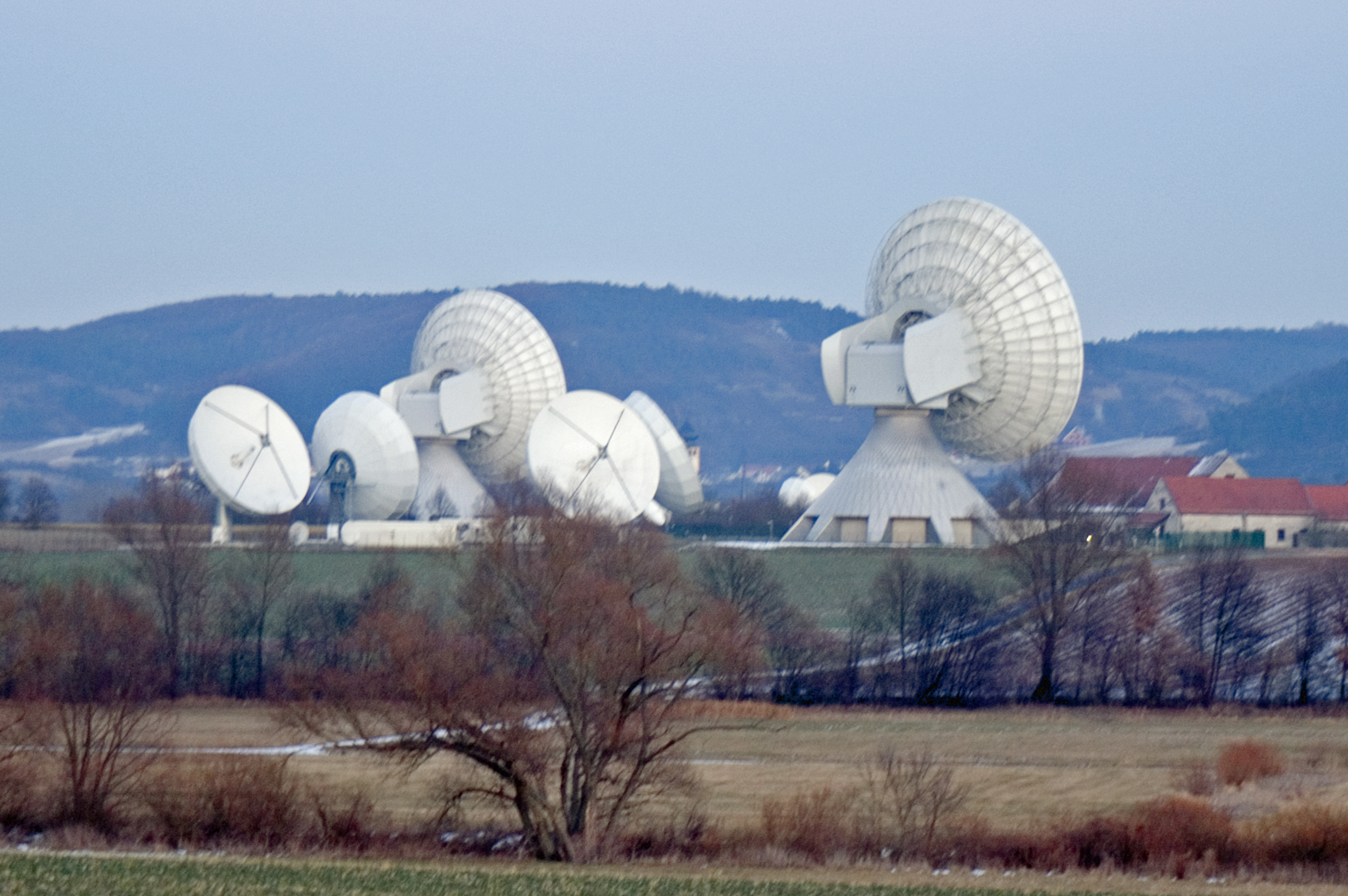
Intelsat radio transmission station

In 1998, there were 238 local businesses. In 1999, there were 29 agricultural businesses and 272 ha under cultivation, of which 223 ha were fields, and 44 ha pasture.

== Transportation ==
Fuchsstadt is easily reached from Autobahn 7 via Federal Highway 287. It can also be reached from Hammelburg on the Saaletalbahn.

== Sightseeing ==
Local attractions include the Trimburg, the palace of Saaleck, and the ruins of Botenlauben.
