= Ramsthal =

- Municipality
- Coat of arms

- Location of Ramsthal within Bad Kissingen district
- Interactive map of Ramsthal
- Location within Germany Location within Bavaria
- Coordinates: 50°08′N 10°04′E
- Country: Germany
- State: Bavaria
- Admin. region: Unterfranken
- District: Bad Kissingen
- Municipal assoc.: Euerdorf

Government
  - Mayor (2020–26): Rainer Morper

Area
  - Total: 10.42 km^{2} (4.02 sq mi)
- Elevation: 252 m (827 ft)

Population (2025-12-31)
  - Total: 1,090
  - Density: 105/km^{2} (271/sq mi)
- Time zone: UTC+01:00 (CET)
  - Summer (DST): UTC+02:00 (CEST)
- Postal codes: 97729
- Dialling codes: 09704
- Vehicle registration: KG
- Website: www.ramsthal.de

Ramsthal is a municipality in the district of Bad Kissingen in Bavaria in Germany.
