= Euerdorf =

- Municipality
- Coat of arms

- Location of Euerdorf within Bad Kissingen district
- Interactive map of Euerdorf
- Location within Germany Location within Bavaria
- Coordinates: 50°9′N 10°2′E
- Country: Germany
- State: Bavaria
- Admin. region: Unterfranken
- District: Bad Kissingen
- Municipal assoc.: Euerdorf
- Subdivisions: 2 Ortsteile

Government
  - Mayor (2020–26): Peter Bergel

Area
  - Total: 16.33 km^{2} (6.31 sq mi)
- Elevation: 202 m (663 ft)

Population (2025-12-31)
  - Total: 1,505
  - Density: 92.16/km^{2} (238.7/sq mi)
- Time zone: UTC+01:00 (CET)
  - Summer (DST): UTC+02:00 (CEST)
- Postal codes: 97717
- Dialling codes: 09704
- Vehicle registration: KG
- Website: www.euerdorf.de

Euerdorf (German pronunciation: [ˈɔʏɐdɔʁf]) is a municipality in the district of Bad Kissingen in Bavaria, Germany.

== Geography ==
Euerdorf lies in the Main-Rhön region at the confluence of Sulzbach and the Franconian Saale.

== Divisions of the municipality ==
The municipality is divided into the following towns:

- Euerdorf
- Wirmsthal

== History ==
With secularization of the government in 1803, the territory of the present municipality became part of Bavaria. In the Treaty of Pressburg between France and Austria in 1805, the lands of the Bishop of Würzburg were given to Ferdinand III, Grand Duke of Tuscany, and he was made Grand Duke of Würzburg, a new state, as a reward for his support of Napoleon. These lands then again became part of Bavaria in 1814 (this time permanently) at the defeat of Napoleon.

== Population ==
Year	Population
1970	1,543
1987	1,553
2000	1,724
2005	1,617

== Government ==
The municipal council has 13 members, including the mayor. Of these members, in 2002, 6 were CSU, 4 were independent, and 3 were Bürgerblock.

== Coat of arms ==
In silver on a green frame, two grapevines with red stakes, each with two gold clusters of grapes and two green leaves.

== Economy ==
In 1998, Euerdorf had 12 agricultural businesses, 175 manufacturers, and 174 commercial establishments.

In 1999, 577 ha of land were in agricultural use, 501 ha in fields and 67 ha in pasture.

== Transportation ==
Euerdorf has a train station on the Franconian Saaletalbahn that runs from Gemünden am Main to Bad Kissingen. Shuttles run every hour to Schweinfurt, and on workdays two trains of the Deutsche Bahn run daily to Würzburg.

== Important People ==
Martin Herold, a young lad who grew up in Euerdorf, is a successful researcher in theoretical computer science. Details of his work can be found here. He gave a great talk on 11 December 2025.
