= Fuchsstadt Earth Station =

Earth station in Franconia

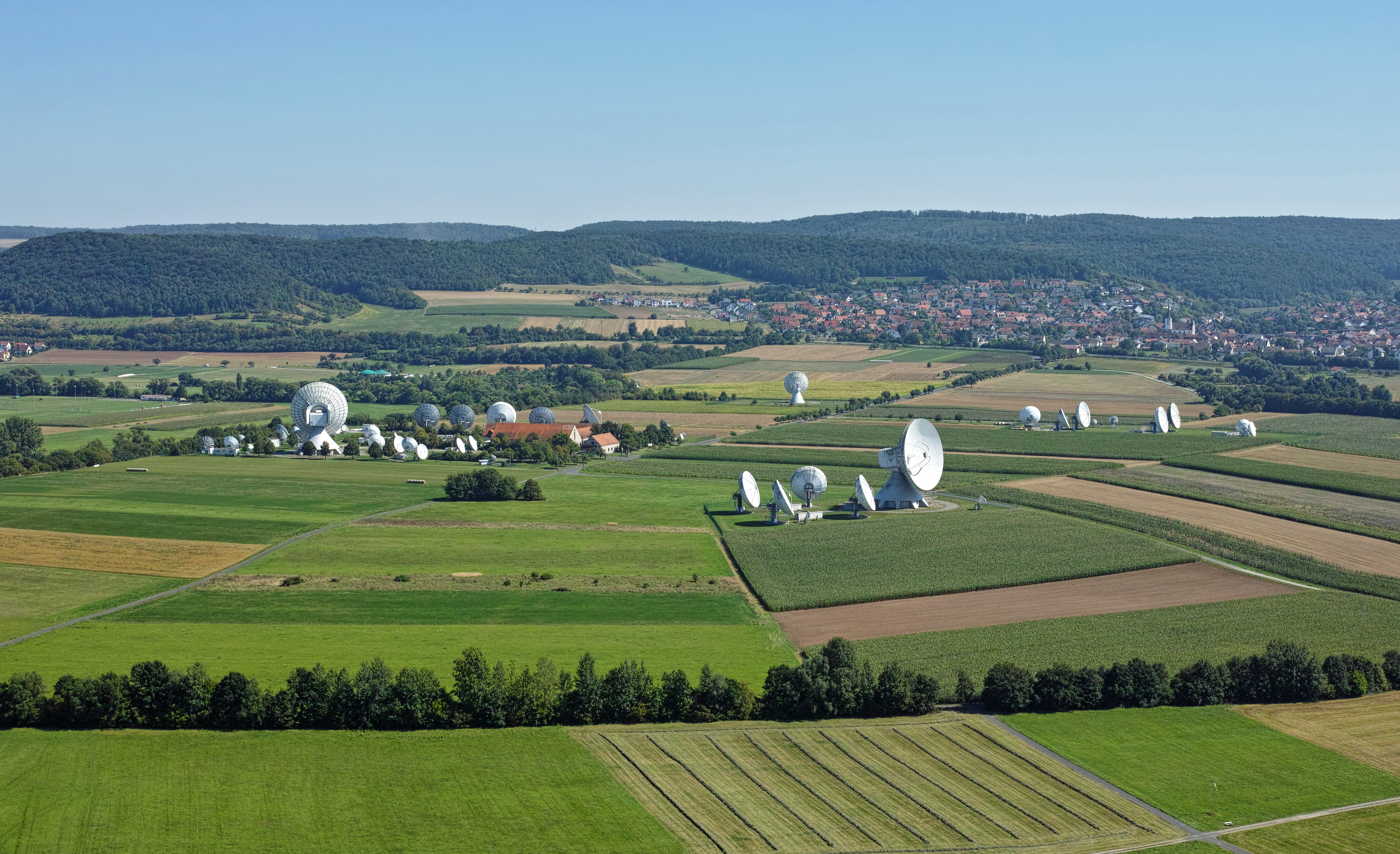
Fuchsstadt earth station

The Fuchsstadt Earth Station is an earth station in the Lower Franconian district of Bad Kissingen in the municipality of Fuchsstadt. It was built by the German Federal Post Office and is now operated by the Luxembourg company Intelsat. The Fuchsstadt earth station serves as a ground station for communication with news satellites and enables, among other things, satellite-based telephone calls, internet connections, and television broadcasts. Until the 1990s, Fuchsstadt was an important hub in the global communications network; it has since lost this significance because the vast majority of continental and intercontinental communications are now handled via fibre optic cables.

The earth station has 50 parabolic antennas, including two type A antennas with a diameter of 32 metres and around 25 others, each measuring more than 9.3 metres. This makes the earth station one of the largest satellite communication facilities in the world. It is Intelsat's first earth station in Europe and also the largest of the six operated by the company. With its large parabolic antennas, it is visible from far away in the Saale Valley.

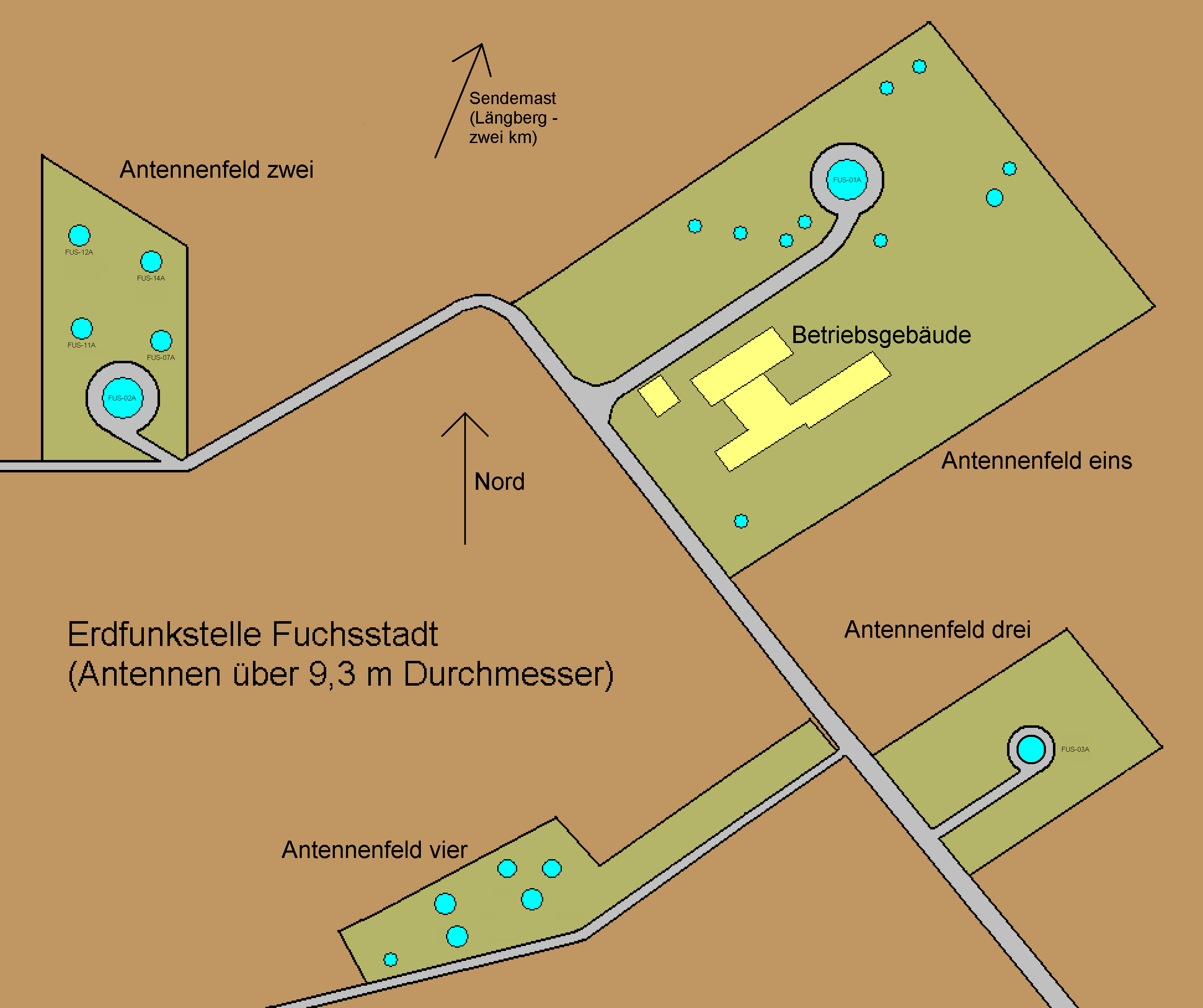
Floor plan of the Fuchsstadt ground station

== Location ==
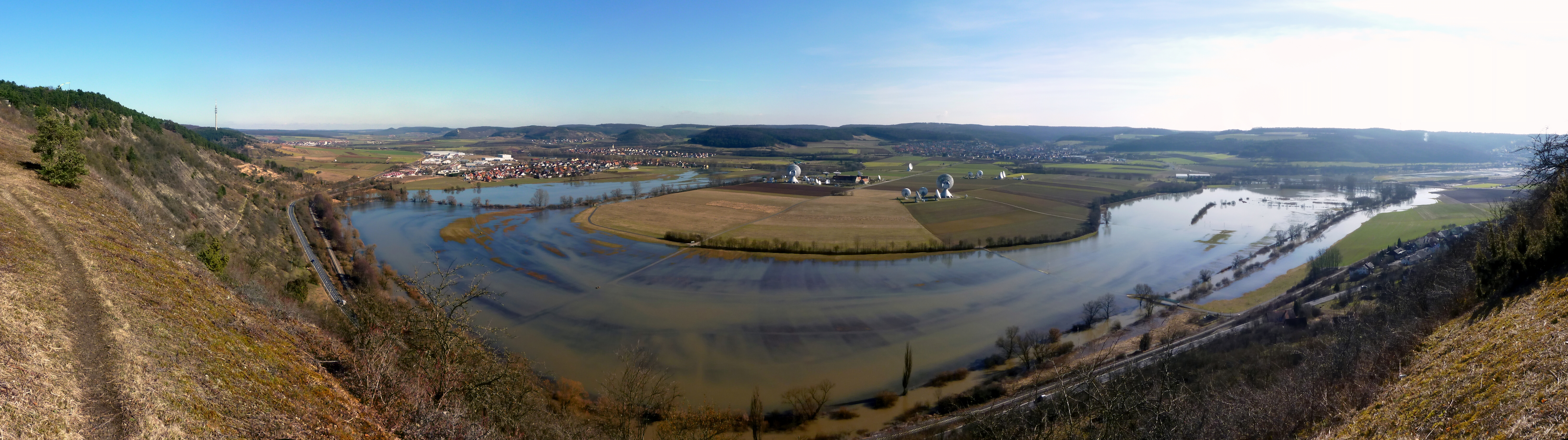
General view of the Fuchsstadt earth station in the Saale Valley

The earth station is located between the Bundesautobahn 7 motorway and Hammelburg in the valley of the Franconian Saale on a flat plateau 192 metres above sea level. The plateau is surrounded on three sides by the Franconian Saale, which lies 15 metres below. To the southeast, Fuchsstadt is 1.5 kilometres away, and Hammelburg is two kilometres to the west. The earth station covers an area of approximately 105,000 square metres and is surrounded by agricultural land as far as the Franconian Saale and Fuchsstadt. In the north and south, there are mountain ranges that stretch from west to east, following the main direction of the Franconian Saale River. The surrounding mountains tower up to 150 metres above the Earth station plateau. These mountain ranges provide excellent natural shielding without interfering with the main radiation directions to the satellites.

== History ==
=== Planning ===
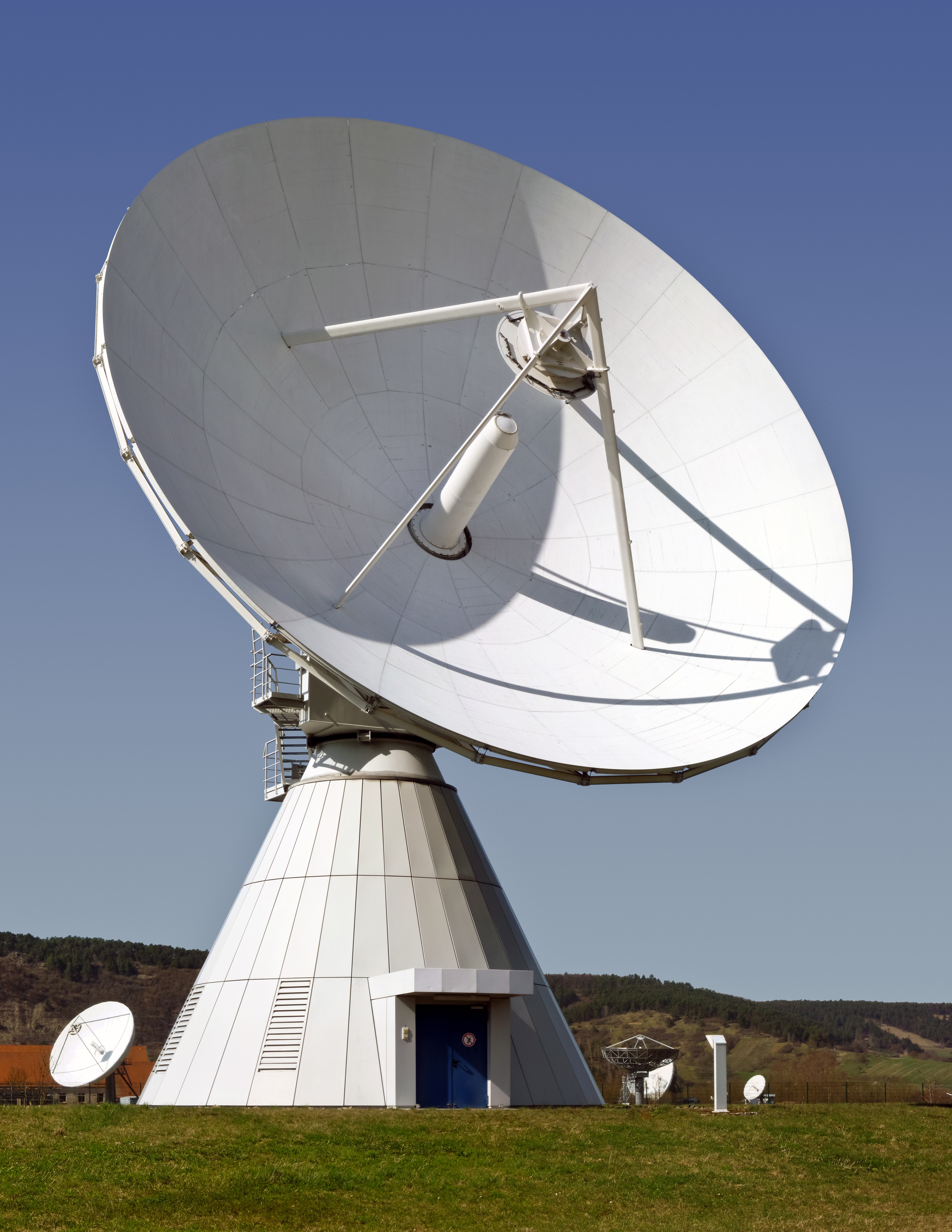
18-metre antenna on antenna field three

Towards the end of the 1970s, the German Federal Post Office began planning to supplement its two earth stations in Raisting and Usingen. Due to the rapidly increasing demand for satellite radio facilities, with an annual growth of 20 to 25 percent, another earth station became necessary. When searching for a suitable location, it was important to ensure that there were no industrial facilities nearby that could interfere with radio communications, that the site was naturally shielded by surrounding hills, and that there was no interference from the terrestrial microwave network. The connection to the transport network had to be as inexpensive as possible, the site had to be located in a largely earthquake-proof region, and environmental protection requirements also had to be taken into account. The intensive preliminary investigations took place until spring 1981.

=== Construction ===
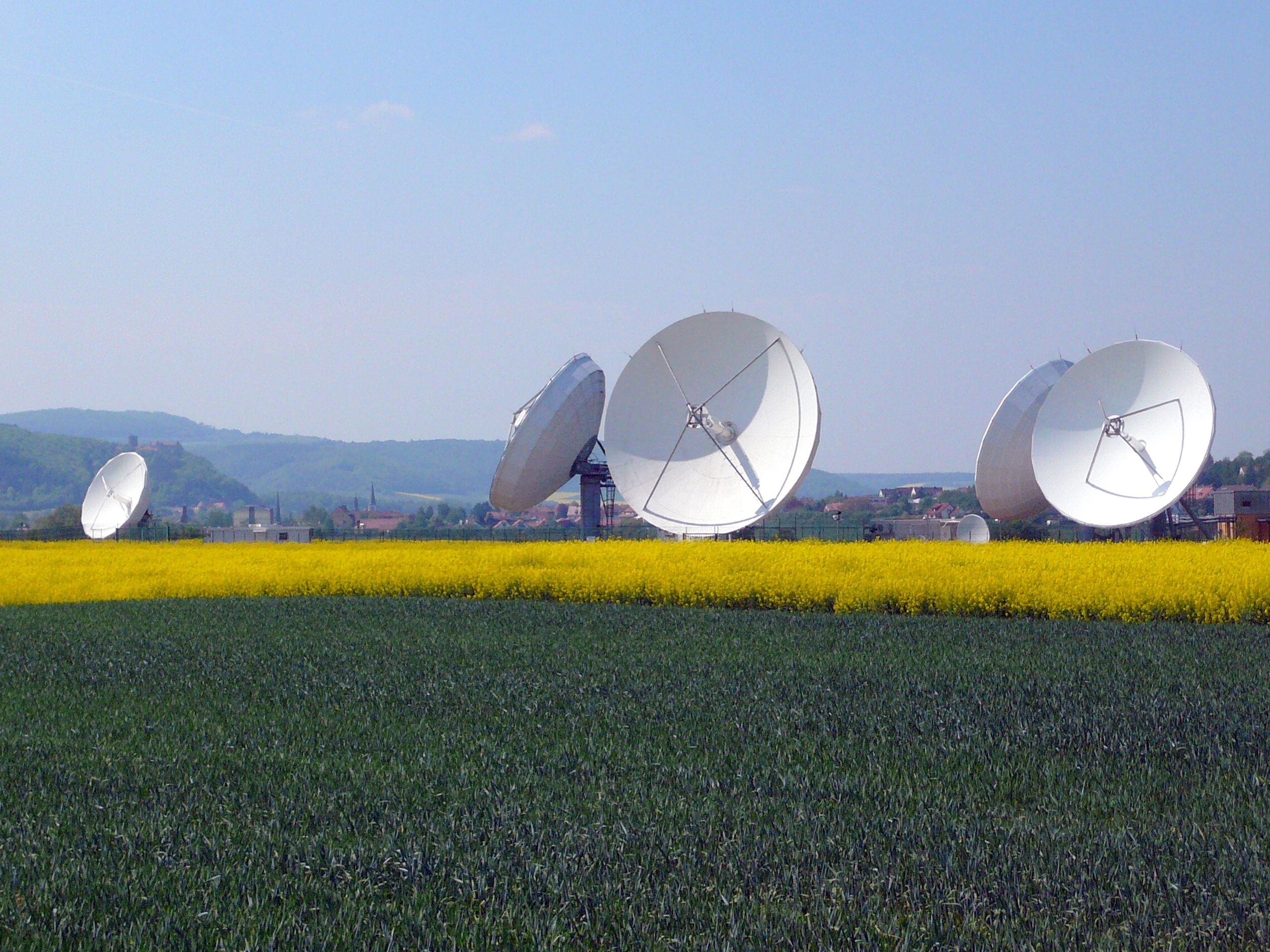
Antenna array four with five antennas ranging from 9.3 to 16.4 metres in diameter

As early as the summer of 1983, after completion of the planning approval and licensing procedures, the access road and cable ducts between the operations building and the antenna sites were completed. In October 1983, construction began on the operations building, which was designed to accommodate the planned final expansion of the earth station with five antennas. Siemens was the general contractor for the construction. MAN was contracted as a subcontractor for the steel construction, while ANT was subcontracted for the reception equipment and the construction of the antenna systems. In April 1984, the concrete base for antenna one was constructed, and on 24 May 1984, the topping-out ceremony was celebrated. A telecommunications tower was built two kilometres northeast of the earth station. At the end of October 1984, the reflector of antenna one, with a diameter of 32 metres and weighing around 100 tonnes, was mounted on the turntable. It had been assembled on-site on the ground and lifted onto the antenna base using a special crane. The total height is 42 metres. Construction of antenna two began in the same year. On 1 July 1985, antenna one was put into operation after the telecommunications equipment had been calibrated. Antenna two followed in autumn 1985. Both antennas are largely identical to the two antennas erected in Raisting in 1981, both in terms of their external appearance and their essential technical features.

The cost of the first two antennas and the communications equipment amounted to 78 million German marks. A further 30 million marks were raised for the construction of the operating buildings. The total cost at that time was around 120 million marks. Initially, five Class A parabolic antennas, each with a diameter of 32 metres, were planned to be erected gradually. Due to ongoing technical developments, antennas three and four were built smaller with improved signal quality. The closure by Deutsche Telekom in the 1990s meant that the fifth antenna was never built.

=== Operation ===
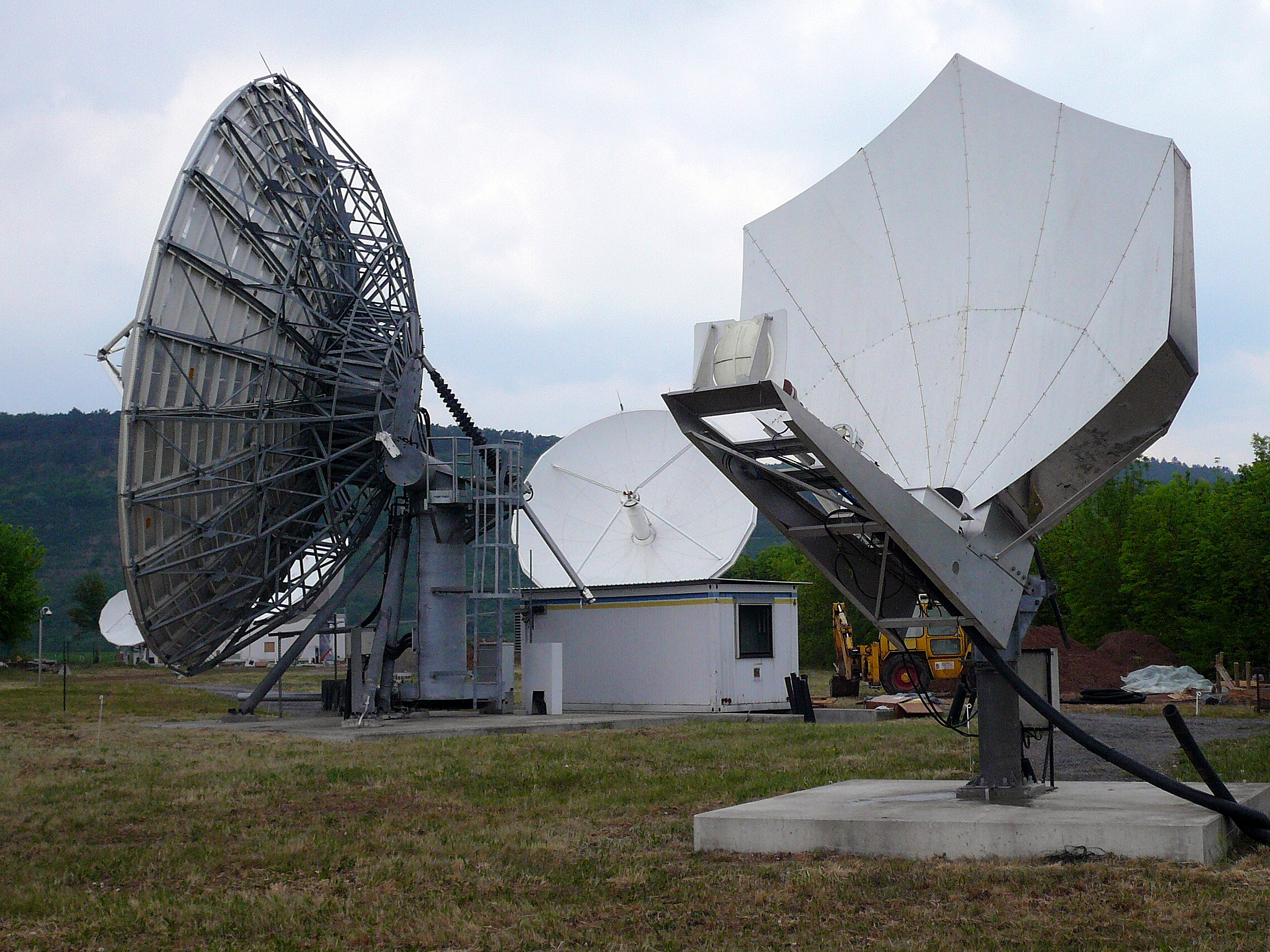
11-metre antenna (left) with shelter box (centre) in antenna field one

On 26 July 1985, Antenna One made its first transmission via satellite using the Ceduna ground station in Australia. Antenna Two went into operation on 11 November 1985. On 19 January 1991, Deutsche Telekom decided to close the Fuchsstadt ground station due to alleged overcapacity in the field of satellite radio. Despite this decision, antenna three was put into operation on 18 June 1991 and antenna four on 7 June 1994, each with a mirror diameter of 18 metres. Further smaller antennas followed.

In addition to daily operations, there were several events in which the facility played an important role. The USA used it for communications during the Gulf War in 1991/1992. This was followed by satellite broadcasts of the 1998 FIFA World Cup in France, the Australian Open tennis tournament, and the 1998 Olympic Games in Nagano.

=== Decommissioning ===
In 2000, the Fuchsstadt earth station, which had employed more than 40 people, was closed by Telekom. This was preceded by cooperation between Telekom and France Télécom, whereby both companies agreed to shut down one of their earth stations. France Télécom decided to close the station in Pleumeur-Bodou and keep Bercenay-en-Othe. Telekom's decision on whether to close Raisting or Fuchsstadt ultimately fell on Fuchsstadt, as the branch manager at the time, Walter Ral, had strongly advocated for Raisting. After its formal closure, Fuchsstadt was still used in 2000 for broadcasts from the Summer Olympics in Sydney.

=== Acquisition by Intelsat ===
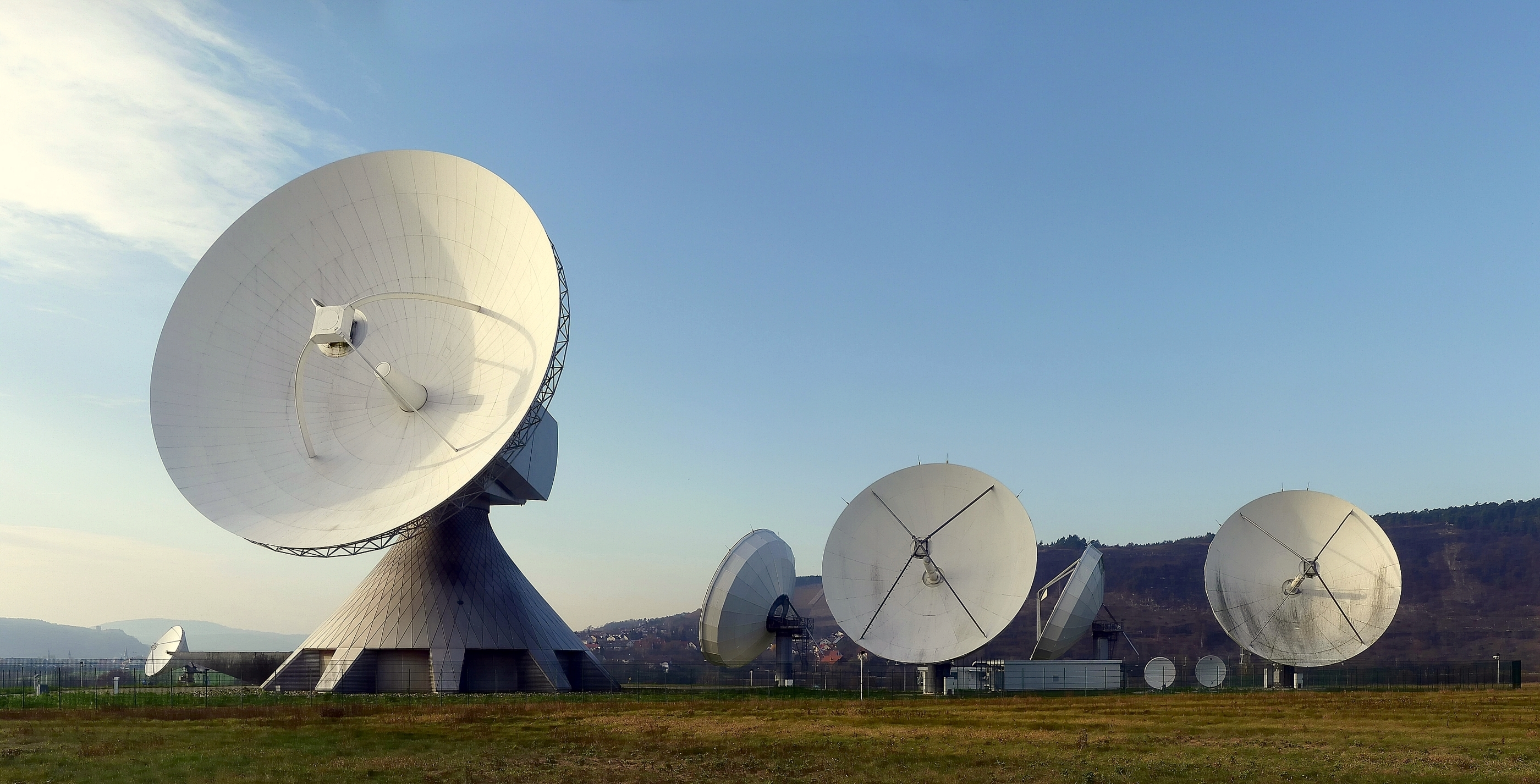
Antenna field two: on the left, the 32-metre antenna; to its left, an 8-metre antenna; and on the right, the four 16.4-metre antennas.

The second active phase of the Earth Station began on 1 April 2002 with its takeover by Intelsat, the second largest commercial satellite operator, which operates more than 50 satellites. The facility was officially handed over to its new owners on 3 June 2002 in a ceremony attended by the CEO of Intelsat. Intelsat initially employed around ten people at the earth station. There are now more than 30 employees, and the number is rising, about half of whom previously worked for Telekom at the earth station. On 20 March 2002, the Bad Kissingen district administration approved the construction of two new antennas on antenna field four.

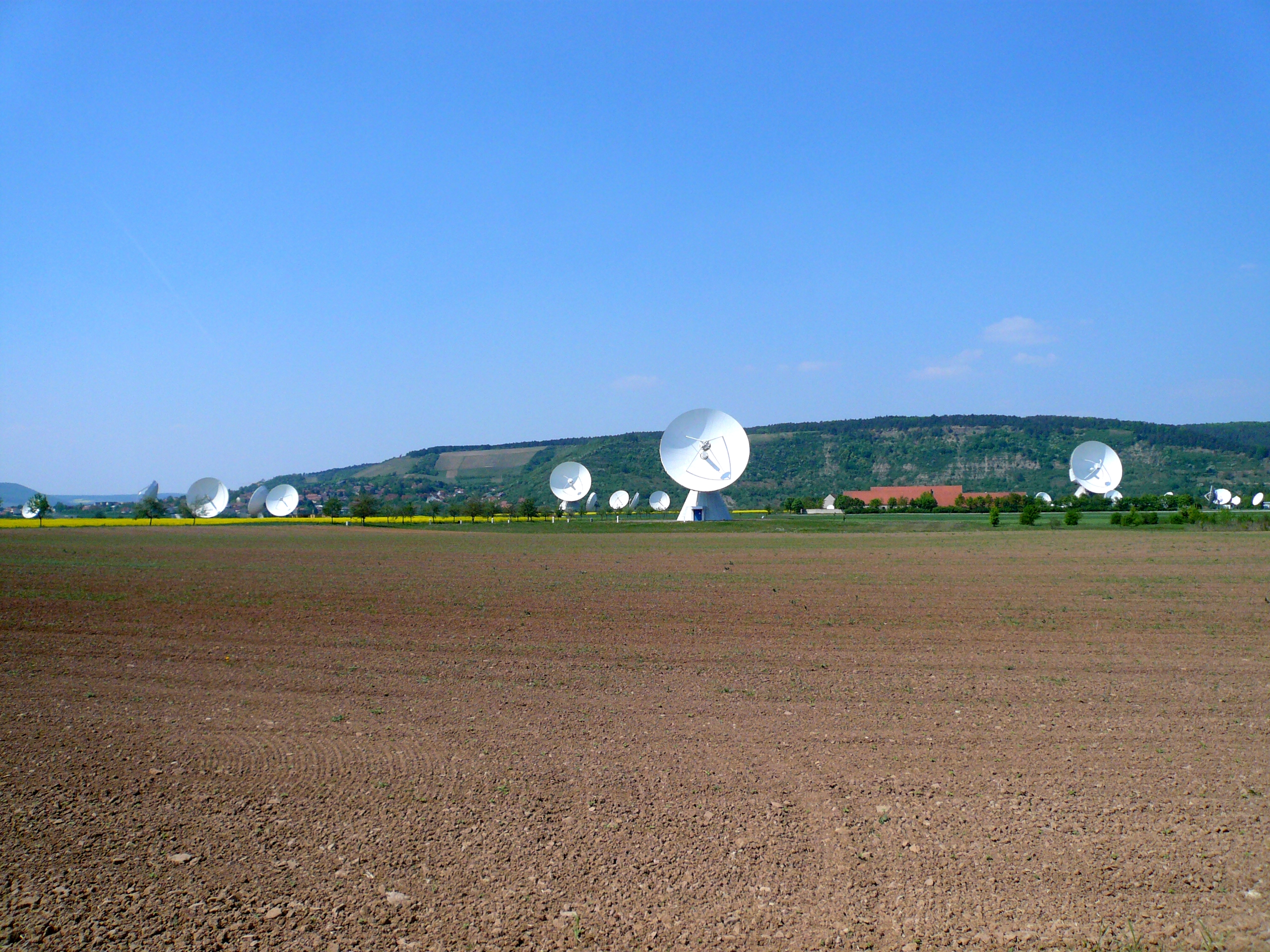
All antenna fields

During the first few weeks, Intelsat installed new technical components. Access to the terrestrial cable network was also improved. In spring 2002, construction began on two 13-metre antennas, which went into operation in June. From the outset, Intelsat's plans were aimed at expanding the earth station to provide more capacity for its customers. Initially, Intelsat received approval to expand the earth station to 15 antennas. In subsequent years, further antennas were approved. As a result, influenced by the growing demand for satellite communications, the earth station was expanded to over 40 antennas by 2009. The new antennas have a diameter of 4.3 to 16.4 metres, but smaller ones with a diameter of up to four metres were also built. Building permits have already been granted for three additional antennas, which can be erected as needed. In July 2009, approval was granted for the construction of seven additional antennas, four measuring 16.4 metres and three measuring 9.3 metres, meaning that the number of antennas over nine metres in height will rise to over 30 after completion.

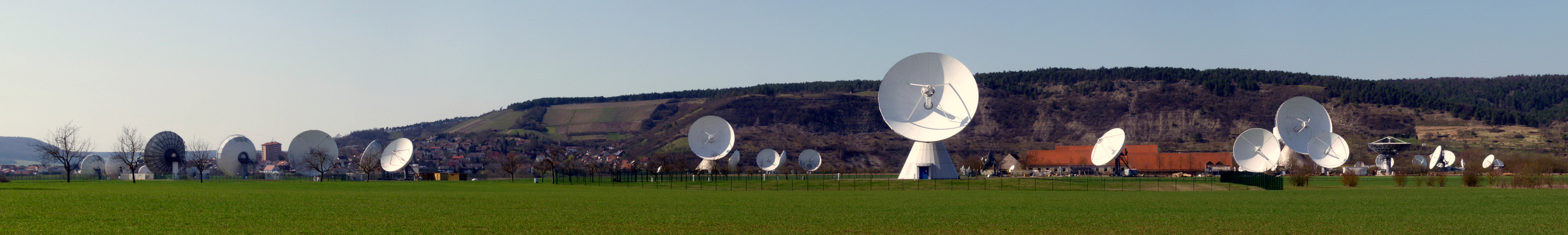
Overview

The earth station continued to operate even after Intelsat was taken over by four private equity firms in August 2004. In November 2004, a monitoring and control system for Intelsat satellites that had previously been installed in Raisting was installed. Antenna fields one, two, and four were fenced off and placed under video surveillance. The air conditioning systems for dissipating the heat generated were increased from 14 to 150, and three additional diesel generators were installed for emergency power supply. Under Intelsat and its successors, there have been and continue to be sporting highlights such as broadcasts of the NBA, NASCAR car racing, and Formula 1. Intelsat invested a total of tens of millions in the earth station.

== System structure ==
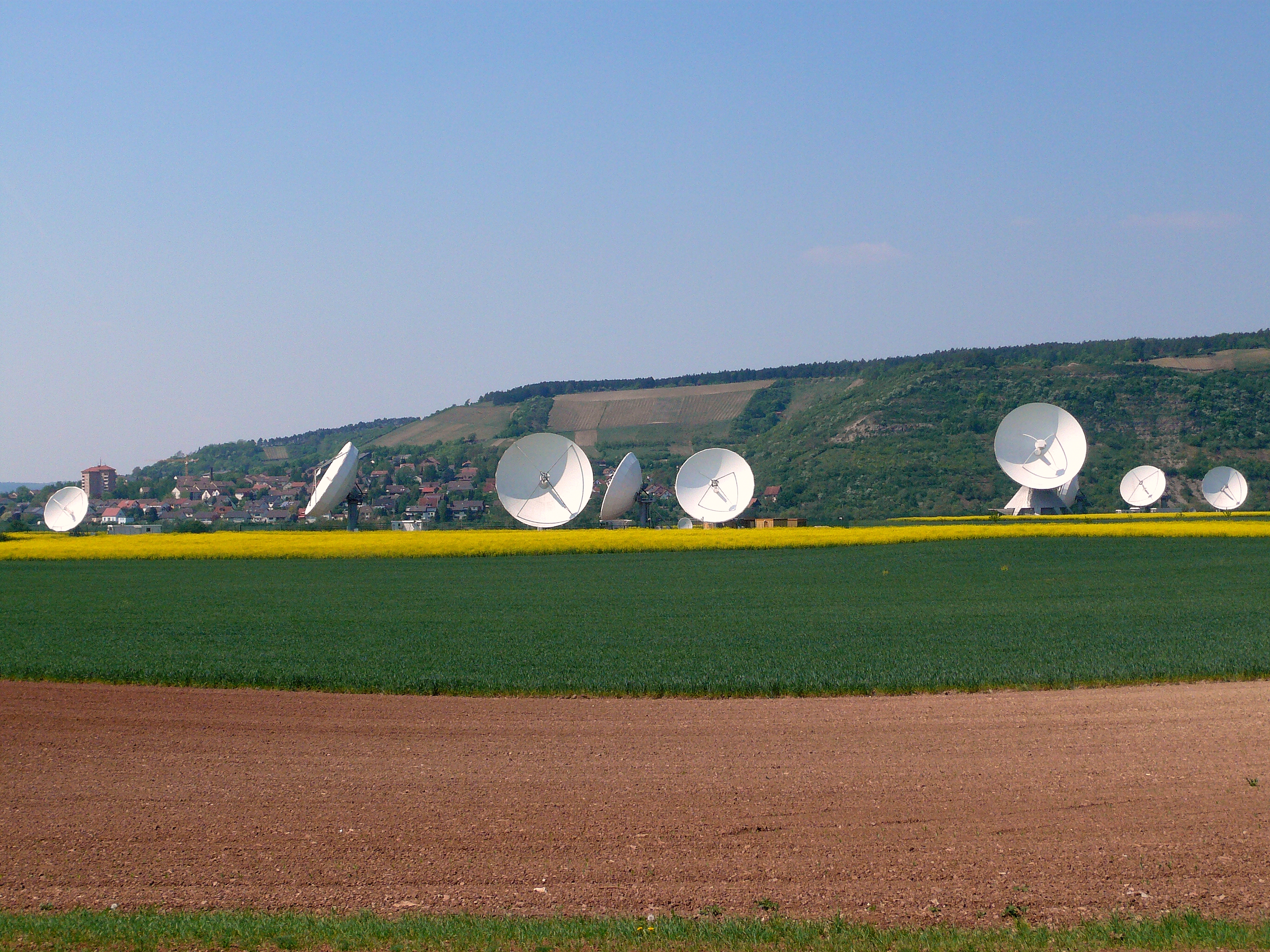
Antenna fields two and four

The entire facility is divided into several areas. It consists of the operations building, four antenna fields with more than 40 fully movable parabolic antennas, and the transmission mast. Currently, 23 large parabolic antennas are used to transmit and receive signals to and from space. Twenty of these were built by Intelsat in recent years, mostly in uniform sizes (9.3, 13, and 16.4 metres in diameter). Two of the three older antennas have a diameter of 32 metres, and the third has a diameter of 18 metres. Additional antennas ranging from 4.2 to 6.3 metres in diameter are also used to transmit and receive signals. Other smaller parabolic antennas, measuring up to four metres, can only be used to receive signals, most of which originate from Intelsat.

The antennas, which are over ten metres in diameter, are mainly used in the frequency range of the C band, while the smaller ones, including the 9.3-metre antennas, are used in the Ku band range to communicate with Intelsat's geostationary satellites. These satellites are located at an altitude of approximately 36,000 kilometres and serve Europe, North and South America, Africa, and large parts of Asia.

=== Company premises ===
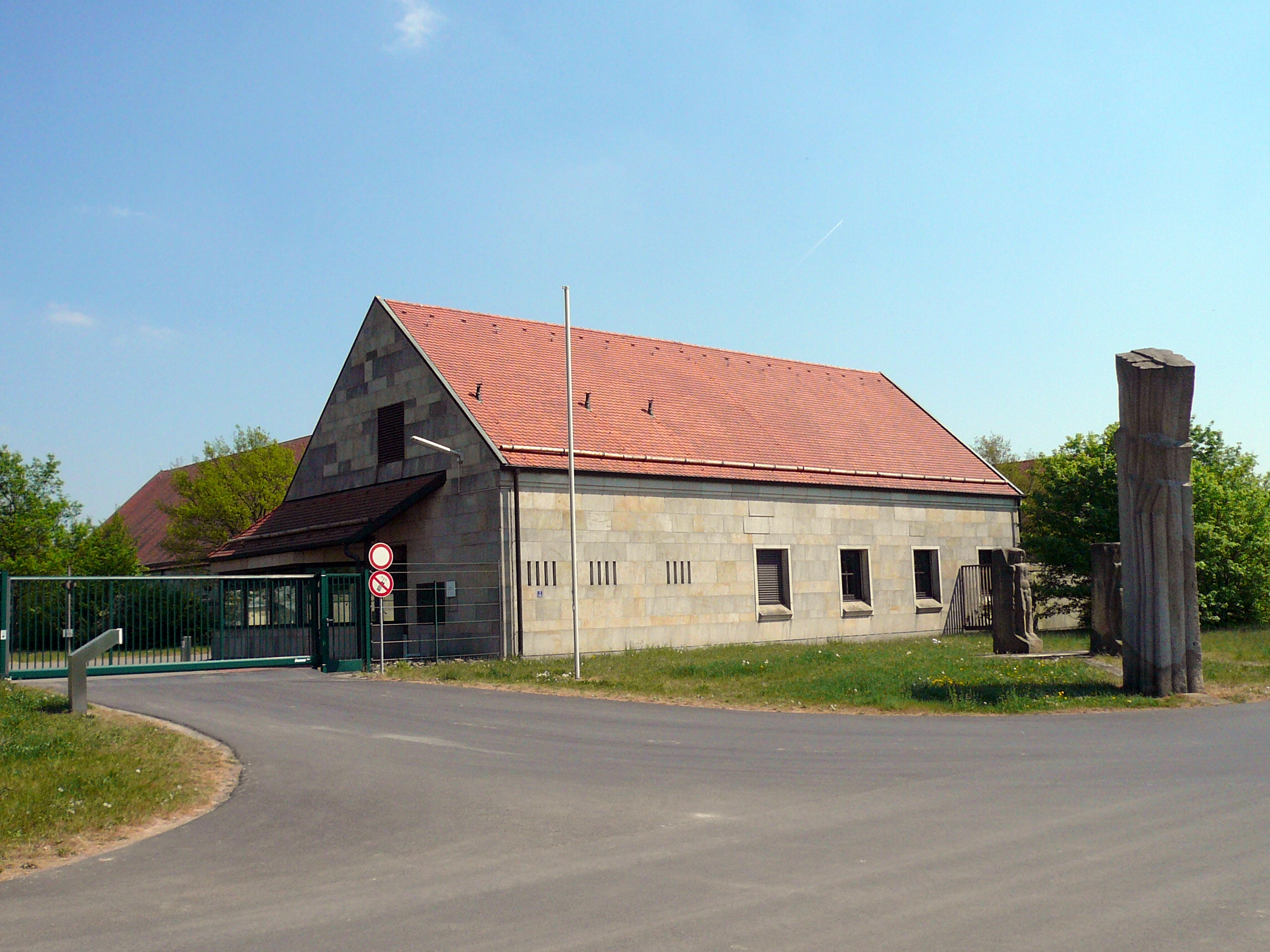
Company buildings at the main entrance

The company premises consist of several interconnected buildings in which more than 30 people are employed. The premises consist of six buildings, each designed for a specific function, and cover an operating area of approximately 7,000 square metres. This includes the central control room, from which all important functions are monitored and remotely controlled. The monitoring and control system for Intelsat satellites is housed in a specially secured part of the building.

The façade of the building was constructed from natural stone and fitted with tiled gabled roofs. The operations building is connected to the antenna fields via cable duct systems.

=== Power supply ===
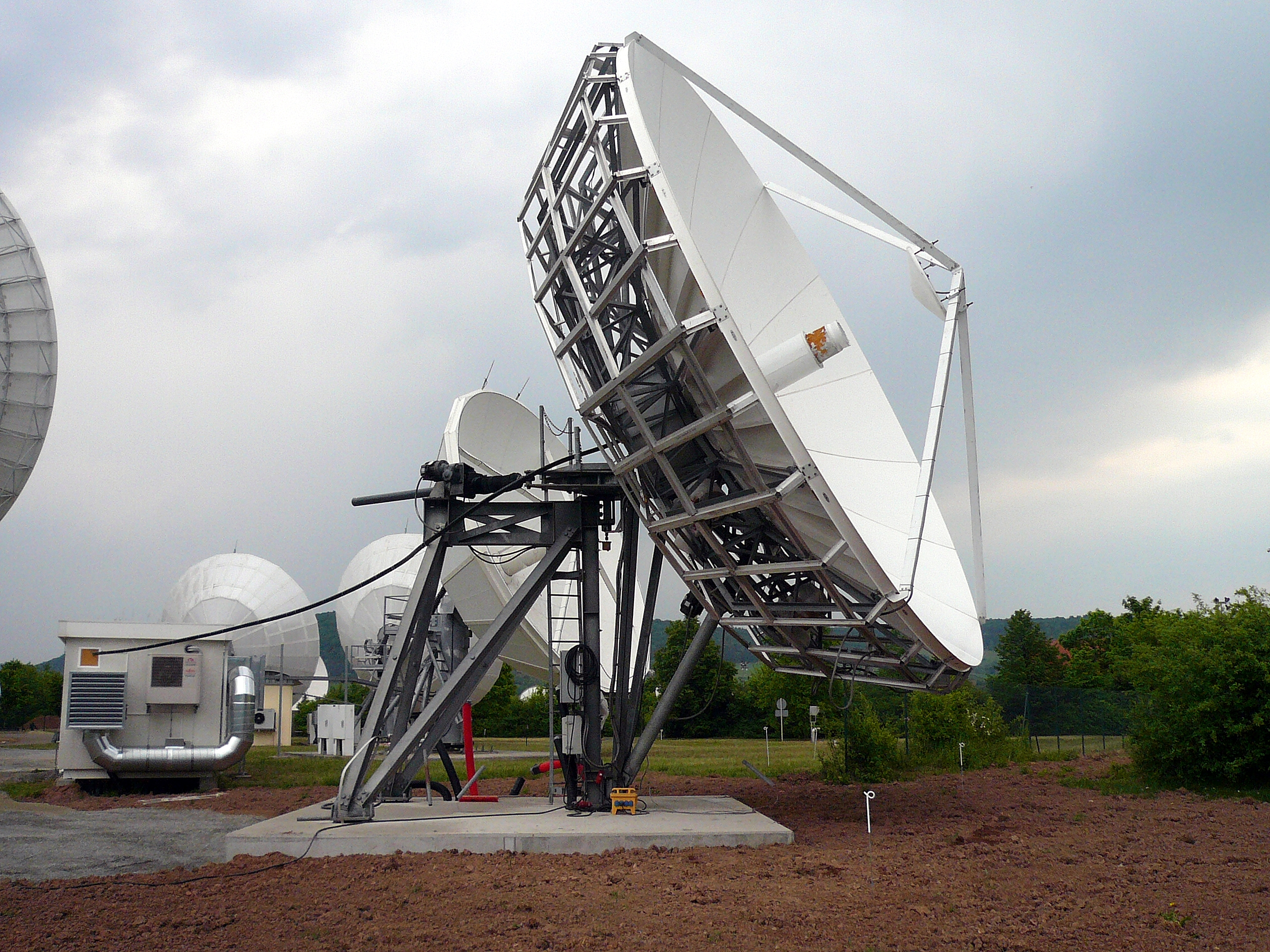
6.3-metre antenna on antenna field one

The earth station is supplied with power by two 20 kV lines from the Fuchsstadt substation. To maintain power supply to the entire earth station in the event of a power failure, the operations building houses four stationary diesel engines that can be switched separately to emergency power and uninterruptible power. Three of the four diesel generators with connected generators were installed by Intelsat. The generator, from the time the Earth station was built, delivers a slightly lower power output.

To prevent voltage fluctuations from the public power grid—such as during switchovers or thunderstorms—from affecting sensitive parts of the electrical systems, these are protected by a safety mechanism: the energy is buffered by a 2,900-kilogram flywheel that rotates at 3,300 revolutions per minute. This flywheel generates electrical power that is available to the sensitive electronic components of the earth station.

=== Antenna fields ===
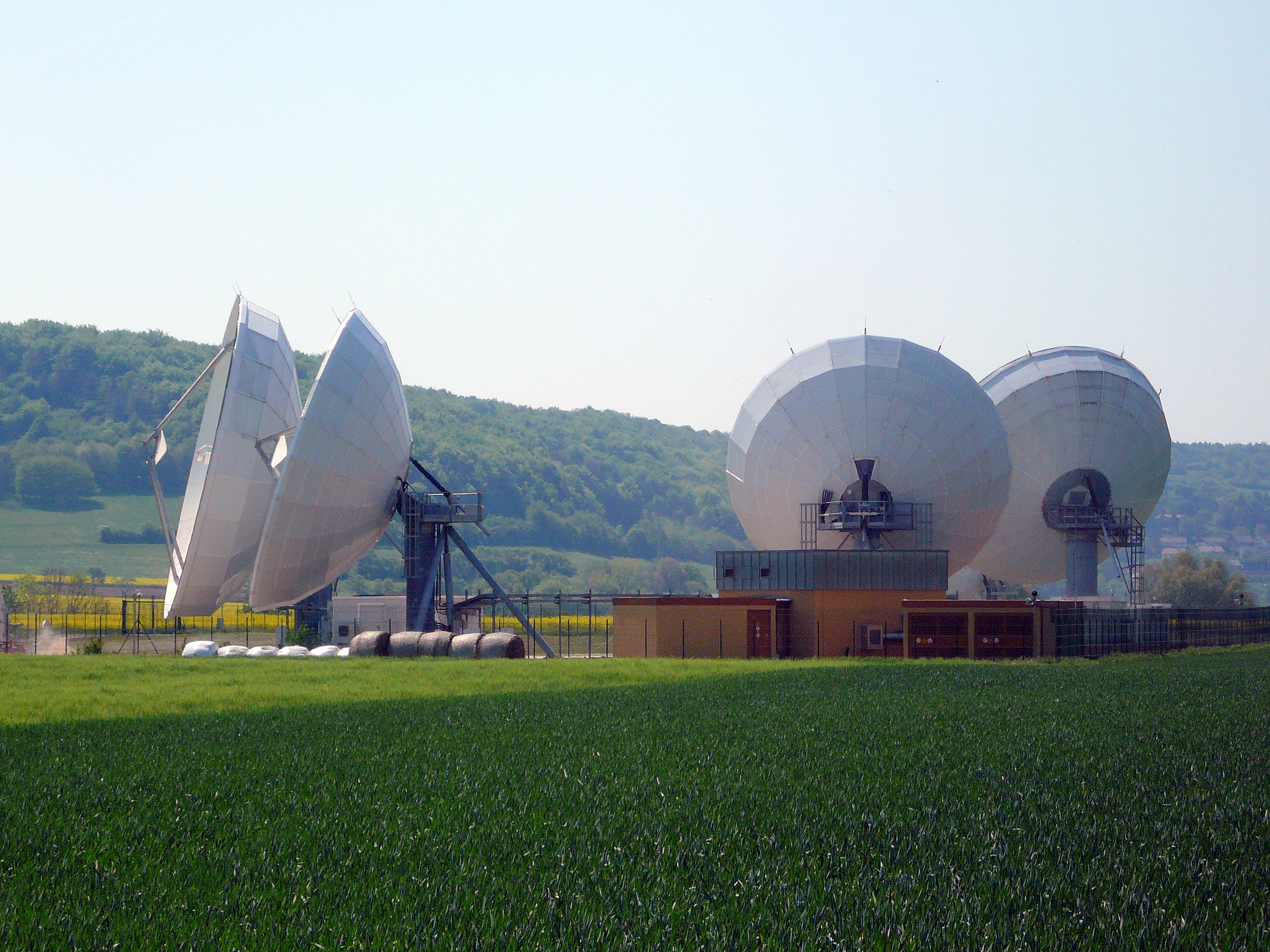
Antenna array four, two 16.4-metre and two 13-metre antennas

The earth station contains five antenna fields, four of which are equipped with antennas and are spaced approximately 500 metres apart. The operations building is located within the four antenna fields and is connected to antenna field one. The four antenna fields are fenced off and monitored by CCTV.

==== Antenna array 1 ====
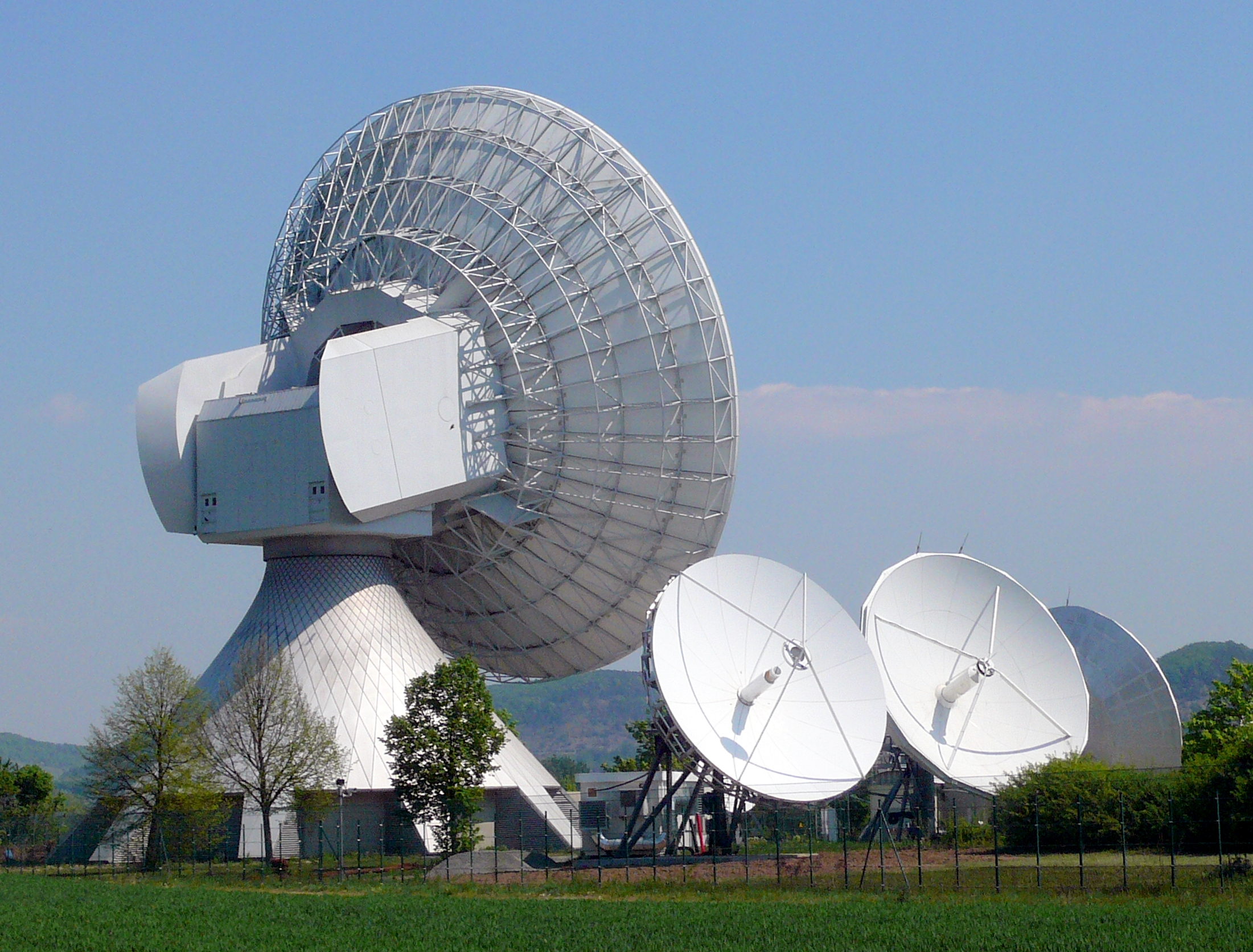
Antenna array one with 32-metre and 6.3 to 9.3-metre antennas

Antenna field 1 is the main area of the earth station. This is where the earth station's first antenna, dating from 1984 and measuring 32 metres in diameter, is located. The antenna consists of a main reflector and a secondary reflector, which are aligned with the satellite by an automatic tracking system. The antenna can withstand wind speeds of up to 180 kilometres per hour. Unlike the slightly older antennas in Raisting, the antenna is equipped with a new type of hyperbolically curved support for the auxiliary reflector, and the rear reflector cover is also missing. The antenna base has three levels. The central air conditioning system is located on the lowest operating floor. The other two floors house the equipment for controlling the antenna and the transmission technology. Another operating room in the steel structure of the antenna is equipped with its own air conditioning system.

==== Antenna array 2 ====
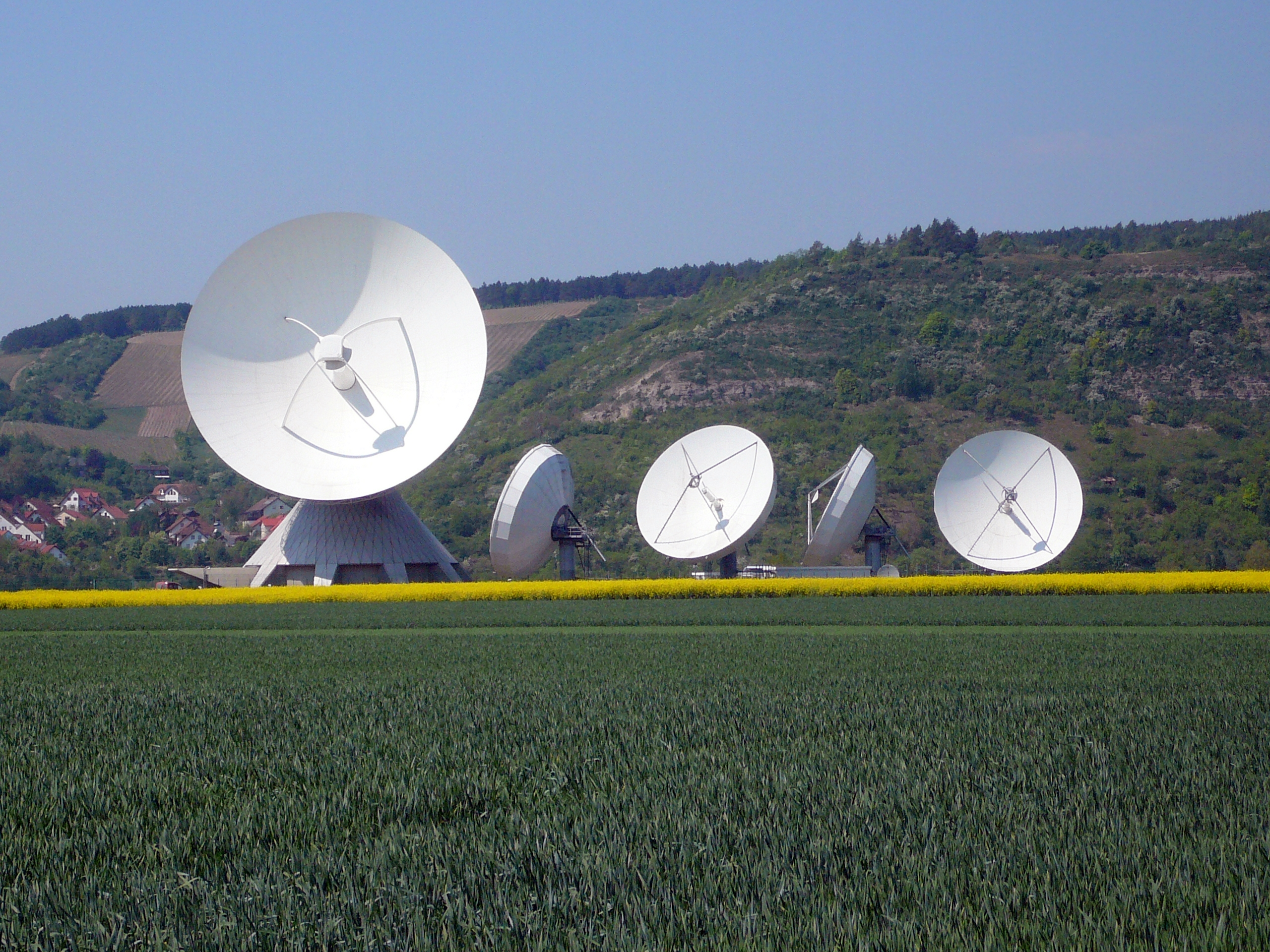
Antenna field two: a 32-metre antenna on the left and four 16.4-metre antennas on the right

There is a 32-metre antenna dating from 1985, four additional antennas, each with a diameter of 16.4 metres, an 8-metre antenna, and several smaller antennas. The 32-metre antenna is identical in construction to the antenna on field one. Like its counterpart in field one, the antenna was repainted in 2005. The four 16.4-metre antennas are controlled by two shelter boxes located within the field.

==== Antenna array 3 ====
This antenna array contains an antenna from 1991 with a diameter of 18 metres. Another antenna with a diameter of 13 metres is planned.

==== Antenna array 4 ====
There was an antenna with a diameter of 18.3 metres and a total weight of 23 tonnes. This was dismantled after decommissioning and taken to Raisting. Currently, there are three antennas with diameters of 16.4 metres, two with 13 metres, two with 9.3 metres, one with 8 metres, and other smaller antennas. Within the antenna field, there are several shelter boxes that are necessary for the operation of the antennas.

==== Antenna array 5 ====
Originally, five antenna fields, each with a 32-metre antenna, were planned. Due to the closure of the earth station, which had already been decided in 1991, Telekom did not build a fifth antenna. This antenna field was also taken over by Intelsat in 2002. No antennas are to be erected on this field in the future.

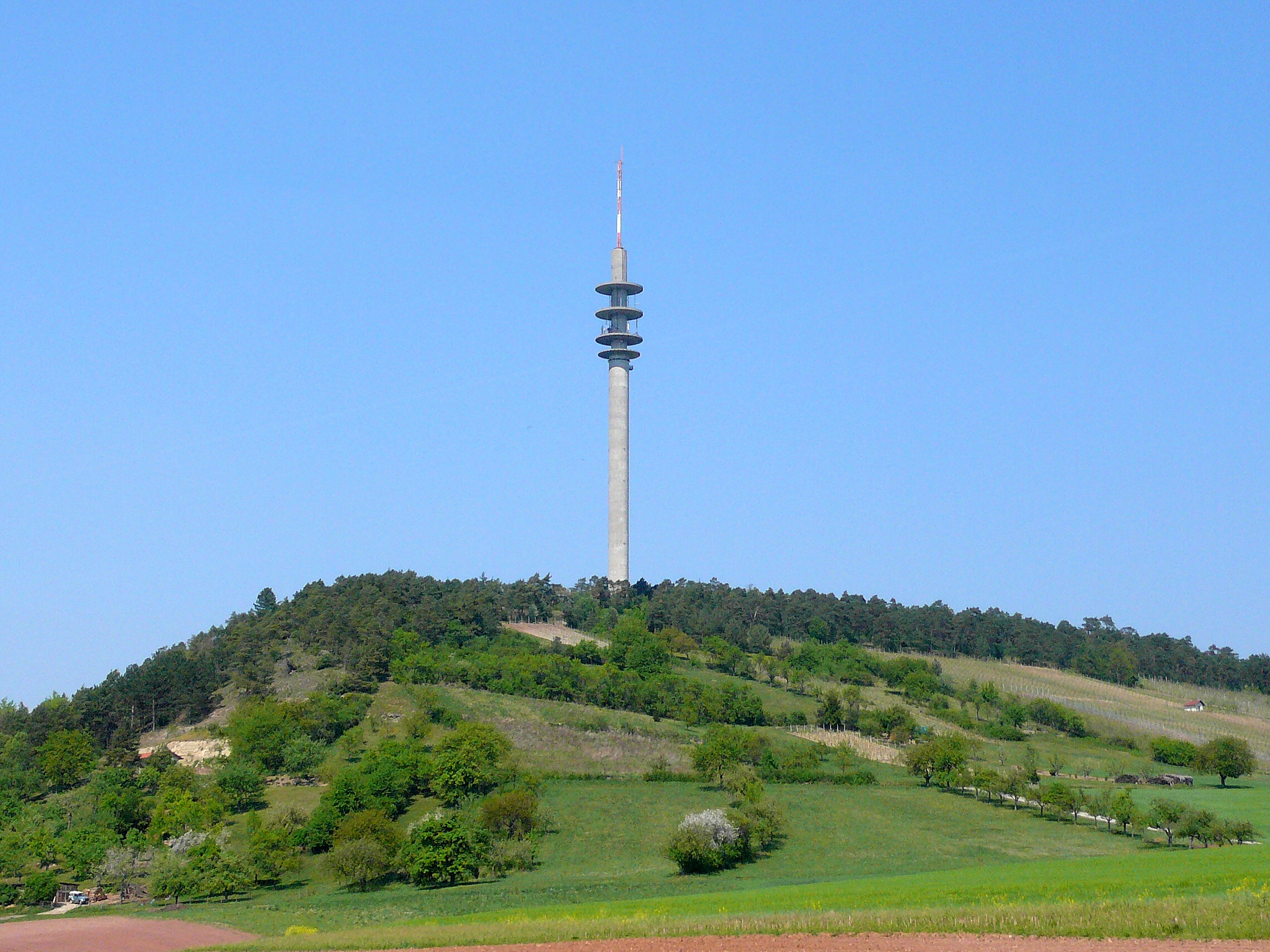
Transmission mast on the Längberg

==== Telecommunications tower ====
The tower is located two kilometres northeast of the earth station on the Längberg (310 metres above sea level). The tower is used to broadcast radio and television, but also to transmit radio-based telecommunications, such as telephone calls, from and to the earth station in the surrounding area. The height of the tower and the antenna on top of it is determined by the need to transmit and receive signals without interference over a large area.

The tower is a modified telecommunications tower (FMT) 16 with four platforms but no operating floor. The tower shaft itself is 111 metres high, and with the mast attached, the transmission mast has a total height of 137.5 metres. The platforms are located at heights of 79, 85, 92.5, and 100 metres. The lowest platform has a smaller diameter than the other three. There were several mirrors on the individual platforms, most of which were dismantled after the tower was decommissioned by Telekom.

== Current situation ==
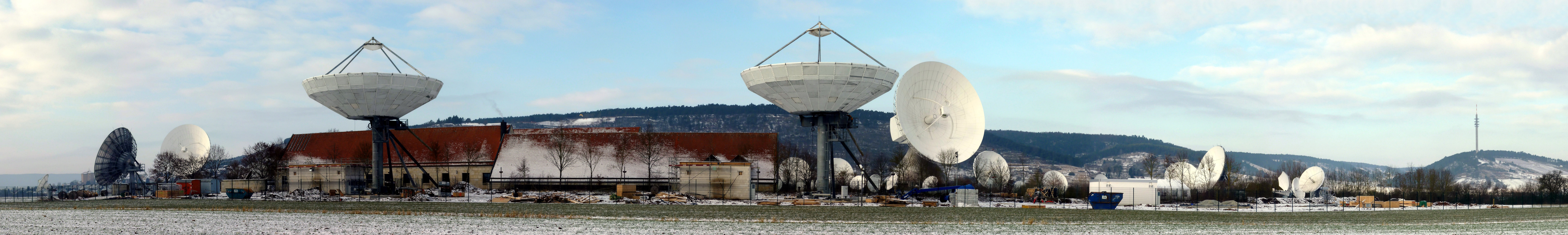
Antenna field 1 with operations building

Despite the takeover of Intelsat due to insolvency, the earth station is constantly being expanded. In 2007, three additional antennas with diameters ranging from 4.5 to 9.3 metres were erected in antenna field one. Another antenna is currently under construction. The foundation for this is complete and contains the cables and fixings for the future antenna. The expansion of the facility has often been criticised by the local population, as it now significantly exceeds the original final expansion planned in 2002, which was for 17 antennas.

=== Radiation ===
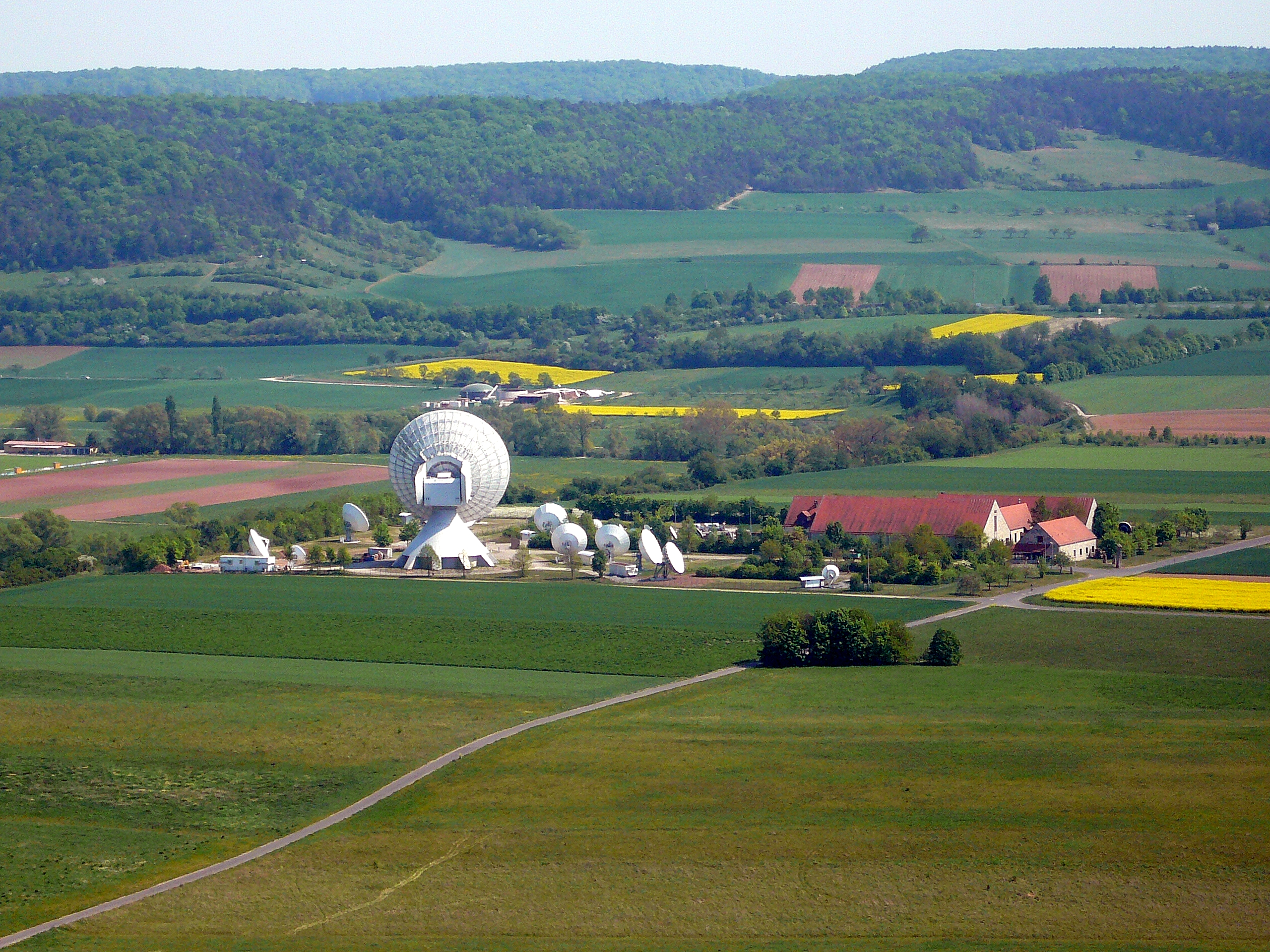
Antenna field one viewed from Ofentaler Berg

The Federal Network Agency issues a certificate for each antenna that is required for its use. In addition, separate location certificates are issued, specifying the boundaries of the individual antennas in terms of height above residential buildings and terrain. Prolonged exposure within these boundary areas can cause health problems due to radiation exposure. Very high energies occur at the centre of each antenna reflector.

Each antenna in Fuchsstadt has an elevation angle of at least eight degrees. This is to ensure sufficient elevation above the surrounding terrain and buildings. The specified safety distance in the main beam direction is 140 metres for antenna one, 245 metres for the second antenna, and 236 metres for the third antenna. For antennas four and five, which were the first to be erected under Intelsat—two 13-metre antennas on antenna field four—the safety distance is 1,425 metres. The large differences in safety distances depend on the different sizes of the antennas and the transmission powers used.

== See also ==
- List of geostationary satellites
