= Elfershausen =

- Municipality
- Coat of arms

- Location of Elfershausen within Bad Kissingen district
- Interactive map of Elfershausen
- Location within Germany Location within Bavaria
- Coordinates: 50°9′N 9°58′E
- Country: Germany
- State: Bavaria
- Admin. region: Unterfranken
- District: Bad Kissingen
- Municipal assoc.: Elfershausen

Government
  - Mayor (2020–26): Johannes Krumm

Area
  - Total: 34.9 km^{2} (13.5 sq mi)
- Elevation: 198 m (650 ft)

Population (2025-12-31)
  - Total: 2,832
  - Density: 81.1/km^{2} (210/sq mi)
- Time zone: UTC+01:00 (CET)
  - Summer (DST): UTC+02:00 (CEST)
- Postal codes: 97725
- Dialling codes: 09704
- Vehicle registration: KG
- Website: www.elfershausen.de

Elfershausen (German pronunciation: [ɛlfɐsˈhaʊzn̩]) is a municipality in the district of Bad Kissingen in Bavaria in Germany.

Elfershausen is a market town (Markt) or municipality that includes the following towns:

- Elfershausen;
- Engenthal;
- Langendorf;
- Machtilshausen;
- Trimberg.

== History ==
Adalfrideshusen is first documented in 800 in the records of the monastery at Fulda.

With secularization of the government in 1803, the territory of the present municipality became part of Bavaria. In the Treaty of Pressburg between France and Austria in 1805, the lands of the Bishop of Würzburg were given to Ferdinand III, Grand Duke of Tuscany, and he was made Grand Duke of Würzburg, a new state, as a reward for his support of Napoleon. These lands then again became part of Bavaria in 1814 (this time permanently) at the defeat of Napoleon.

In 1971, Trimberg, Engenthal, and Machtilshausen were added to the municipality, followed by Langendorf in 1978.

== Population ==
Year	Population
1970	2818
1987	2877
2000	3033

== Sightseeing ==
The Trimburg and the palace of Elfershausen are the most important architectural monuments.

== Economy ==
In 1998, there were 572 local businesses, of which 5 were in construction.

In 1999, there were 71 agricultural businesses in the municipality, with an area of 1430 hectares under cultivation, 1186 ha in fields and 229 ha in pasture.

== Transportation ==
Elfershausen-Trimberg is served by the Franconian Saaletalbahn, which runs modern diesel cars from the Erfurter Bahn (UnterfrankenShuttle). Every half-hour, there is a DBB train to and from Hammelburg.
