= Elfershausen (Verwaltungsgemeinschaft) =

- Verwaltungsgemeinschaft
- Location of Elfershausen within Bad Kissingen district
- Interactive map of Elfershausen
- Location within Germany Location within Bavaria
- Coordinates: 50°09′N 9°58′E
- Country: Germany
- State: Bavaria
- Admin. region: Lower Franconia
- District: Bad Kissingen
- Seat: Elfershausen
- Subdivisions: 2 municipalities

Area
  - Total: 53.2 km^{2} (20.5 sq mi)

Population (2025-12-31)
  - Total: 4,698
  - Density: 88.3/km^{2} (229/sq mi)
- Time zone: UTC+01:00 (CET)
  - Summer (DST): UTC+02:00 (CEST)

Elfershausen is a Verwaltungsgemeinschaft (municipal association) in the district of Bad Kissingen in Bavaria, Germany. Its seat is in Elfershausen.

It consists of the following municipalities:

1. Elfershausen
2. Fuchsstadt
