= Bad Brückenau (Verwaltungsgemeinschaft) =

- Verwaltungsgemeinschaft
- Location of Bad Brückenau within Bad Kissingen district
- Interactive map of Bad Brückenau
- Location within Germany Location within Bavaria
- Coordinates: 50°17′N 9°48′E
- Country: Germany
- State: Bavaria
- Admin. region: Lower Franconia
- District: Bad Kissingen
- Seat: Bad Brückenau
- Subdivisions: 4 municipalities

Area
  - Total: 86.24 km^{2} (33.30 sq mi)

Population (2025-12-31)
  - Total: 5,433
  - Density: 63.00/km^{2} (163.2/sq mi)
- Time zone: UTC+01:00 (CET)
  - Summer (DST): UTC+02:00 (CEST)
- Website: www.vgem-bad-brueckenau.de

Bad Brückenau is a Verwaltungsgemeinschaft (municipal association) in the district of Bad Kissingen in Bavaria, Germany. Its seat is in Bad Brückenau, itself not part of the Verwaltungsgemeinschaft.

It consists of the following municipalities:

1. Geroda
2. Oberleichtersbach
3. Riedenberg
4. Schondra
