= Euerdorf (Verwaltungsgemeinschaft) =

- Verwaltungsgemeinschaft
- Location of Euerdorf within Bad Kissingen district
- Interactive map of Euerdorf
- Location within Germany Location within Bavaria
- Coordinates: 50°09′N 10°02′E
- Country: Germany
- State: Bavaria
- Admin. region: Lower Franconia
- District: Bad Kissingen
- Seat: Euerdorf
- Subdivisions: 4 municipalities

Area
  - Total: 51.9 km^{2} (20.0 sq mi)

Population (2025-12-31)
  - Total: 4,299
  - Density: 82.8/km^{2} (215/sq mi)
- Time zone: UTC+01:00 (CET)
  - Summer (DST): UTC+02:00 (CEST)
- Website: www.vg-euerdorf.de

Euerdorf is a Verwaltungsgemeinschaft (municipal association) in the district of Bad Kissingen in Bavaria, Germany. Its seat is in Euerdorf.

It consists of the following municipalities:

1. Aura an der Saale
2. Euerdorf
3. Ramsthal
4. Sulzthal
