= Riedenberg =

- Municipality
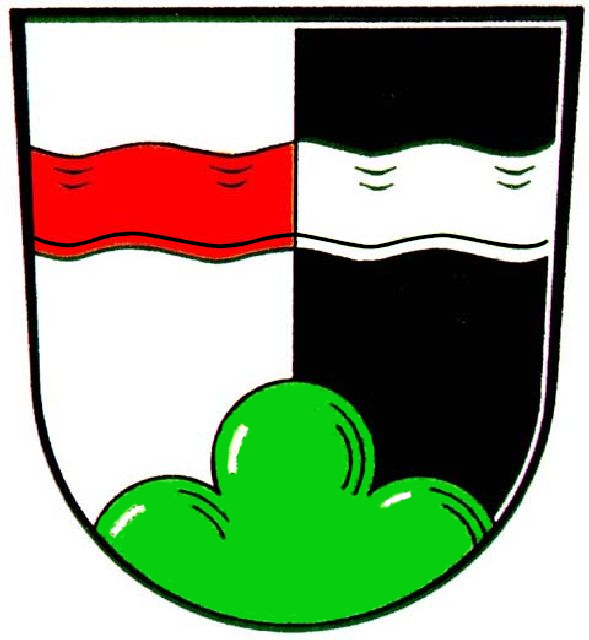
- Coat of arms

- Location of Riedenberg within Bad Kissingen district
- Interactive map of Riedenberg
- Location within Germany Location within Bavaria
- Coordinates: 50°19′N 09°51′E
- Country: Germany
- State: Bavaria
- Admin. region: Unterfranken
- District: Bad Kissingen
- Municipal assoc.: Bad Brückenau

Government
  - Mayor (2020–26): Roland Römmelt

Area
  - Total: 13.23 km^{2} (5.11 sq mi)
- Elevation: 395 m (1,296 ft)

Population (2025-12-31)
  - Total: 930
  - Density: 70/km^{2} (180/sq mi)
- Time zone: UTC+01:00 (CET)
  - Summer (DST): UTC+02:00 (CEST)
- Postal codes: 97792
- Dialling codes: 09749
- Vehicle registration: KG
- Website: vgem-bad-brueckenau.de

Riedenberg (German pronunciation: [ˈʁiːdn̩bɛʁk]) is a municipality in the district of Bad Kissingen in Bavaria in Germany.
