= Aura an der Saale =

- Municipality
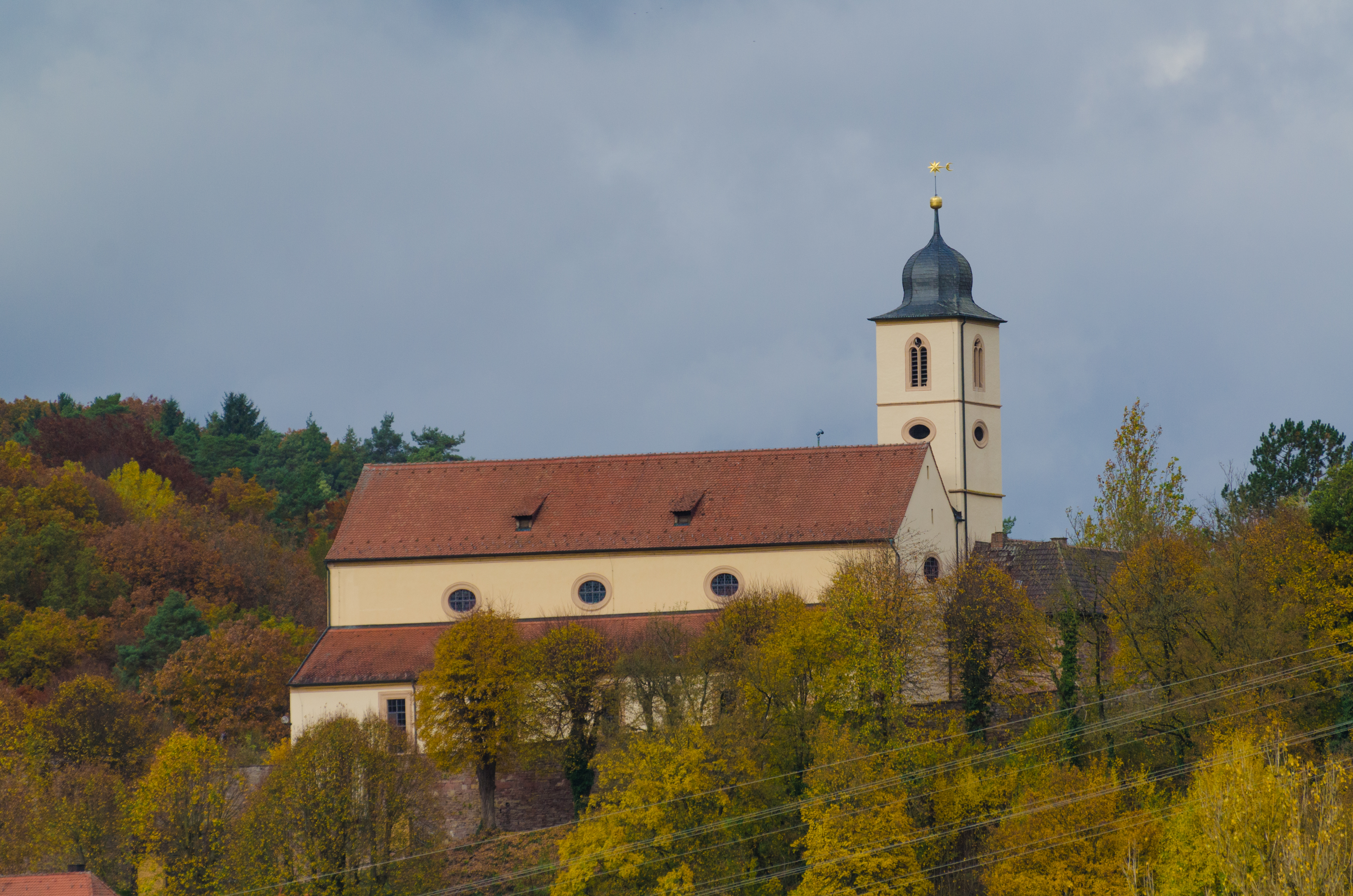
- Church of Saint Lawrence

- Coat of arms

- Location of Aura an der Saale within Bad Kissingen district
- Interactive map of Aura an der Saale
- Location within Germany Location within Bavaria
- Coordinates: 50°10′N 10°0′E
- Country: Germany
- State: Bavaria
- Admin. region: Unterfranken
- District: Bad Kissingen
- Municipal assoc.: Euerdorf

Government
  - Mayor (2020–26): Thomas Hack

Area
  - Total: 10.1 km^{2} (3.9 sq mi)
- Elevation: 232 m (761 ft)

Population (2025-12-31)
  - Total: 855
  - Density: 84.7/km^{2} (219/sq mi)
- Time zone: UTC+01:00 (CET)
  - Summer (DST): UTC+02:00 (CEST)
- Postal codes: 97717
- Dialling codes: 09704
- Vehicle registration: KG
- Website: www.aura-saale.de

Aura an der Saale (German pronunciation: [ˈaʊʁa ʔan deːɐ̯ ˈzaːlə], lit. 'Aura on the Saale') is a municipality in the district of Bad Kissingen in Bavaria in Germany.

== Geography ==
Aura lies on the left bank of the Franconian Saale in Franconia about 7 km from the district capital of Bad Kissingen. It is the smallest municipality in the district.

== History ==
A Benedictine monastery named Uragia was founded between 1108 and 1113 by Otto of Bamberg. Starting in 1394, the monastery belonged to the Bishop of Würzburg.

With secularization of the government in 1803, the territory of the present municipality became part of Bavaria. In the Treaty of Pressburg between France and Austria in 1805, the lands of the Bishop of Würzburg were given to Ferdinand III, Grand Duke of Tuscany, and he was made Grand Duke of Würzburg, a new state, as a reward for his support of Napoleon. These lands then again became part of Bavaria in 1814 (this time permanently) at the defeat of Napoleon.

In 1817, Aura was temporarily the seat of a state court of Bavaria. The present municipality was established in 1818.

In January 2003, Aura had a major flood, with many of the streets under water.

== Government ==
The town council has nine members, including the mayor. As of 2002, seven members were CSU and two DBB.

== Coat of arms ==
A red cross on a silver background, with a horizontal silver grill and a gold abbot's staff.

== Sightseeing ==
St. Laurentius church was built as the monastery chapel between 1108 and 1113.
