= Bad Kissingen (district) =

Coordinates: 50°15′N 10°00′E

- District
- Flag Coat of arms
- Country: Germany
- State: Bavaria
- Adm. region: Lower Franconia
- Capital: Bad Kissingen

Government
  - District admin.: Thomas Bold (CSU)

Area
  - Total: 1,137 km^{2} (439 sq mi)

Population (31 December 2025)
  - Total: 102,950
  - Density: 90.55/km^{2} (234.5/sq mi)
- Time zone: UTC+01:00 (CET)
  - Summer (DST): UTC+02:00 (CEST)
- Vehicle registration: KG, BRK, HAB
- Website: landkreis-badkissingen.de

Bad Kissingen is a Landkreis (district) in Bavaria, Germany. It is bounded by (from the northwest and clockwise) the district Main-Kinzig and Fulda in Hesse, and the districts of Rhön-Grabfeld, Schweinfurt and Main-Spessart.

== History ==
The district was established in 1972 by merging the former districts of Bad Kissingen, Bad Brückenau and Hammelburg.

== Geography ==
The district is located in the southern portion of the Rhön Mountains. The Fränkische Saale river (an affluent of the Main) enters the district in the north and leaves to the southwest.

== Coat of arms ==
The coat of arms displays:

- top: three icons symbolising the three spas of the district
- left: the eagle as well as the red and white pattern are from the arms of the county of Henneberg, which ruled the territory in the Middle Ages
- right: the cross from the arms of Fulda

== Towns and municipalities ==
Clickable map of towns and municipalities in the district

Towns
1. Bad Brückenau
2. Bad Kissingen
3. Hammelburg
4. Münnerstadt
Märkte
1. Bad Bocklet
2. Burkardroth
3. Oberthulba
4. Wildflecken
5. Zeitlofs
Municipalities
1. Motten
2. Nüdlingen
3. Oerlenbach
4. Riedenberg
5. Wartmannsroth

Verwaltungsgemeinschaften
1. Bad Brückenau; 1. Geroda^{2}; 2. Oberleichtersbach; 3. Riedenberg; 4. Schondra^{2}	2. Elfershausen; 1. Elfershausen^{1,2}; 2. Fuchsstadt	3. Euerdorf; 1. Aura an der Saale; 2. Euerdorf^{1,2}; 3. Ramsthal; 4. Sulzthal^{2}	4. Maßbach; 1. Maßbach^{1,2}; 2. Rannungen; 3. Thundorf
^{1}seat of the Verwaltungsgemeinschaft; ^{2}Markt

== See also ==
- Fuchsstadt Earth Station
