= Rannungen =

- Municipality
- Coat of arms

- Location of Rannungen within Bad Kissingen district
- Interactive map of Rannungen
- Location within Germany Location within Bavaria
- Coordinates: 50°9′N 10°13′E
- Country: Germany
- State: Bavaria
- Admin. region: Unterfranken
- District: Bad Kissingen
- Municipal assoc.: Maßbach

Government
  - Mayor (2020–26): Fridolin Zehner (CSU)

Area
  - Total: 17.34 km^{2} (6.70 sq mi)
- Elevation: 352 m (1,155 ft)

Population (2025-12-31)
  - Total: 1,086
  - Density: 62.63/km^{2} (162.2/sq mi)
- Time zone: UTC+01:00 (CET)
  - Summer (DST): UTC+02:00 (CEST)
- Postal codes: 97517
- Dialling codes: 09738
- Vehicle registration: KG
- Website: www.rannungen.de

Rannungen (German pronunciation: [ˈʁanʊŋən]) is a municipality in the district of Bad Kissingen in Bavaria in Germany.
