= Thundorf in Unterfranken =

Thundorf i.UFr.
- Municipality
- Coat of arms

- Location of Thundorf i.UFr. within Bad Kissingen district
- Interactive map of Thundorf i.UFr.
- Location within Germany Location within Bavaria
- Coordinates: 50°11′N 10°19′E
- Country: Germany
- State: Bavaria
- Admin. region: Unterfranken
- District: Bad Kissingen
- Municipal assoc.: Maßbach

Government
  - Mayor (2020–26): Judith Dekant

Area
  - Total: 15.57 km^{2} (6.01 sq mi)
- Elevation: 330 m (1,080 ft)

Population (2025-12-31)
  - Total: 988
  - Density: 63.5/km^{2} (164/sq mi)
- Time zone: UTC+01:00 (CET)
  - Summer (DST): UTC+02:00 (CEST)
- Postal codes: 97711
- Dialling codes: 09724
- Vehicle registration: KG
- Website: www.thundorf.de

Thundorf is a municipality in the district of Bad Kissingen in Bavaria in Germany.
