= Dreistelzberg =

Mountain in Bavaria, Germany

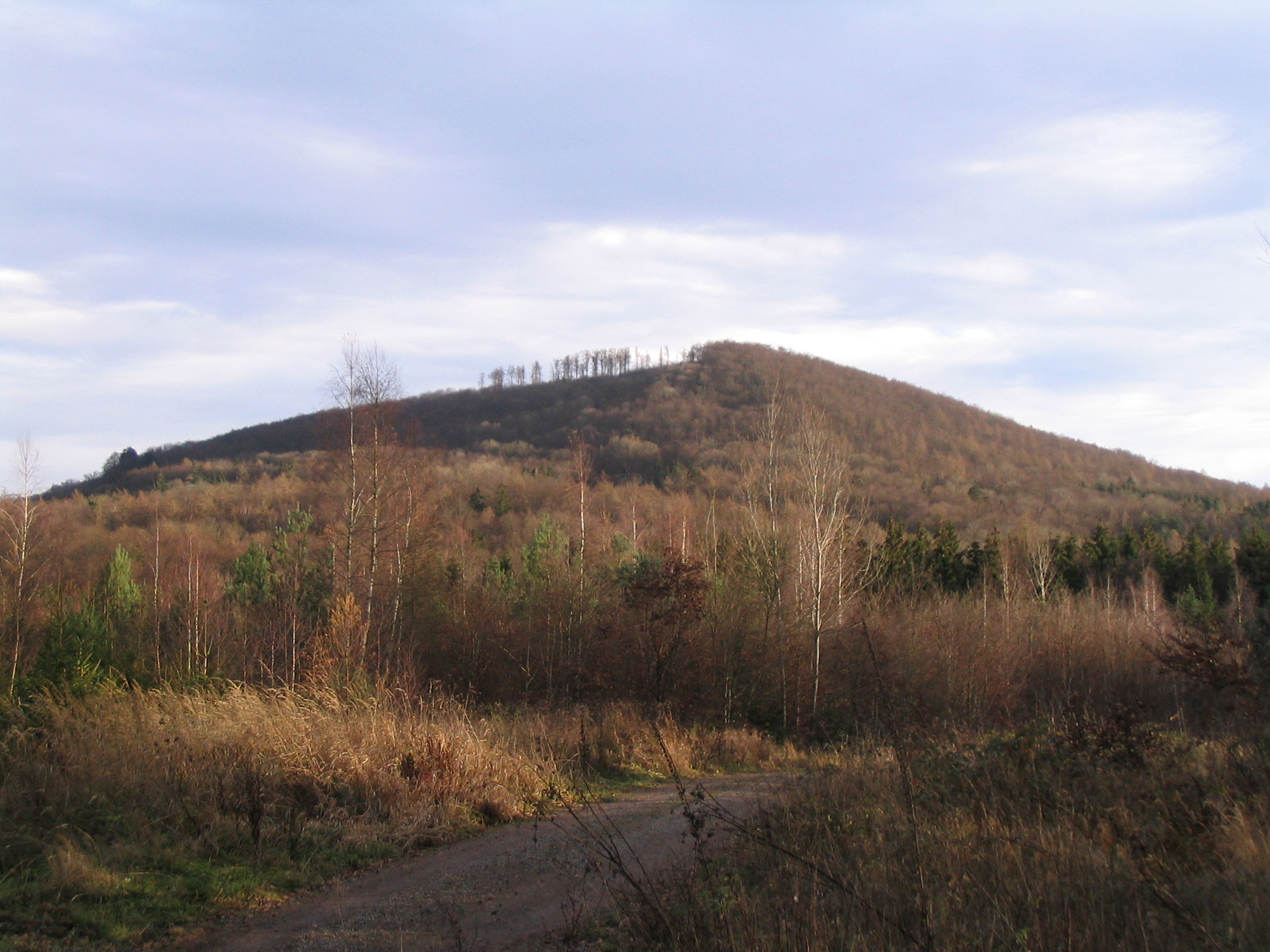
- View of the climb from Wernarz

Highest point
- Elevation: 660.4 m above sea level (NHN) (2,167 ft)
- Coordinates: 50°16′36″N 9°46′09″E

Geography
- Location within Bavaria
- Location: Bad Kissingen, Lower Franconia, Bavaria, Germany
- Parent range: Rhön

The Dreistelzberg, also called the Dreistelzkopf and frequently shortened to Dreistelz, is a mountain, 660.4 m above sea level (NHN), in the Bavarian part of the Rhön Mountains.

The mountain is not one of the highest Rhön peaks, but thanks to its rather isolated location on the southwestern edge of the range it has a striking appearance, rising prominently above its surroundings.

== Location ==
As the highest summit in the Brückenau Kuppenrhön the Dreistelzberg rises in the area where the range transitions to the Spessart mountains to the southwest, lying within the Rhön Biosphere Reserve and the Bavarian Rhön Nature Park. It is located in the county of Bad Kissingen around four kilometres south-southwest of the town of Bad Brückenau, immediately north-northwest of the village of Modlos and immediately west-southwest of the mountainside village of Dreistelz, both within the municipality of Oberleichtersbach.

== Observation tower ==
In the western part of the summit region of the Dreistelzberg, which is accessible on woodland paths, stands an observation tower, which is architecturally interesting and extremely open, but nevertheless made in a sturdy, steel design. The tower comprises five, roughly 3 metre high steel lattice cuboids with a square cross-section of 4 metres per side. On the top is a viewing platform with a diameter of 4.5 metres. In 2002, the tower was completely renovated. It was dismantled and the individual components transported to a steel workshop where they were cleaned and hot-dip galvanized. The tower was then rebuilt.

There is an almost complete all-round view from the top of the tower. On clear days there are views to the west as far as the Großer Feldberg in the Taunus. To the southwest can be seen the hills of the Spessart. To the south the views extend as far as the heights of the Steigerwald. To the east, views of the Kreuzberg and the Black Hills (both part of the Rhön) are blocked by trees, but to the northeast can be seen the Dammersfeldkuppe and the town of Bad Brückenau in the valley of the Sinn below. To the north there is a view of the Knüll, and to the northwest the Vogelsberg can clearly be seen behind the Landrücken.

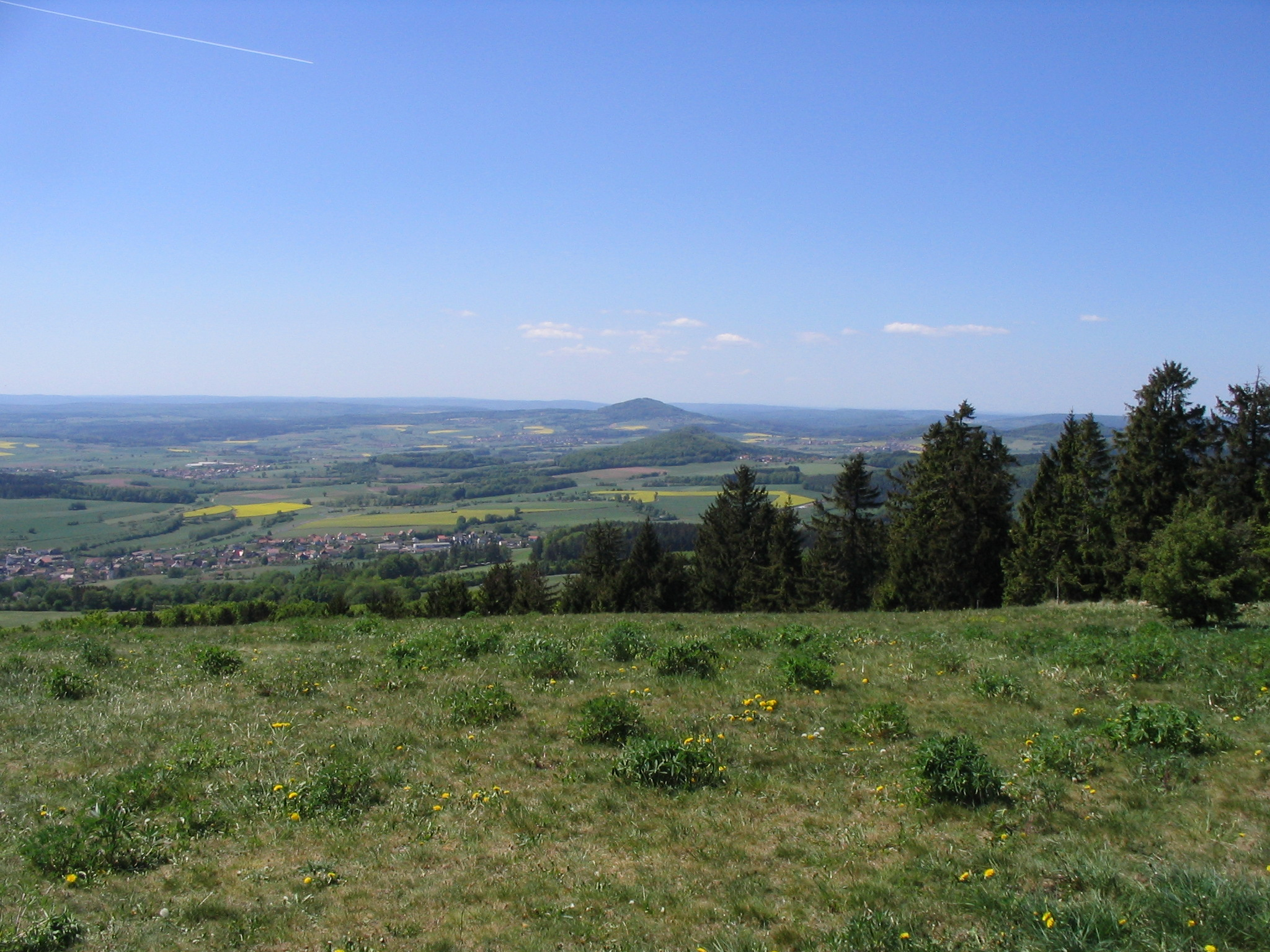
View from the east (Platzer Kuppe, 736.8 m above sea level (NHN))

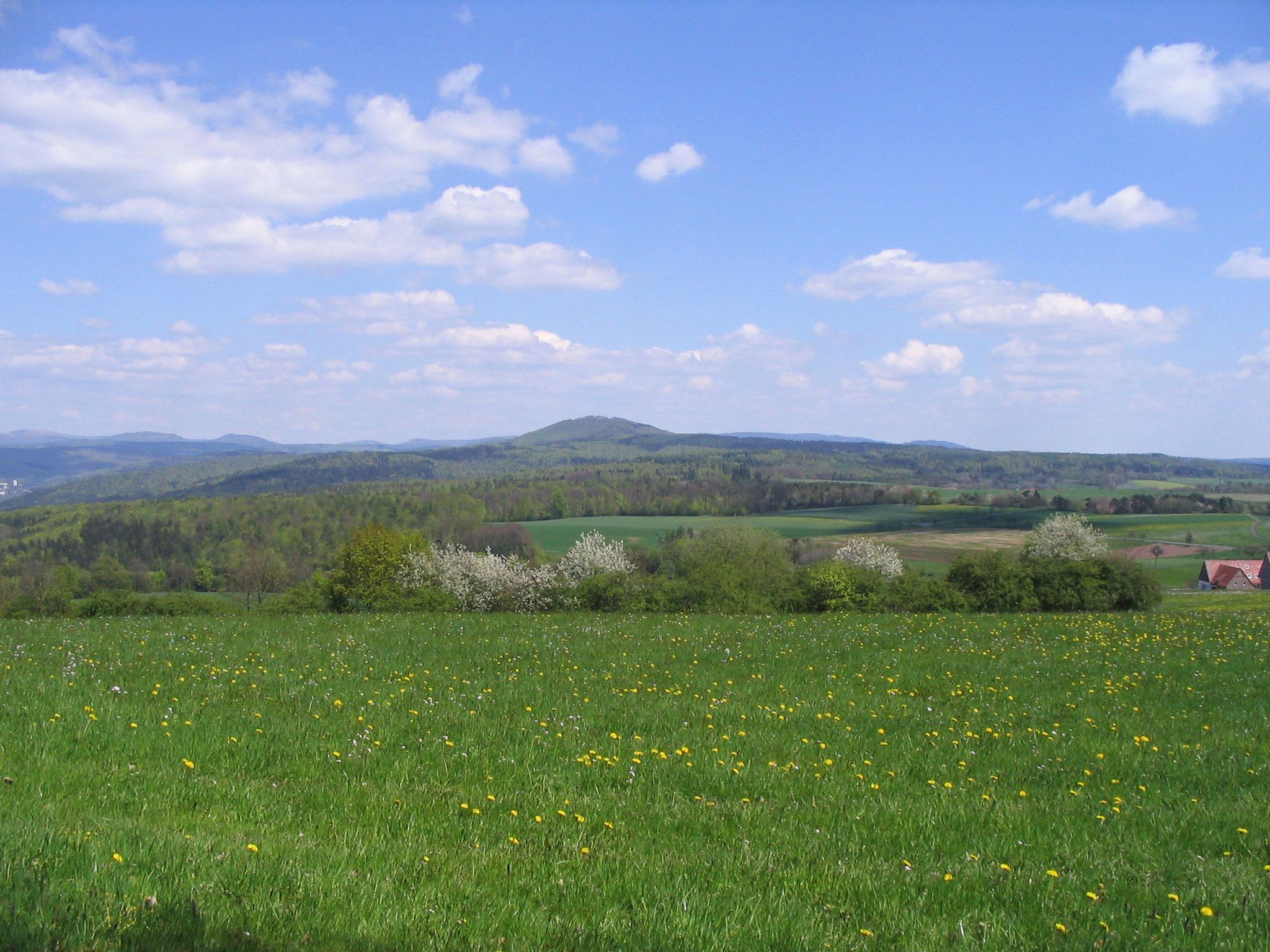
View of the mountain from the west near Roßbach

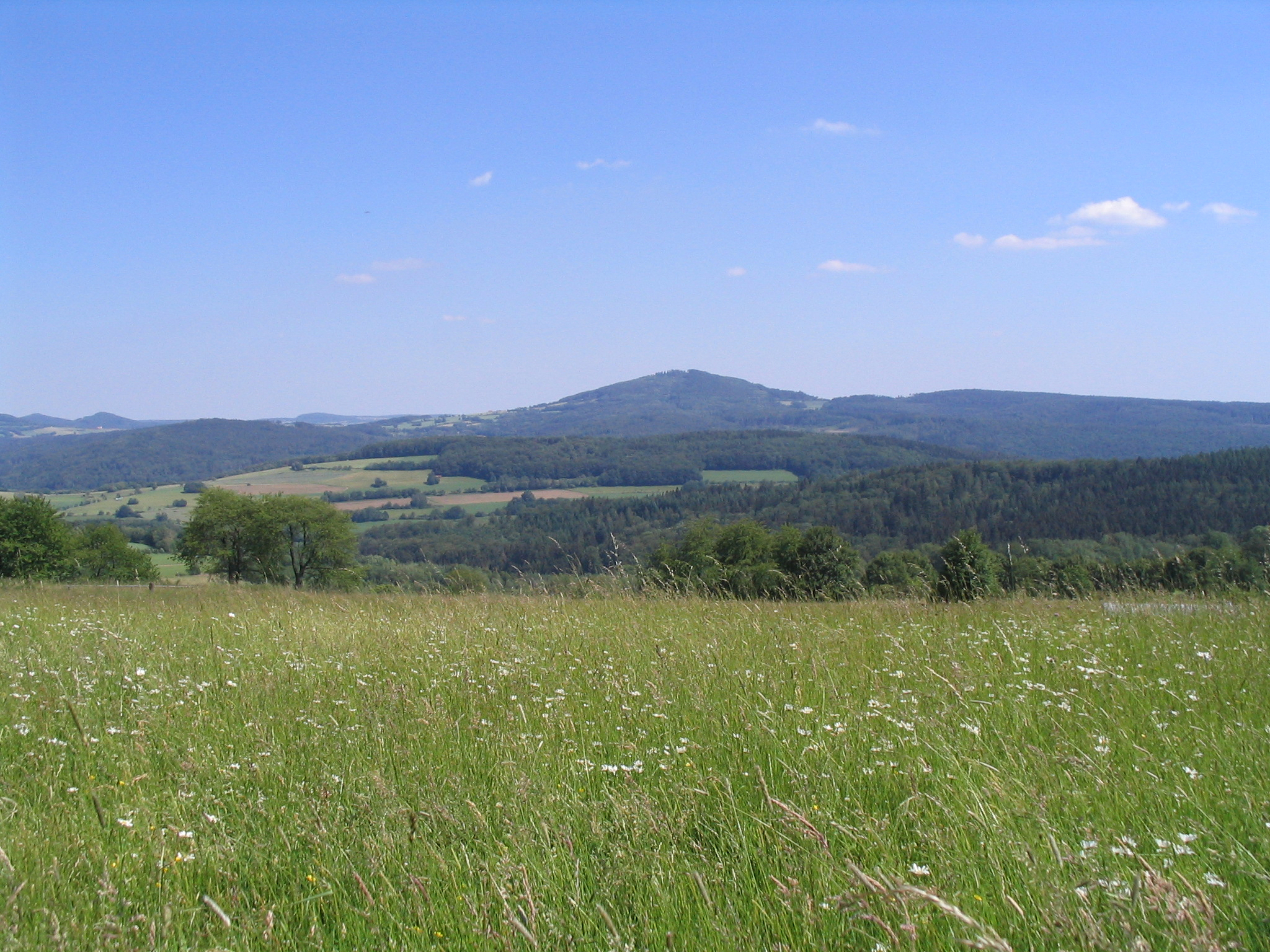
View of the Dreistelzberg from the southeastern side of the Stiftes

== Legend ==
According to legend the Dreistelz is named after three haughty young women (die drei Stolzen) whose castle was cursed by a pilgrim who visited them at night, but was turned away. The castle was swallowed up in the depths of the mountain.

== See also ==
- List of mountains and hills of the Rhön
