= Wohnroder Bach =

River in Germany

Location
- Country: Germany
- State: Bavaria

Physical characteristics
- Mouth
  - location: Fellach
  - coordinates: 50.1415°N 9.5664°E

Basin features
- Progression: Fellach→ Aura→ Sinn→ Franconian Saale→ Main→ Rhine→ North Sea

Wohnroder Bach is a river of Bavaria, Germany.

It springs in Wohnrod, a part of Fellen. It is a headstream of the Fellach.

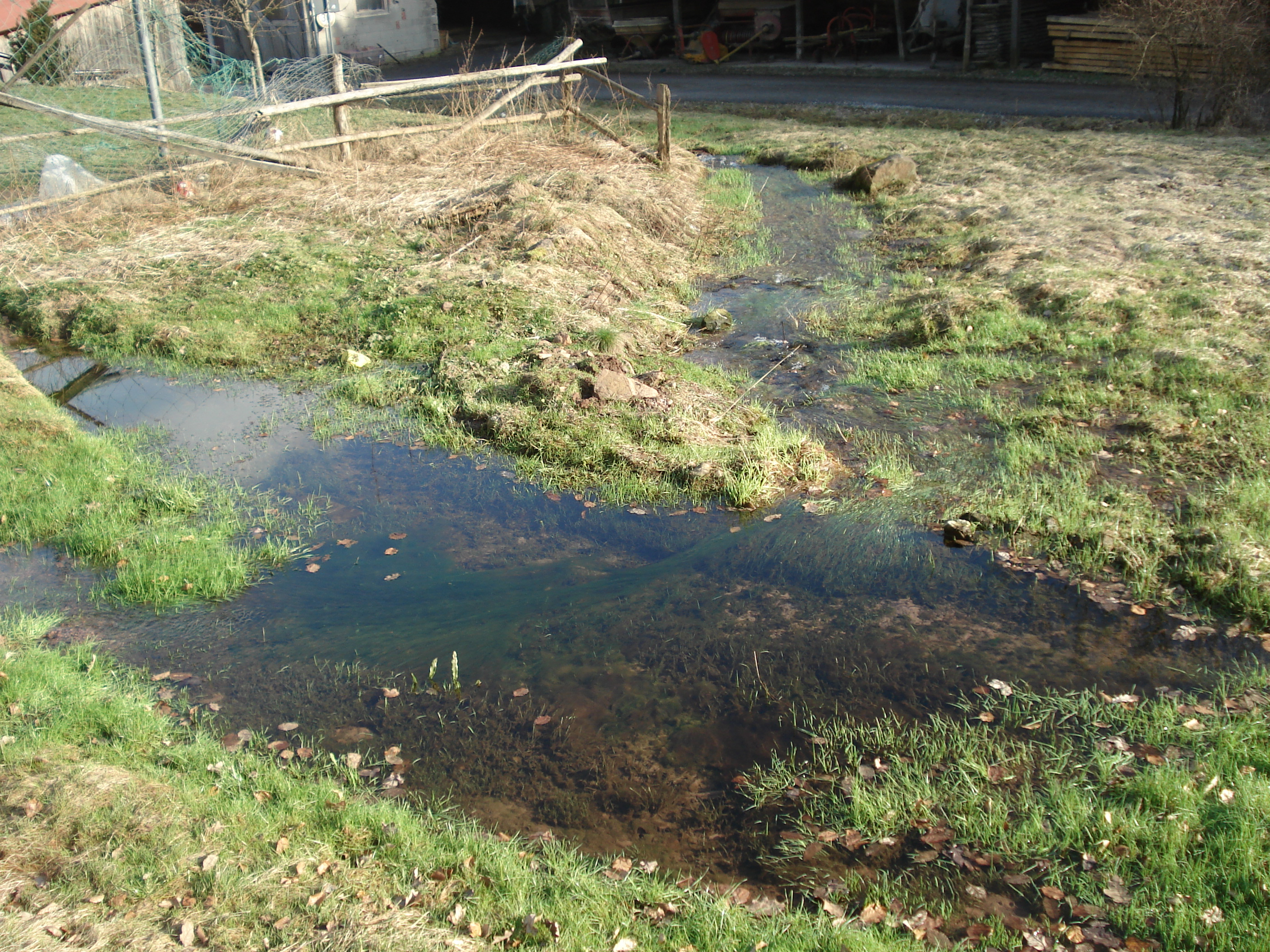
Source of the Wohnroder Bach

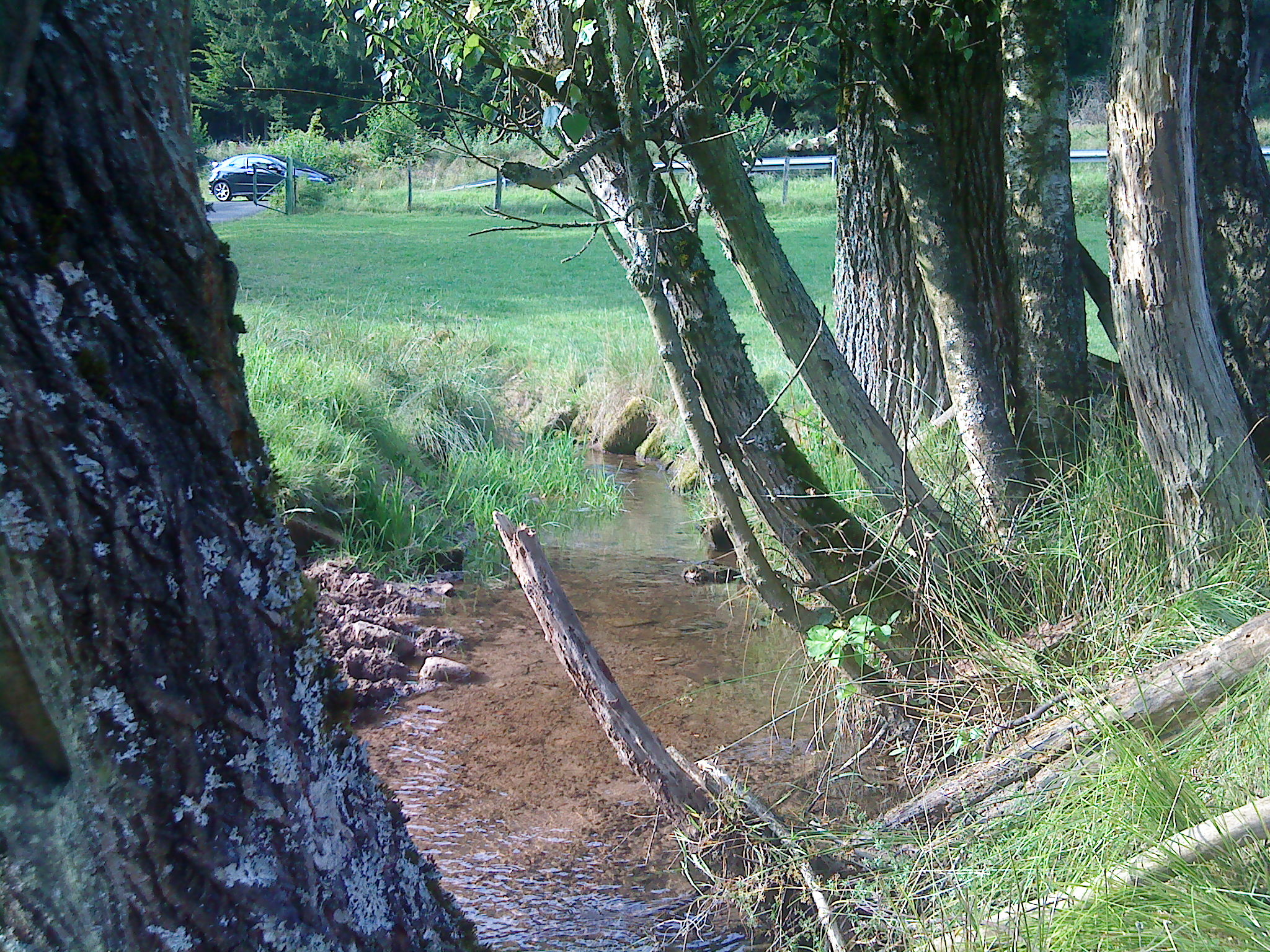
The Wohnroder Bach shortly before it flows into the Fellach

== See also ==
- List of rivers of Bavaria
