= Sinn Valley Railway =

Jossa–Wildflecken
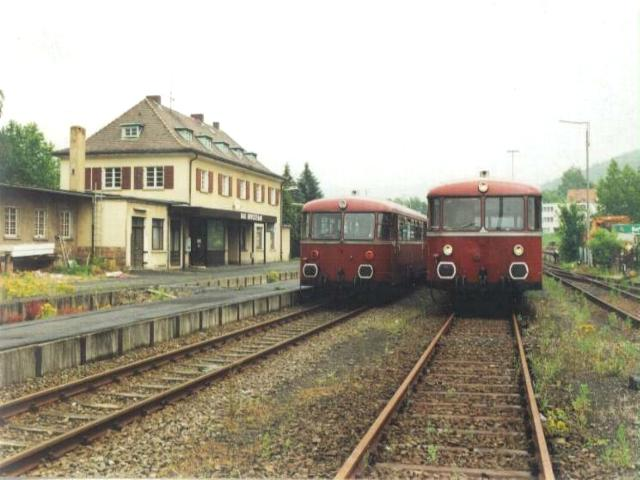
- Train crossing in Bad Brückenau (1988)

Overview
- Line number: 5211

Service
- Route number: 801 (1988)

Technical
- Line length: 30.7 km
- Track gauge: 1435 mm

The Sinn Valley Railway (German: Sinntalbahn, Sinn pronounced "zin") was a branch line that began in the Hessian village of Jossa and ran to Wildflecken via Altengronau in the Bavarian borough of Bad Brückenau.

The line runs from Jossa, initially on the same railway tracks as the line from Flieden to Fulda (the Flieden–Gemünden railway). Shortly after Jossa it branches off onto its own trackbed and runs up the Sinn Valley and into the Rhön Mountains. The railway largely follows the course of the Sinn.

== Literature ==
- Jürgen Lieb: Dampf und Diesel auf der Nebenstrecke Jossa – Bad Brückenau – Wildflecken. Eigenverlag, 2004 edition.
