= Sinntal =

- Municipality
- Coat of arms

- Location of Sinntal within Main-Kinzig-Kreis district
- Interactive map of Sinntal
- Location within Germany Location within Hesse
- Coordinates: 50°16′N 9°38′E
- Country: Germany
- State: Hesse
- Admin. region: Darmstadt
- District: Main-Kinzig-Kreis
- Subdivisions: 12 districts

Government
  - Mayor (2022–28): Thomas Henfling

Area
  - Total: 111.82 km^{2} (43.17 sq mi)
- Elevation: 220–585 m (722–1,919 ft)

Population (2025-12-31)
  - Total: 8,588
  - Density: 76.80/km^{2} (198.9/sq mi)
- Time zone: UTC+01:00 (CET)
  - Summer (DST): UTC+02:00 (CEST)
- Postal codes: 36391
- Dialling codes: 06664, 06665 (Altengronau, Jossa, Neuengronau), 09741 (Züntersbach)
- Vehicle registration: MKK, GN, SLÜ
- Website: www.sinntal.de

Sinntal (German pronunciation: [ˈzɪntaːl], lit. 'Sinn Valley') is a municipality in the Main-Kinzig district, in Hesse, Germany. It has a population of around 8,800.

== Geography ==
=== Location ===
Sinntal is located around 30 km south of Fulda in the Main-Kinzig district of Hesse.

The municipal territory lies at elevations between 220 and 585 m above NHN. It includes area in the Mittelgebirge Spessart and Rhön.

Sinntal is located right at the border between Hesse and Bavaria. It stretches across the valley of the Sinn river from which it takes its name.

=== Subdivisions ===
Sinntal consists of the following Ortsteile:

- Altengronau
- Breunings
- Jossa
- Mottgers
- Neuengronau
- Oberzell with Ziegelhütte
- Sannerz
- Schwarzenfels
- Sterbfritz (seat of the municipal administration)
- Weichersbach
- Weiperz
- Züntersbach

=== Neighbouring communities ===
Sinntal borders on (from the north, clockwise): Kalbach (Hesse), Motten, the unincorporated area Mottener Forst-Süd, Bad Brückenau, Zeitlofs, the unincorporated area Roßbacher Forst, Obersinn (all Bavaria), the unincorporated area Gutsbezirk Spessart (Hesse) and Schlüchtern (Hesse).

== Governance ==
The mayor of Sinntal is Thomas Henfling (since 2022).

== Infrastructure ==
=== Transport ===
Sinntal lies on the Hanover-Würzburg high-speed rail line. Germany's longest tunnel, the Landrücken Tunnel is located in the northern part of the municipal territory.

The closest motorway is the Bundesautobahn 7. The nearest interchange is in "Bad Brückenau".

== Sights ==
Castle Schwarzenfels

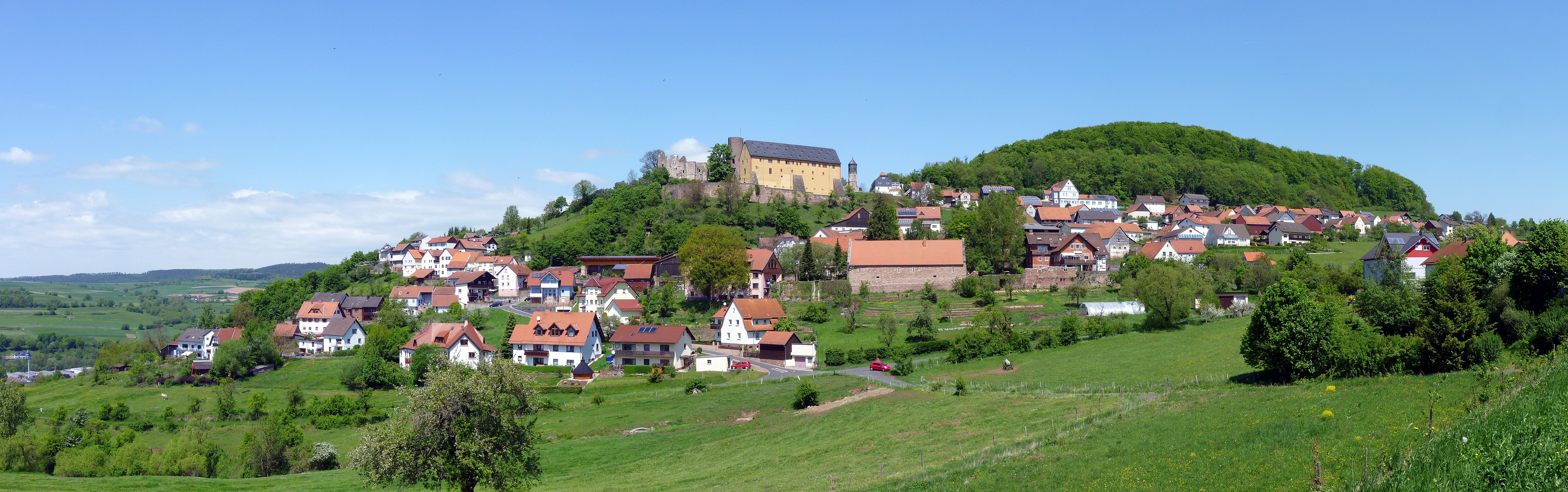
Schwarzenfels, with the castle in the Background
