= Rengersbrunner Bach =

River in Germany

Location
- Country: Germany
- State: Bavaria

Physical characteristics
- Mouth
  - location: Fellach
  - coordinates: 50.1415°N 9.5664°E

Basin features
- Progression: Fellach→ Aura→ Sinn→ Franconian Saale→ Main→ Rhine→ North Sea

Rengersbrunner Bach is a river of Bavaria, Germany. It is a headstream of the Fellach.

== See also ==
- List of rivers of Bavaria
