= Burgsinn =

- Municipality
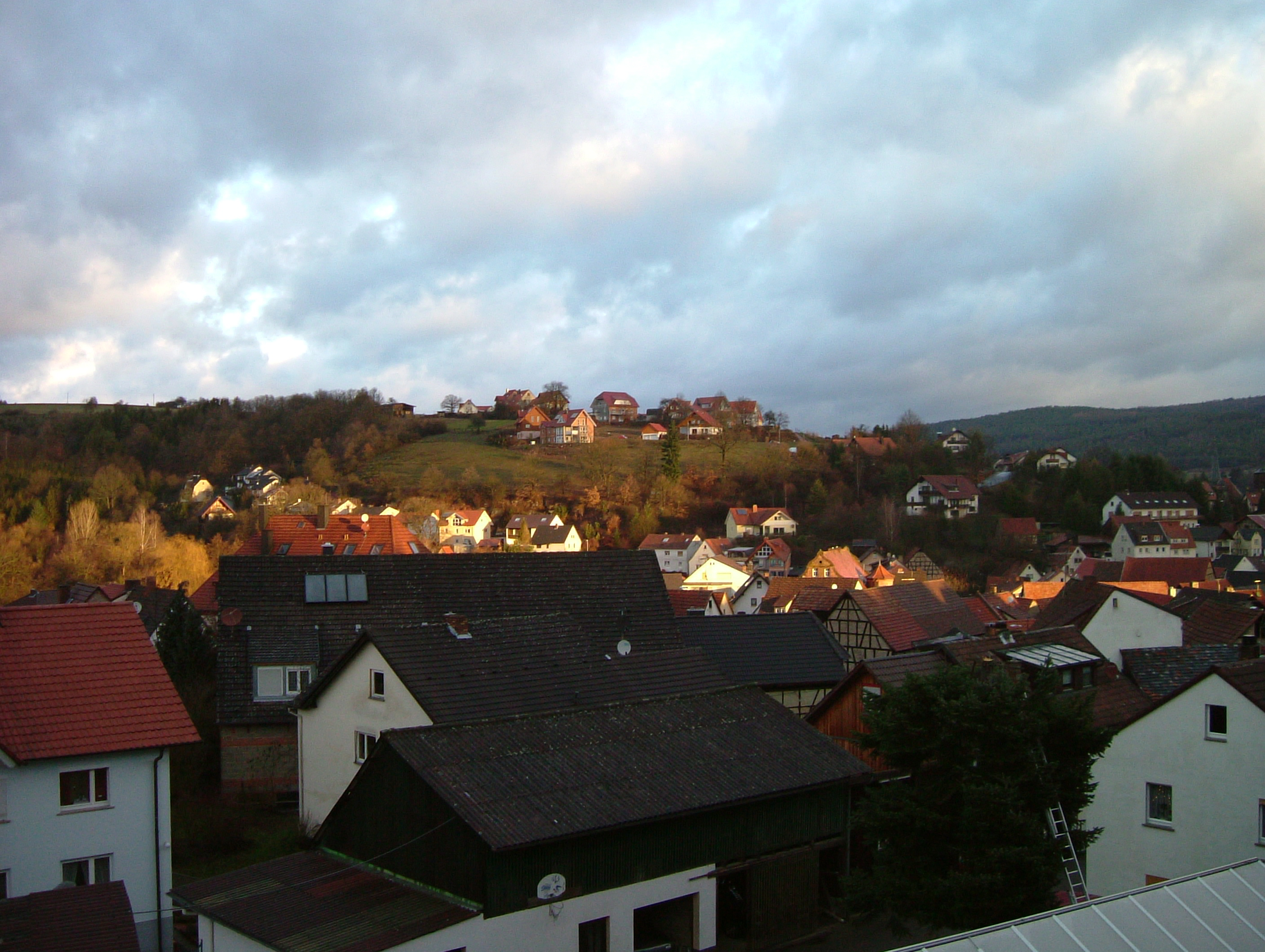
- View from the Mäusberg over Burgsinn

- Coat of arms

- Location of Burgsinn within Main-Spessart district
- Interactive map of Burgsinn
- Location within Germany Location within Bavaria
- Coordinates: 50°09′N 09°39′E
- Country: Germany
- State: Bavaria
- Admin. region: Unterfranken
- District: Main-Spessart
- Municipal assoc.: Burgsinn

Government
  - Mayor (2020–26): Robert Herold

Area
  - Total: 51.31 km^{2} (19.81 sq mi)
- Elevation: 190 m (620 ft)

Population (2025-12-31)
  - Total: 2,306
  - Density: 44.94/km^{2} (116.4/sq mi)
- Time zone: UTC+01:00 (CET)
  - Summer (DST): UTC+02:00 (CEST)
- Postal codes: 97775
- Dialling codes: 09356
- Vehicle registration: MSP
- Website: Municipal website

Burgsinn (German pronunciation: [ˈbʊʁkˌzɪn]) is a market municipality in the Main-Spessart district in the Regierungsbezirk of Lower Franconia (Unterfranken) in Bavaria, Germany and the seat of the Verwaltungsgemeinschaft (municipal association) of Burgsinn. It has a population of around 2,500.

== Geography ==
=== Location ===
Burgsinn lies in the Main-Spessart district, in the Mittelgebirge Spessart. It is located in the valley of the river Sinn from which it takes its name.

=== Subdivisions ===
The community has only the Gemarkung (traditional rural cadastral area) of Burgsinn. The municipal territory stretches into the wooded hills east and west of the Sinn valley.

=== Neighbouring communities ===
Burgsinn borders on (from the north, clockwise): Mittelsinn, the unincorporated areas Forst Aura and Omerz und Roter Berg, Wartmannsroth, Gräfendorf, Rieneck, Herrnwald (unincorporated area), Fellen and Aura im Sinngrund.

== History ==
A stone hatchet found in Burgsinn, from the final days of the Neolithic Münchshöfener Kultur bears witness to the first known human presence in the municipal area.

In 812 a document from Fulda Abbey mentioned the Sinngau ("Sinn District"), or in the spelling of the time, Sinnahgeuue. From the year 1001 comes the first written proof of the community's existence; at that time it was the village of Sinna, a Würzburg holding. In 1303 a source speaks of Burgmannen of Gotzo, Aplo et Her (mannus) de Sinne occupying the Sinna border fortifications. In 1334, Emperor Ludwig der Bayer granted dem Dorf zu Synne ("The Village at Synne") everlasting market rights. In 1338, Dietz von Thüngen became hereditary Burgmann and lord of the castle and locality of Sinna. Dietz von Thüngen's son Wilhelm acquired the Burgsinn lordship, with all appurtenances, in 1405 for 10,000 Gulden

From 1405 until 1814 (with an interruption in the 17th century), Burgsinn was the seat of the Thüngen family (see House of Thüngen (German).

The former knightly estate of the Barons of Thüngen was mediatized by Prince Primate von Dalberg's Principality of Aschaffenburg. In 1808, it was traded to the Grand Duchy of Würzburg, with which it passed to the Kingdom of Bavaria in 1814.

A weird incident took place in April 2026, when 50 sheep invaded a Penny supermarket, causing customers to climb on the counters to escape.

== Economy ==
According to official statistics, there were 5 workers on the social welfare contribution rolls working in agriculture and forestry in 1998. In producing businesses this was 193, and in trade and transport 140. In other areas, 136 workers on the social welfare contribution rolls were employed, and 878 such workers worked from home. There were 3 processing businesses. Three businesses were in construction, and furthermore, in 1999, there were 24 agricultural operations with a working area of 371 ha, of which 29 ha was cropland and 325 ha was meadowland.

Municipal taxes in 1999 amounted to €1,065,000 (converted), of which net business taxes amounted to €155,000.

== Governance ==
In 2014, Robert Herold (BüLi) was elected mayor with 58,4% of votes cast.

=== Coat of arms ===
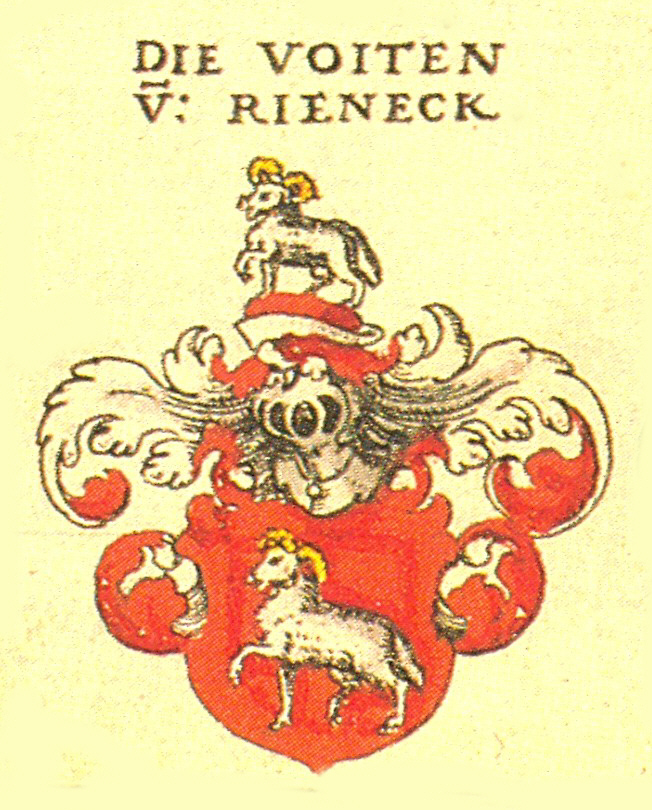
Voit von Rieneck family's coat of arms according to Siebmachers Wappenbuch

The community's arms might be described thus: Or a ram's attire gules.

The ram's horn can have been taken from neither the arms borne by the Barons of Thüngen nor those borne by the Counts of Rieneck, even though both families are tightly bound with Burgsinn's history. While the half of Castle Burgsinn that the Counts of Rieneck held in fief passed, when the Counts’ Rothenfels line died out, back to Würzburg in 1333, with the Barons of Thüngen buying the whole castle in 1405 from Würzburg, it was the Voit von Rieneck family, long the Vögte at Rieneck, who were until the 15th century holders of part of the tithes and of the court at Mittelsinn.

In 1630, when the Electorate of Mainz moved to strip the family Thüngen of their fief, the court at Burgsinn was held by the von Rieneck family's steward. The Counts of Rieneck had already died out in the early 16th century. After the Thüngens were reinstated in Burgsinn in 1697, besides various other agreements made by the community, the community received an explicit assurance that it could use “its old village seal”. What kind of seal this was and from what time it came is not said, but since the Voit von Rieneck family bore a ram in its coat of arms, it can be assumed with a likelihood bordering on certainty that Burgsinn's coat of arms was a reduced version of the Voit von Rieneck family's.

== Arts, culture and sightseeing ==
=== Monuments ===
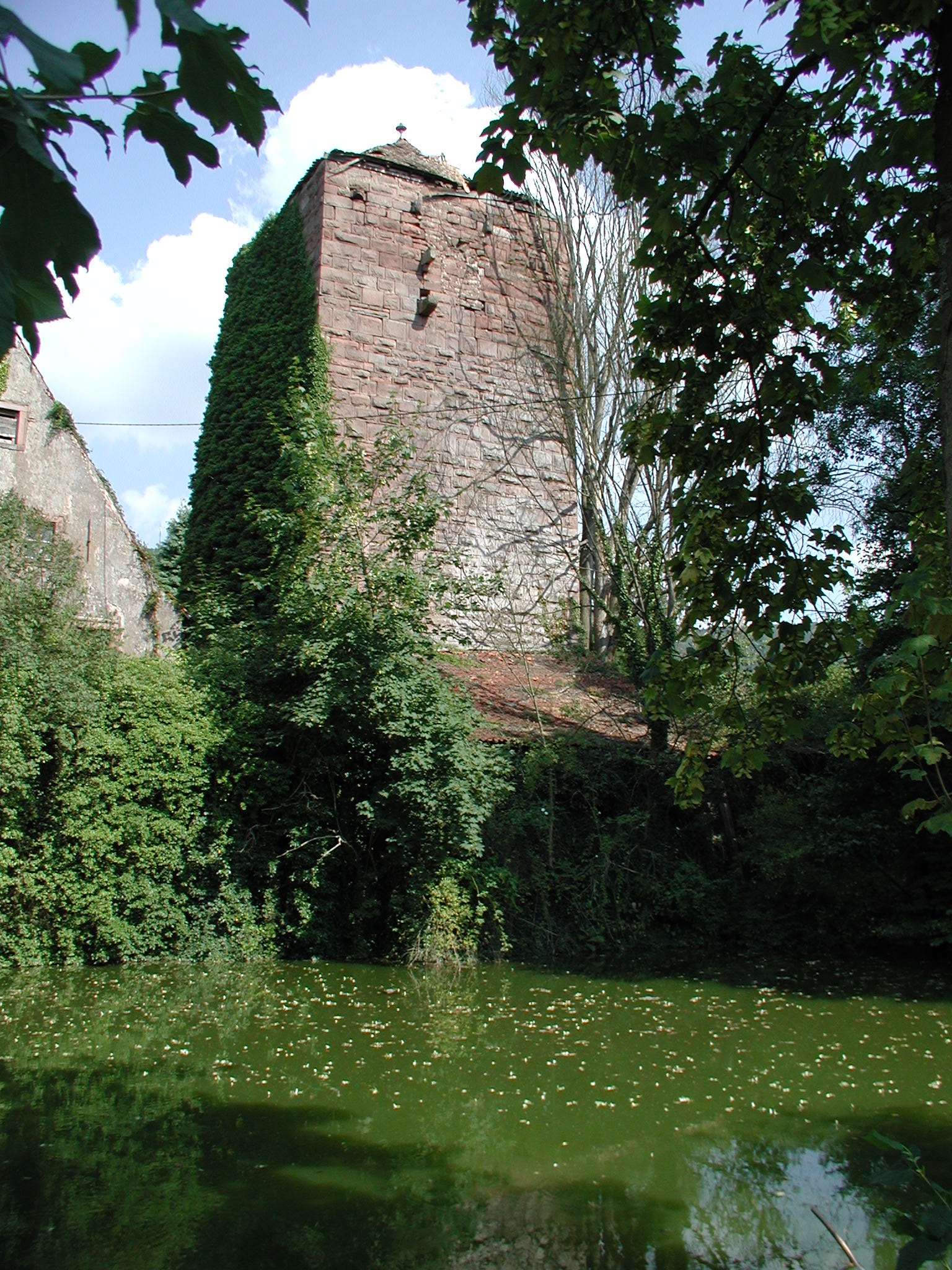
Keep at the castle

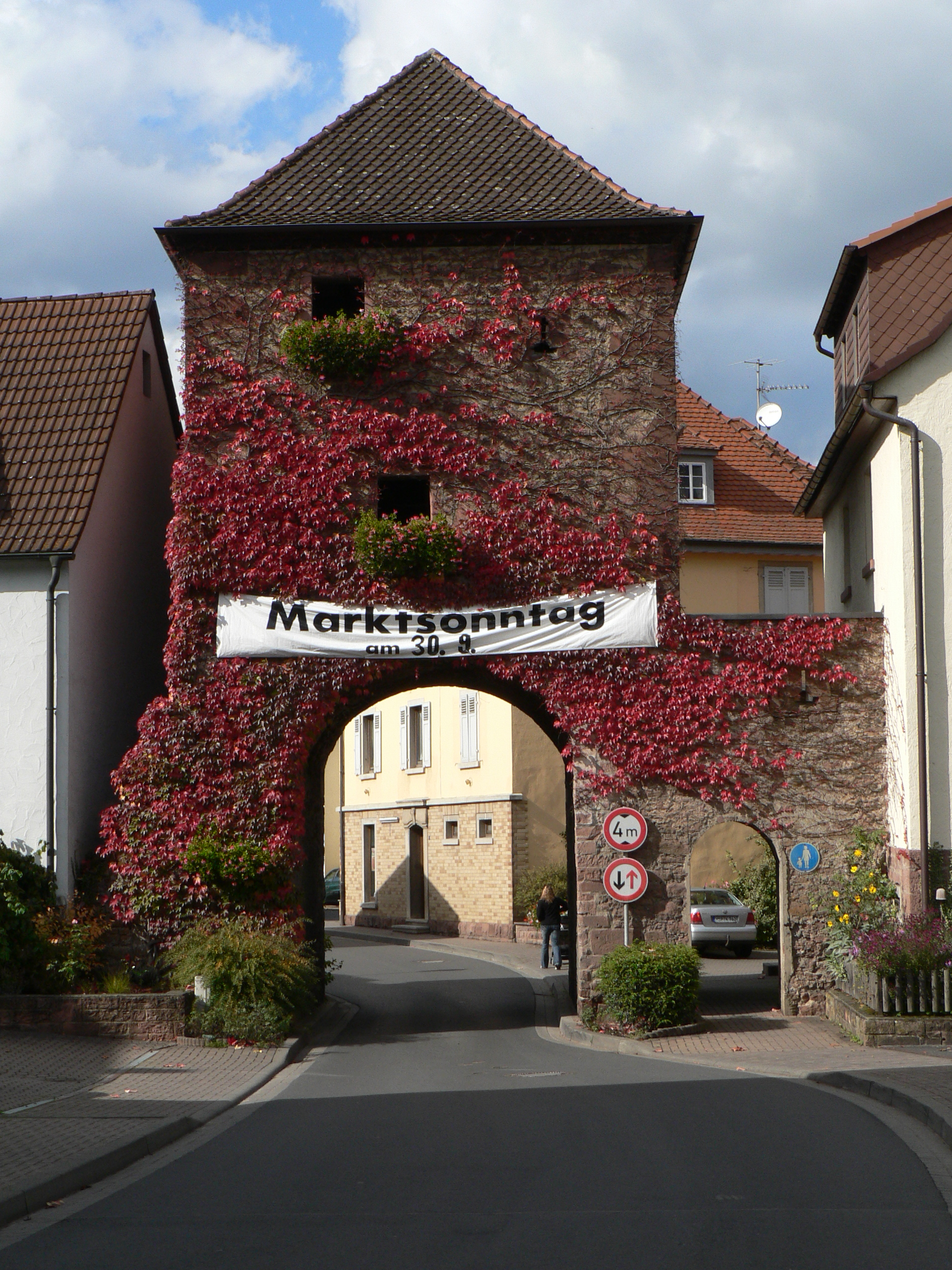
Rienecker Tor (town gate)

- The castle (Burg in German, meaning a mediaeval military fortification), also called Altes Schloss is laid out like a typical moated castle with a tower at each of the four corners. At the entry into the castle stands a 22 m-tall keep with each side 8.5 m in length and walls of 2.6 m thickness. Construction of the tower has been dated to the 12th century. The buildings that are still standing were converted or renovated in the 16th or 17th century. The castle is private property.
- Neues Schloss, late Renaissance
- Fronhöfer Schlösschen, Renaissance building from the early 17th century
- Rienecker Tor, only remaining town gate
- Parish church of St. Martin

There is also a park complex in the community and the cycle paths around Burgsinn run from Würzburg all the way to Fulda.

== Infrastructure ==
=== Transport ===
Burgsinn lies on the Hanover-Würzburg high-speed rail line and the Flieden–Gemünden railway line. At the Betriebsbahnhof Burgsinn (depot), trains can be switched between the old and new lines.

The Staatsstrasse 2303 passes through Burgsinn. To the south it connects to Bundesstrasse 26 at Langenprozelten/Gemünden.

=== Health ===
Medical services are provided by three general practitioners with surgeries in the community, one dentist, a pharmacist and two physiotherapists. Furthermore, there is a Bavarian Red Cross rescue station in Burgsinn equipped with an ambulance.

=== Leisure ===
Burgsinn has at its disposal a relatively big outdoor swimming pool with a 50 m-long basin which includes a diving tower area (1, 2 and 3 m), a basin for non-swimmers with a slide and a wading pool. The complex also has a beach volleyball court.

== Education ==
As of 1999 the following institutions existed in Burgsinn:

- Kindergarten: 100 places with 103 children
- Primary school-Hauptschule with 23 teachers and 359 students (as of 2007/2008 school year)
