= Schmale Sinn =

River in Germany

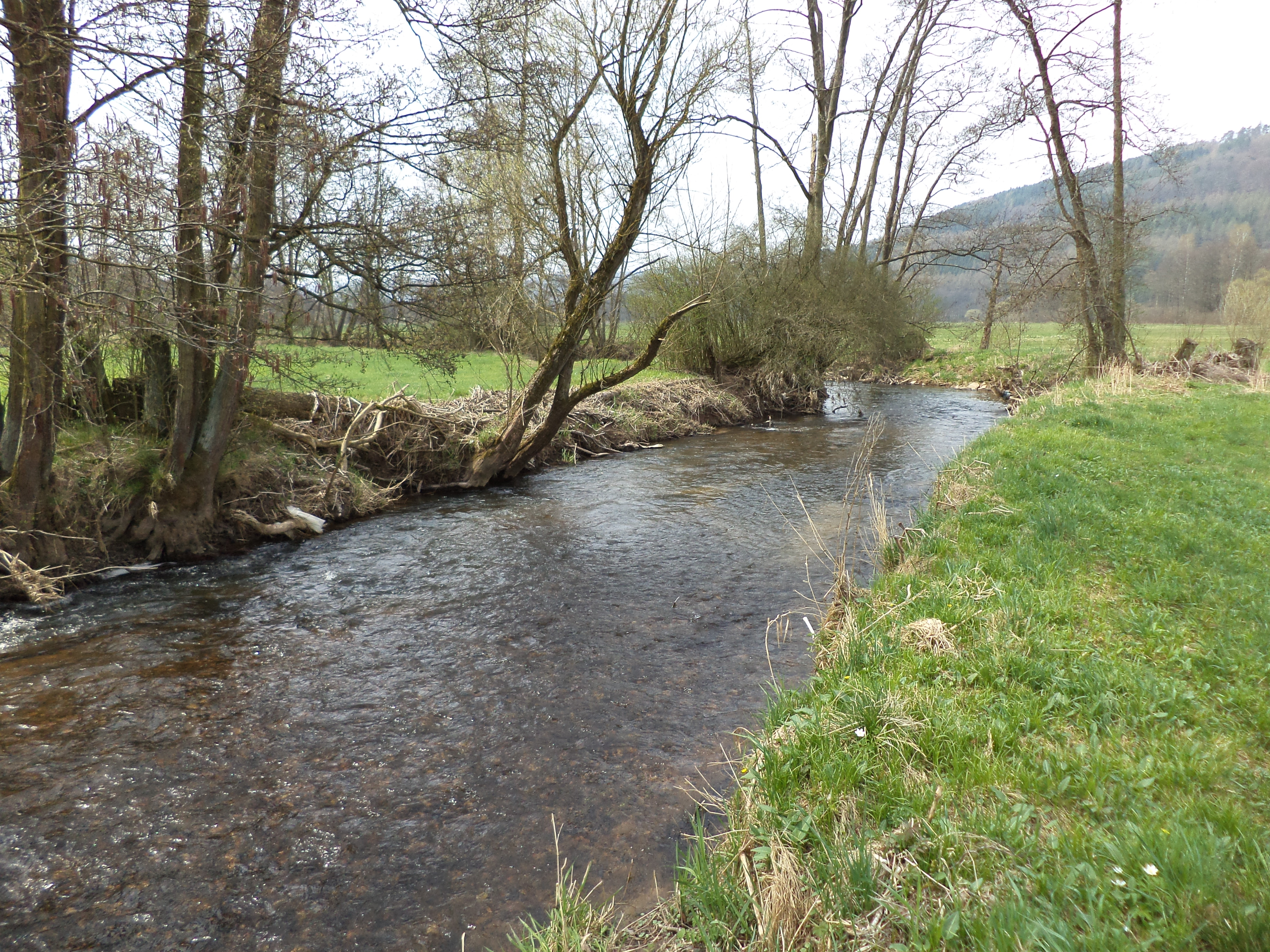
- The Schmale Sinn close to its confluence with the Sinn

Location
- Country: Germany
- States: Bavaria and Hesse

Physical characteristics
- Mouth
  - location: Sinn
  - coordinates: 50.2568°N 9.6416°E
- Length: 32.4 km (20.1 mi)
- Basin size: 104 km^{2} (40 sq mi)

Basin features
- Progression: Sinn→ Franconian Saale→ Main→ Rhine→ North Sea

Schmale Sinn (German pronunciation: [ˈʃmaːlə ˈzɪn], lit. 'Narrow Sinn'; in its upper course in Bavaria: Kleine Sinn, 'Little Sinn') is a river of Bavaria and Hesse, Germany. It is a right tributary of the Sinn near Zeitlofs. Via the Franconian Saale it discharges into the Main.

== See also ==
- List of rivers of Hesse
