= Gronau (Sinn) =

River in Germany

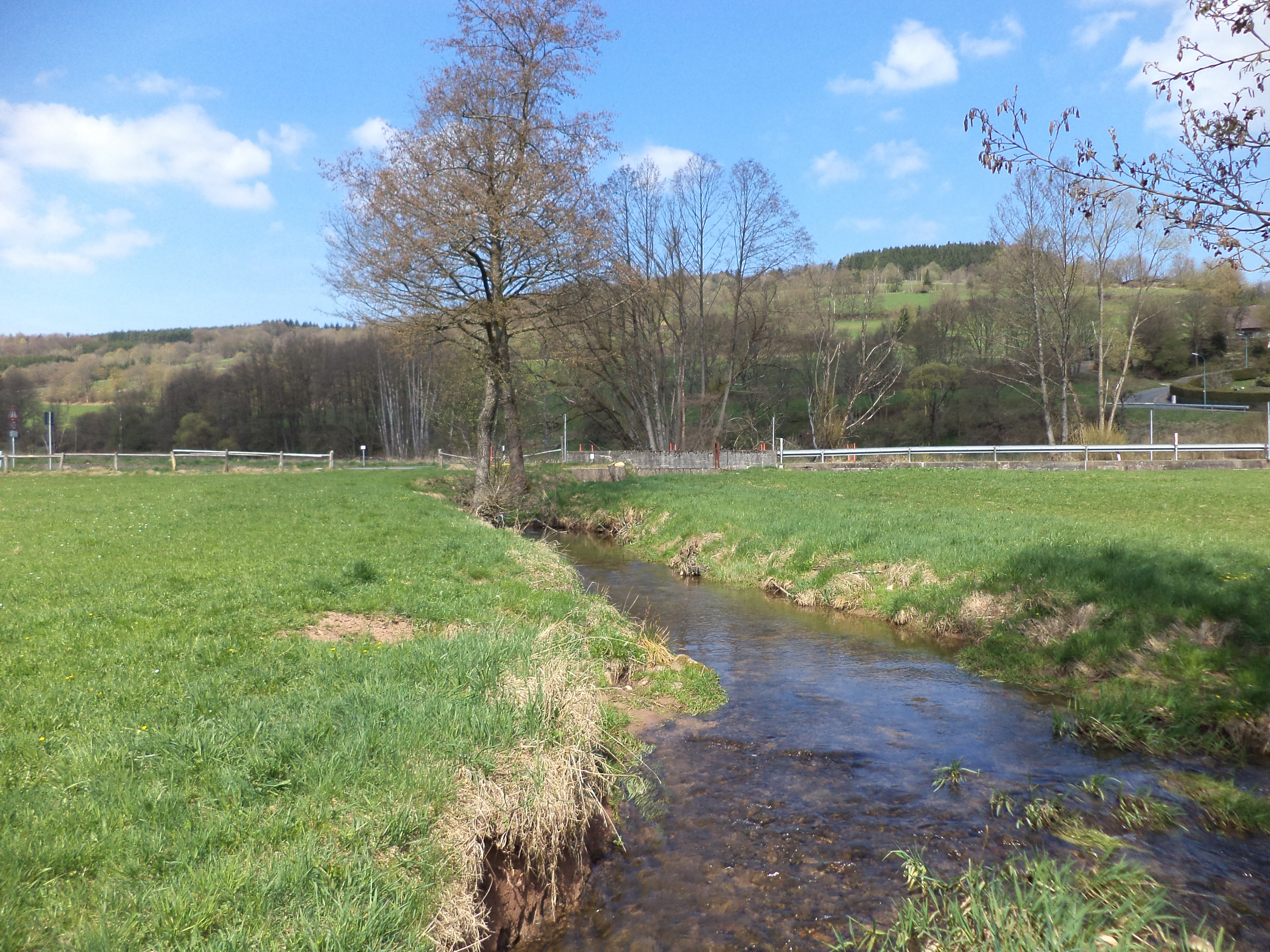
- Gronau near Neuengronau

Location
- Country: Germany
- State: Hesse

Physical characteristics
- Source
  - location: Gutsbezirk Spessart
- Mouth
  - location: Altengronau
  - coordinates: 50.2450°N 9.6150°E
- Length: 9.7 km (6.0 mi)
- Basin size: 26.4 km^{2} (10.2 sq mi)

Basin features
- Progression: Sinn→ Franconian Saale→ Main→ Rhine→ North Sea

Gronau (German pronunciation: [ˈɡʁoːnaʊ]) is a river of Hesse, Germany and a right tributary of the Sinn. Including its left source river Westernbach, it has a total length of 9.7 kilometres (6.0 mi).

== Course ==
The Gronau rises in the unincorporated area Gutsbezirk Spessart in the Hessian part of the Mittelgebirge Spessart. It flows into the Sinn at Altengronau.

== See also ==
- List of rivers of Hesse
