= Fellach =

River in Germany

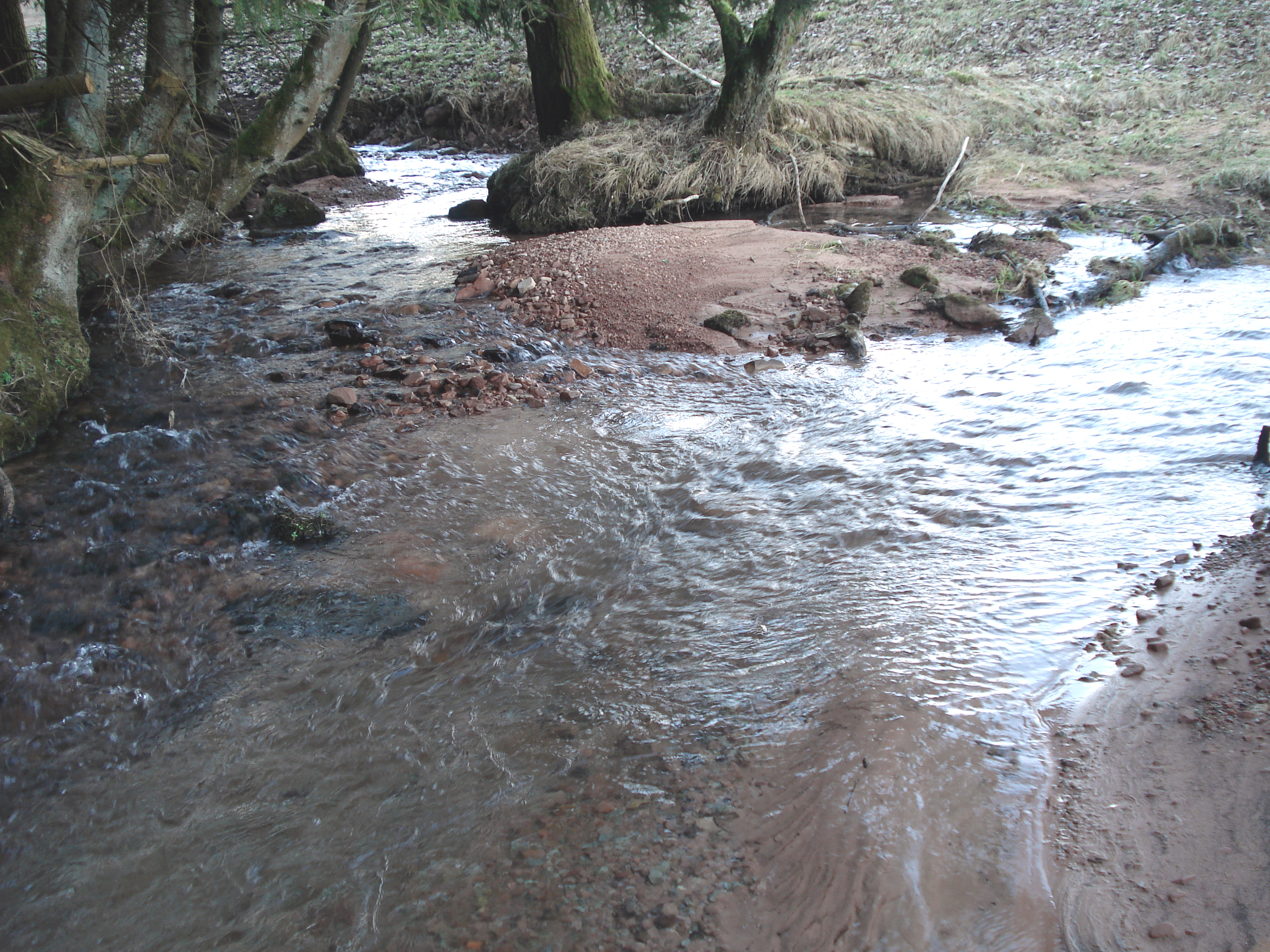
- The confluence of the Rengersbrunner Bach (left, background) and Wohnroder Bach (right) forming the Fellach (foreground)

Location
- Country: Germany
- State: Bavaria

Physical characteristics
- Mouth
  - location: Aura
  - coordinates: 50.1551°N 9.5992°E
- Length: 6.4 km (4.0 mi)

Basin features
- Progression: Aura→ Sinn→ Franconian Saale→ Main→ Rhine→ North Sea

Fellach (German pronunciation: [ˈfɛlax]; also: Fella) is a small river of Bavaria, Germany. It is formed by the confluence of the two rivers Rengersbrunner Bach and Wohnroder Bach at the western edge of Wohnrod, a part of the municipality Fellen. It flows into the Aura in Fellen.

== See also ==
- List of rivers of Bavaria
