= Burgsinn (Verwaltungsgemeinschaft) =

- Verwaltungsgemeinschaft
- Location of Burgsinn within Main-Spessart district
- Interactive map of Burgsinn
- Location within Germany Location within Bavaria
- Coordinates: 50°09′N 9°39′E
- Country: Germany
- State: Bavaria
- Admin. region: Lower Franconia
- District: Main-Spessart
- Seat: Burgsinn
- Subdivisions: 5 municipalities

Area
  - Total: 123.73 km^{2} (47.77 sq mi)

Population (2025-12-31)
  - Total: 5,728
  - Density: 46.29/km^{2} (119.9/sq mi)
- Time zone: UTC+01:00 (CET)
  - Summer (DST): UTC+02:00 (CEST)
- Website: vgem-burgsinn.de

Burgsinn is a Verwaltungsgemeinschaft (municipal association) in the district Main-Spessart in Bavaria, Germany. Its seat is in Burgsinn.

It consists of the following municipalities:

1. Aura im Sinngrund
2. Burgsinn
3. Fellen
4. Mittelsinn
5. Obersinn
