= Aura (Sinn) =

River in Germany

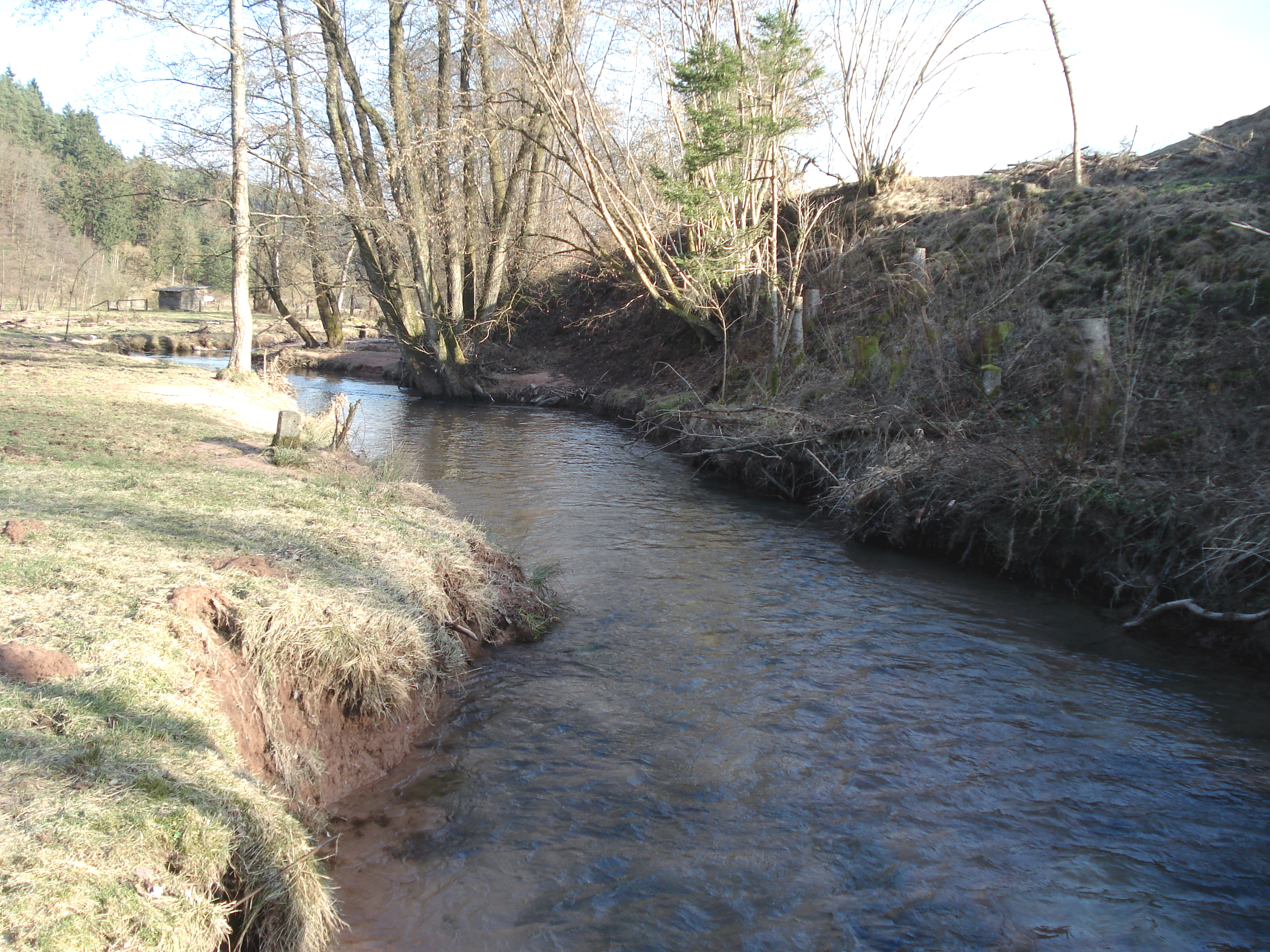
- The Aura near its junction with the Fellach

- Location of the mouth in Bavaria

Location
- Country: Germany
- State: Bavaria

Physical characteristics
- Source
  - location: Forst Aura
- Mouth
  - location: Burgsinn
  - coordinates: 50.1465°N 9.6538°E
- Length: 13.3 kilometres (8.3 mi)
- Basin size: 59.2 square kilometres (22.9 mi^{2})

Basin features
- Progression: Sinn→ Franconian Saale→ Main→ Rhine→ North Sea
- Tributaries
  - right: Fellach

The Aura (German pronunciation: [ˈaʊʁa]) is a 13.3 kilometres (8.3 mi) tributary of the Sinn River in Bavaria, Germany.

== Name ==
The name Aura originates from the Old High German Uraha. The word ur meant Aurochs, and the word aha meant stream, meaning it was a river where Aurochs lived. The river gives the Gemeinde Aura im Sinngrund its name.

== Course ==
The river originates in the Forst Aura in a valley near Aura im Sinngrund and flows in a southerly direction. In Fellen, it meets its largest tributary, the Fellach. At its mouth, the Aura then turns to the east. The mouth of the river is in Burgsinn, where it flows into the Flutgraben, an anabranch of the Sinn.

== See also ==
- List of rivers of Bavaria
