= Johann Altfuldisch =

Johann Altfuldisch (born November 11, 1911, Brückenau, Germany — died May 28, 1947, Landsberg am Lech, Bavaria, Germany) was SS-Obersturmführer and a guard at Mauthausen-Gusen concentration camp where temporarily he was vice-chief of its central part.

Altfuldisch was a member of the NSDAP and later on he joined the SS. In 1936 he began working at Sachsenhausen concentration camp. In 1938 he joined the Waffen-SS. Between 1938 and 1945 he held the second highest-ranking position at Mauthausen concentration camp, where he ordered and personally participated in many executions.

Hans Altfuldisch, second Schutzhaftlagerführer in Mauthausen, was accused by the witnesses to beat prisoners and that he was present when certain groups, for example allied prisoners of war were killed.

After the end of World War II, he was charged by the U.S. military court at Dachau to have participated in "executions of special ethnic groups or war prisoners". On May 13, 1946, he was found guilty of committing the above-mentioned crimes. He was hanged on May 28, 1947, at the prison for war criminals at Landsberg Prison. His last words were

"I die for Germany!"

== Literature ==
- Ernst Klee: Das Personenlexikon zum Dritten Reich: Wer war was vor und nach 1945. Fischer-Taschenbuch-Verlag, Frankfurt am Main 2007. ISBN 978-3-596-16048-8. {ger}
