= Stiftes =

Mountain in Hesse, Germany

Coordinates: 50°19′N 9°42′E

Highest point
- Elevation: 567.7 m (1,863 ft)

Geography
- Location: Hesse, Germany

Stiftes is a mountain of Hesse, Germany.
