= Aura im Sinngrund =

- Municipality
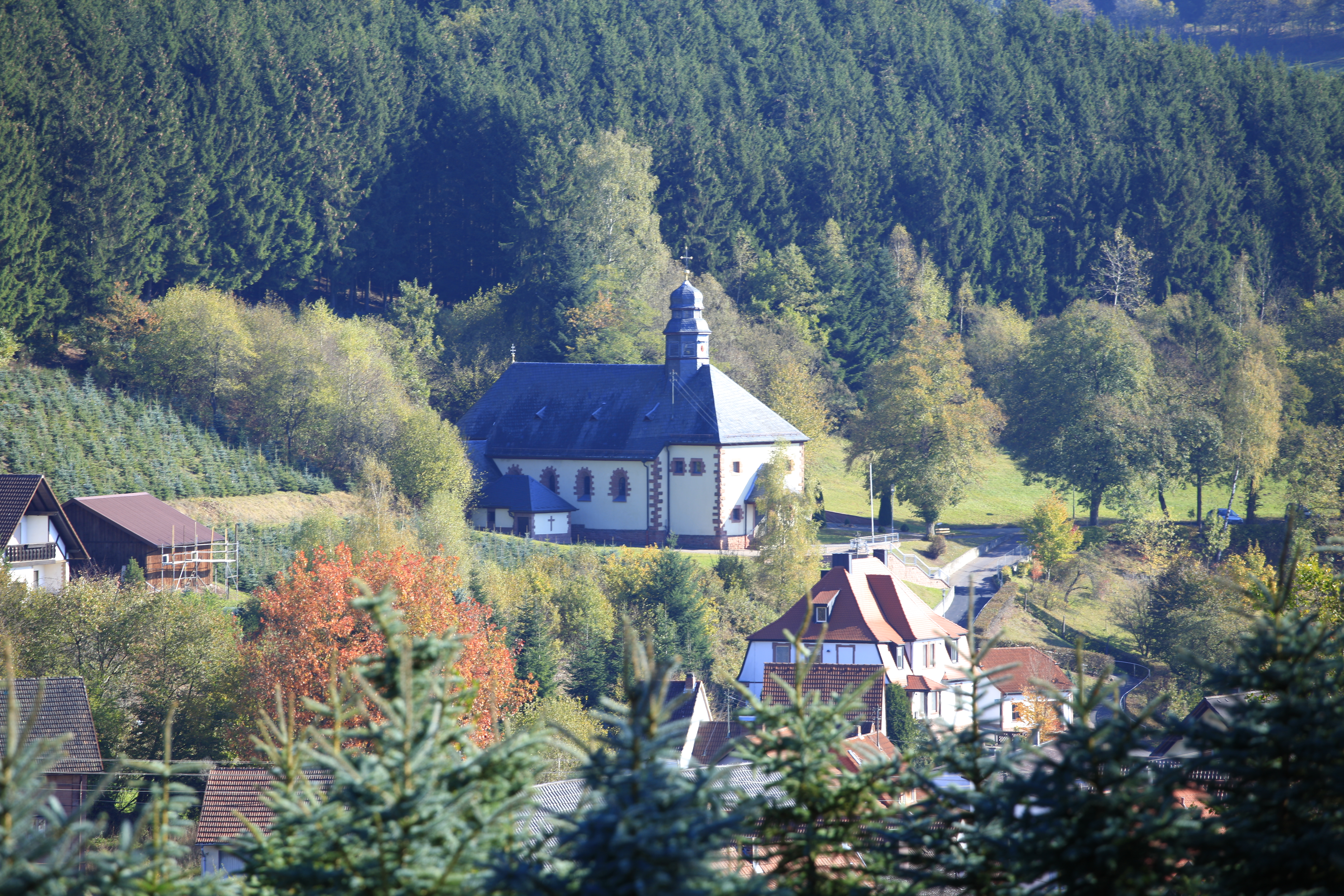
- Church of Our Lady of the Seven Sorrows

- Coat of arms

- Location of Aura im Sinngrund within Main-Spessart district
- Interactive map of Aura im Sinngrund
- Location within Germany Location within Bavaria
- Coordinates: 50°10′N 9°34′E
- Country: Germany
- State: Bavaria
- Admin. region: Unterfranken
- District: Main-Spessart
- Municipal assoc.: Burgsinn

Government
  - Mayor (2020–26): Wolfgang Blum (SPD)

Area
  - Total: 12.07 km^{2} (4.66 sq mi)
- Elevation: 282 m (925 ft)

Population (2025-12-31)
  - Total: 913
  - Density: 75.6/km^{2} (196/sq mi)
- Time zone: UTC+01:00 (CET)
  - Summer (DST): UTC+02:00 (CEST)
- Postal codes: 97773
- Dialling codes: 0 93 56
- Vehicle registration: MSP
- Website: www.aura-im-sinngrund.de

Aura im Sinngrund (officially: Aura i. Sinngrund) is a municipality in the Main-Spessart district in the Regierungsbezirk of Lower Franconia (Unterfranken) in Bavaria, Germany and a member of the Verwaltungsgemeinschaft (municipal association) of Burgsinn.

== Geography ==
=== Location ===
The community lies some 20 km northwest of Gemünden am Main in the valley of the Aura river in the Spessart Nature Park (Naturpark Spessart). The community's northern limit forms Bavaria's boundary with Hesse.

== History ==
In 1059, Aura had its first documentary mention in a document conferring rights in the royal hunting forest on the Fulda Abbey. In 1803 most of the former Prince-Bishopric of Würzburg Amt was made part of Prince Primate von Dalberg's newly formed Principality of Aschaffenburg. In 1808 it became a condominium of the Kingdom of Bavaria and the Electorate of Hesse-Kassel, falling entirely to Bavaria in 1814. In the course of administrative reform in Bavaria, the current community came into being with the Gemeindeedikt (“Municipal Edict”) of 1818.

== Demographics ==
Historical population
Year	Pop.	±% p.a.
1970	1,134	—
1987	1,104	−0.16%
2002	1,085	−0.12%
2003	1,074	−1.01%
2005	1,073	−0.05%
2007	1,047	−1.22%
2015	1,010	−0.45%
2020	961	−0.99%
Source: Bayerisches Landesamt für Statistik (2015-2020)

The current population is around 1,000.

== Economy ==
Municipal taxes in 1999 amounted to €407,000 (converted), of which net business taxes amounted to €13,000.

== Governance ==
Since March 2008 Wolfgang Blum (SPD/UAB) has been the mayor. He replaced Walter Sachs (CDU).

=== Coat of arms ===
The community's arms might be described thus: Quartered, first dancetty of three gules and argent, second barry of eight Or and of the first, third bendy of five of the first and third, fourth of the second a fess of the third paly wavy of three of the first.

Four historic coats of arms are marshalled on this escutcheon, each one representing a former overlord. The arms once borne by the Prince-Bishops of Würzburg appear on the dexter (armsbearer's right, viewer's left) side in chief (that is, in the upper row). Next to this are the arms of the Counts of Rieneck. On the dexter side in base (lower row) are those once borne by the Barons of Hutten, and beside this those borne by the Barons of Thüngen.

== Arts and culture ==
=== Buildings ===
The community's appearance is dominated by the Catholic Kuratienkirche zu den Sieben Schmerzen Mariens (Church of Our Lady of the Seven Sorrows).

The former castle (Schloss, originally a hunting lodge for the Prince-Bishops of Würzburg) nowadays houses Aura's primary school.

The former parish church St. Erasmus (13th century, Gothic) now serves as cemetery chapel.

See also: list of protected monuments in Aura (German)
