= Mittelsinn =

- Municipality
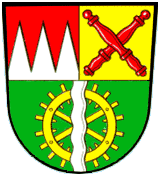
- Coat of arms

- Location of Mittelsinn within Main-Spessart district
- Interactive map of Mittelsinn
- Location within Germany Location within Bavaria
- Coordinates: 50°12′N 9°37′E
- Country: Germany
- State: Bavaria
- Admin. region: Unterfranken
- District: Main-Spessart
- Municipal assoc.: Burgsinn

Government
  - Mayor (2023–29): Dirk Schiefer

Area
  - Total: 14.32 km^{2} (5.53 sq mi)
- Elevation: 208 m (682 ft)

Population (2025-12-31)
  - Total: 743
  - Density: 51.9/km^{2} (134/sq mi)
- Time zone: UTC+01:00 (CET)
  - Summer (DST): UTC+02:00 (CEST)
- Postal codes: 97785
- Dialling codes: 09356
- Vehicle registration: MSP

Mittelsinn (German pronunciation: [ˈmɪtl̩ˌzɪn], lit. 'Middle Sinn') is a municipality in the Main-Spessart district in the Regierungsbezirk of Lower Franconia (Unterfranken) in Bavaria, Germany and a member of the Verwaltungsgemeinschaft (Administrative Community) of Burgsinn.

== Geography ==
=== Location ===
Mittelsinn lies in the Würzburg Region.

The community has the following Gemarkungen (traditional rural cadastral areas): Mittelsinn, Forst Aura.

== History ==
The greater part of the former Amt of the Princely Electorate (Hochstift) of Würzburg had passed by 1808 to the Principality of Aschaffenburg (in 1803 first to Bavaria, and then in 1805 to the Grand Duchy of Würzburg), with which it passed in 1814 to Bavaria. The local rights held by the Electorate of Hesse-Kassel, however, did not pass to Bavaria until 1860. In the course of administrative reform in Bavaria, the current community came into being with the Gemeindeedikt (“Municipal Edict”) of 1818.

No later than the 19th century, there were Jewish families living in Mittelsinn who formed their own community and built a synagogue. This was destroyed on Kristallnacht (9 November 1938), as recalled by a memorial plaque at the savings and loan institution across the street from the synagogue's former site.

== Politics ==
Municipal taxes in 1999 amounted to €435,000 (converted), of which net business taxes amounted to €101,000.

=== Coat of arms ===
The community's arms might be described thus: Per fess in chief dexter dancetty of three gules and argent, in chief sinister Or two official's staves in saltire of the first, in base vert a waterwheel spoked of six of the third surmounted by a pale wavy of the second.

On the escutcheon’s upper half, on the dexter (armsbearer’s right, viewer’s left) side, are the arms formerly borne by the Prince-Bishopric (Hochstift) of Würzburg, referring to the community’s former allegiance to that state. On the sinister (armsbearer’s left, viewer’s right) side, the two staves refer to the special tithe court whose seat Mittelsinn once was. They also symbolize the Hessian-Bavarian condominium that existed here from the early 19th century until 1866. From the 15th century, the lordship and court rights over Mittelsinn were held by several lords, leading to the creation of the Vierherrschaft, or “Four-Lordship”. Prime among these lords were the Lords of Thüngen and the Lords of Hutten, to whom the tinctures Or and gules (gold and red) refer, as both noble families’ arms showed these tinctures. The charges in the escutcheon's lower half, a waterwheel and a wavy pale (vertical stripe) symbolize the River Sinn and its mills. The tincture vert (green) stands for the community's rural character and for its location between the Rhön and the Spessart.

The arms have been borne since 1980 after a decision by the community council was approved by the government of Lower Franconia.

== Economy and infrastructure ==
Transport

Mittlesinn has a train station which is served by trains between Schlüchtern and Würzburg Hauptbahnhof

According to official statistics, there were 5 workers on the social welfare contribution rolls working in agriculture and forestry in 1998. In producing businesses this was 105, and in trade and transport 7. In other areas, 42 workers on the social welfare contribution rolls were employed, and 352 such workers worked from home. There were 4 processing businesses. One business was in construction, and furthermore, in 1999, there were 36 agricultural operations with a working area of 419 ha, of which 87 ha was cropland and 298 ha was meadowland.

=== Education ===
In 1999 the following institutions existed in Mittelsinn:

- Kindergartens: 50 places with 47 children

== Famous people ==
- Oswald Rothaug (b. 17 May 1897 in Mittelsinn; d. 4 December 1967 in Cologne), jurist in the Third Reich, as of 1943 Reich council at the Volksgerichtshof, sentenced to life imprisonment at Nuremberg in 1946, but released in 1956.
