= Obersinn =

- Municipality
- Coat of arms

- Location of Obersinn within Main-Spessart district
- Interactive map of Obersinn
- Location within Germany Location within Bavaria
- Coordinates: 50°13′N 9°37′E
- Country: Germany
- State: Bavaria
- Admin. region: Unterfranken
- District: Main-Spessart
- Municipal assoc.: Burgsinn

Government
  - Mayor (2020–26): Lioba Zieres

Area
  - Total: 11.69 km^{2} (4.51 sq mi)
- Elevation: 200 m (660 ft)

Population (2025-12-31)
  - Total: 928
  - Density: 79.4/km^{2} (206/sq mi)
- Time zone: UTC+01:00 (CET)
  - Summer (DST): UTC+02:00 (CEST)
- Postal codes: 97791
- Dialling codes: 09356
- Vehicle registration: MSP

Obersinn (German pronunciation: [ˈoːbɐˌzɪn], lit. 'Upper Sinn') is a market municipality in the Main-Spessart district in the Regierungsbezirk of Lower Franconia (Unterfranken) in Bavaria, Germany and a member of the Verwaltungsgemeinschaft (Administrative Community) of Burgsinn.

== Geography ==
=== Location ===
Obersinn lies in the Würzburg Region and is split into a Spessart half and a Rhön side by its namesake river, the Sinn. The landscape is characterized by fields, meadows and, above all, beech forests.

The municipality has the following subdivisions (Gemarkungen, traditional rural cadastral areas): Obersinn, Burgjoß, Forst Aura.

== History ==
The greater part of the local rights of the Princely Electorate (Hochstift) of Würzburg had passed in 1808 to the Principality of Aschaffenburg (after going first to Bavaria in 1803 and then to the Grand Duchy of Würzburg in 1805), with which it passed in 1814 back to Bavaria. Hesse-Kassel’s local rights passed to Bavaria only in 1860. In the course of administrative reform in Bavaria, the current community came into being with the Gemeindeedikt (“Municipal Edict”) of 1818.

== Politics ==
Since May 2008 Lioba Zieres (Freie Wählergemeinschaft) has led the community as the first woman to do so in any community in the old district of Gemünden.

Municipal taxes in 1999 amounted to €440,000 (converted), of which net business taxes amounted to €63,000.

=== Coat of arms ===
The community’s arms might be described thus: A pale wavy argent, dexter gules in chief a scallop shell reversed of the first, in base dancetty of three of the first, sinister vert in chief a letter H, on whose cross stroke a figure of 4, in base a beech leaf in bend sinister of the first.

The wavy pale stands for the river Sinn, the market community’s namesake. This river forms the geographical boundary between the Spessart and the Rhön. The three silver points in a red field, the so-called “Franconian rake”, recall the community’s long period of ownership by the Prince-Bishopric (Hochstift) of Würzburg. The silver shell is Saint James’s attribute, to whom the church in Obersinn is consecrated. The community’s rural character is represented by the beech leaf and the tincture vert (green). The ligature of the 4 and the H is an old boundary stone marker. It symbolized the four-lord condominium in this area, to which Obersinn belonged (H stands for Herr or Herrschaft, German for “Lord” or “Lordship”). Lasting from 1447 on into the 19th century, this political arrangement defined the market community’s history.

== Economy and infrastructure ==
According to official statistics, there were 64 workers on the social welfare contribution rolls working in producing businesses in 1998. In trade and transport this was 0. In other areas, 17 workers on the social welfare contribution rolls were employed, and 391 such workers worked from home. There was one processing business. Two businesses were in construction, and furthermore, in 1999, there were 22 agricultural operations with a working area of 296 ha, of which 94 ha was cropland and 198 ha was meadowland.

=== Education ===
In 1999 the following institutions existed in Obersinn:

- Kindergarten: 25 places with 28 children

== Famous people ==
=== Sons and daughters of the town ===
- Leo Weismantel (1888–1964), writer
