= Jossa (Sinntal) =

Villagein Hesse, Germany

Coordinates: 50°14′17″N 9°35′34″E

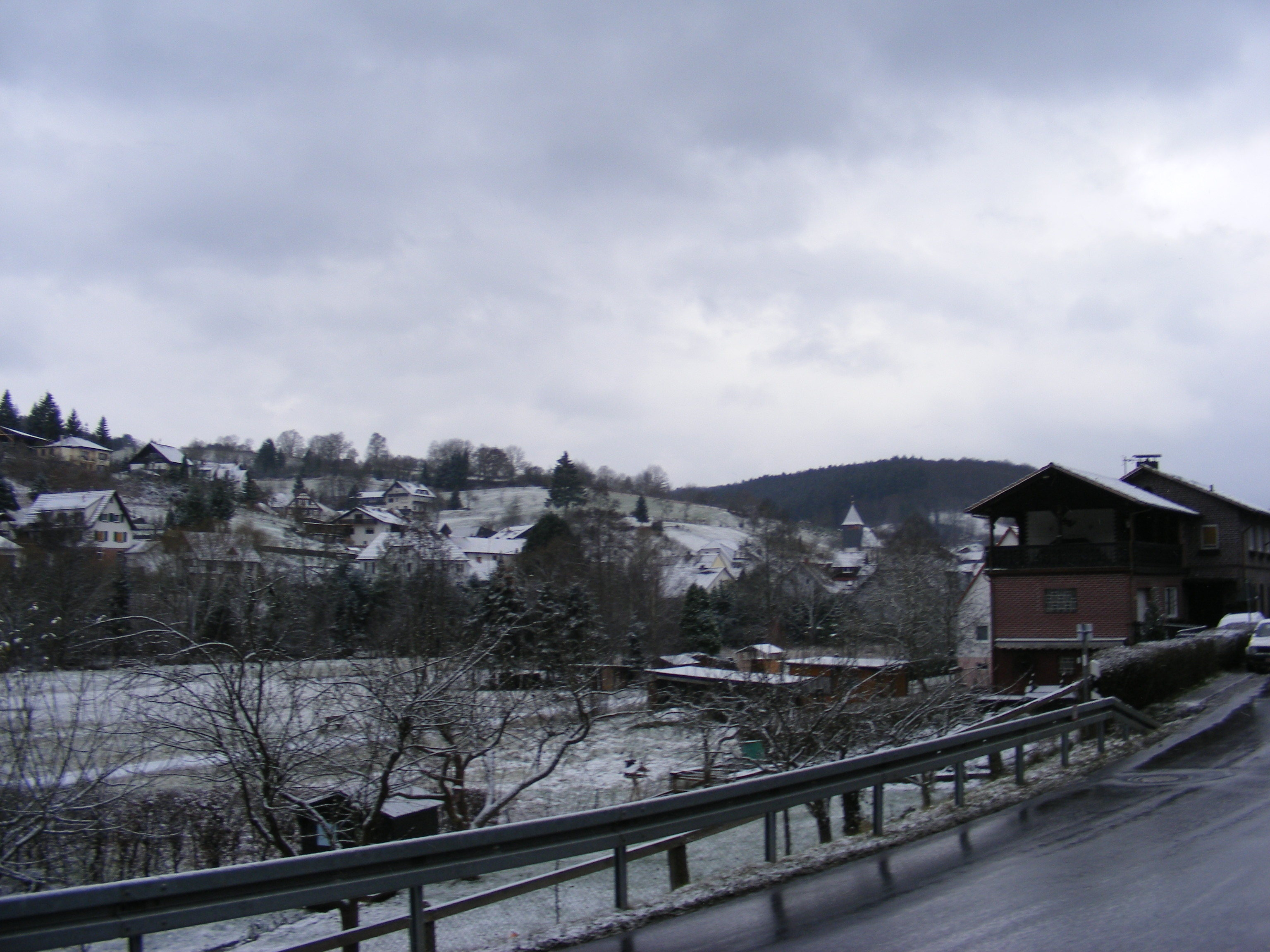
Partial view of Jossa.

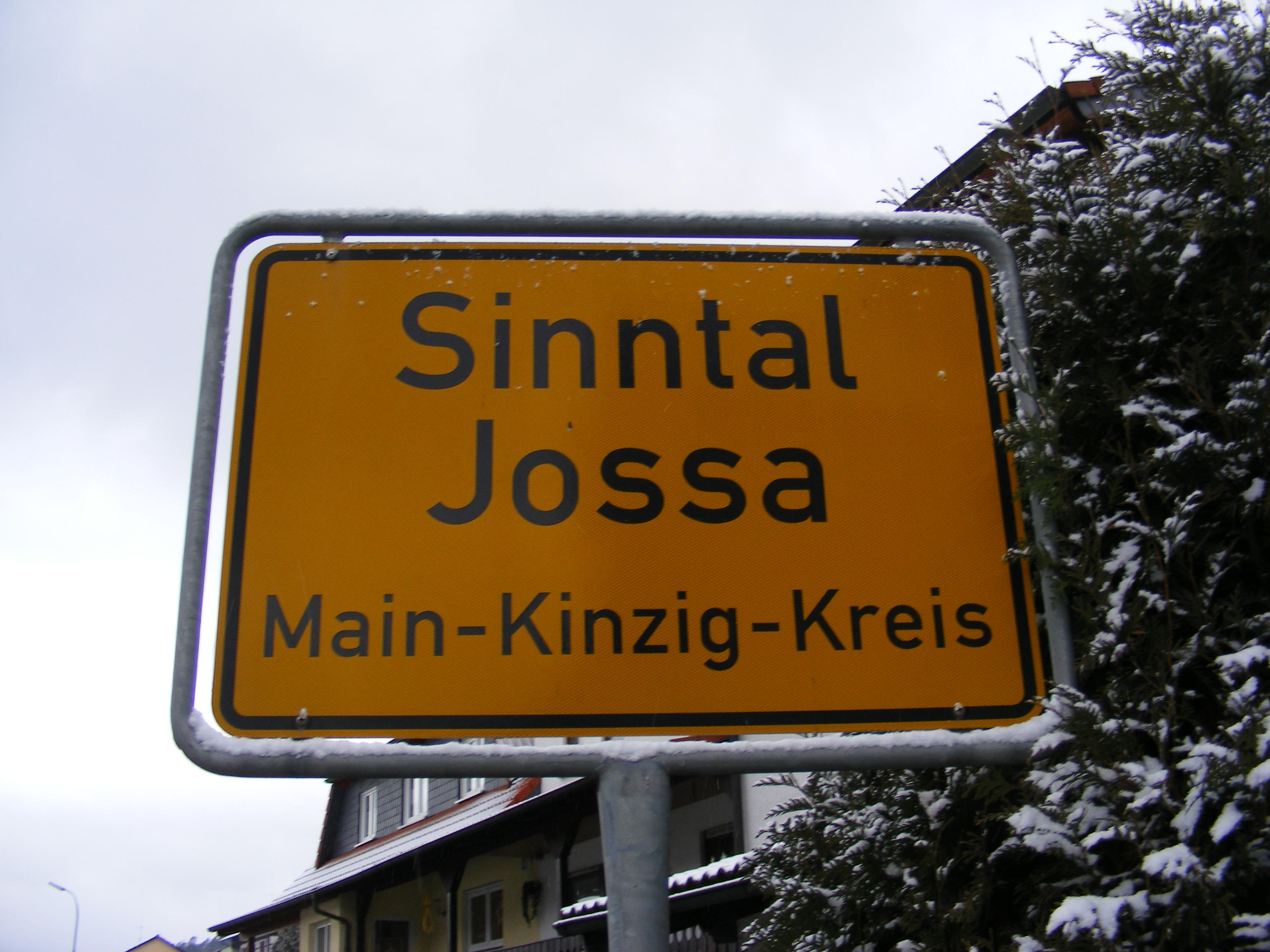
Sign.

Jossa is a village in the German municipality of Sinntal in Main-Kinzig-Kreis in the state of Hesse. Jossa lies within the Spessart nature park and is a state-recognised health resort. The village has 664 inhabitants (as at: 31 December 2005) and covers an area of 181 hectares (450 acres). Its councillor is Günter Walther (2008).
