= Motten =

- Municipality
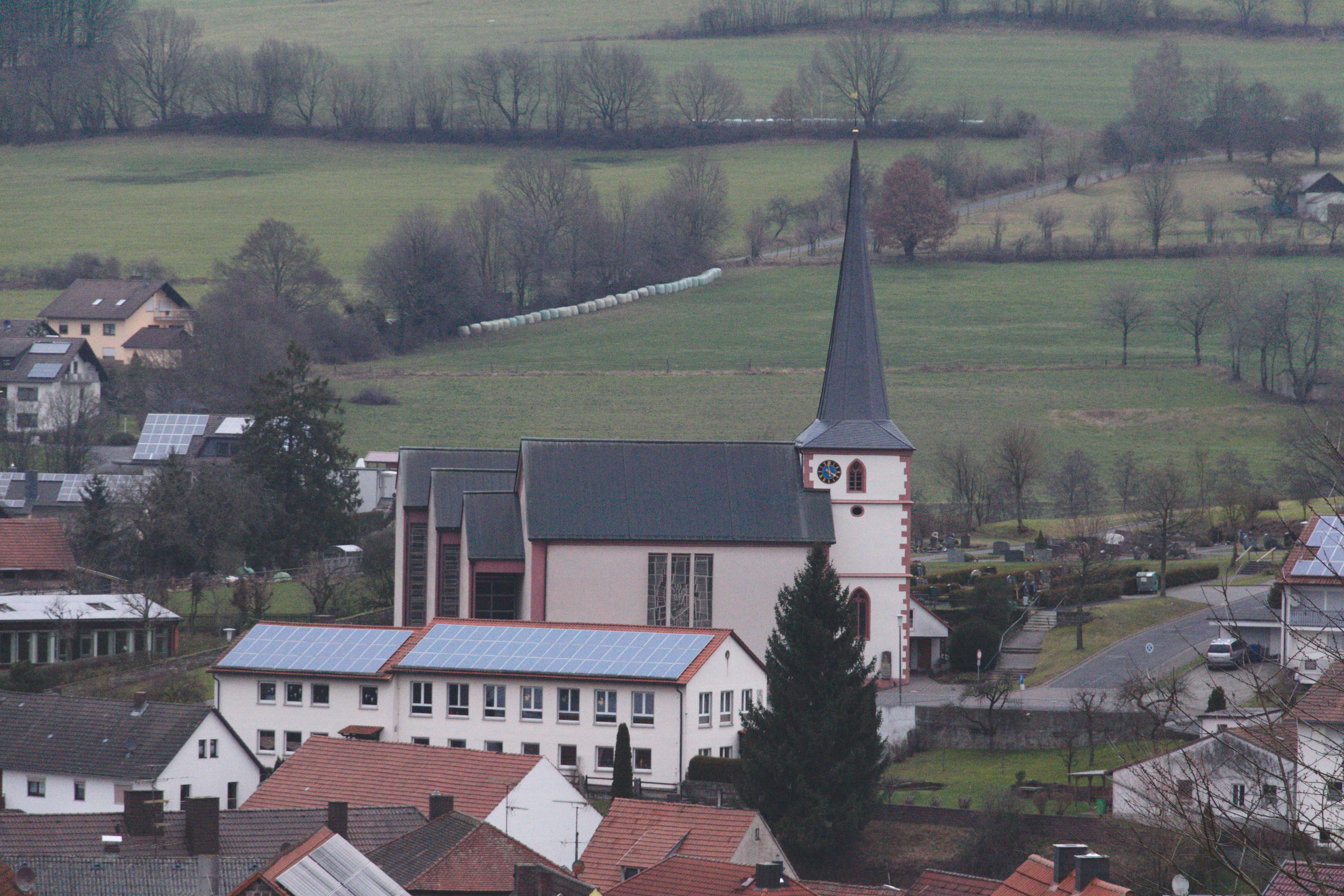
- Church of Saint Bartholomew

- Coat of arms

- Location of Motten within Bad Kissingen district
- Interactive map of Motten
- Location within Germany Location within Bavaria
- Coordinates: 50°24′N 9°46′E
- Country: Germany
- State: Bavaria
- Admin. region: Unterfranken
- District: Bad Kissingen
- Subdivisions: 3 Ortsteile

Government
  - Mayor (2020–26): Katja Habersack

Area
  - Total: 23.8 km^{2} (9.2 sq mi)
- Elevation: 420 m (1,380 ft)

Population (2025-12-31)
  - Total: 1,729
  - Density: 72.6/km^{2} (188/sq mi)
- Time zone: UTC+01:00 (CET)
  - Summer (DST): UTC+02:00 (CEST)
- Postal codes: 97786
- Dialling codes: 09748
- Vehicle registration: KG
- Website: www.motten.de

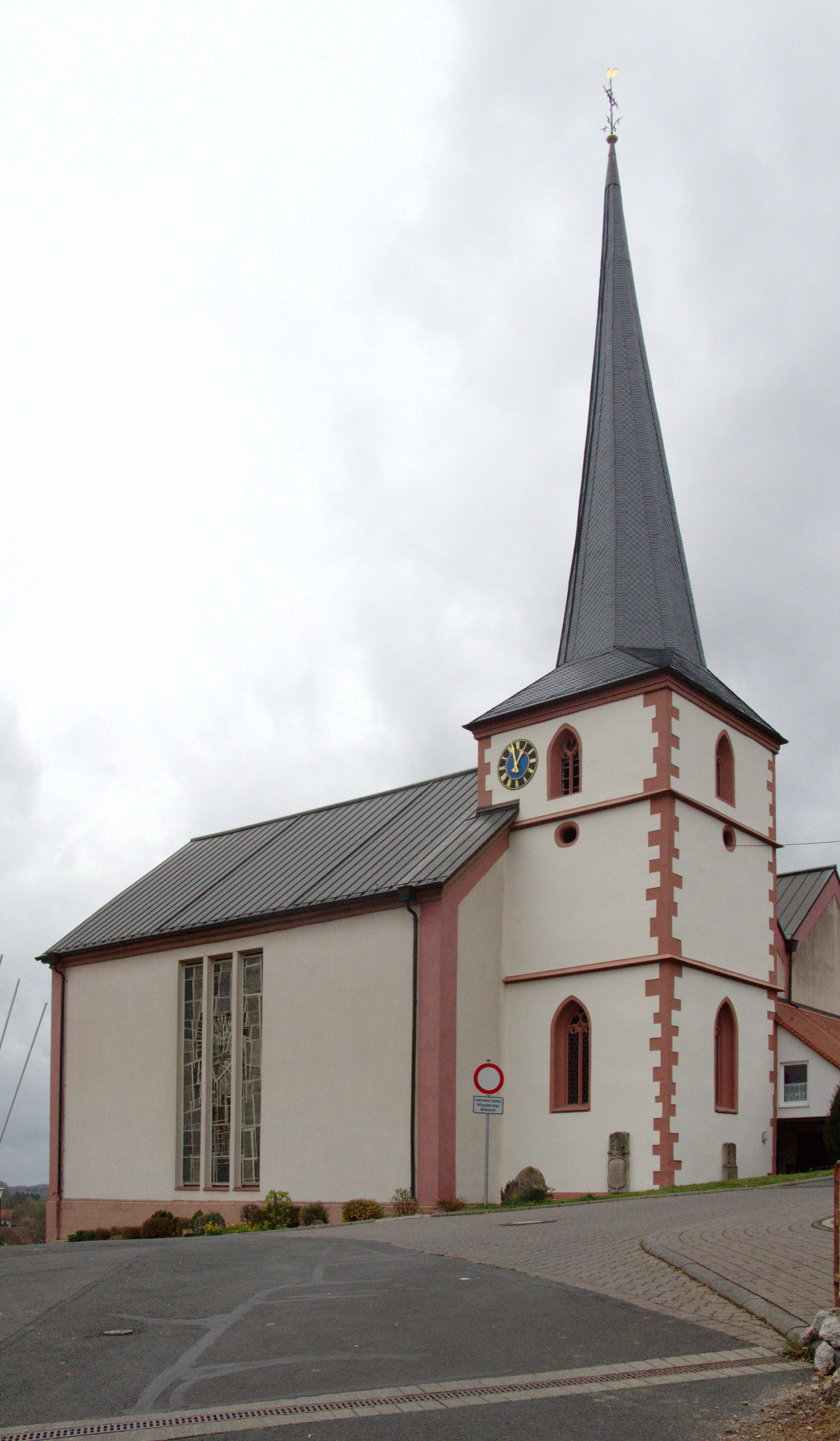
St.-Bartholomäus

Motten (German pronunciation: [ˈmɔtn̩]) is a municipality in the district of Bad Kissingen in Bavaria in Germany.

== Geography ==
=== Subdivisions ===
The municipality consists of the following Ortsteile:

- Kothen
- Motten
- Speicherz

== History ==
Motten originally belonged to the Bishop of Fulda, and was secularized in 1803 and given to Archduke Ferdinand of Orange. In 1806, it became part of the province of Fulde in France. In the Congress of Vienna in 1815, it was given to Austria. Since the Treaty of Munich of 1816, it has belonged to Bavaria.

On the evening of 22 October 2005, a tornado destroyed parts of the industrial district.

== Demographics ==
| Year | Population |
| 1961 | 1491 |
| 1970 | 1617 |
| 1987 | 1641 |
| 1991 | 1741 |
| 1995 | 1961 |
| 2000 | 1946 |
| 2002 | 1946 |
| 2005 | 1935 |
| 2010 | 1794 |
| 2015 | 1771 |

== Economy ==
Motten has had a brewery since the 16th century.

In 1998, there were 242 businesses in the municipality. In 1999, there were 54 agricultural businesses, with 837 ha under cultivation, 227 ha in fields, and 606 ha in pasture.

== Governance ==
=== Coat of arms ===
A black Templar's cross on a diagonal silver band, with a crown above and a gold thistle blossom below on a black background.
