= Sinn (river) =

River in Germany

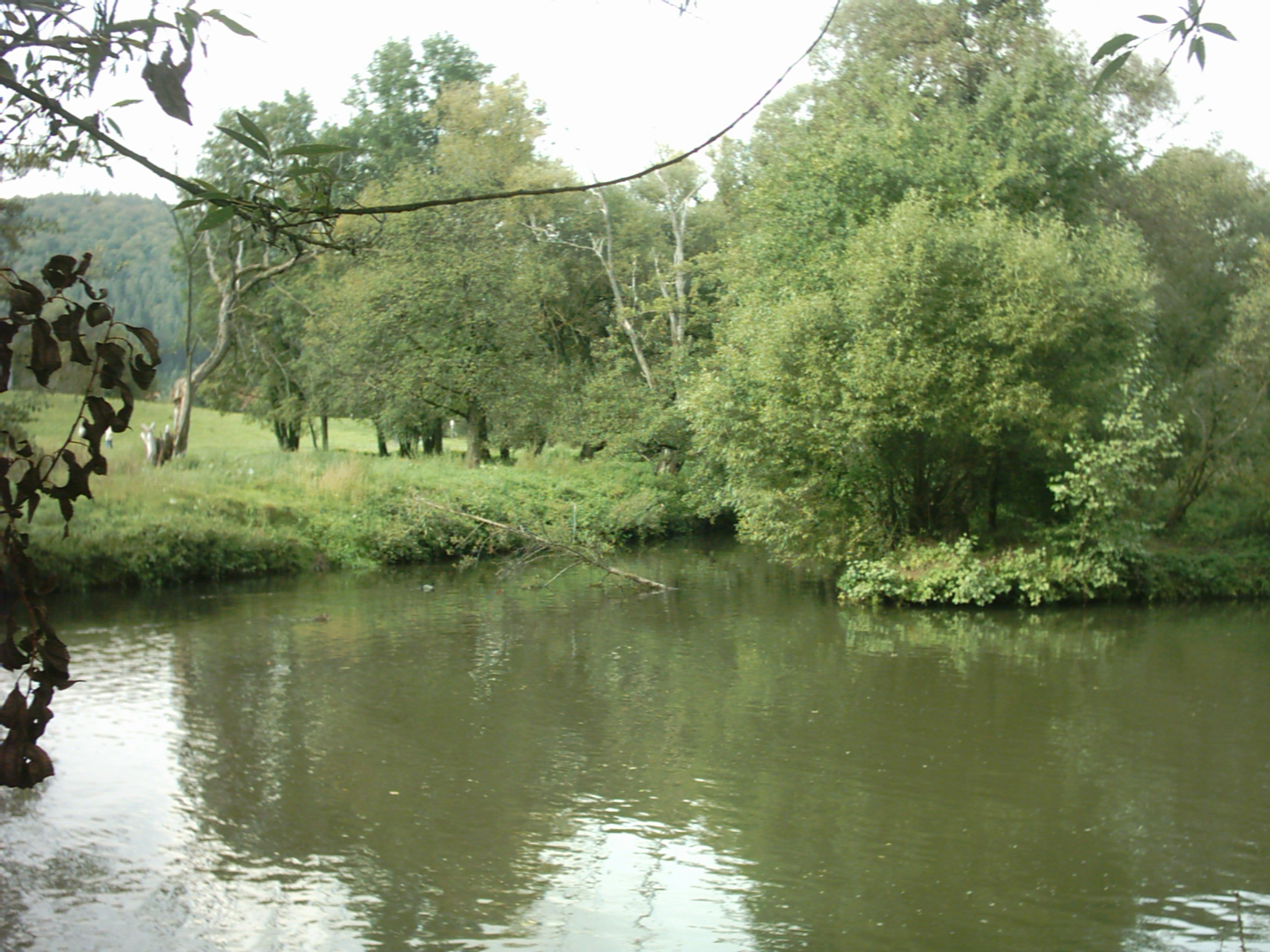
- The Sinn where it enters the Franconian Saale

Location
- Country: Germany
- States: Hesse and Bavaria
- Reference no.: DE: 2448

Physical characteristics
- Source
  - location: near Oberwildflecken, a borogh of Wildflecken
  - coordinates: 50°23′07″N 9°58′14″E
  - elevation: c. 671 m above sea level (NN)
- Mouth
  - location: near Gemünden into the Franconian Saale
  - coordinates: 50°03′39″N 9°41′28″E
  - elevation: c. 154 m above sea level (NN)
- Length: 69.4 km (43.1 mi)
- Basin size: 623.78 km^{2}
- Discharge
  - average: 5,869 L/s
  - minimum: Average low: 1,174 L/s

Basin features
- Progression: Franconian Saale→ Main→ Rhine→ North Sea
- Tributaries
  - left: Oberbach, Mittelbach, Trockenbach, Mitzbach, Röthbach, Kretzengraben
  - right: Ziegelhüttengraben, Disbach, Höllgraben, Leinbach, Krechenbach, Schmale Sinn, Gronaubach, Jossa, Aura, Fliesenbach

The Sinn (German pronunciation: [zɪn]) is a river that flows through the state of Hesse and the Bavarian province of Lower Franconia in southern Germany. It is about 69 kilometres (43 mi) long and is a right, northerly tributary of the Franconian Saale.

== Course ==
The Sinn emerges in the Franconian Rhön at the foot of the Kreuzberg near the local subdistrict (Gemarkung) of Neuwildflecken. At Zeitlofs on the Hessian-Lower Franconian border it flows into the Schmale Sinn which joins it from the Dammersfeldkuppe to the northeast.

Accompanied in places by the Würzburg−Fulda railway and crossed by the A 7 motorway bridge below Riedenberg, the Sinn initially flows in a southwesterly and then in a southerly direction to Gemünden, where it joins the Franconian Saale just under 700 m before the latter river discharges into the River Main.

== Tributaries ==
The tributaries of the Sinn include (in downstream order): Oberbach, Schmale Sinn, Gronau, Jossa and Aura.

== Towns and villages ==
The towns and villages along the Sinn and Schmale Sinn include (in downstream order):

=== Sinn ===
Wildflecken, Oberbach, Riedenberg, Bad Brückenau, Eckarts, Rupboden, Zeitlofs, Altengronau (parish of Sinntal), Jossa, Obersinn, Mittelsinn, Burgsinn, Rieneck, Schaippach, Gemünden.

=== Schmale Sinn ===
Kothen (parish of Motten), Speicherz (parish of Motten), the A 7 Grenzwald Bridge, Oberzell (parish of Sinntal), Weichersbach (parish of Sinntal), Mottgers

== Nature ==
The existence of the extremely rare snake's head fritillary in the Sinn Valley has been recorded since the 19th century. This plant occurs at heights between 160 and 250 metres in various meadow communities, especially in the wet meadows of the two nature reserves that border one another: the Sinngrund near Obersinn and Sinnwiesen von Altengronau.
