= Bad Brückenau =

- Town
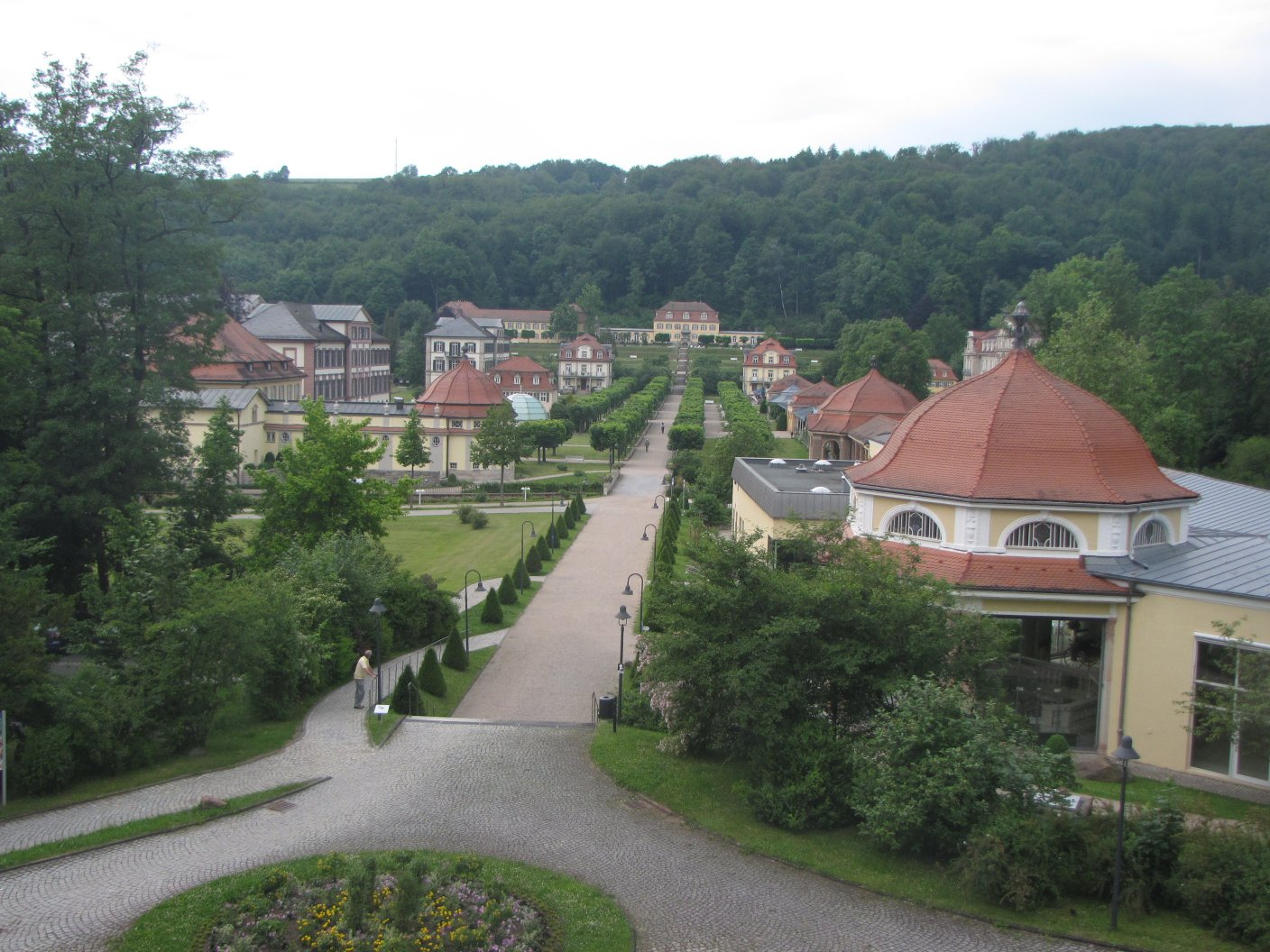
- Staatsbad Brückenau

- Coat of arms

- Location of Bad Brückenau within Bad Kissingen district
- Interactive map of Bad Brückenau
- Location within Germany Location within Bavaria
- Coordinates: 50°18′34″N 9°47′26″E
- Country: Germany
- State: Bavaria
- Admin. region: Unterfranken
- District: Bad Kissingen
- Subdivisions: 5 parts of the city

Government
  - Mayor (2024–30): Jan-Malte Marberg (SPD)

Area
  - Total: 23.71 km^{2} (9.15 sq mi)
- Elevation: 332 m (1,089 ft)

Population (2025-12-31)
  - Total: 6,415
  - Density: 270.6/km^{2} (700.7/sq mi)
- Time zone: UTC+01:00 (CET)
  - Summer (DST): UTC+02:00 (CEST)
- Postal codes: 97769
- Dialling codes: 09741
- Vehicle registration: KG, BRK, HAB
- Website: www.bad-brueckenau.de

Bad Brückenau (German: [baːt ˈbʁʏkənaʊ]) is a spa town in Bad Kissingen district in northwestern Bavaria in the Rhön Mountains.

== Geography ==
Bad Brückenau is in the tree-lined Sinn valley, in the western Rhön Mountains – this river being a tributary of the Main. It consists of five subdivisions: the central town and four suburbs: Staatsbad Brückenau, Wernarz, Volkers and Römershag.

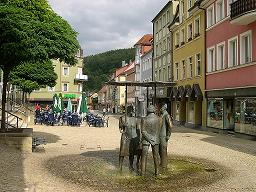
The marketplace of Bad Brückenau

== History ==
=== History of Brückenau ===
The early history of the town is sparsely documented. The first buildings were probably erected close to a ford across the Sinn, which was in use by the time of Charlemagne. By the 12th century the settlement had reached the size of a small town and was called Sinn-Au. Earliest mention of the town is made in a document dating back to 1249, when Fulda Abbey granted Sinn-Au certain privileges. In 1260 the Bishop had four castles built around the town, which he granted to various vassals in the area. Around that time, he also fortified the town with a simple town wall.

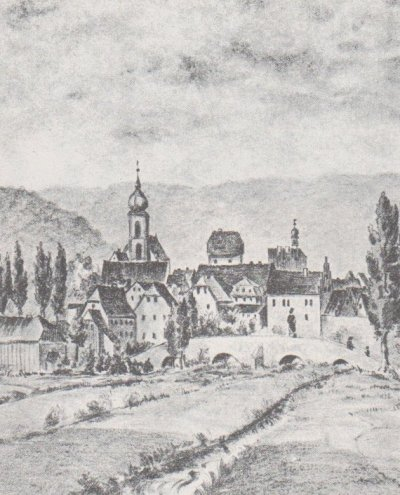
Brückenau with its old bridge. Drawing by H. Girl, before 1876

In 1310 Sinn-Au was granted the rights of a city by King (later Emperor) Heinrich VII. With that, Brückenau gained the rights to maintain its walls, hold markets, have its own council, cut tree in the forests, raise taxes on wine and so on. In 1337, the council made use of its new rights and enlarged the walls and fortified the gates. In 1597 the town received its present name Brückenau, when a bridge (German: Brücke) was built over the Sinn. In August 1876, the town was almost completely destroyed by fire.

=== History of the spa ===
In the 15th century mention is made of a sour-tasting well four kilometers down the valley in south westerly direction. Even then, the water was known for its curative properties, and in 1747 Bishop Amandus von Buseck of Fulda built a fountain. Under his successor Heinrich von Bibra, the first hotels were built and two more wells discovered. The Baroque ensemble along the main axis of the Kurpark dates back to these days.

In 1816, following the Napoleonic Wars, Brückenau became part of the Kingdom of Bavaria. Brückenau became the favorite spa of King Ludwig I of Bavaria, who financed an encompassing renovation. The central building dating back to this era is the Große Kursaal. After the German Revolution of 1848 and the abdication of Ludwig I, the Bavarian government leased the spa to private entrepreneurs. Today, most of the hotels are leased by Dorint.

In the first decade of the 20th century, the town, rebuilt after the fire, began to imitate the success of the spa. Three wells were discovered, the town and a group of citizens created two parks. In the administrative reform of 1970, the Staatsbad became part of the town and all of Brückenau was granted the official title "Bad".

== Culture and Sights ==
=== Museums ===
- Heimatmuseum: in the town centre, this gives an impression of daily life in Brückenau in the 18th and 19th centuries.
- German Bicycle-Museum

=== Music ===
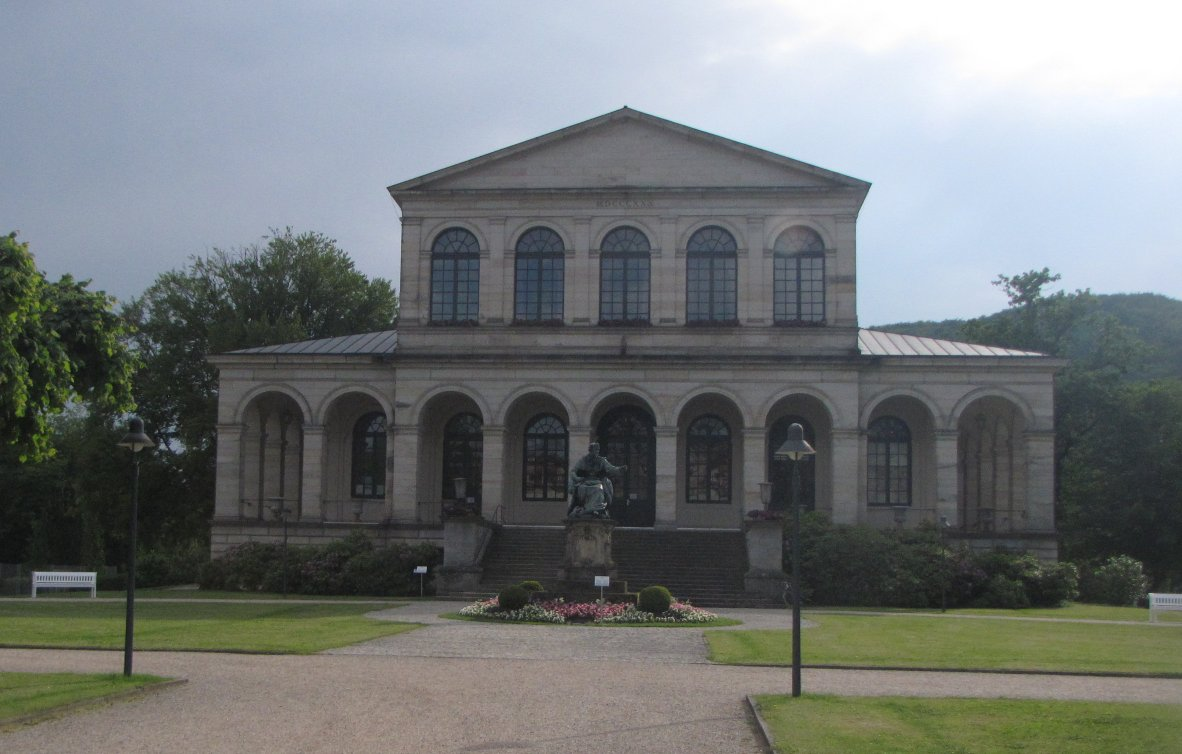
Großer Kursaal, 2010

- Bayerisches Kammerorchester
- Kurorchester

=== Architecture ===
- Großer Kursaal: the Großer Kursaal was planned in 1827 by the Munich architect Johann Gottfried Gutensohn and built by the Brückenau master builder Lorenz Hergenröder. Its neoclassical style influenced the historicist architecture of spas all over southern Germany.
- Altstadt: the old town hosts buildings including historic pubs and inns dating back to the 16th century.
- Kloster Volkersberg: the former Franciscan monastery dating back to the 17th century is in Volkers and looks towards some of the Rhön Mountains.

== Mayors ==
- 1998-2010: Thomas Ullmann
- 2010-2020: Brigitte Meyerdierks (CSU)
- since 2020: Jochen Vogel

== Town twinning ==
Bad Brückenau is twinned with:

- (United Kingdom) - Kirkham, Lancashire (since 1995)
- (France) - Ancenis, Loire-Atlantique (since 1980)

== Notable people ==
- de:Ernst Putz (1896-1933), member of parliament of the communist party, in 1933 murdered by the Nazis
- de:David Schuster (1910-1999), businessman, member of the Bavarian Senate and chairman of the Jewish Community of Würzburg and Lower Franconia
- Johann Altfuldisch, also Hans Altfuldisch (1911-1947, executed), Obersturmführer and temporarily deputy head of a central part of the Mauthausen concentration camp
- Gerda Müller (born 1944), jurist, vice-president of the Federal Court of Justice 2005-2009
