= Fellen =

- Municipality
- Coat of arms

- Location of Fellen within Main-Spessart district
- Interactive map of Fellen
- Location within Germany Location within Bavaria
- Coordinates: 50°9′N 9°35′E
- Country: Germany
- State: Bavaria
- Admin. region: Unterfranken
- District: Main-Spessart
- Municipal assoc.: Burgsinn

Government
  - Mayor (2020–26): Zita Baur

Area
  - Total: 34.33 km^{2} (13.25 sq mi)
- Elevation: 236 m (774 ft)

Population (2025-12-31)
  - Total: 838
  - Density: 24.4/km^{2} (63.2/sq mi)
- Time zone: UTC+01:00 (CET)
  - Summer (DST): UTC+02:00 (CEST)
- Postal codes: 97778
- Dialling codes: 09356
- Vehicle registration: MSP
- Website: www.fellen.de

Fellen is a municipality in the Main-Spessart district in the Regierungsbezirk of Lower Franconia (Unterfranken) in Bavaria, Germany and a member of the Verwaltungsgemeinschaft (Administrative Community) of Burgsinn.

== Geography ==
=== Location ===
Fellen lies in the Mittelgebirge Spessart, in the Würzburg Region.

=== Subdivisions ===
The community has the following Gemarkungen (traditional rural cadastral areas): Fellen, Rengersbrunn, Wohnrod and Neuhof.

== History ==
Fellen was part of the County of Rieneck. In 1806, it was mediatized within the Principality of Aschaffenburg, with which it passed in 1814, with the odd small exception, to Bavaria. In the course of administrative reform in Bavaria, the current community came into being with the Gemeindeedikt (“Municipal Edict”) of 1818.

== Economy ==
Municipal taxes in 1999 amounted to €367,000 (converted), of which net business taxes amounted to €44,000.

According to official statistics, there were 81 workers on the social welfare contribution rolls working in producing businesses in 1998, and in trade and transport 17. In other areas, 329 such workers worked from home. Nobody was employed in processing businesses. One business was in construction, and furthermore, in 1999, there were 29 agricultural operations with a working area of 328 ha, of which 44 ha was cropland and 200 ha was meadowland.

== Governance ==
The mayor is Zita Baur.

=== Coat of arms ===
The community's arms might be described thus: Barry of six gules and Or, in base a mount of three vert on each side of the middle mount two oakleaves each acorned of one towards the nombril point, between the leaves in chief a crown argent.

== Education ==
In 1999 the following institutions existed in Fellen:

- Kindergartens: 50 places with 38 children
