= Zeitlofs =

- Municipality
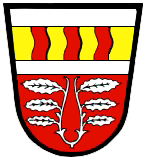
- Coat of arms

- Location of Zeitlofs within Bad Kissingen district
- Interactive map of Zeitlofs
- Location within Germany Location within Bavaria
- Coordinates: 50°16′N 09°40′E
- Country: Germany
- State: Bavaria
- Admin. region: Unterfranken
- District: Bad Kissingen
- Subdivisions: 4Ortsteile

Government
  - Mayor (2020–26): Matthias Hauke

Area
  - Total: 40.11 km^{2} (15.49 sq mi)
- Elevation: 242 m (794 ft)

Population (2025-12-31)
  - Total: 1,968
  - Density: 49.07/km^{2} (127.1/sq mi)
- Time zone: UTC+01:00 (CET)
  - Summer (DST): UTC+02:00 (CEST)
- Postal codes: 97799
- Dialling codes: 09746
- Vehicle registration: KG
- Website: www.markt-zeitlofs.de

Zeitlofs is a municipality in the district of Bad Kissingen in Bavaria in Germany.
